= Adana Yeşiloba Hippodrome =

Horse racing track in Adana, Turkey

Coordinates: 36.992424°N 35.229635°E

Adana Yeşiloba Hippodrome Adana Yeşiloba Hipodromu
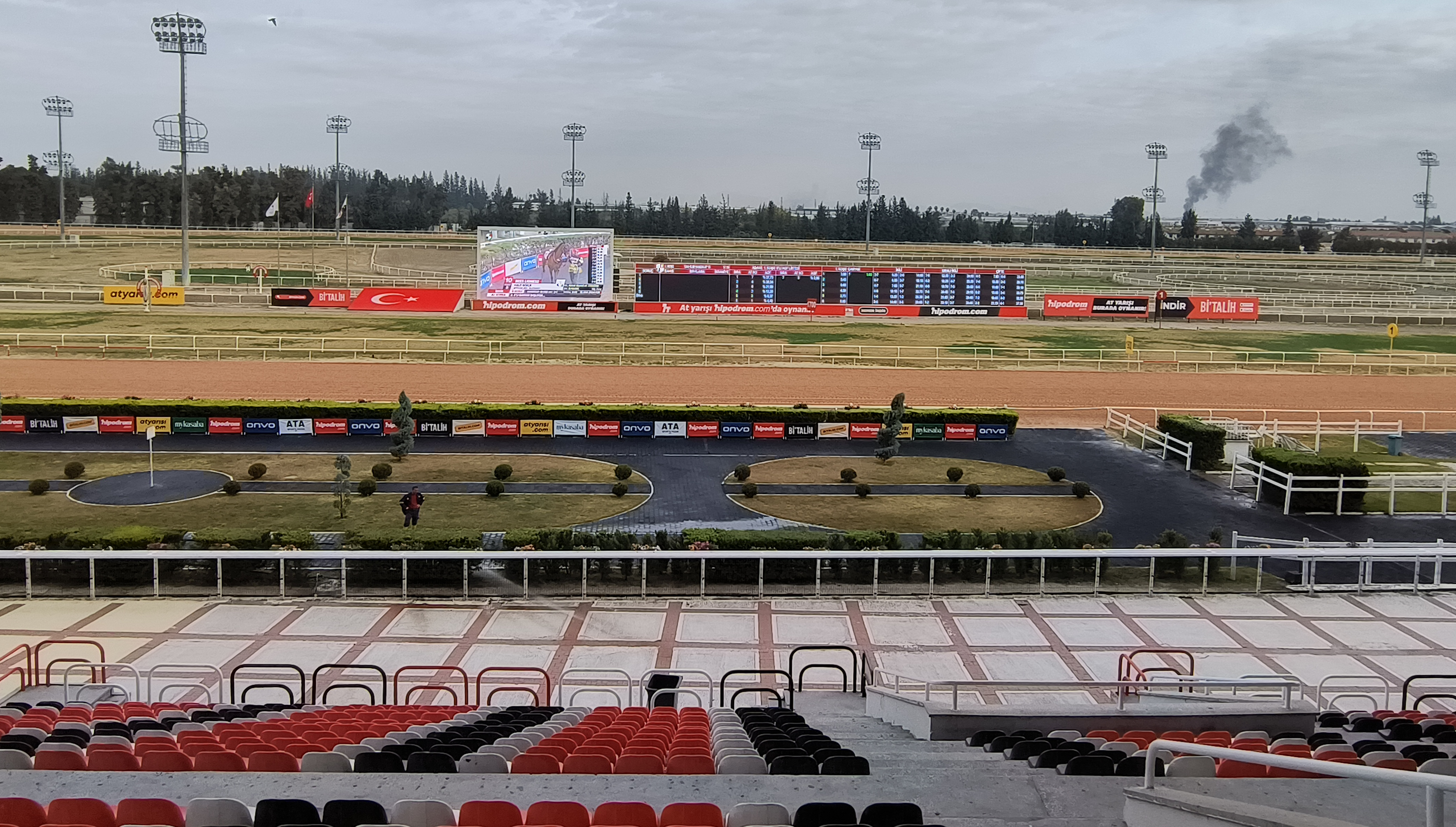
- The Finish
- Interactive map of Adana Yeşiloba Hippodrome; Adana Yeşiloba Hipodromu
- Location: Yeşiloba, Seyhan, Adana, Turkey
- Owned by: Jockey Club of Turkey (TJK)
- Date opened: 1962; 64 years ago
- Screened on: TJK TV
- Course type: Flat/Thoroughbred

Adana Yeşiloba Hippodrome (Turkish: Adana Yeşiloba Hipodromu) is a horse racing track located at the Yeşiloba neighborhood of the Seyhan district of the city Adana. Owned and operated by the Jockey Club of Turkey (TJK), the racecourse has been in operation at its current 66.6-hectare (165-acre) site since 1962.

== History ==
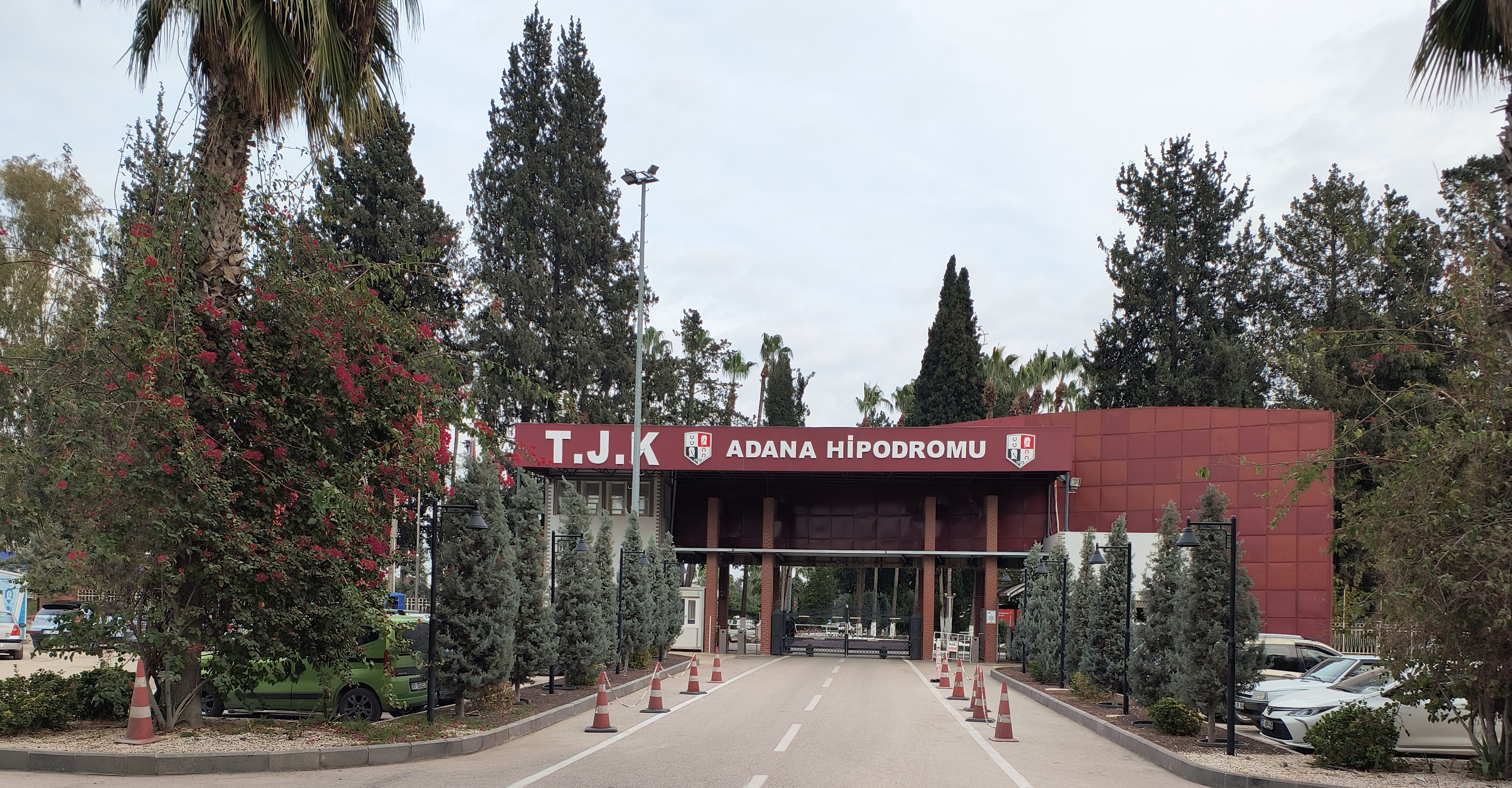
Entrance

Horse racing started in Adana in 1962 at a race course near the Şakirpaşa Airport. Shortly afterwards, the race course moved to its current location to a 66.6-hectare (165-acre) land area. At the opening, there was only the sand track which still serves today. The turf track was completed in 1996 and started hosting competitions in the spring of 1998. Besides the two tracks, training track was opened in fall 2000. There are currently 3 tracks at the race course.

The second spectator stands, which has a 3000-seat capacity, was opened in January 1999.

== Physical attributes ==
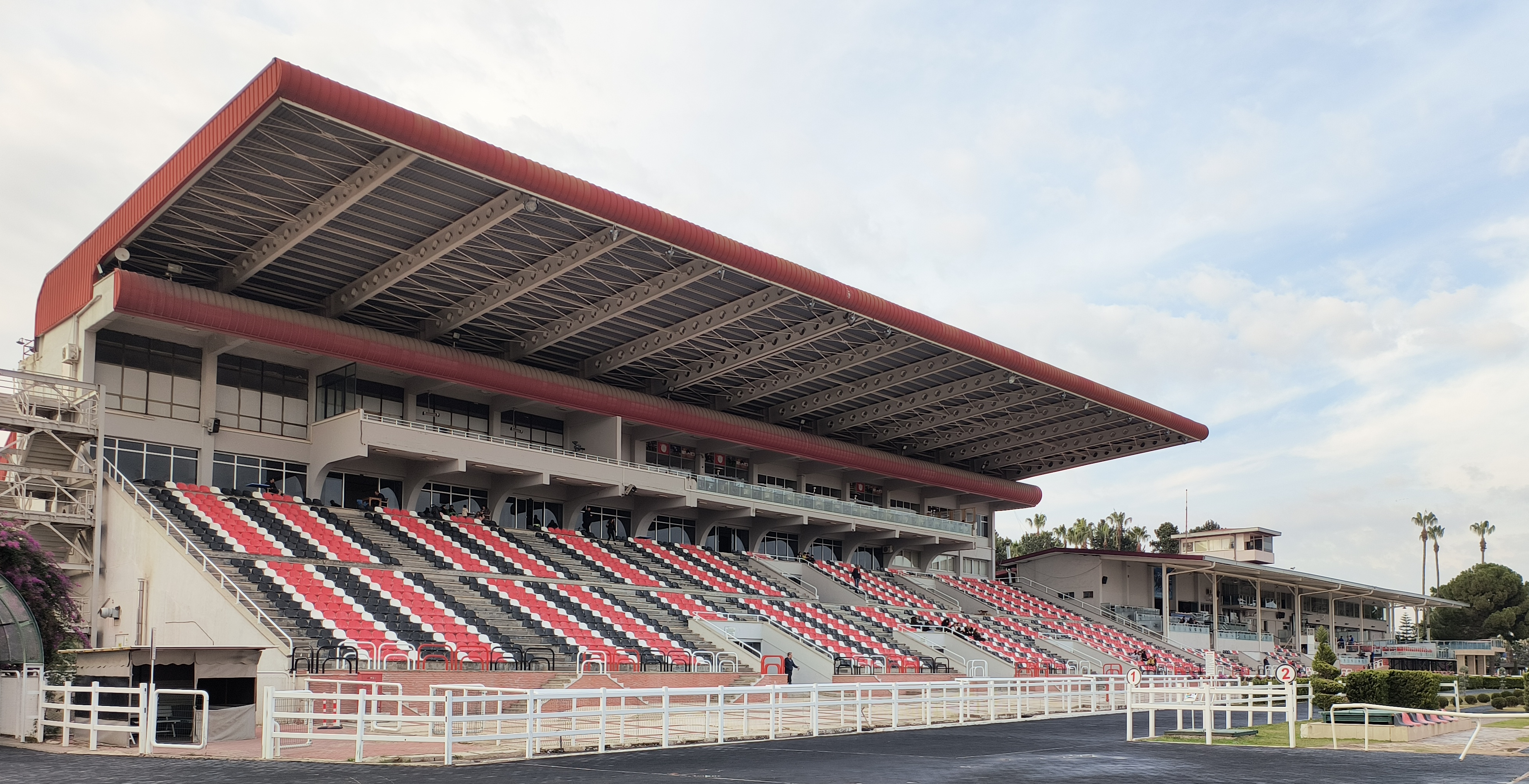
Stands

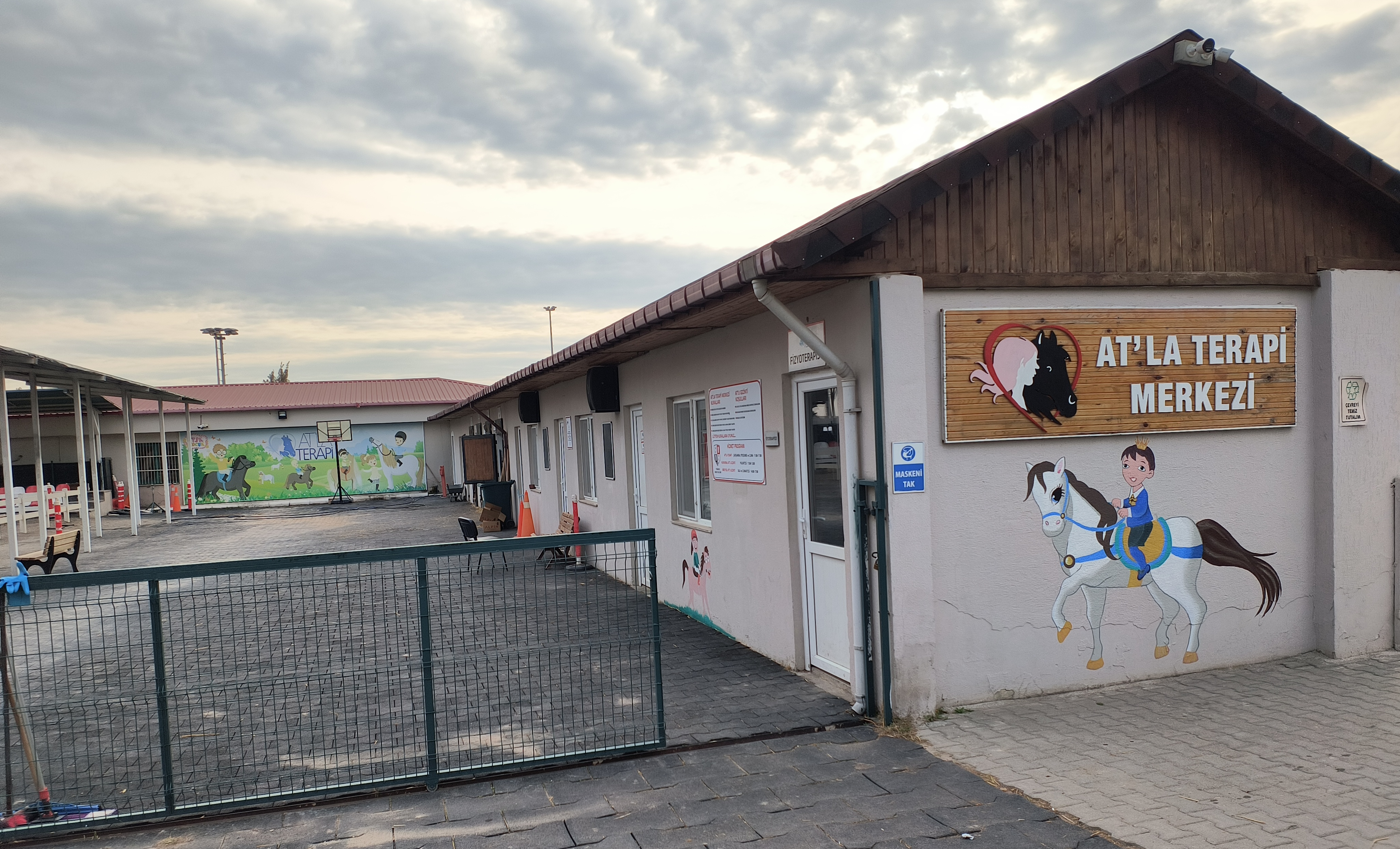
Therapy with horses

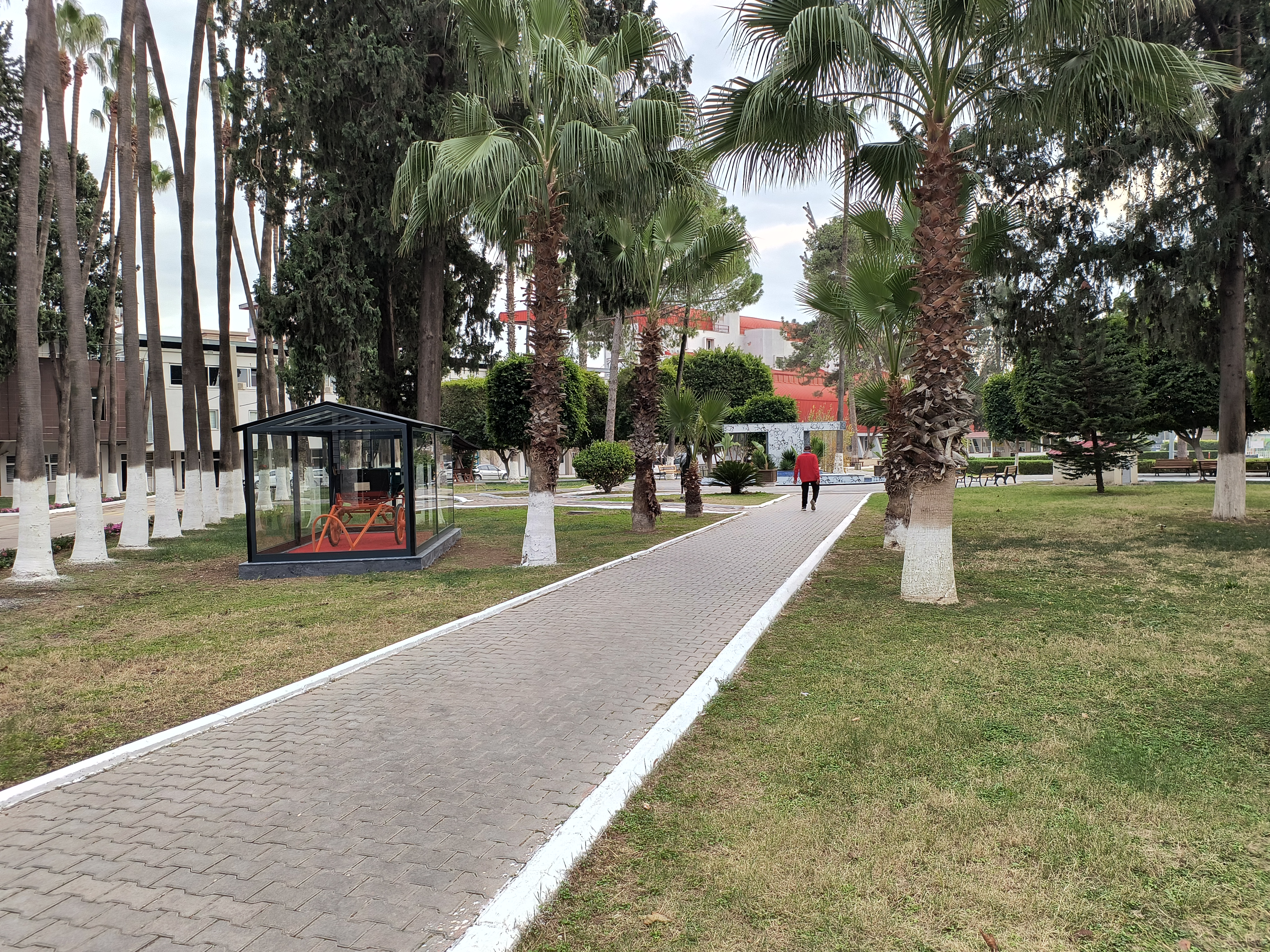
The garden

The race course covers an area of 66.6 ha (165 acres) consisting of facilities for racing, training and barns. The race course has three interleaved tracks as:

- a 1,800 m (2,000 yd) long and 25 m (82 ft) wide sand oval,
- a 1,600 m (1,700 yd) long and 20 m (66 ft) wide turf oval for all-weather racing and
- a 1,400 m (1,500 yd) long and 15 m (49 ft) wide sand oval for training.

There are two spectator stands, newer one being a 3-storey, 3000-seat modern structure. Within the complex there are also five restaurants, food vendors, a playground for children and a haflinger paddock. An area of more than 1 hectare is set as a recreational area for visitors.

There are five pony barns at the race course, also an oat storage and a horseshoer. At the pension area, there are 1260 barns and a modern horse hospital that accommodates a surgery unit. Also at this area there is a shopping and services area.

== Transportation ==
Yeşiloba Hippodrome can be accessed by Barkal minibuses from downtown of Adana, and by TOK and Koç minibuses from Tarsus and Mersin.

Şehitlik railway station, 1.6 km east of the hippodrome, is served by frequent trains from Adana Central, Şakirpaşa, Yenice, Tarsus and Mersin Central stations.
