= Taşkent railway station =

Railway station in Mersin, Turkey

TAŞKENT

General information
- Location: Cumhuriyet Blv., Dikilitaş Mah. 33115; Akdeniz, Mersin; Turkey
- Coordinates: 36.8639°N 34.7717°E
- System: TCDD Taşımacılık regional rail station
- Owner: Turkish State Railways
- Operator: TCDD Taşımacılık
- Line: Mersin–İslahiye Mersin–İskenderun Mersin–Adana
- Platforms: 1 island platform
- Tracks: 2

Construction
- Parking: Yes

Services
Preceding station	TCDD Taşımacılık	Following station
Karacailyas towards Mersin	Mersin–İslahiye	Huzurkent towards İslahiye
Karacailyas towards Mersin	Mersin–İskenderun	Huzurkent towards İskenderun
Karacailyas towards Mersin	Mersin–Adana	Huzurkent towards Adana
Location

Taşkent railway station (Turkish: Taşkent istasyonu) is a railway station in the Mersin Province of Turkey, on the Adana-Mersin railway. Though legally located within the Dikilitaş neighborhood of Mersin, the station is just east of the city. TCDD Taşımacılık operates daily regional train service from Mersin to Adana, İskenderun and İslahiye, with a total of 24 daily trains stopping at Taşkent, in each direction.

Taşkent station has two side platforms serving two tracks.
