= Huzurkent railway station =

Railway station in Huzurkent, Turkey

HUZURKENT

General information
- Location: Huzurkent, 33100; Akdeniz, Mersin; Turkey
- Coordinates: 36.8844°N 34.8199°E
- System: TCDD Taşımacılık regional rail station
- Owner: Turkish State Railways
- Operator: TCDD Taşımacılık
- Line: Mersin–İslahiye Mersin–İskenderun Mersin–Adana
- Platforms: 1 side platform
- Tracks: 2

Construction
- Parking: No

Services
Preceding station	TCDD Taşımacılık	Following station
Taşkent towards Mersin	Mersin–İslahiye	Tarsus towards İslahiye
Taşkent towards Mersin	Mersin–İskenderun	Tarsus towards İskenderun
Taşkent towards Mersin	Mersin–Adana	Tarsus towards Adana
Location

Huzurkent railway station (Turkish: Huzurkent istasyonu) is a railway station in Huzurkent, Turkey, on the Adana-Mersin railway. The station consists of a side platform on the eastbound track. TCDD Taşımacılık operates daily regional train service from Mersin to Adana, İskenderun and İslahiye, with a total of 14 daily trains stopping at Huzurkent, in each direction.

Huzurkent station has two side platforms serving two tracks.
