= Karacailyas railway station =

Railway station in Mersin, Turkey

KARACAİLYAS

General information
- Location: Kışla Cd., Dikilitaş Mah. 33115; Akdeniz, Mersin; Turkey
- Coordinates: 36.8460°N 34.7086°E
- System: TCDD Taşımacılık regional rail station
- Owner: Turkish State Railways
- Operator: TCDD Taşımacılık
- Line: Mersin–İslahiye Mersin–İskenderun Mersin–Adana
- Platforms: 2 side platforms
- Tracks: 2

Construction
- Parking: Yes
- Accessible: Yes

Services
Preceding station	TCDD Taşımacılık	Following station
Tırmıl towards Mersin	Mersin–İslahiye	Taşkent towards İslahiye
Tırmıl towards Mersin	Mersin–İskenderun	Taşkent towards İskenderun
Tırmıl towards Mersin	Mersin–Adana	Taşkent towards Adana
Location

Karacailyas railway station (Turkish: Karacailyas istasyonu) is a railway station in Mersin, Turkey, on the Adana-Mersin railway. Located within the Akdeniz district in Mersin, the station is the easternmost station within the city. TCDD Taşımacılık operates daily regional train service from Mersin to Adana, İskenderun and İslahiye, with a total of 12 daily trains stopping at Karacailyas, in each direction.

Karacailyas station has two side platforms serving two tracks.
