= Tırmıl railway station =

Railway station in Mersin, Turkey

TIRMIL

General information
- Location: Çilek Mah. 33020; Akdeniz, Mersin; Turkey
- Coordinates: 36.8311°N 34.6785°E
- System: TCDD Taşımacılık regional rail station
- Owner: Turkish State Railways
- Operator: TCDD Taşımacılık
- Line: Mersin–İslahiye Mersin–İskenderun Mersin–Adana
- Platforms: 1 side platform
- Tracks: 1

Construction
- Parking: Yes
- Accessible: Yes

History
- Rebuilt: 2011

Services
Preceding station	TCDD Taşımacılık	Following station
Mersin Terminus	Mersin–İslahiye	Karacailyas towards İslahiye
Mersin Terminus	Mersin–İskenderun	Karacailyas towards İskenderun
Mersin Terminus	Mersin–Adana	Karacailyas towards Adana
Location

Tırmıl railway station (Turkish: Tırmıl istasyonu) is a railway station in Mersin, Turkey, on the Adana-Mersin railway between Mersin and Karacailyas railway stations Located within the Akdeniz ilçe (district) in east Mersin, the station is located at the west end of Tırmıl yard. TCDD Taşımacılık operates daily regional train service from Mersin to Adana, İskenderun and İslahiye, with a total of 12 daily trains stopping at Tırmıl, in each direction.
