= Tarsus railway station =

Railway station in Tarsus, Turkey

TARSUS
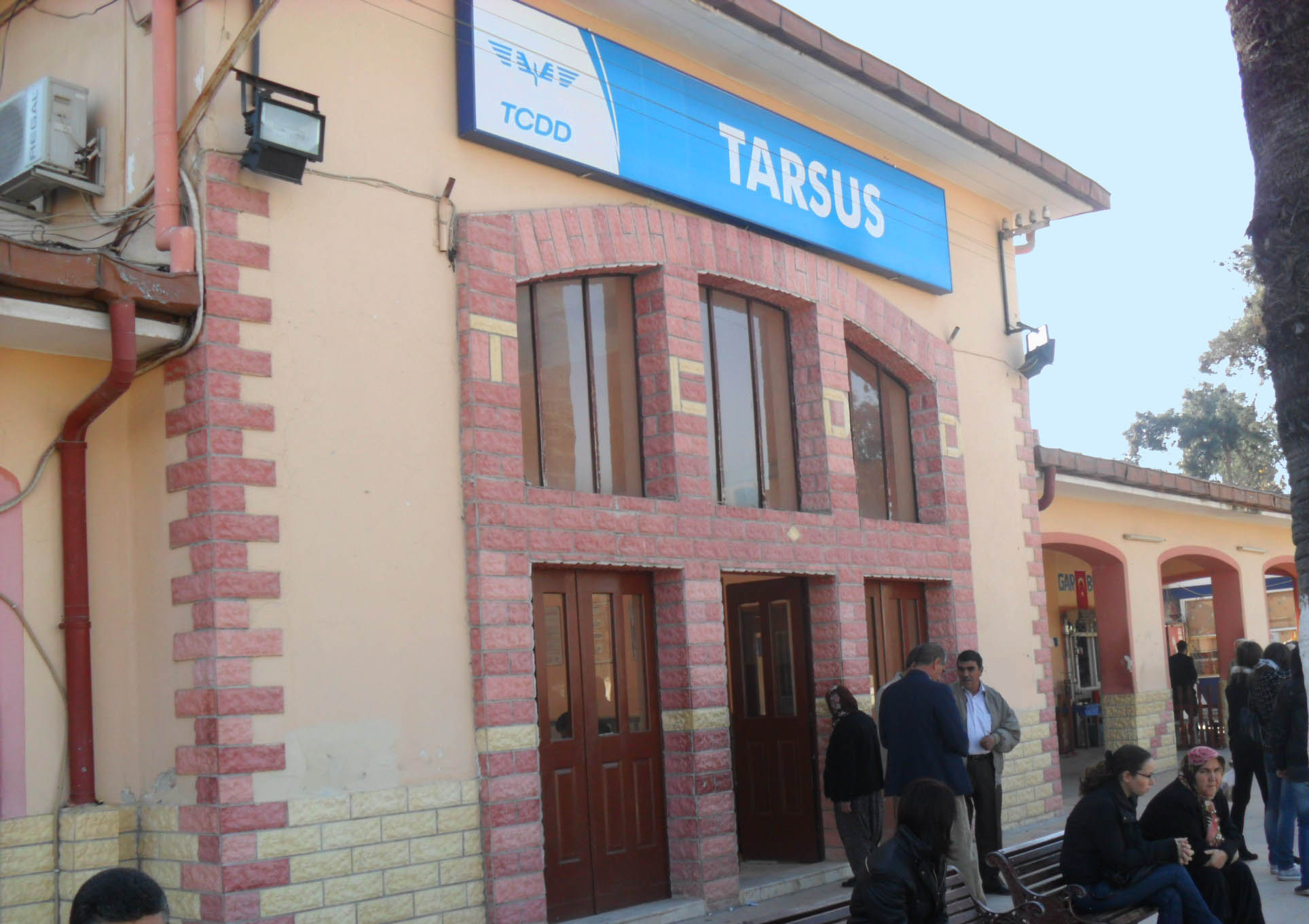
- The station building.

General information
- Location: Karden Langen Blv., Yeşilyurt Mah., Tarsus 33410; Tarsus; Turkey
- Coordinates: 36°55′15″N 34°53′08″E
- System: TCDD regional rail station
- Owner: Turkish State Railways
- Operator: TCDD Taşımacılık
- Lines: TCDD Taşımacılık: Adana-Mersin Regional; Mersin-İsalahiye Regional; Mersin-İskenderun Regional
- Platforms: 2 (1 island platform, 1 side platform
- Tracks: 3

Construction
- Structure type: At-grade
- Parking: Yes

History
- Opened: 2 August 1886
- Rebuilt: 1949

Services
Preceding station	TCDD Taşımacılık	Following station
Huzurkent towards Mersin	Mersin–İslahiye	Yenice towards İslahiye
Huzurkent towards Mersin	Mersin–İskenderun	Yenice towards İskenderun
Huzurkent towards Mersin	Mersin–Adana	Yenice towards Adana
Location
- Location within Turkey

Tarsus station (Turkish: Tarsus İstasyonu) is a railway station in the city of Tarsus. Tarsus is a city in Mersin Province, Turkey (population 350,000 as of 2022).

== The station ==
The station was built in 1886 to be one of the four intermediate stations on the 67 kilometres (42 mi) long Adana–Mersin Railway Line (others being Zeytinli, Yenice and Taşkent). It became a part of the Berlin-Baghdad Railway in 1911. This increased the traffic of the station. After the Republic of Turkey was proclaimed in 1923, Turkish government began the railway nationalization project. According to act no.1376 (Jan. 5, 1929) Adana-Mersin railway was also absorbed by the Chemins de Fer Ottomans d'Anatolie (Turkish: Osmanlı Anadolu Demiryolları), a subsidiary of the Turkish State Railways (TCDD). Presently the number of intermediate stations is 9.

== The station building ==
The original station building no longer exists. The present station building was built in 1949. The building is symmetrical. The tollbooths are in the central section.

== Services ==
The majority of trains using Tarsus station are freight trains. The main passenger service is between Mersin and Adana, 23 times daily, all of which stop at Tarsus. Some of these trains connect with main line trains at Yenice, the next station east of Tarsus.
