= Şehitlik railway station =

Railway station in Seyhan, Adana, Turkey

ŞEHİTLİK
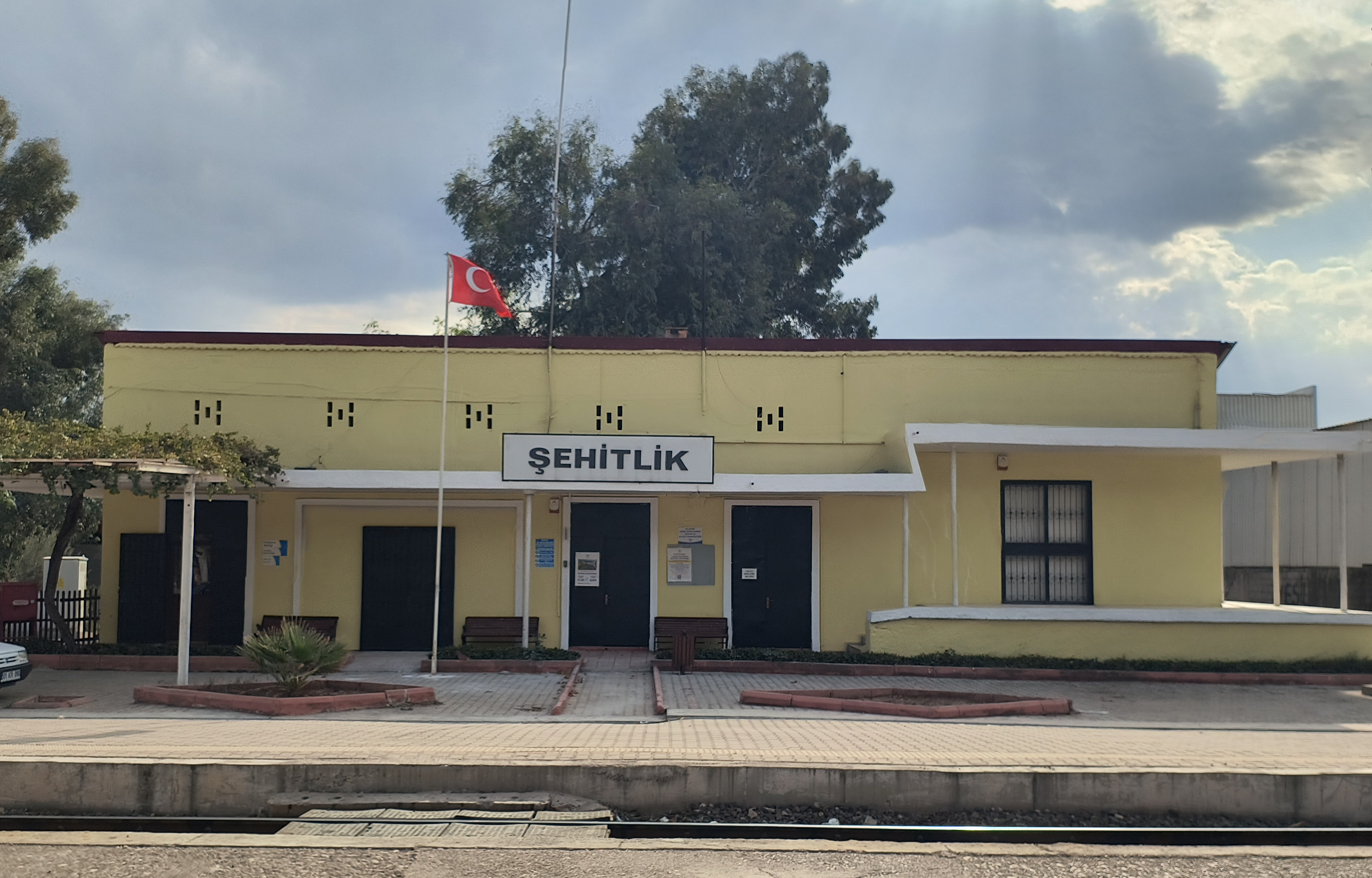
- Station Building

General information
- Location: Yeşiloba, Seyhan; Adana, Turkey
- Coordinates: 36°59′52″N 35°14′37″E
- System: TCDD intercity and regional rail station
- Owner: Turkish State Railways
- Lines: Adana-Mersin Regional; İskenderun-Mersin Regional; İslahiye-Mersin Regional; Erciyes Ekspresi
- Platforms: 2
- Tracks: 2
- Connections: Adana Central Coach Terminal

Construction
- Structure type: At-grade
- Parking: No

Services
| Preceding station | TCDD Taşımacılık | Following station |
|---|---|---|
| Yenice towards Kayseri | Erciyes Express | Şakirpaşa towards Adana |
| Yenice towards Mersin | Mersin–İslahiye | Şakirpaşa towards İslahiye |
| Yenice towards Mersin | Mersin–İskenderun | Şakirpaşa towards İskenderun |
| Yenice towards Mersin | Mersin–Adana | Şakirpaşa towards Adana |
Location

Şehitlik station is a railway station in Adana, located in the Yeşiloba mahalle of the Seyhan district. It is the closest railway station to the Central Coach Terminal at 1.5 km (0.93 mi) distance. Yeşiloba horse-racing venue is 1.6 km (0.99 mi) west of the station.

== Gallery ==
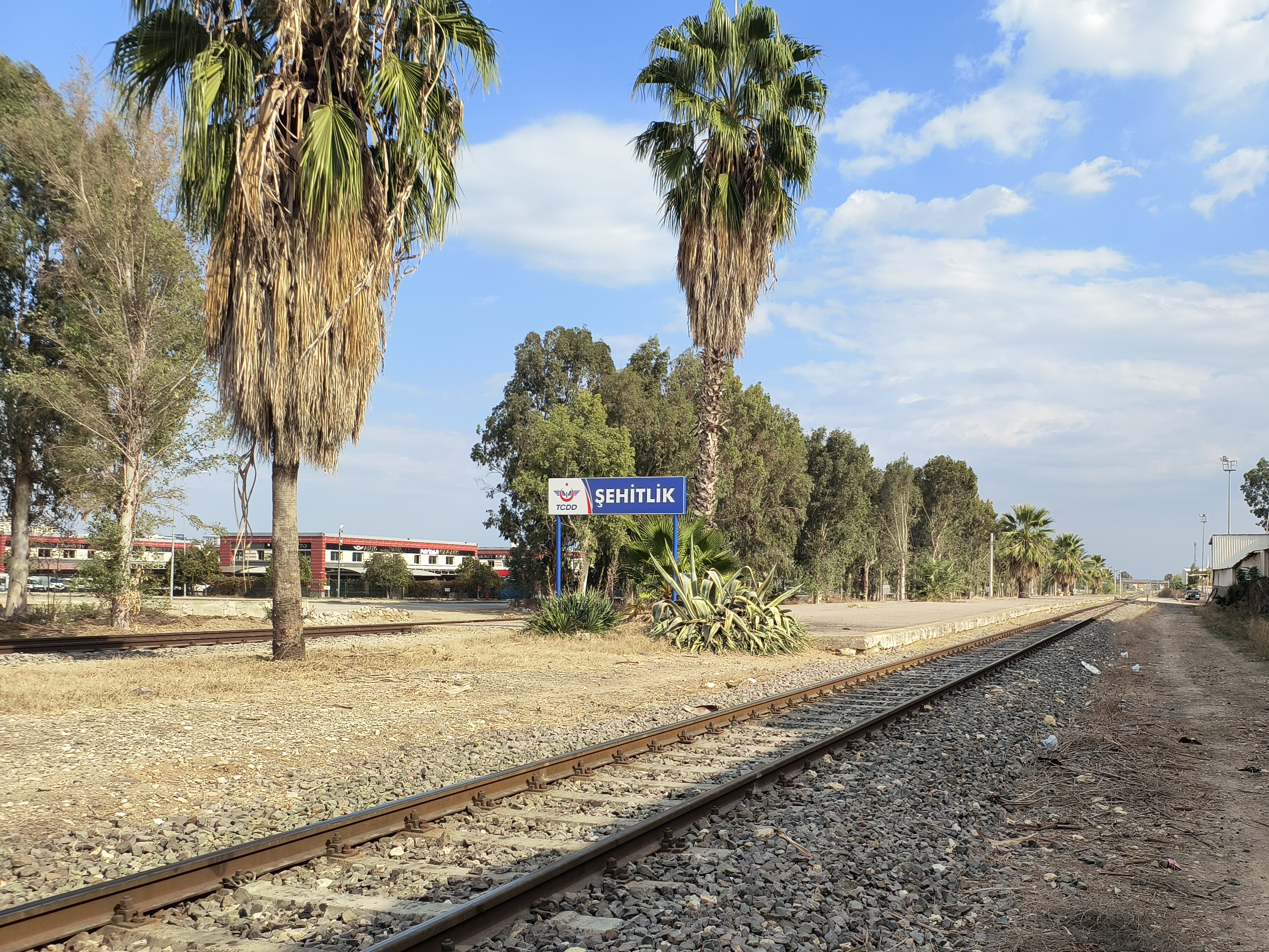
Station Sign

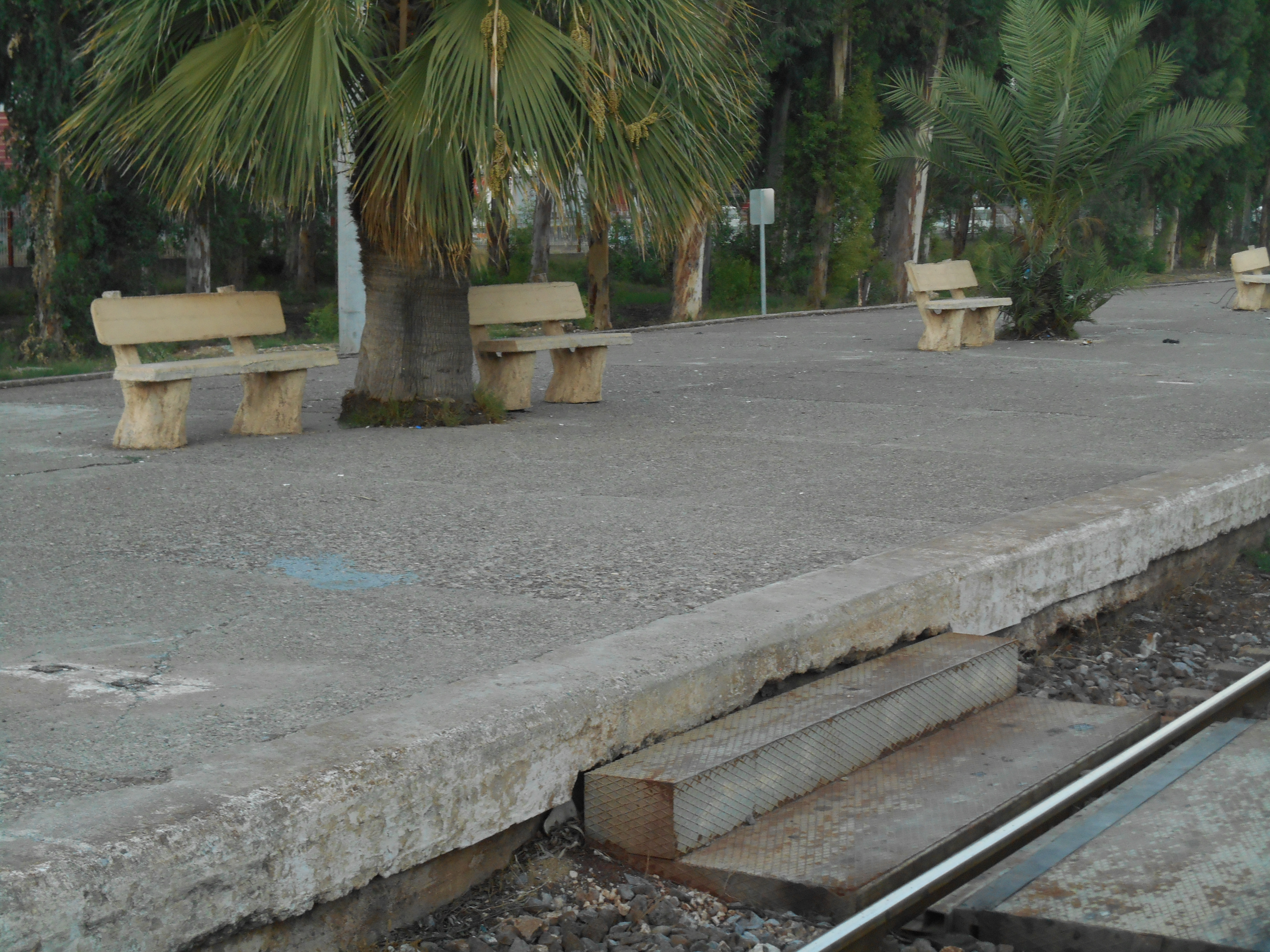
Platform
