= Şakirpaşa railway station =

Railway station in Seyhan, Adana

ŞAKİRPAŞA
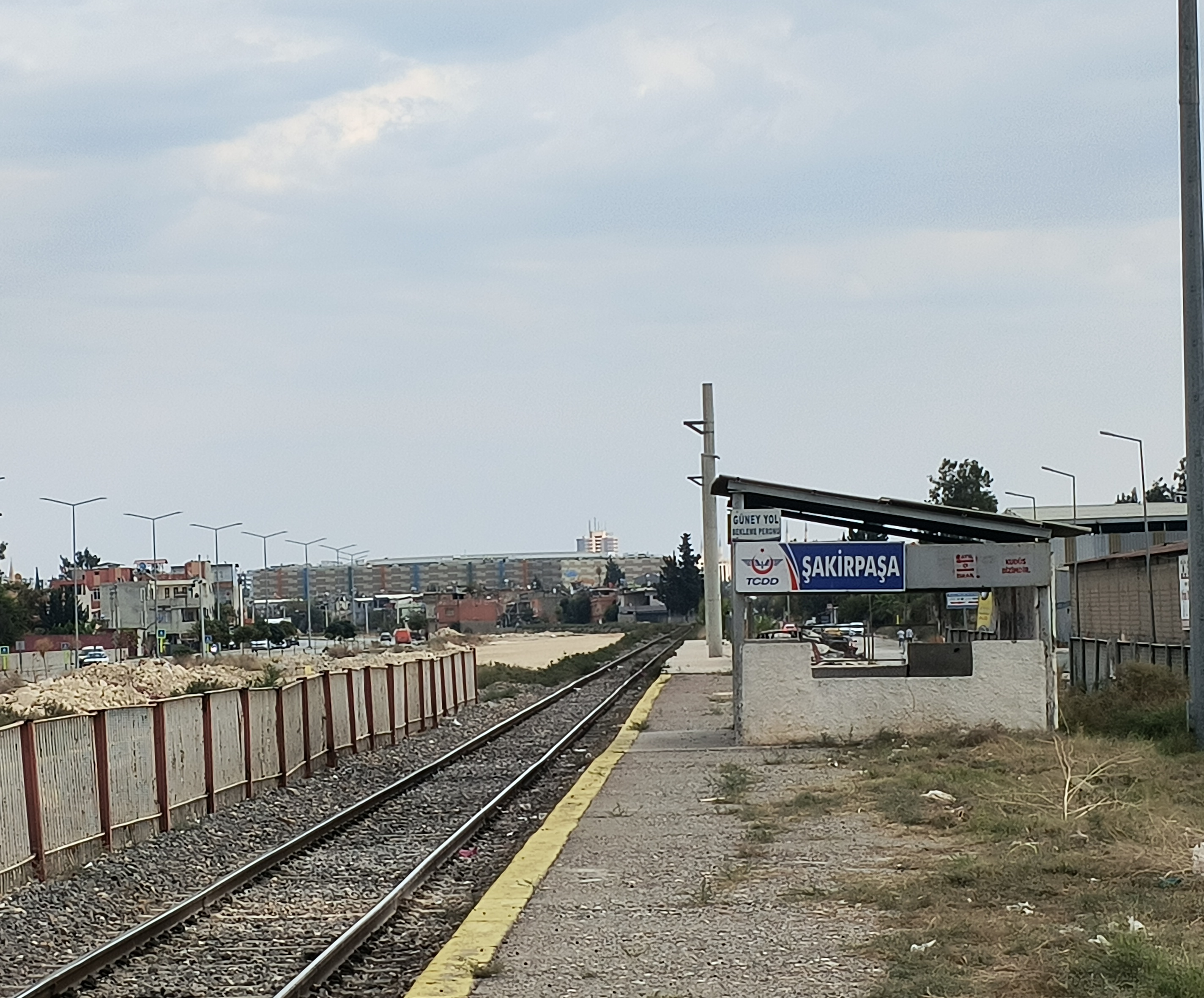

General information
- Location: Ray Sk. & 55002 Sk., Sakarya Mah. 01130; Seyhan, Adana; Turkey
- Coordinates: 36.9961°N 35.2889°E
- System: TCDD Taşımacılık intercity and regional rail station
- Owner: Turkish State Railways
- Operator: TCDD Taşımacılık
- Platforms: 2 side platforms
- Tracks: 2

Construction
- Structure type: At-Grade
- Parking: No

History
- Rebuilt: 1995
- Electrified: March 2016 (25 kV AC, 50 Hz)

Services
Preceding station	TCDD Taşımacılık	Following station
Şehitlik towards Kayseri	Erciyes Express	Adana Terminus
Yenice towards Konya	Taurus Express	Adana Terminus
Şehitlik towards Mersin	Mersin–İslahiye	Adana towards İslahiye
Şehitlik towards Mersin	Mersin–İskenderun	Adana towards İskenderun
Şehitlik towards Mersin	Mersin–Adana	Adana Terminus
Location

Şakirpaşa railway station (Turkish: Şakirpaşa istasyonu) is a railway station in Seyhan, Adana, on the Adana-Mersin railway. The station consists of two side platforms serving two tracks. There is no station building, only a small shelter on each platform. TCDD Taşımacılık operates frequent regional rail service from Mersin to Adana, along with further service to İskenderun and İslahiye. Together with regional trains, two intercity trains stop at Şakirpaşa as well; the Erciyes Express to Kayseri and the Taurus Express to Konya.
