= Yenice railway station =

Railway station in Yenice, Mersin, Turkey

YENİCE
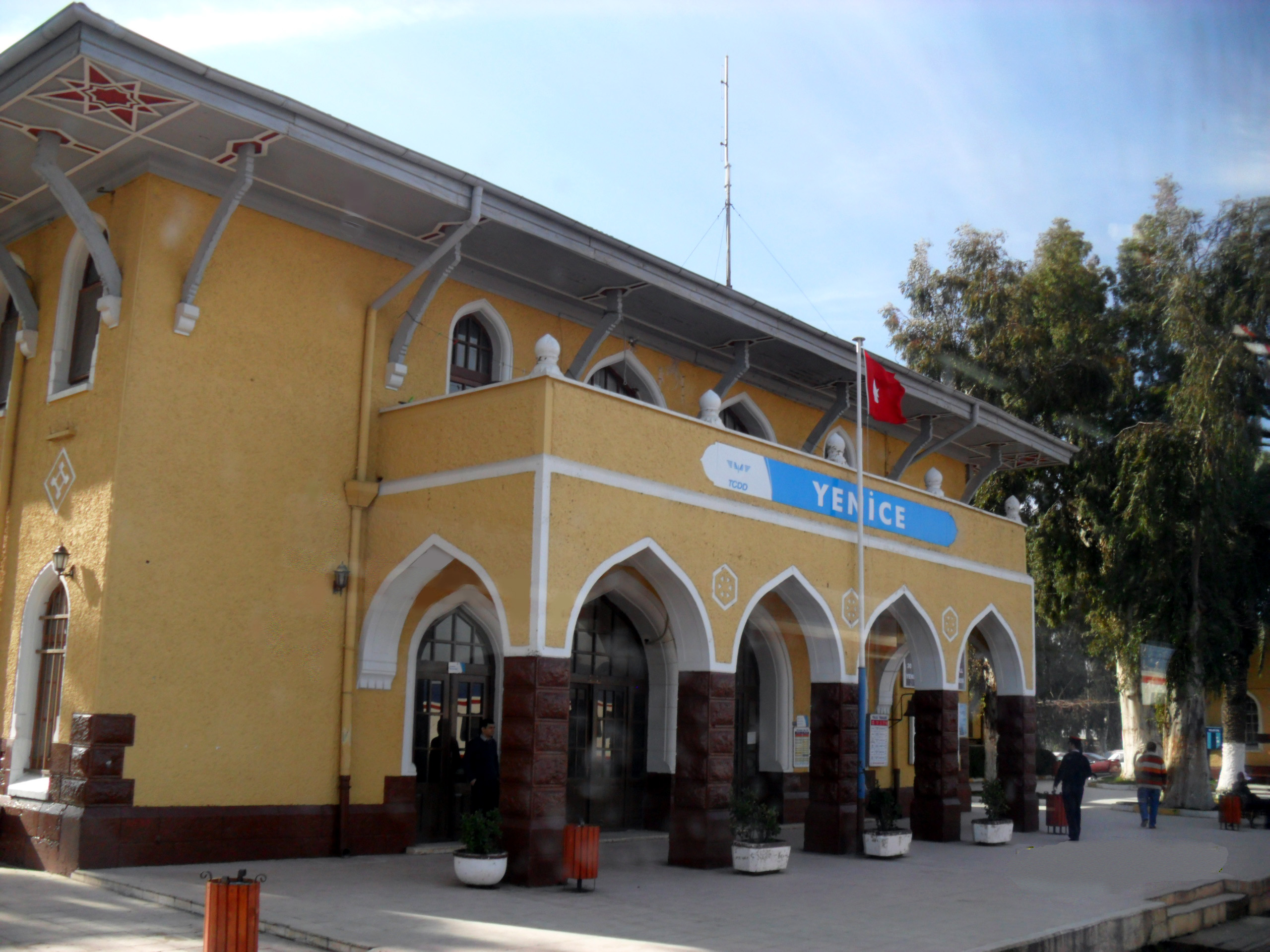
- Yenice Station

General information
- Location: Atatürk Blv., Yenica Mah., 33400 Tarsus/Mersin; Turkey
- Coordinates: 36.974204°N 35.053178°E
- System: TCDD intercity and regional rail station
- Owner: Turkish State Railways
- Lines: TCDD Taşımacılık: Taurus Express; Erciyes Express; Mersin-Adana Regional; Mersin-İslahiye Regional; Mersin-İskenderun Regional
- Platforms: 2 (1 side platform, 1 island platform)
- Tracks: 3

Construction
- Structure type: At-grade

Other information
- Station code: 6633

History
- Opened: 2 August 1886; 140 years ago
- Rebuilt: 1995

Services
Preceding station	TCDD Taşımacılık	Following station
Durak towards Kayseri	Erciyes Express	Şehitlik towards Adana
Durak towards Konya	Taurus Express	Şakirpaşa towards Adana
Tarsus towards Mersin	Mersin–İslahiye	Şehitlik towards İslahiye
Tarsus towards Mersin	Mersin–İskenderun	Şehitlik towards İskenderun
Tarsus towards Mersin	Mersin–Adana	Şehitlik towards Adana
Location
- Location within Turkey

Yenice station (Turkish: Yenice Garı) is a railway station in Yenice, Mersin. Yenice station is on the busy Adana-Mersin Main Line. The station was built in 1886 by the Mersin-Tarsus-Adana Railway.

== Historical Importance ==
Historical Meeting between the Turkish president İsmet İnönü and British prime minister Winston Churchill was held in Yenice Station during the Second World War. There is a bill board about this meeting in the station building.
