= Adana-Mersin Regional =

Railway line in Turkey

Adana-Mersin Bölgesel
Overview
- Service type: Regional rail
- Status: Operating
- Locale: Southern Anatolia
- First service: 1970
- Current operator(s): TCDD

Route
- Termini: Central Station, Adana; Central Station, Mersin
- Stops: 11
- Distance travelled: 67 km (42 mi)
- Average journey time: 45 minutes
- Service frequency: 27 trains per day

On-board services
- Class(es): Unreserved, unnumbered, classless
- Disabled access: Limited
- Seating arrangements: Coach
- Catering facilities: No

Technical
- Rolling stock: TCDD MT30000
- Track gauge: 1,435 mm (4 ft 8 1/2 in)
- Operating speed: 120 km/h (75 mph)
- Track owner(s): TCDD

The Adana Mersin Regional is an intercity rail service operated by the Turkish State Railways. It operates between two major cities of Turkey; Adana and Mersin. It also services Tarsus . The trains operate on the Adana-Mersin Main Line the second busiest rail line in Turkey.

== Stations ==
| Station | Distance (km) from Adana | Rail connections | Other Connections |
|---|---|---|---|
| Adana | 0.0 km (0 mi) | Central Anatolia Blue Train; Çukurova Blue Train; Erciyes Express; Friendship Train; Euphrates Express; İskendurun-Mersin Regional; Mersin-Islahiye Regional | Adana Metro; Bus: 111, 130, 131, 132, 163, 172 |
| Şakirpaşa | 2.8 km (1.7 mi) | Mersin-Islahiye Regional; İskendurun-Mersin Regional | - |
| Şehitlik | 6.9 km (4.3 mi) | Mersin-Islahiye Regional; İskendurun-Mersin Regional | - |
| Zeytinli | 16 km (9.9 mi) | Mersin-Islahiye Regional | - |
| Yenice | 23.9 km (14.9 mi) | Central Anatolia Blue Train; Çukurova Blue Train; Erciyes Express; İskendurun-Mersin Regional; Mersin-Islahiye Regional | - |
| Tarsus | 40.9 km (25.4 mi) | İskendurun-Mersin Regional; Mersin-Islahiye Regional | - |
| Huzurkent | 48.1 km (29.9 mi) | İskendurun-Mersin Regional; Mersin-Islahiye Regional | - |
| Taşkent | 53 km (33 mi) | İskendurun-Mersin Regional; Mersin-Islahiye Regional | - |
| Karacailyas | 58.9 km (36.6 mi) | İskendurun-Mersin Regional; Mersin-Islahiye Regional | - |
| Tırmıl | 61.2 km (38.0 mi) | İskendurun-Mersin Regional; Mersin-Islahiye Regional | - |
| Mersin | 67.1 km (41.7 mi) | Friendship Train; İskendurun-Mersin Regional; Mersin-Islahiye Regional | - |
