= Yeşiloba, Seyhan =

Yeşiloba
- Neighbourhood
- Location in Turkey
- Coordinates: 36°59′56″N 35°14′14″E
- Country: Turkey
- Province: Adana
- District: Seyhan

Government
  - Muhtar: Ali Yaylalı
- Elevation: 30 m (98 ft)
- Population (2022): 15,242
- Time zone: UTC+3 (TRT)
- Area code: 0322

Yeşiloba is a neighbourhood (mahalle) in the municipality and district of Seyhan, Adana Province, Turkey. Its population is 15,242 (2022). The neighbourhood is situated on both sides of D400 state road, 8 km west of the historical downtown of Adana.

== Governance ==
Yeşiloba is a mahalle and it is administered by the Muhtar and the Seniors Council.

== Economy ==
Yeşiloba mahalle is surrounded by industrial areas, therefore most of the residents work at the factories around.

== Transport ==
Major transportation link of the Yeşiloba mahalle is the Şehitlik railway station within the borders of the neighborhood.

Adana Metropolitan Municipality Bus Department (ABBO) has bus routes from Yeşiloba to downtown Adana.
