= Adana railway station =

Railway station of Adana, Turkey

ADANA
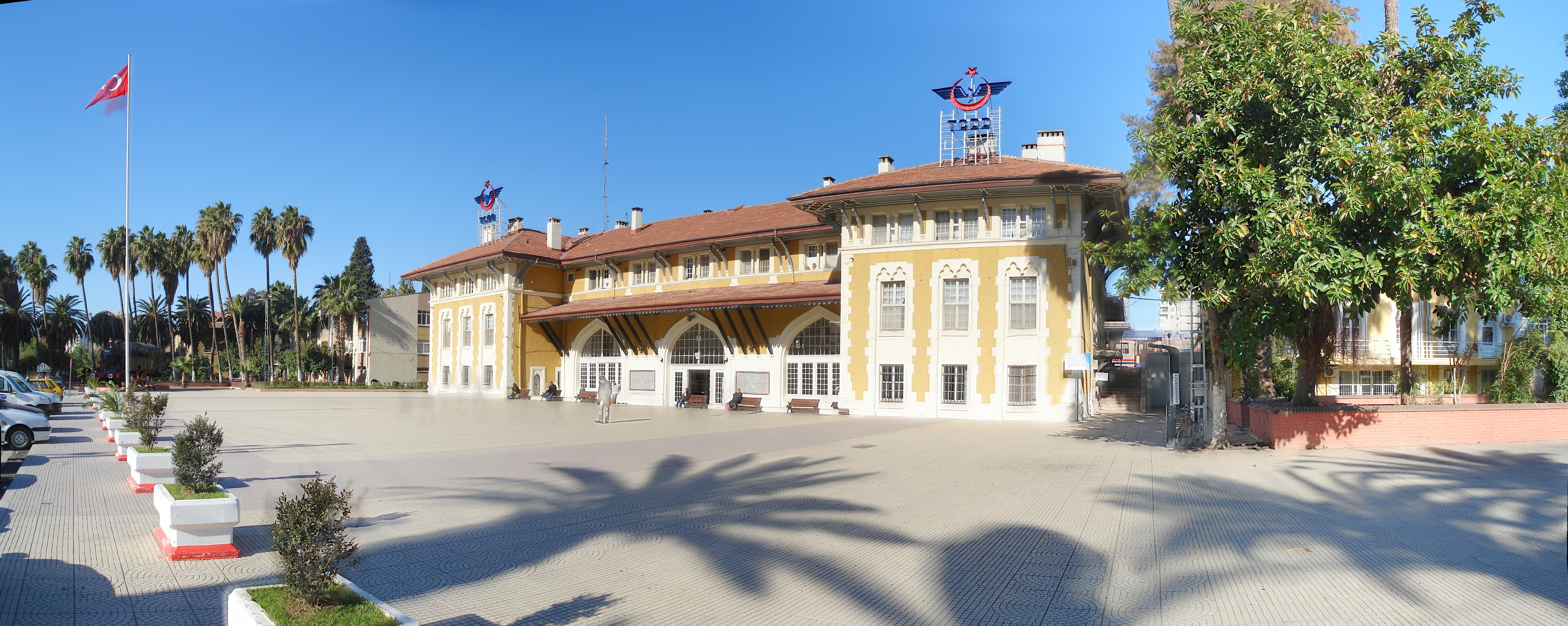
- Main building

General information
- Location: Uğur Mumcu Meydanı, Kurtuluş Mah., Seyhan/Adana 01130; Turkey
- Coordinates: 37°00′13″N 35°19′09″E
- System: TCDD intercity and regional rail station
- Owner: Turkish State Railways
- Operator: TCDD Taşımacılık
- Lines: Adana-Mersin railway Adana-Aleppo railway
- Platforms: 2 (1 island platform, 1 side platform)
- Tracks: 3

Construction
- Structure type: At-grade
- Parking: Yes
- Architectural style: Turkish Neoclassical

Other information
- Station code: 6503

History
- Opened: 1886; 140 years ago (First station); 1912; 114 years ago (Current station)

Services
Preceding station	TCDD Taşımacılık	Following station
Şakirpaşa towards Kayseri	Erciyes Express	Terminus
Şakirpaşa towards Konya	Taurus Express	Terminus
Terminus	Euphrates Express	Kiremithane towards Elazığ
Şakirpaşa towards Mersin	Mersin–İslahiye	Kiremithane towards İslahiye
Şakirpaşa towards Mersin	Mersin–İskenderun	Kiremithane towards İskenderun
Şakirpaşa towards Mersin	Mersin–Adana	Terminus
Former services
Preceding station	Turkish State Railways	Following station
Yenice towards Ankara	Çukurova Blue Train	Terminus
Location

Adana station (Turkish: Adana garı) is a railway station in Adana and the major railway hub of the region. The station is located at the İstasyon Square, in Kurtuluş, Seyhan.

The Central Station is steps away from the Vilayet Metro station and the Adana Provincial Hall. It surrounds the İstasyon Square together with the Central Post Office, Türk Telekom and TCDD Regional Headquarters.

== History ==
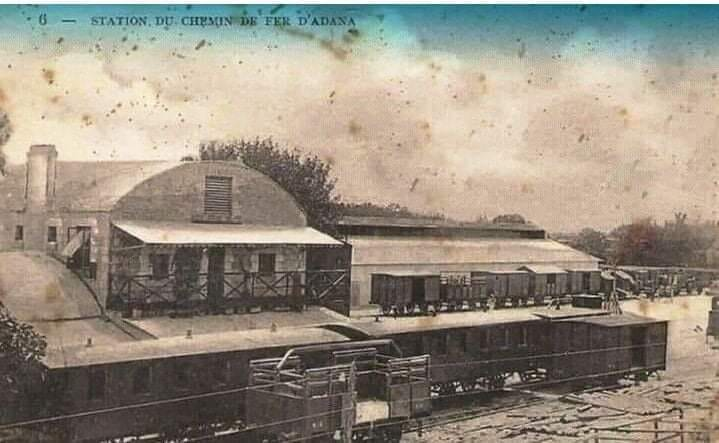
First station was built in 1886

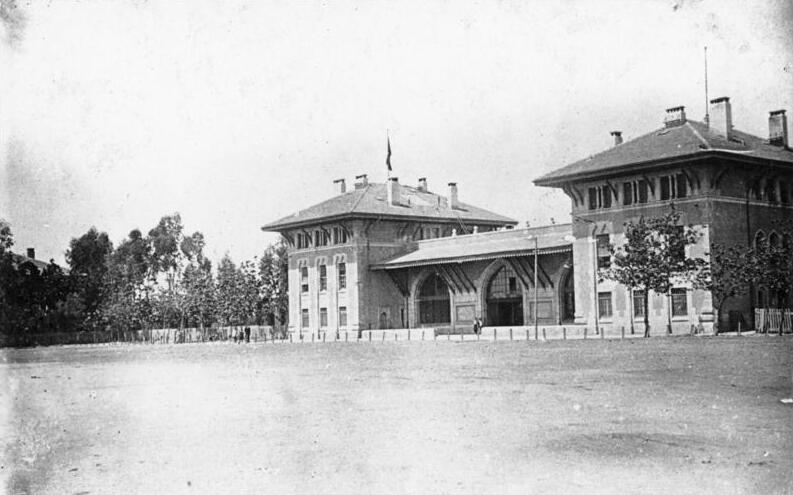
Current station building in 1913

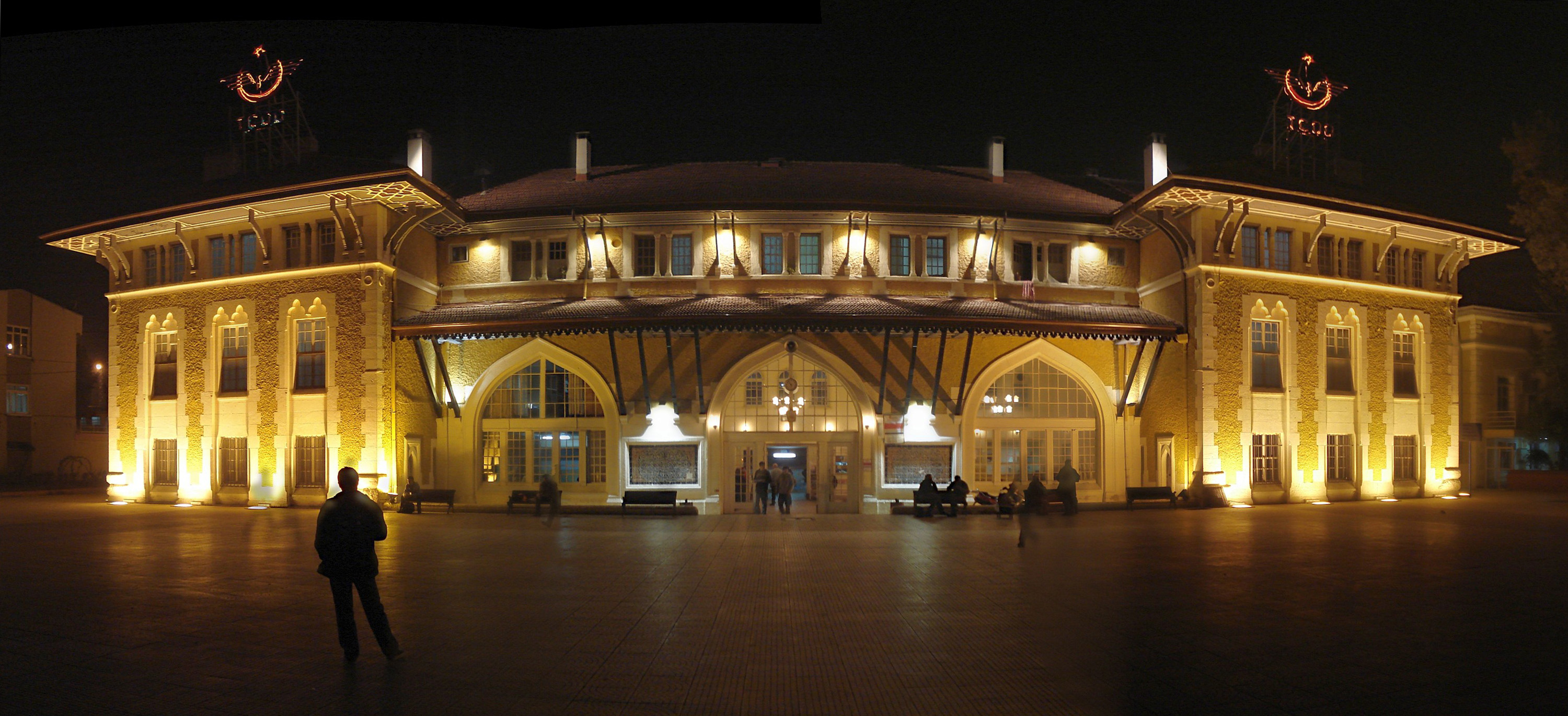
Adana Gar by night

The first railway station in Adana was built in 1886 in the Kuruköprü area along the 67 km (42 mi) railway line that connected Adana to Mersin. In 1903, the Ottoman Government contracted Istanbul-Baghdad section of the Berlin-Baghdad Railway project to Germany. In 1911, the Yenice-Adana section of the Mersin-Adana railway line was merged with the Berlin-Baghdad railway project. The status of the Adana railway station was raised to a major station with the expected increase in volume. A larger station building and maintenance shops were needed to be built, but the existing train station was not suitable for expansion. The construction of a new train station was started in 1911 on farmland north of the city. The construction of the new railway station was completed in September 1912, covering an area of 45 hectares, containing a station building, staff residences, maintenance shops and a foundry. The first station continued to serve to the Mersin-Adana Railway line until 1940s.

== Architecture ==
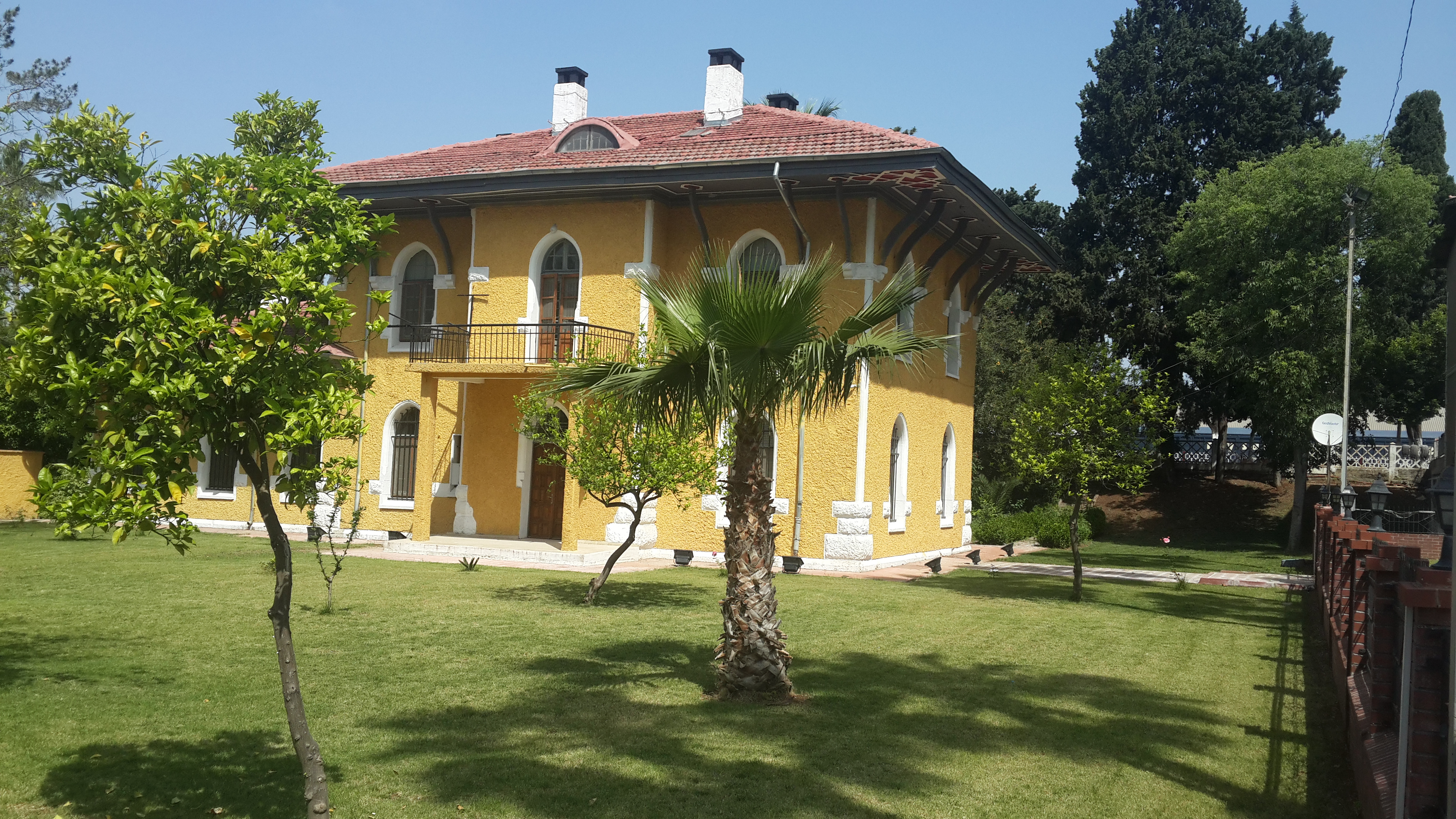
Department of Systems Safety

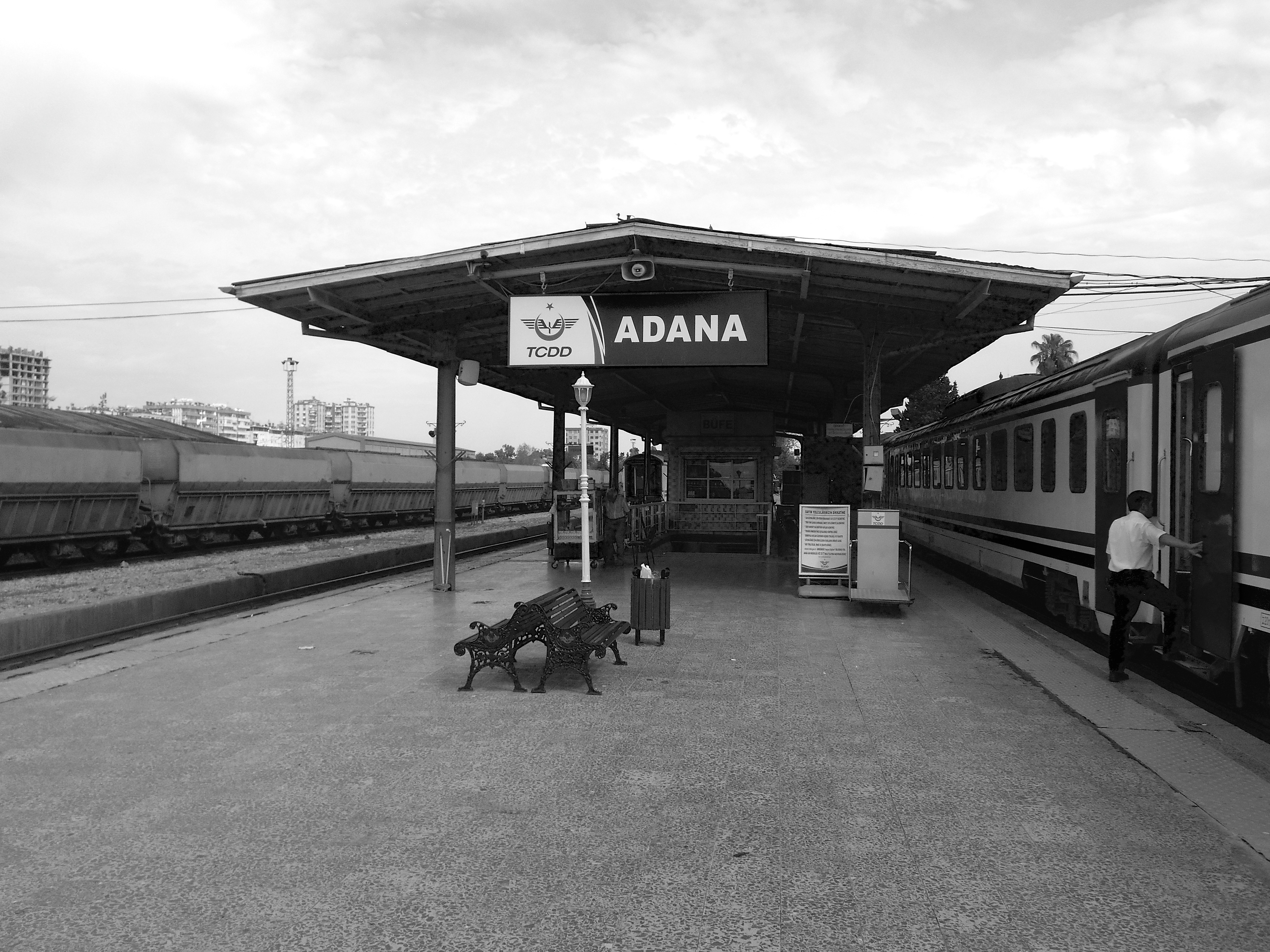
Station sign

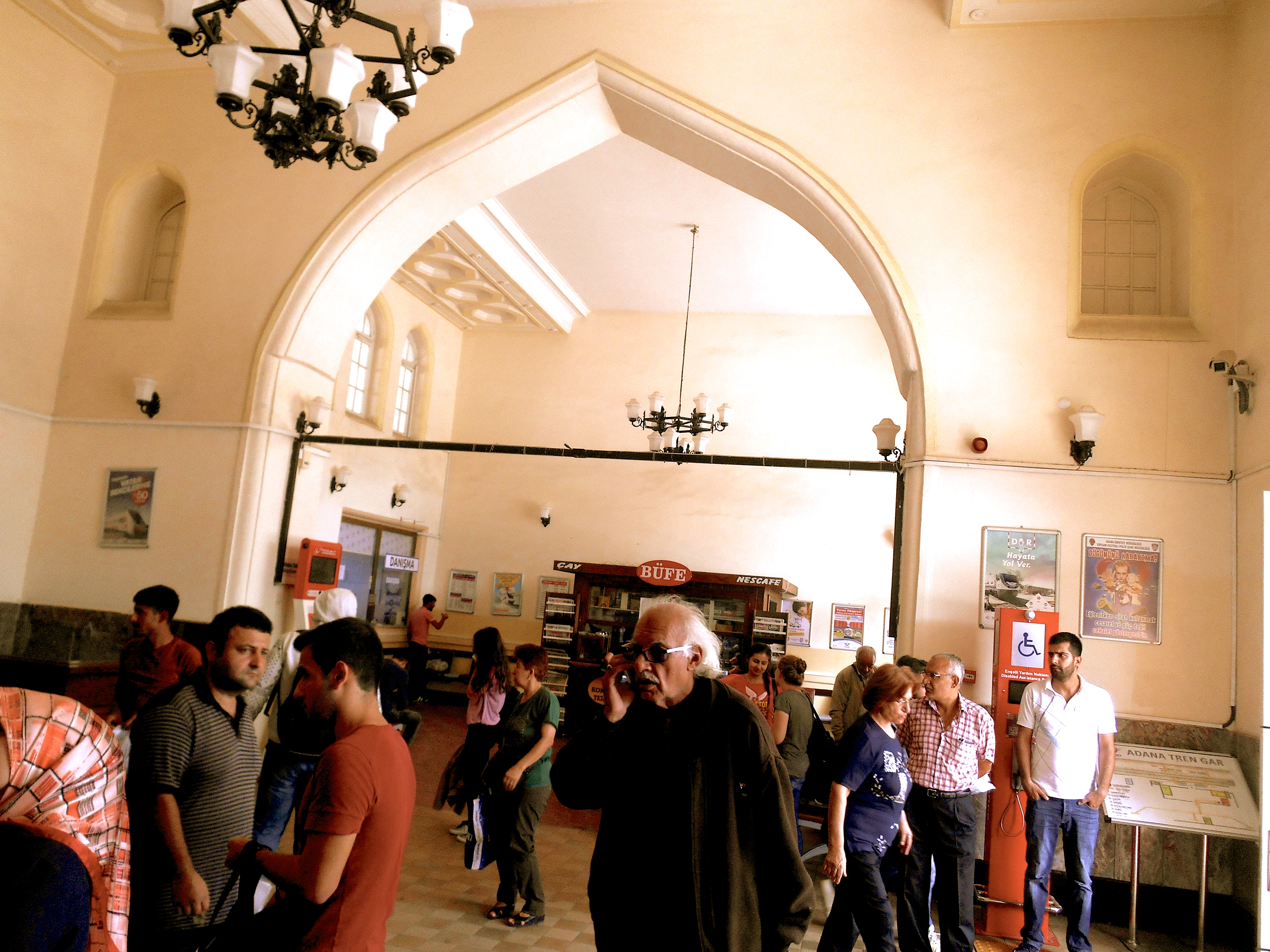
Passenger hall

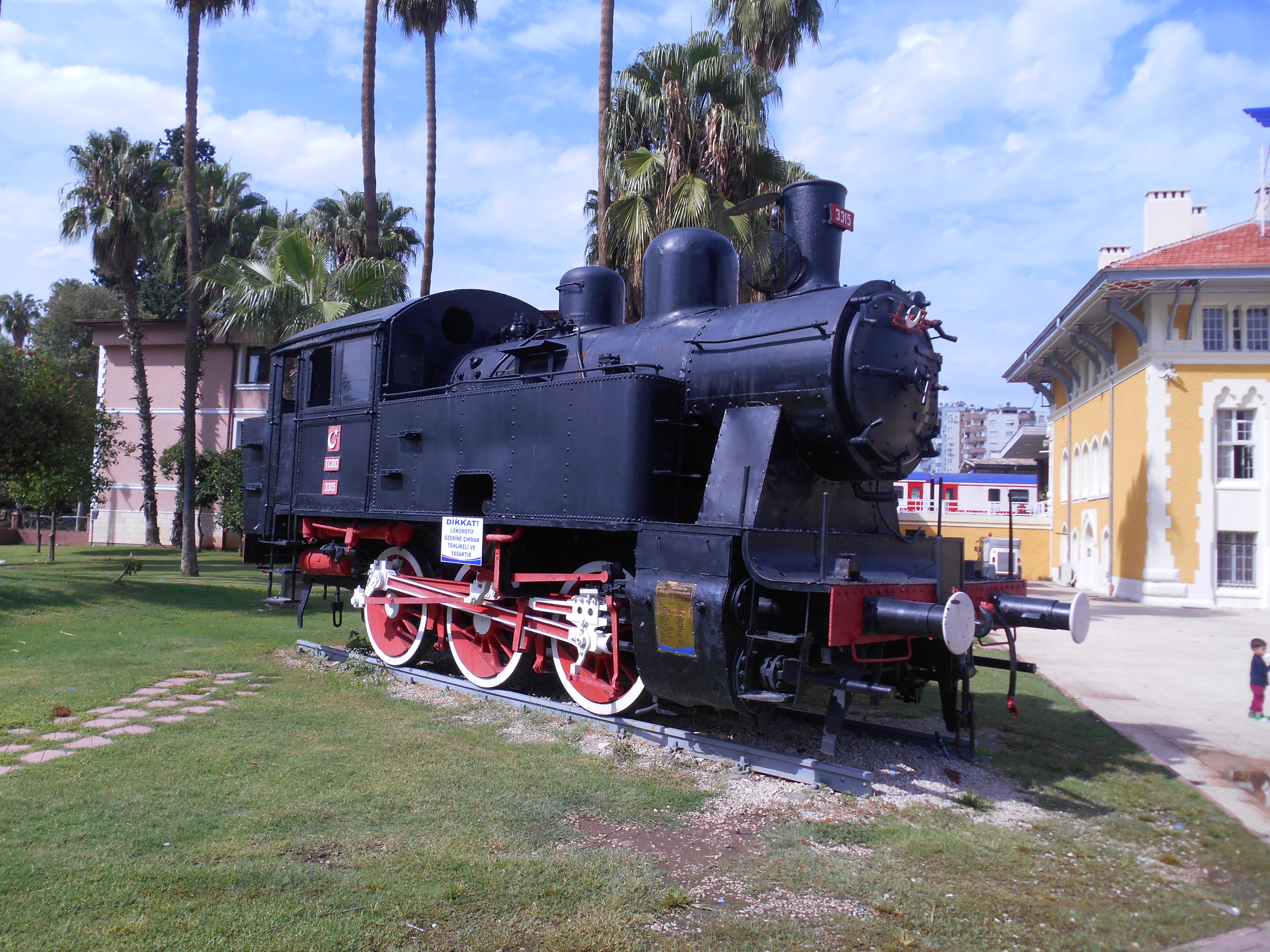
1929 model locomotive at the İstasyon Square

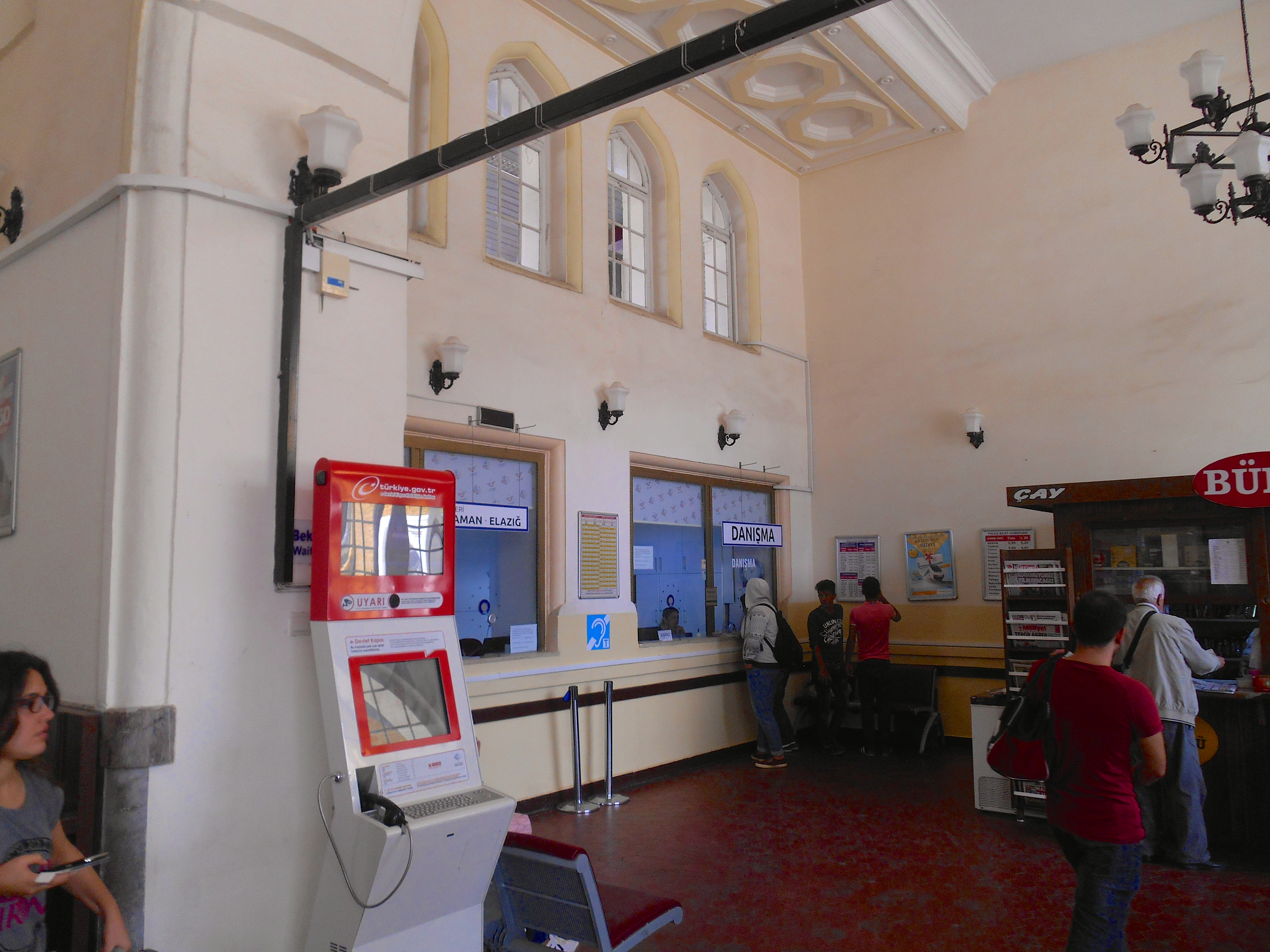
Ticket booth

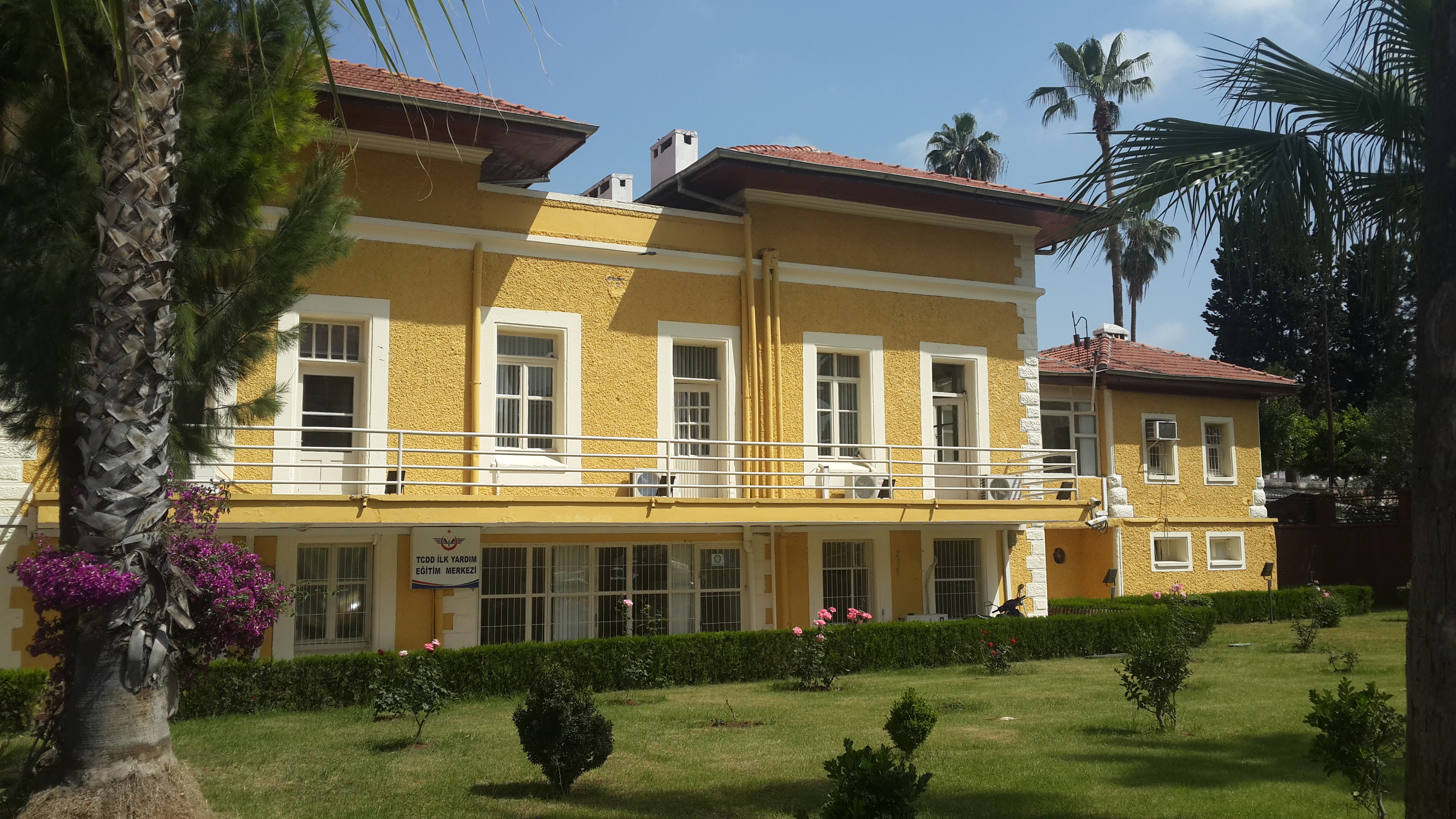
Training center

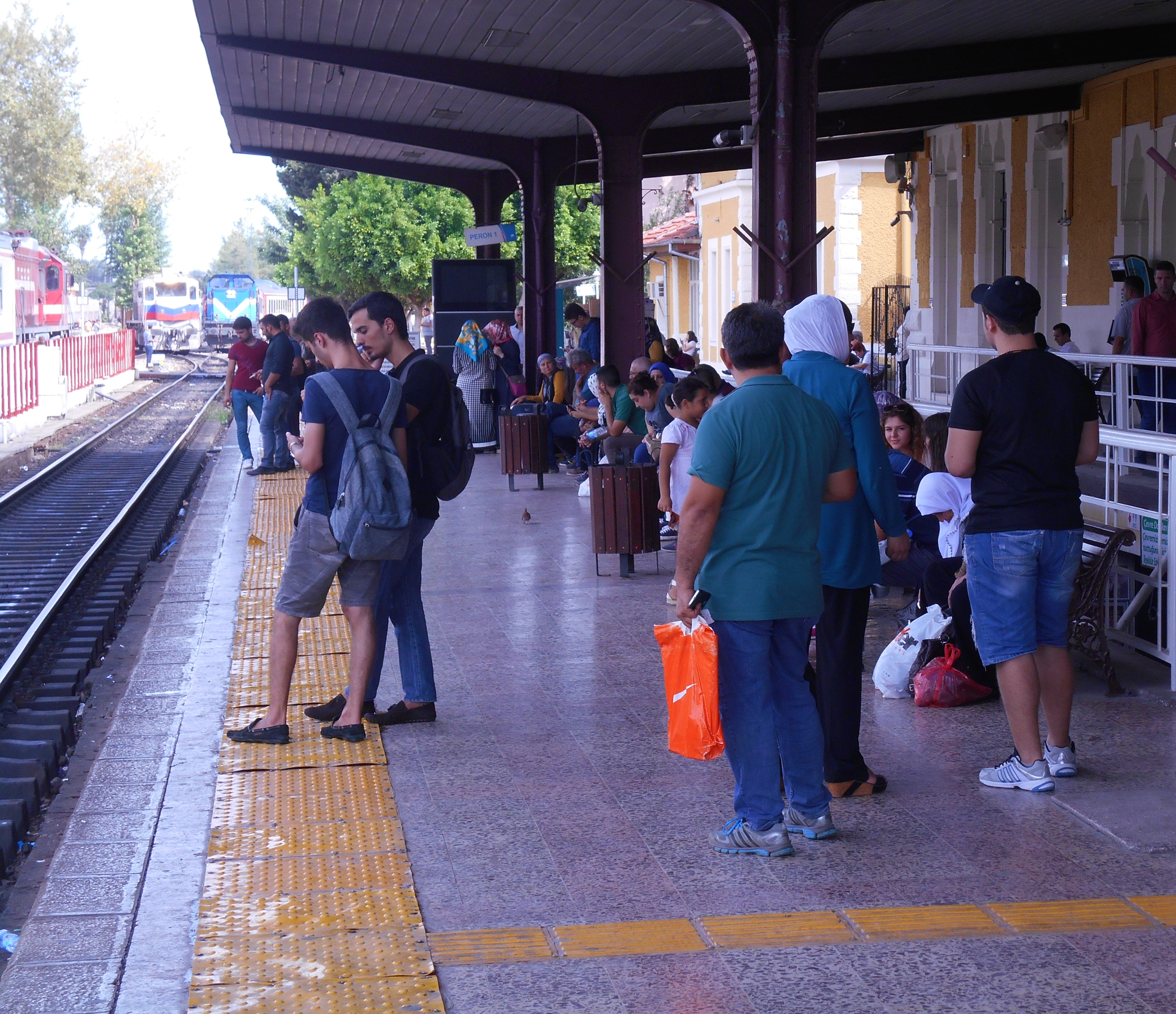
Platform I

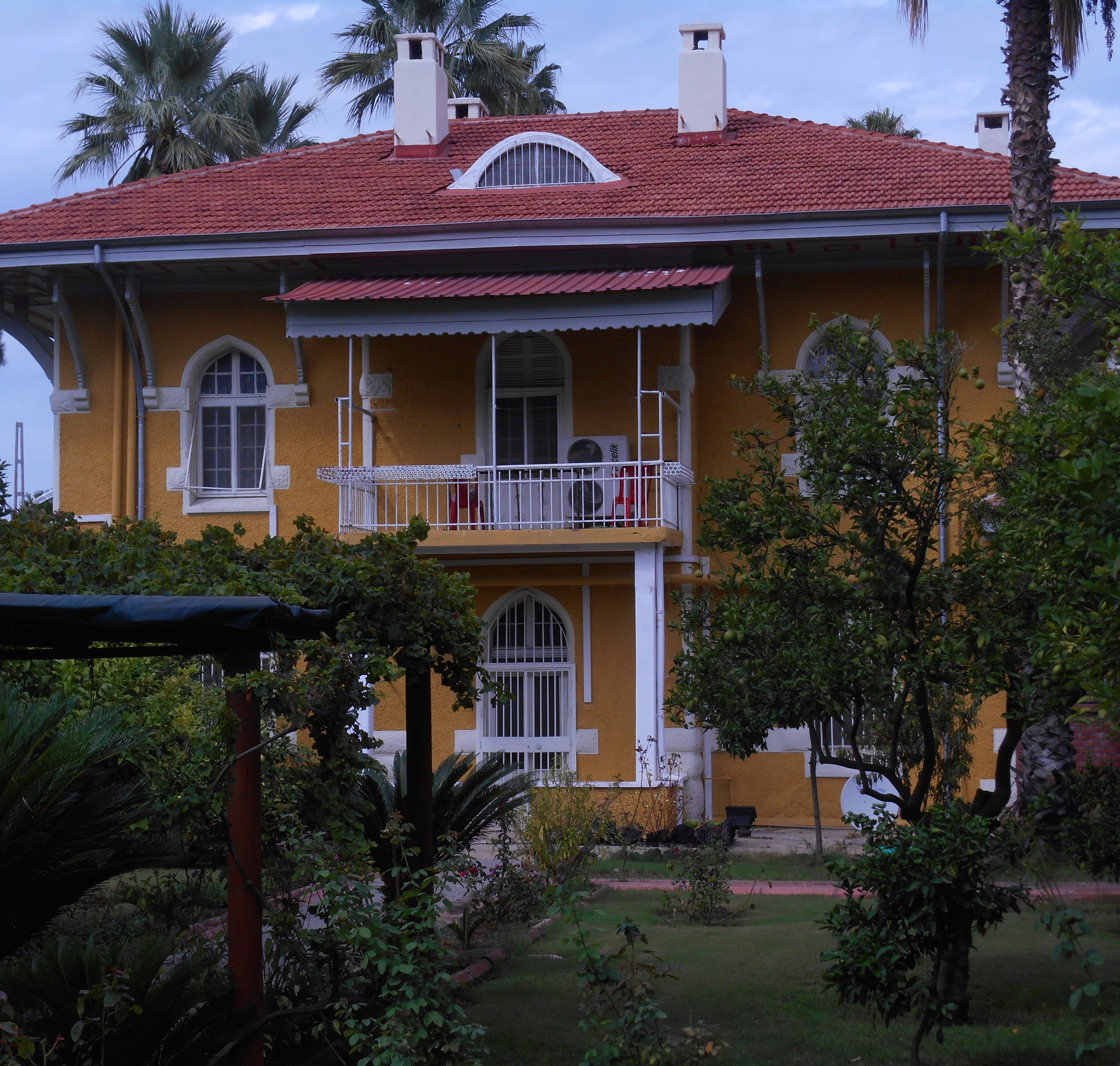
TCDD Mansion

The station building is built in the First National Architectural Style. It is a 3-storey structure with wide eaves and a triangular roof and has a U-plan in which the open area faces the square. The middle section, which connects to the square through three sharp arch gates, is the main hall with a high ceiling and includes the waiting room, ticket offices and the information desk. The middle section also splits into three areas. The two areas on the right side of the middle section comprise two floors. Above the area on the left side, there is a cafe which is entered from Platform I. Below the cafe, there are the ticket offices and the check room. There are administrative offices at the north part of the east and the west wing of the building, facing platform I. The offices at the west wing are designated for the station manager and the assistant, and the ones on the east wing are designated for security and other services. On the upper floor, there are six residences of different sizes. The residences on the wings are larger than the residences above the main hall. The residences above the main hall are accessed from the stairs at the wings.

The main hall, which is two floors high is spacious. The four-piece window sets, facing Platform I at the upper section of the north walls, provide plenty of light to the hall. The bands that are covered with geometric forms, stretching in east-west direction on the ceiling, also add quality to the space. The light shining from the roof to the stairwells on both wings is a unique feature. The eaves surrounding the roof on the upper portion of the wings and the twin window sets beneath, the wide eaves extending all along above the arch gates at the middle section of the elegantly designed building front show that horizontal elements are dominant in the architecture. The ground and the first floor windows in front of the wings are in vertical frame, forming a more stable image. The elements that surround the windows have a perpendicular effect and finish with 3-slice twin blind arches which further increases perpendicularity. Thin mouldings beneath the twin window sets of the second floor which wrap around the entire building, and hewn stones which overflow from the surface at the corners and the wood supports of the wide eaves, are elements that build the architectural identity of the building's frontage.

The north side of the building facing platform I is two-storey. Eaves and the upper floor windows are identical to the front side. Also like the front side, three-slice twin blind arches are placed above the doors and the windows of the offices that are at the same level with platform I. The other features of this side is the two four-piece windows that provide view to the main lobby downstairs. Wide eaves that are added to this side after prevents it to be perceived as a whole. The west and the east sides of the building are designed with a simpler perception than the front side. The features that are formed with slice arches are not used at these sides. Ornaments of the building are the two large rectangular-shaped faience panels on both sides of the main entrance, the faiences that placed in a niche at the section of the west and east wings that face the main entrance and the geometric shaped ornaments at the bottom surface of the eaves.

== Station layout ==
Adana Central railway station has two platforms and four tracks. Track I and Track II are reserved for Adana-Mersin Regional trains. Track III is for the rest of the passenger lines that stop at the station. Track IV has no platform, therefore serves freight trains that cross the station without stopping. Platforms are connected to the Station Hall through an underground walkway. Both platforms are wheelchair accessible with designated escalators. Lockers for daily luggage storage, are located at the walkway.

Passenger platforms can only be accessed through the Main Station Building, either from inside, or through the sides of the building. Vilayet Metro Station is accessed by walking from the Main Building towards west, on the street parallel to the station. There is no passenger entrance north of the tracks, from the Mustafa Kemalpaşa Boulevard to the station.

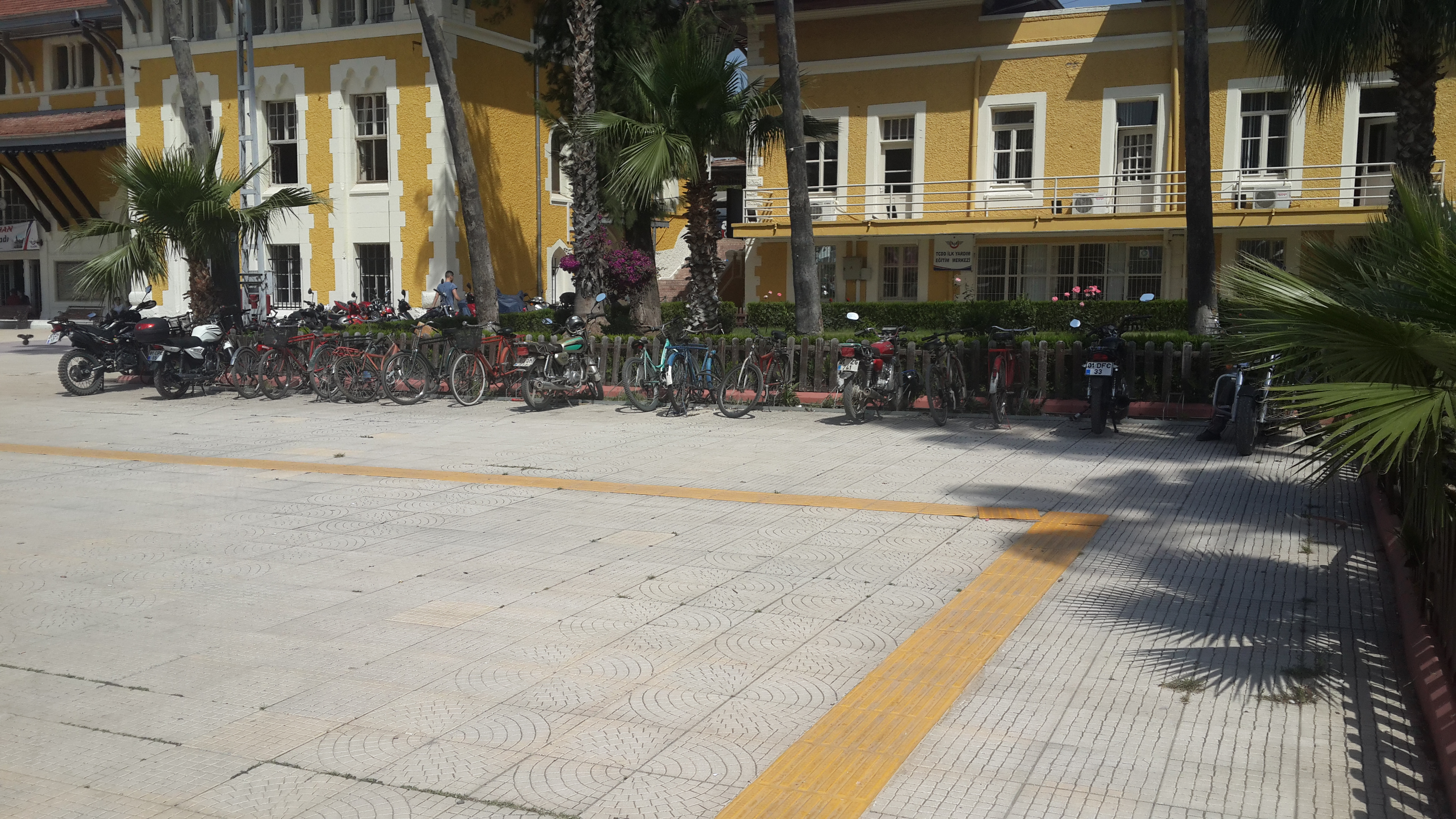
Bicycle Parking at the station

=== Bicycles and car parking ===
Bicycles are not permitted at any of the Passenger Line that stop at the station as a TCDD policy, though the train conductors let bicycles into the Main Line (long distance) and to the Regional trains, if the trains are not full. Bicycles are not permitted to the high-speed trains of the Adana-Mersin Line at all. Bicycle parking is located at the east wing of the Main Hall.

There is a paid car parking in front of the Main Station at the İstasyon Square.

== Service ==
Final Destination	Type / Line	Previous St.	Next St.	Frequency
Mersin	Regional / Adana-Mersin	Terminus	Şakirpaşa	27 services daily
İskenderun	Regional / Iskenderun-Mersin	Şakirpaşa	Kiremithane	daily at 19:00
İslahiye	Regional / İslahiye-Mersin	Şakirpaşa	İncirlik	daily at 18:35
Karaman	Mainline / Toros Ekspresi	Terminus	Şakirpaşa	daily at 07:45
Ankara	Mainline / Çukurova Ekspresi	Terminus	Yenice	daily at 19:30
Elazığ	Mainline / Fırat Ekspresi	Terminus	İncirlik	daily at 07:40
Kayseri	Mainline / Erciyes Ekspresi	Terminus	Şakirpaşa	suspended until 31.12.2016
Konya	Mainline / İç Anadolu Mavi Treni	Terminus	Yenice	suspended until further notice

== Buses ==
Central station is accessed by Municipality Buses. Bus #174 is an hour-interval service that connects the station to the Central Coach Terminal, Yüreğir Coach Terminal and to the D400 state road. Bus #111 is a 40-minute interval service that connects the station to the old town and the Taşköprü area. Both buses stop in front of the main building.

Bus #159 is a 35-minute interval service that connects the station to the Şakirpaşa airport and the old town. The bus stop is at the Vilayet Metro Station, west of the Central Station's main building.

== Images ==
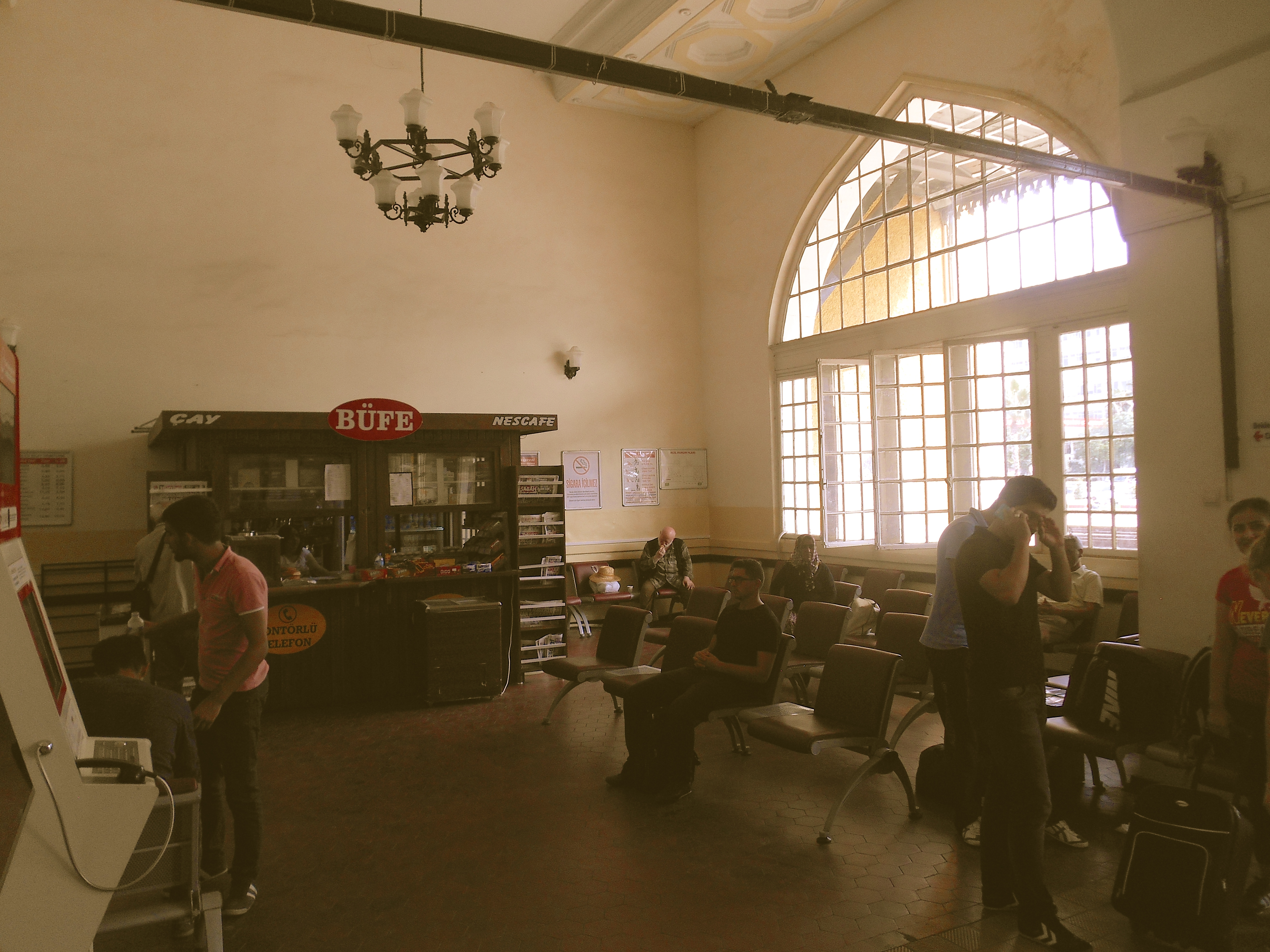
Passenger Hall

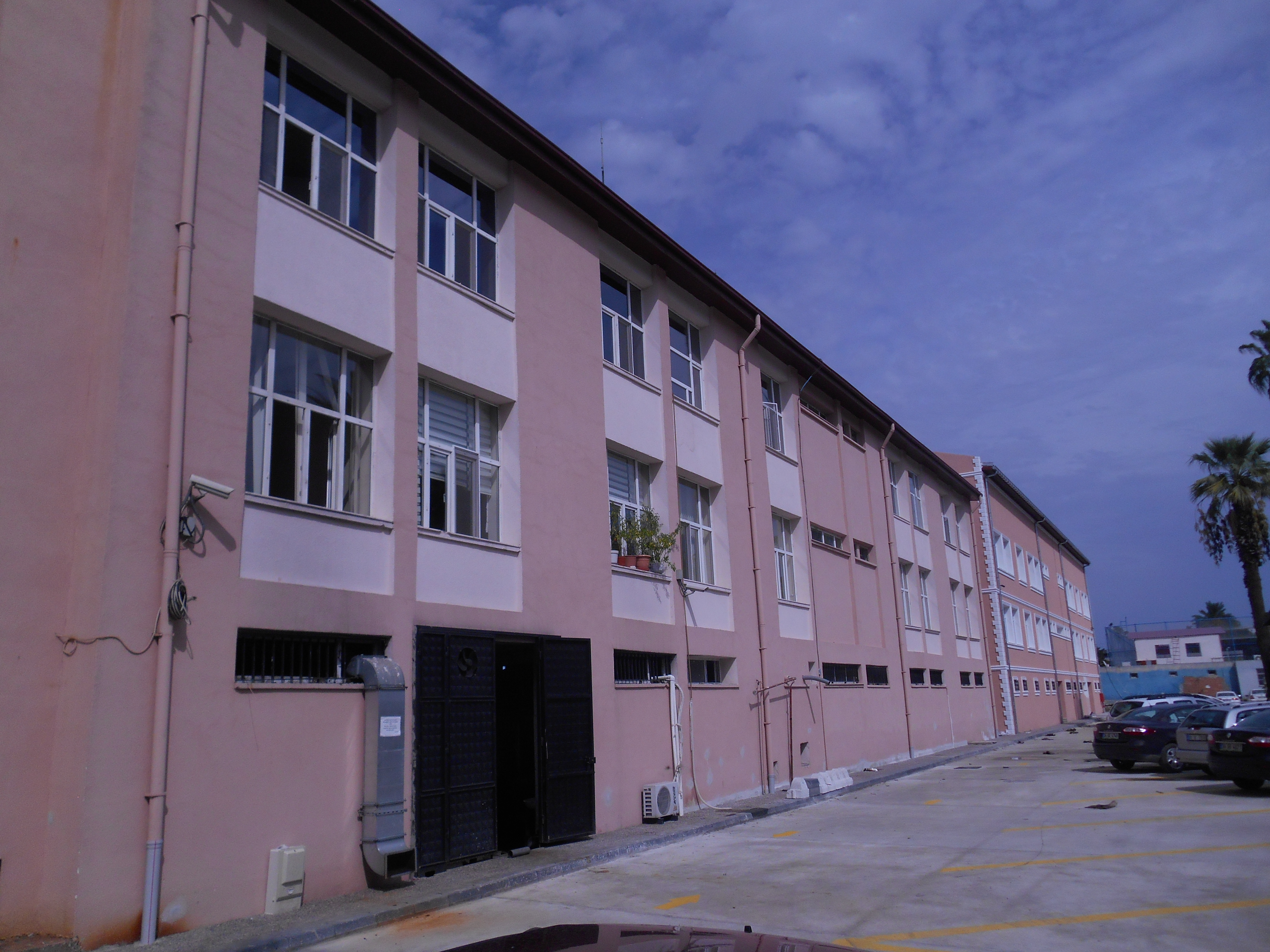
Office Buildings

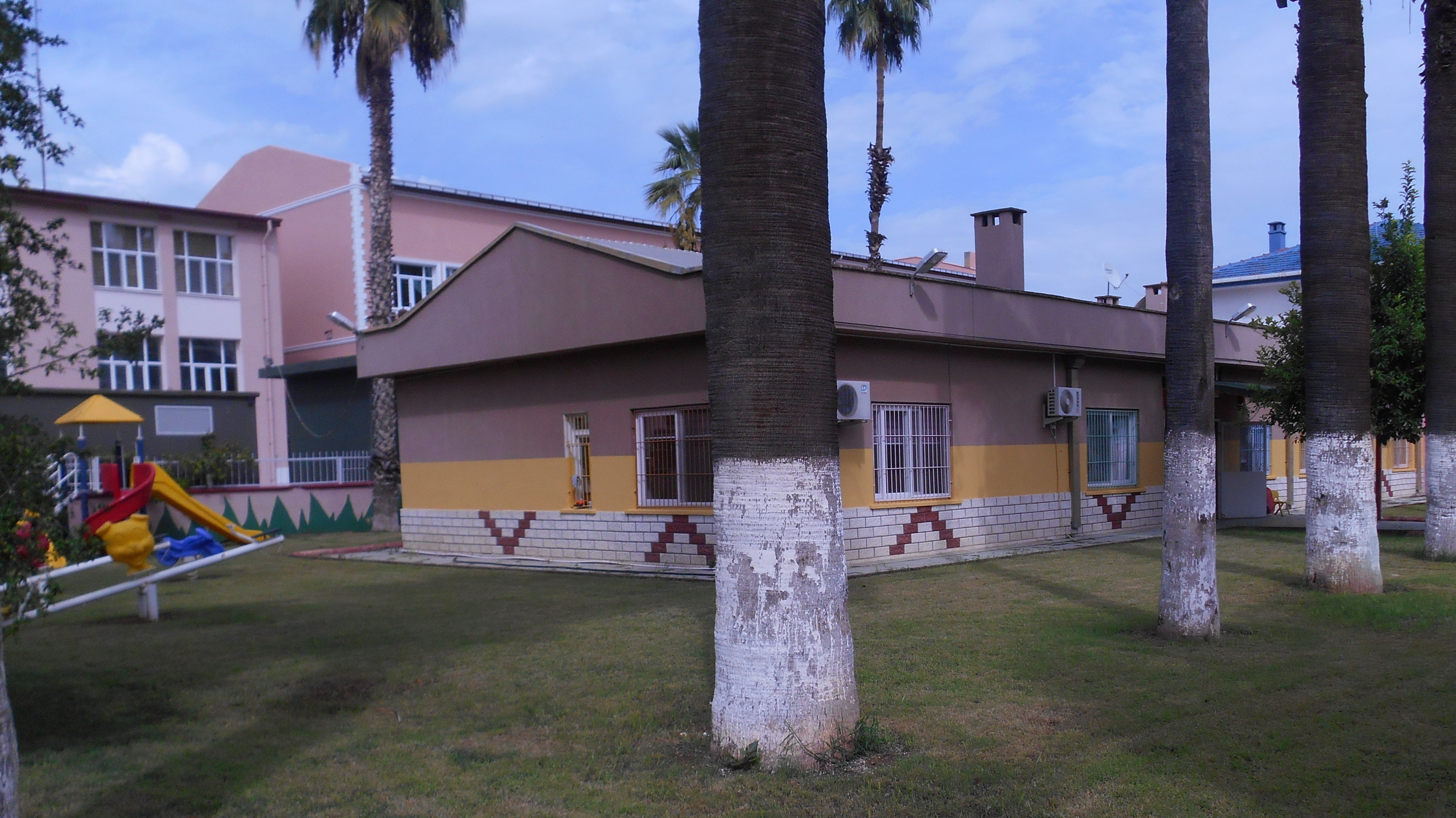
Child care

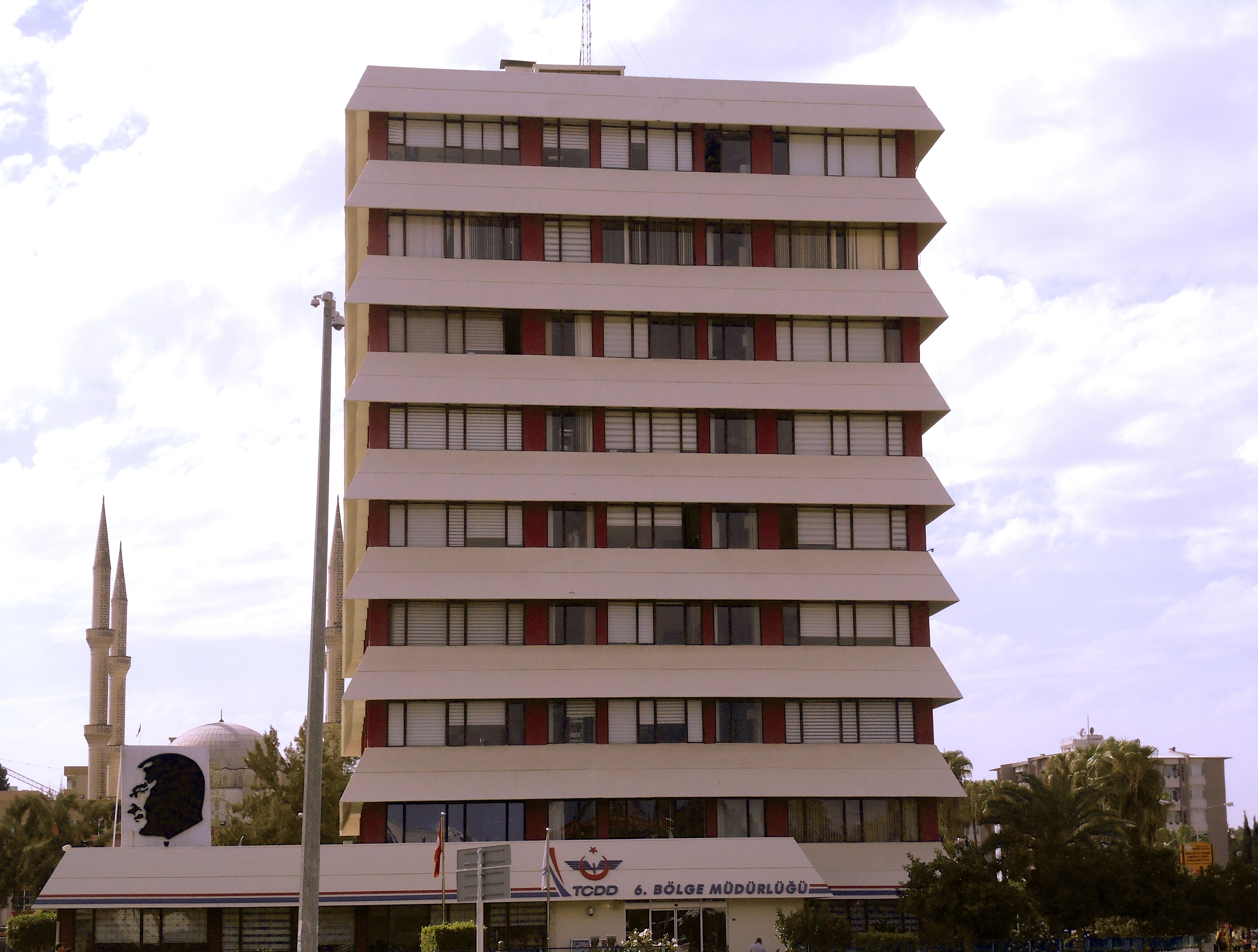
TCDD Regional Headquarters

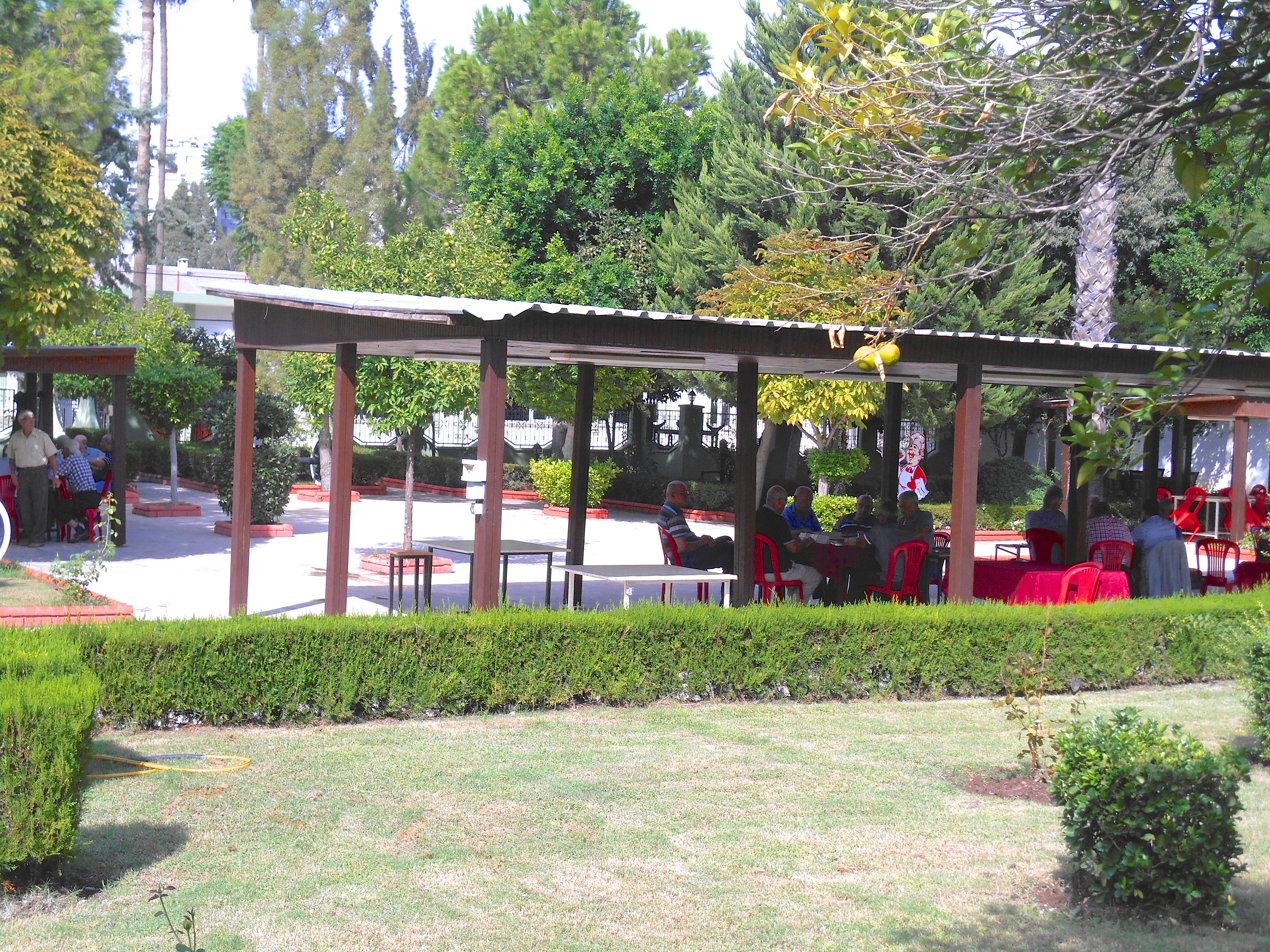
TCDD Lounge

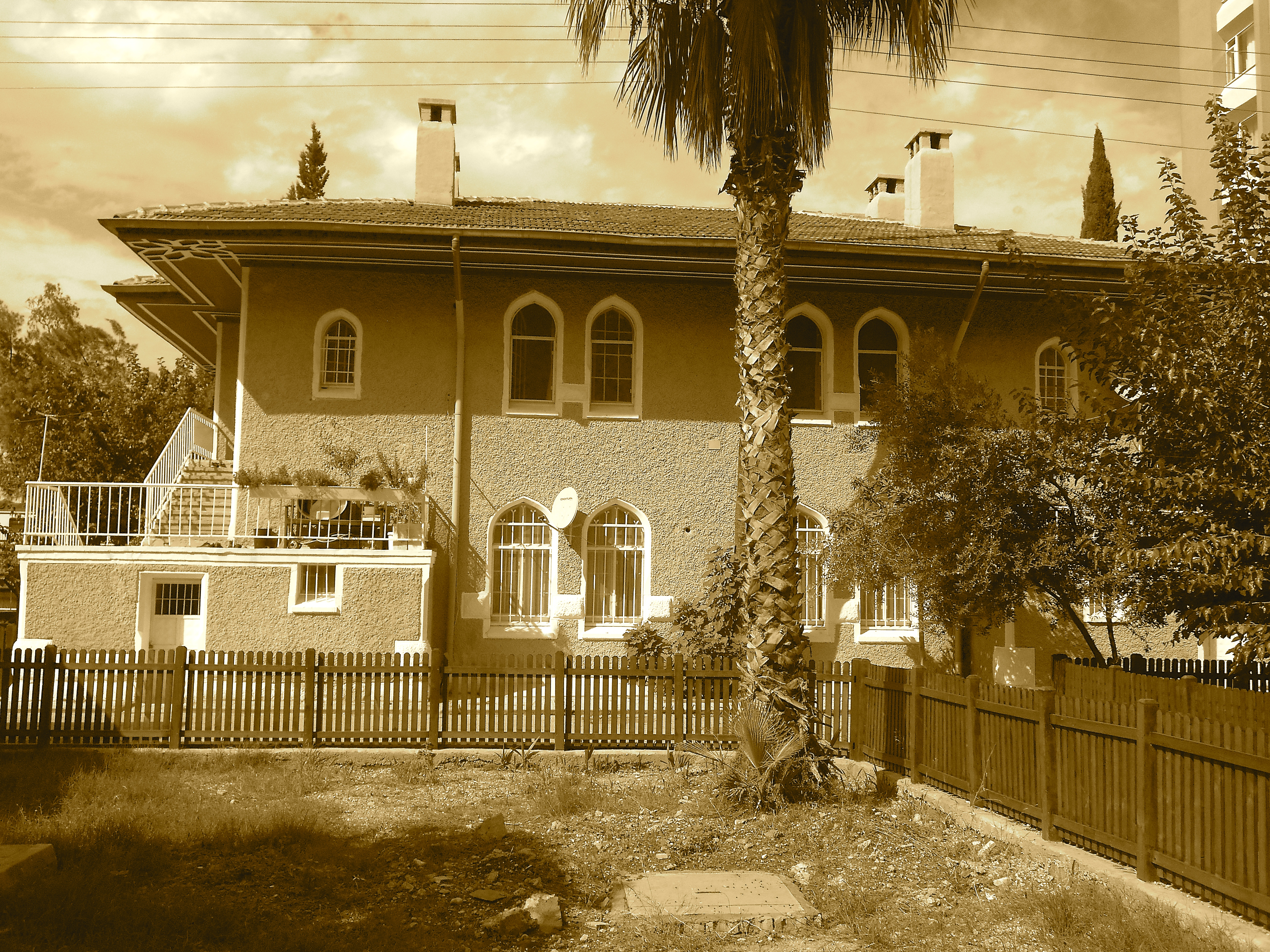
Staff apartments

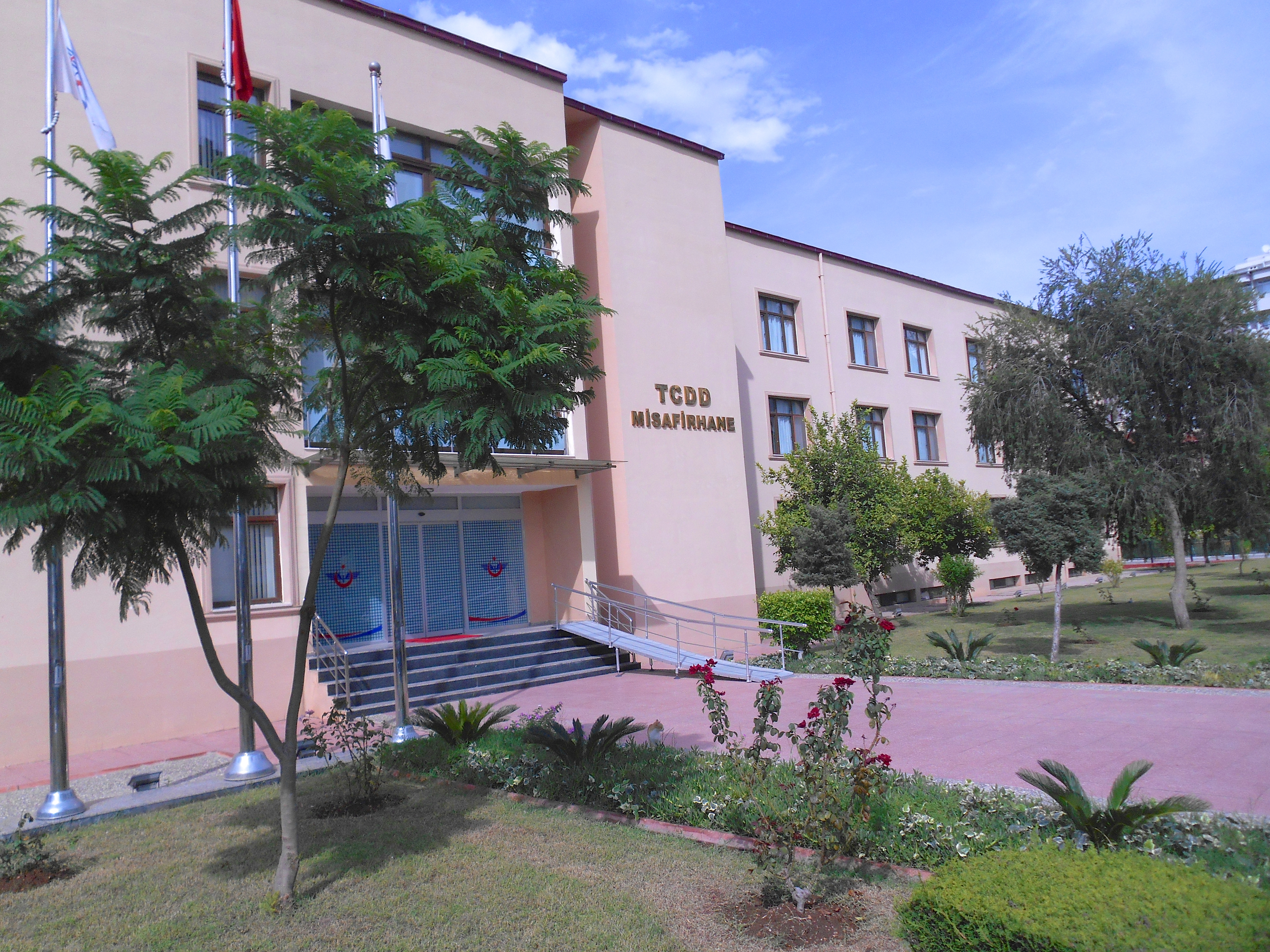
TCDD Inn
