= Mersin railway station =

Railway station in Mersin, Turkey

Coordinates: 36.8027°N 34.6337°E

MERSİN
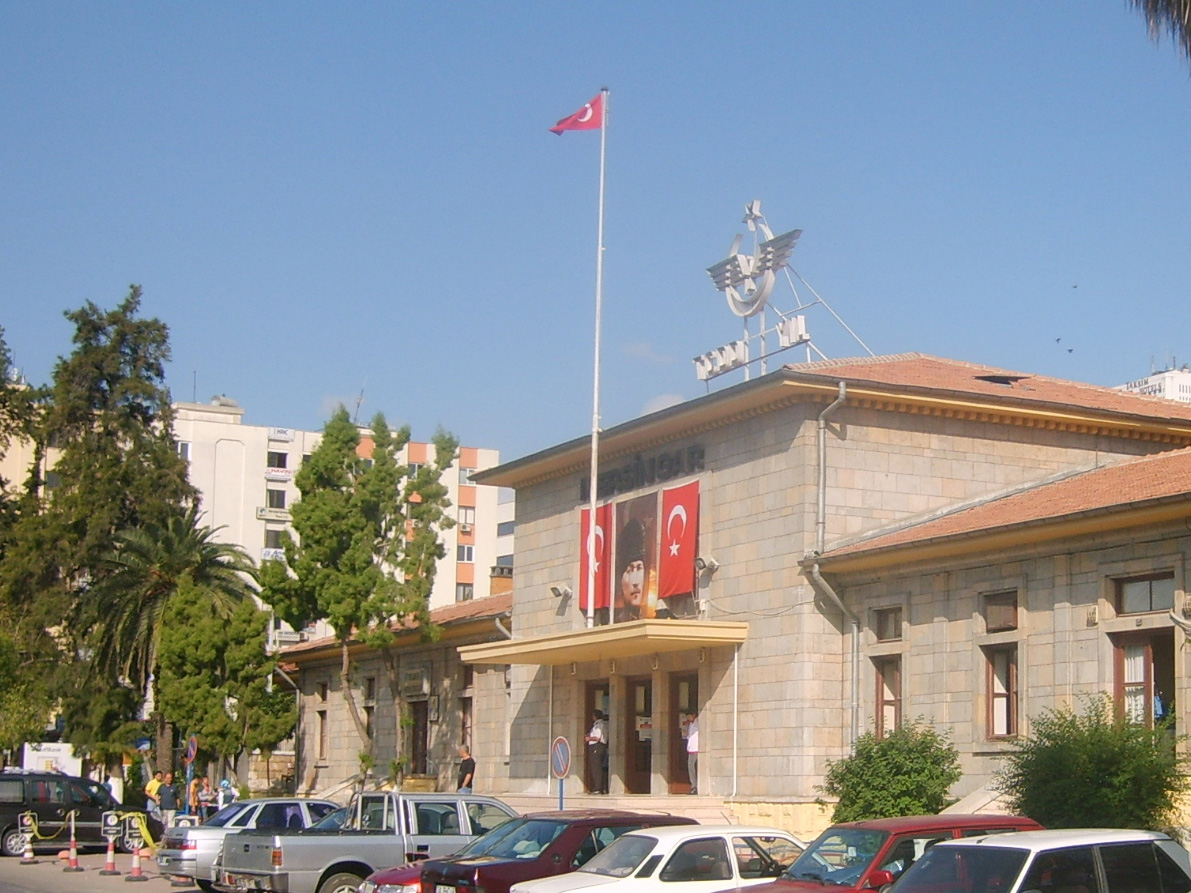
- Mersin Railway Station from the south east.

General information
- Owner: TCDD
- Platforms: 4
- Tracks: 7

History
- Opened: 1886
- Rebuilt: 1955

Services
Preceding station	TCDD Taşımacılık	Following station
Terminus	Mersin–İskenderun	Tırmıl towards İskenderun
Terminus	Mersin–İslahiye	Tırmıl towards İslahiye
Terminus	Mersin–Adana	Tırmıl towards Adana
Location
- Location within Turkey

Mersin station (Turkish: Mersin istasyonu) is the main railway terminal in the city of Mersin, Turkey. The station is located in the ilçe (district) of Akdeniz. The station is in use since 1886.

== The railway ==
The station was built in 1886 to be the western terminus of the 67 km (42 mi) long Adana–Mersin Railway Line. It became a part of the Berlin-Baghdad Railway in 1911. This increased the traffic of the station, for the Central Anatolia became the hinterland of the port. After the Republic of Turkey was proclaimed in 1923, Turkish government began the railway nationalization project. According to act no.1376 (Jan. 5, 1929) Mersin-Adana railway was also absorbed by the Chemins de Fer Ottomans d'Anatolie (Turkish: Osmanlı Anadolu Demiryolları), a subsidiary of the Turkish State Railways (TCDD).

== The station ==
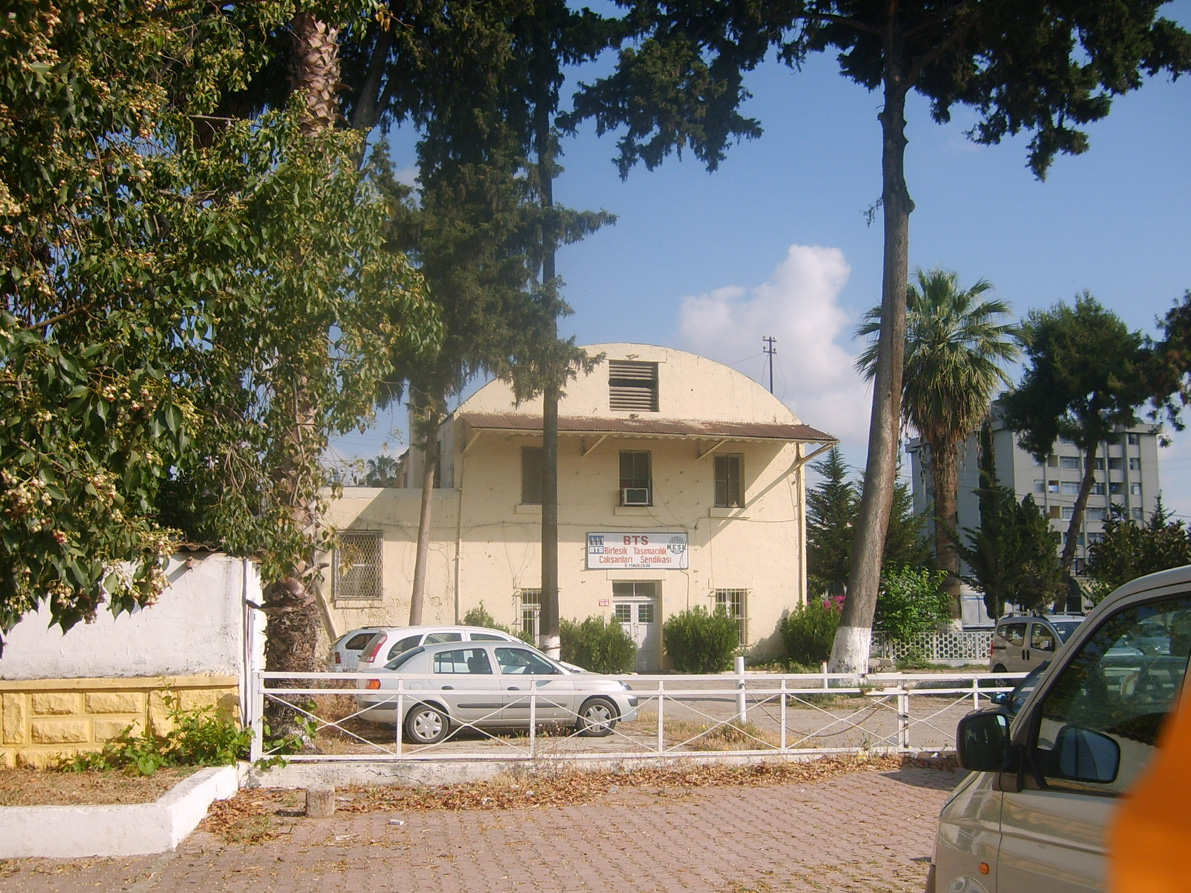
Old station

The original station building survives and is used for certain offices. But in 1955 a newer station building has been constructed within the same yard. The station is approximately 500 m (1,600 ft) from the port administration and there is a spur line to the docks.

== Trains ==
The majority of the trains using Mersin station are freight trains. The main passenger train is between Mersin and Adana, 23 times a day with 9 stops in between. Some of these trains are connection trains to main line trains, the transfer station being Yenice.
