= Adana–Mersin railway =

Railway line in Turkey

Coordinates: 37.00421°N 35.319°E

Adana-Mersin railway Adana-Mersin demiryolu
- The western terminus of the railway, Mersin.

Overview
- Status: Under reconstruction
- Owner: Turkish State Railways
- Locale: Çukurova
- Termini: Adana station, Adana; Mersin station, Mersin
- Stations: 11

Service
- Type: Heavy rail
- System: Turkish State Railways
- Operator(s): TCDD Taşımacılık; Körfez Ulaştırma; Omsan

History
- Opened: 2 August 1886

Technical
- Line length: 68.4 km (42.50 mi)
- Number of tracks: Double track (3rd and 4th tracks under construction)
- Track gauge: 1,435 mm (4 ft 8 1/2 in) standard gauge
- Electrification: 25 kV, 50 Hz AC overhead line
- Operating speed: 105 km/h (65 mph)

The Adana–Mersin railway (Turkish: Adana–Mersin demiryolu) is a 68.38 km (42.49 mi) long electrified railway in southern Turkey. Beginning at Adana, on the west bank of the Seyhan River, the railway runs west across the Çukurova plain to Mersin on the Mediterranean Sea. Despite its relatively short length, the railway is a major freight and passenger corridor within the region; primarily serving as a link to other major railways connecting Çukurova to the wider Anatolian plateau as well as the Port of Mersin.

Originally built between 1884-1886 by the Mersin-Tarsus-Adana railway company during Ottoman rule, the railway was later acquired by the Baghdad Railway (CIOB) in 1906 and integrated into their main line from Konya to Baghdad. The CIOB connected their railway from Konya to the Adana-Mersin railway at Yenice while extending the railway east from Adana to Mesopotamia. During World War I the line served an important role for the empire, transporting troops and materiel to the fronts in Mesopotamia and Palestine. Following the war and the establishment of the Republic of Turkey, the railway was nationalized and acquired by the Turkish State Railways in 1929.

To alleviate traffic on the line, a second track was added between Adana and Yenice in 1987 and then further to Mersin in 1996. The railway was eventually electrified in 2017-18, but only the eastern half from Adana to Yenice was energized. Beginning in 2023, construction works for the wider Mersin-Adana-Gaziantep higher speed railway began. This started with the reduction of passenger train service on the railway until its temporary suspension in 2024. Freight traffic continued to run between Yenice and Adana until 2025, when the entire railway was temporarily shut down for construction. A third and fourth track will be added to the line along with new and rebuilt stations, as well as increasing operating speeds to 200 km/h (120 mph). The Adana-Mersin railway is expected to re-open to train traffic in 2027.

== History ==
=== Mersin–Tarsus–Adana Railway ===
On January 20, 1883, the Ottoman Government gave a concession to develop railways in Cilicia to two Turkish men. They sold a part of their rights to a group of English and French investors, leading to the establishment of the Mersin–Tarsus–Adana Railway (MTA), a French company headquartered in London. The line was quickly built and opened on August 2, 1886.

In 1896, the Turkish men sold all their rights to the company, making the MTA fully foreign owned. In 1906, Deutsche Bank bought the line from the French company. After World War I and the Turkish Independence War, the line was still owned by the Deutsche Bank. On January 1, 1929, the line was nationalized, as were the Chemins de Fer Ottomans d'Anatolie (CFOA). It became part of the Chemins de fer d'Anatolie Baghdad Railway, which was a part of the Turkish State Railways (TCDD). TCDD operates the line to this day.

The MTA terminal station in Adana was abandoned by the Baghdad Railway which built its own station further north.
