= İskenderun railway station =

Railway station in Turkey

İSKENDERUN
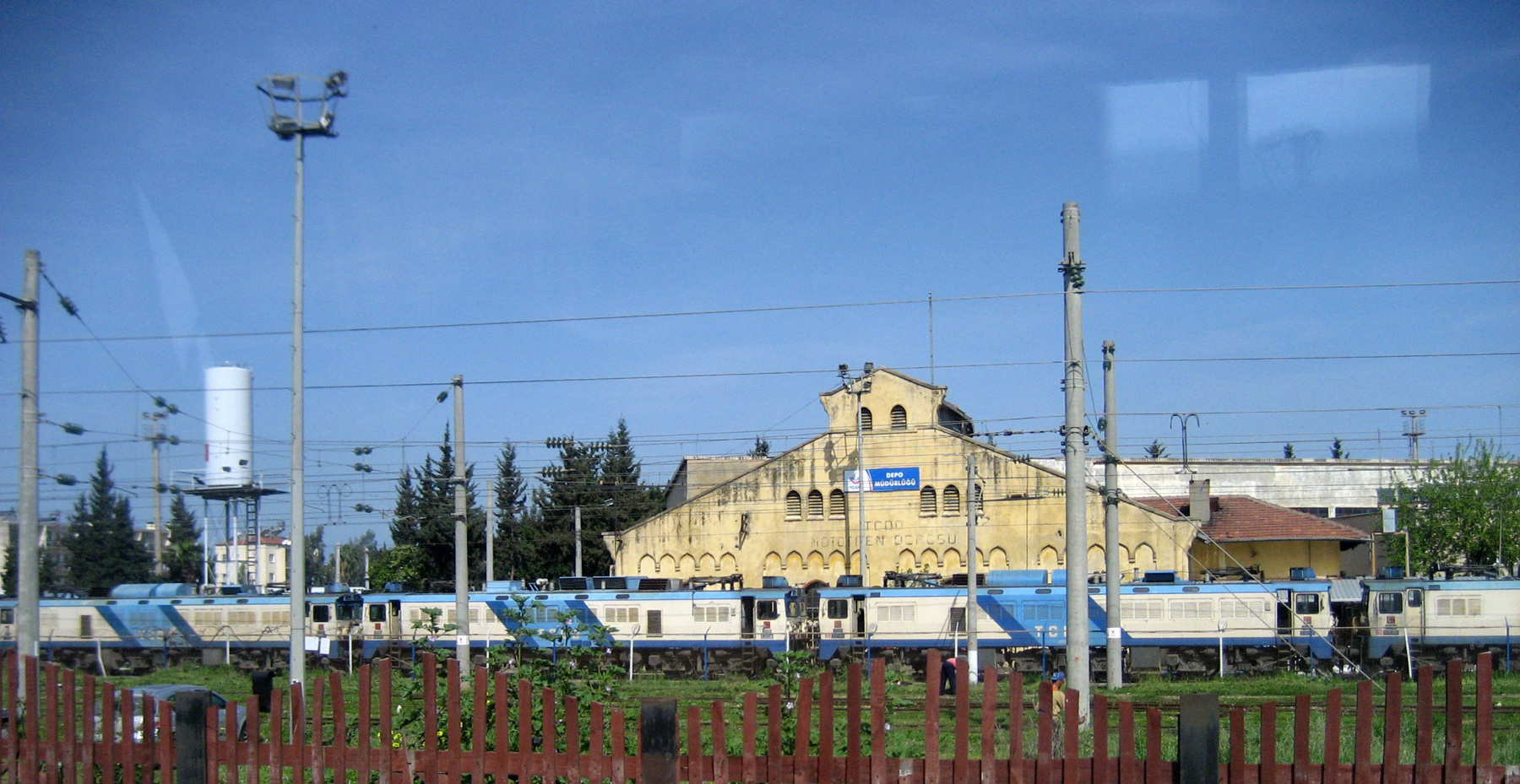
- İskenderun railway station

General information
- Location: Çay mahallesi, İskenderun
- Coordinates: 36°35′18″N 36°10′54″E
- Owner: TCDD
- Line: Mersin–İskenderun
- Platforms: 1 side platform
- Tracks: 1

Construction
- Parking: Yes

History
- Opened: 1913
- Electrified: 25 kV AC

Services
Preceding station	TCDD Taşımacılık	Following station
Sarıseki towards Mersin	Mersin–İskenderun	Terminus
Location
- Location within Turkey

İskenderun station (Turkish: İskenderun istasyonu) is the main railway station in the city of İskenderun, Turkey. The station is located at 36°35′18″N 36°10′54″E. The bus station is to the south west and the harbor is to the north of the station. İskenderun is a port city in the Hatay Province and the station is the southern terminus of the Toprakkale-İskenderun branch line which connects the province to the main line between Adana and Gaziantep. The line was opened to service in 1913 during the Ottoman Empire era.

The station briefly appears in the movie Indiana Jones and the Last Crusade.

== Trains ==
The majority of the trains using İskenderun station are freight trains. The main passenger train is between Mersin and İskenderun with 21 stops in between. some of the important stops are; Dörtyol, Ceyhan, Adana and Tarsus.
