= İslahiye railway station =

Railway station in İslahiye, Turkey, situated on the former Baghdad Railway

İSLAHİYE

General information
- Location: Santral Cad, İslahiye, Gaziantep
- Coordinates: 37°01′50″N 36°38′11″E
- System: TCDD regional rail station
- Owner: Turkish State Railways
- Line: Mersin-İslahiye Regional
- Platforms: 2
- Tracks: 2

Construction
- Structure type: At-grade

History
- Opened: 1912

Services
Preceding station	TCDD Taşımacılık	Following station
Türkbahçe towards Mersin	Mersin–İslahiye	Terminus
Location

İslahiye station (Turkish: İslahiye garı) is a train station in İslahiye, Turkey. Situated on the former Baghdad Railway, it is the last station before the border with Syria. Before the outbreak of the Syrian Civil War, trains to Aleppo also used the station but have since been suspended. İslahiye station was built in 1912 by the Baghdad Railway.
