= IWBF =

IWBF is an abbreviation for:

- International Wheelchair Basketball Federation, governing body for wheelchair basketball
- International Women's Boxing Federation, a sanctioning body for women's professional boxing, one of several including the WIBA, WIBF.
