= Handball at the 2013 Mediterranean Games – Women's tournament =

Women's handball at the 2013 Mediterranean Games
Tournament details
- Host country: Turkey
- Venue: 1 (in 1 host city)
- Dates: 23–30 June
- Teams: 10 (from 2 confederations)

Final positions
- Champions: Serbia (3rd title)
- Runners-up: Slovenia
- Third place: Croatia
- Fourth place: Montenegro

The women's tournament of handball at the 2013 Mediterranean Games were held from 23 to 30 June 2013 at the Yüreğir Serinevler Arena in Adana, Turkey.

== Format ==
- Ten teams are divided into two preliminary groups. Each group have five teams.
- The top 2 teams from each group will qualify for Semifinals, other teams will qualify for the placement matches.
- Winners of the Semifinals contested the gold medal game and the losers the bronze medal game.

== Participating teams ==
- Algeria
- Croatia
- Italy
- Macedonia
- Montenegro
- Serbia
- Slovenia
- Spain
- Tunisia
- Turkey

== Group stage ==
=== Group A ===
Team	Pld	W	D	L	GF	GA	GD	Pts
Serbia	4	4	0	0	111	86	+25	8
Montenegro	4	2	0	2	81	88	−7	4
Turkey	4	2	0	2	96	98	−2	4
Algeria	4	1	0	3	89	95	−6	2
Italy	4	1	0	3	94	104	−10	2

Matches

22 June 2013; 11:00	Serbia	38-27	Italy	Yüreğir Serinevler Arena, Adana
22 June 2013; 11:00		(21-10)		Yüreğir Serinevler Arena, Adana

22 June 2013; 17:00	Algeria	23–25	Turkey	Yüreğir Serinevler Arena, Adana; Referees: Carlos Javier Gude, Juan Jose Gude (ESP)
22 June 2013; 17:00	Ait Ahmed 5	(14-12)	Şahin 7	Yüreğir Serinevler Arena, Adana; Referees: Carlos Javier Gude, Juan Jose Gude (ESP)

23 June 2013; 15:30	Turkey	22–25	Montenegro	Yüreğir Serinevler Arena, Adana; Referees: Mansour Al Suwaidi, Saleh Bamutref (QAT)
23 June 2013; 15:30	B. Yılmaz 8	(10–10)	Mehmedovic 10	Yüreğir Serinevler Arena, Adana; Referees: Mansour Al Suwaidi, Saleh Bamutref (QAT)

23 June 2013; 17:30	Serbia	28-20	Algeria	Yüreğir Serinevler Arena, Adana
23 June 2013; 17:30		(18-8)		Yüreğir Serinevler Arena, Adana

24 June 2013; 11:00	Montenegro	18-21	Serbia	Yüreğir Serinevler Arena, Adana
24 June 2013; 11:00		(13-11)		Yüreğir Serinevler Arena, Adana

24 June 2013; 13:00	Algeria	19-23	Italy	Yüreğir Serinevler Arena, Adana
24 June 2013; 13:00		(11-13)		Yüreğir Serinevler Arena, Adana

25 June 2013; 14:00	Serbia	24–21	Turkey	Yüreğir Serinevler Arena, Adana; Referees: Andrei Gousko, Siharhei Repkin
25 June 2013; 14:00	Atanaskovic 6	(11–7)	İskenderoğlu, B. Yılmaz 4	Yüreğir Serinevler Arena, Adana; Referees: Andrei Gousko, Siharhei Repkin

25 June 2013; 16:00	Montenegro	19-18	Italy	Yüreğir Serinevler Arena, Adana
25 June 2013; 16:00		(13-13)		Yüreğir Serinevler Arena, Adana

26 June 2013; 11:00	Montenegro	19-27	Algeria	Yüreğir Serinevler Arena, Adana
26 June 2013; 11:00		(11-11)		Yüreğir Serinevler Arena, Adana

26 June 2013; 13:00	Turkey	28–26	Italy	Yüreğir Serinevler Arena, Adana; Referees: Amer Konjicanin, Dino Konjicanin (BIH)
26 June 2013; 13:00	İskit, Şahin 6	(11–14)	Gheorghe 8	Yüreğir Serinevler Arena, Adana; Referees: Amer Konjicanin, Dino Konjicanin (BIH)

=== Group B ===
Team	Pld	W	D	L	GF	GA	GD	Pts
Slovenia	4	3	1	0	118	98	+20	7
Croatia	4	2	1	1	108	116	−8	5
Spain	4	2	0	2	93	80	+13	4
Tunisia	4	2	0	2	117	108	+9	4
North Macedonia	4	0	0	4	82	116	−34	0

22 June 2013; 13:00	Croatia	29-26	North Macedonia	Yüreğir Serinevler Arena, Adana
22 June 2013; 13:00		(16-15)		Yüreğir Serinevler Arena, Adana

22 June 2013; 15:00	Slovenia	35-29	Tunisia	Yüreğir Serinevler Arena, Adana
22 June 2013; 15:00		(17-12)		Yüreğir Serinevler Arena, Adana

23 June 2013; 11:30	North Macedonia	21-32	Slovenia	Yüreğir Serinevler Arena, Adana
23 June 2013; 11:30		(10-12)		Yüreğir Serinevler Arena, Adana

23 June 2013; 13:30	Spain	24-25	Croatia	Yüreğir Serinevler Arena, Adana
23 June 2013; 13:30		(11-11)		Yüreğir Serinevler Arena, Adana

24 June 2013; 15:00	Spain	17-20	Slovenia	Yüreğir Serinevler Arena, Adana
24 June 2013; 15:00		(9-12)		Yüreğir Serinevler Arena, Adana

24 June 2013; 17:00	North Macedonia	22-31	Tunisia	Yüreğir Serinevler Arena, Adana
24 June 2013; 17:00		(8-17)		Yüreğir Serinevler Arena, Adana

25 June 2013; 10:00	Spain	28-22	Tunisia	Yüreğir Serinevler Arena, Adana
25 June 2013; 10:00		(12-11)		Yüreğir Serinevler Arena, Adana

25 June 2013; 12:00	Croatia	31-31	Slovenia	Yüreğir Serinevler Arena, Adana
25 June 2013; 12:00		(14-14)		Yüreğir Serinevler Arena, Adana

26 June 2013; 15:00	Croatia	35-23	Tunisia	Yüreğir Serinevler Arena, Adana
26 June 2013; 15:00		(19-12)		Yüreğir Serinevler Arena, Adana

26 June 2013; 17:00	Spain	24-13	North Macedonia	Yüreğir Serinevler Arena, Adana
26 June 2013; 17:00		(9-9)		Yüreğir Serinevler Arena, Adana

== Playoffs ==
=== Semifinals ===
Semi-finals
28 June 2013 17:00
Serbia	25
Croatia	16
28 June 2013 15:00
Slovenia	24
Montenegro	22

Final
29 June 2013 18:00
Serbia	25
Slovenia	19
Third place
29 June 2013 16:00
Croatia	25
Montenegro	24

28 June 2013; 17:00	Serbia	25-16	Croatia	Yüreğir Serinevler Arena, Adana
28 June 2013; 17:00		(13-7)		Yüreğir Serinevler Arena, Adana

28 June 2013; 15:00	Slovenia	24-22	Montenegro	Yüreğir Serinevler Arena, Adana
28 June 2013; 15:00		(10-11)		Yüreğir Serinevler Arena, Adana

=== 9th/10th classification ===
28 June 2013; 09:00	Algeria	24-27	North Macedonia	Yüreğir Serinevler Arena, Adana
28 June 2013; 09:00		(11-12)		Yüreğir Serinevler Arena, Adana

=== 7th/8th classification ===
28 June 2013; 11:00	Tunisia	26-24	Italy	Yüreğir Serinevler Arena, Adana
28 June 2013; 11:00		(10-14)		Yüreğir Serinevler Arena, Adana

=== 5th/6th classification ===
28 June 2013; 13:00	Spain	29 – 23	Turkey	Yüreğir Serinevler Arena, Adana

=== Bronze medal match ===
29 June 2013; 18:00	Croatia	25-24	Montenegro	Yüreğir Serinevler Arena, Adana
29 June 2013; 18:00		(13-12)		Yüreğir Serinevler Arena, Adana

=== Final ===
29 June 2013; 16:00	Serbia	25-19	Slovenia	Yüreğir Serinevler Arena, Adana
29 June 2013; 16:00		(12-11)		Yüreğir Serinevler Arena, Adana
