= History of netball =

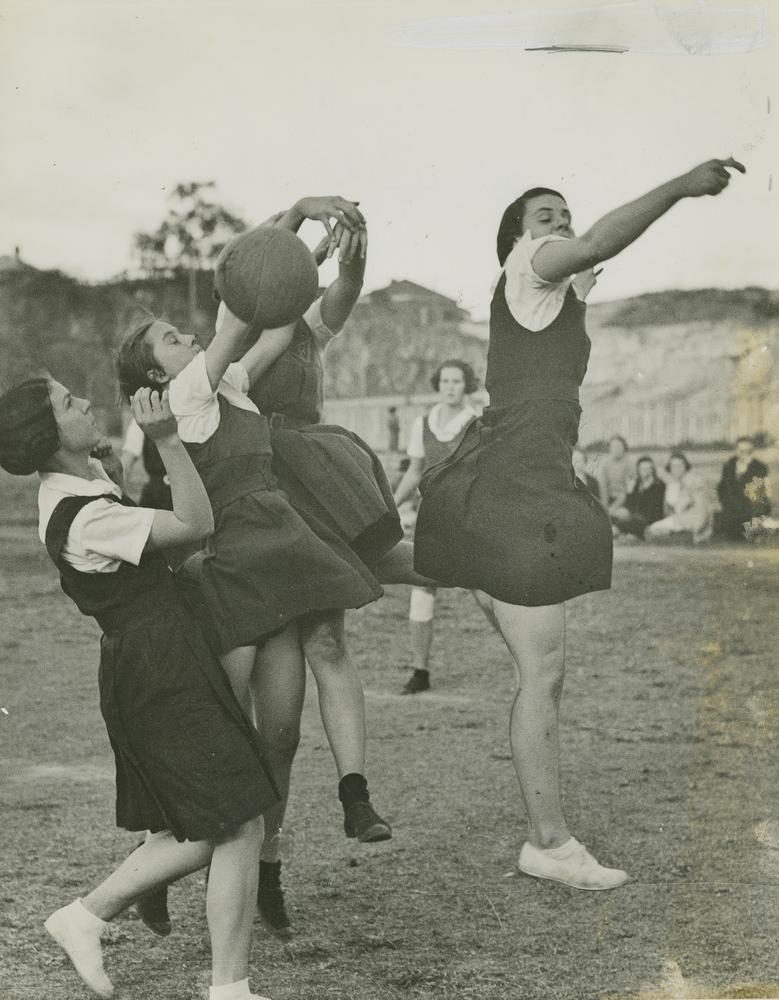
Early netball game in Queensland, Australia. The players are wearing gymslips, which were common attire for netballers throughout much of the early 20th century.

The history of netball can be traced to the early development of basketball. A year after basketball was invented in 1891, the sport was modified for women to accommodate social conventions regarding their participation in sport, giving rise to women's basketball. Variations of women's basketball arose across the United States and in England. At the Madame Österberg Physical Training College Dartford, England, the rules of women's basketball were modified over several years to form an entirely new sport: "net ball". The sport was invented to encourage young females to be physically active and energetic. The first codified rules of netball were published at the start of the twentieth century, and from there the new sport spread throughout the British Empire.

From the beginning, netball was widely accepted as a sport suitable for women. Domestic netball competitions arose in several countries during the first half of the 20th century. Starting from the 1920s, national associations were formed to organise the sport in netball-playing nations. International matches were played sporadically in the early 20th century, but were hampered by varying rules in different countries.

By 1960, the rules of netball were standardized internationally and an international governing body was formed to oversee the sport globally. Initially called the International Netball Federation (INF), the organization was later renamed World Netball. The second half of the 20th century saw international competition expand, with the sport's premier international competition, the INF Netball World Cup, starting in 1963. Netball has also been contested at the Commonwealth Games since 1998.

Today, netball is popular in Commonwealth nations, and also in the Republic of Ireland, and is reportedly played by over 20 million people worldwide. It remains primarily a women's sport. Further developments to the sport are being trialed, including a shortened version of the game played in a World Series format; netball groups are also seeking inclusion in the Olympic Games.

== Origins from basketball ==
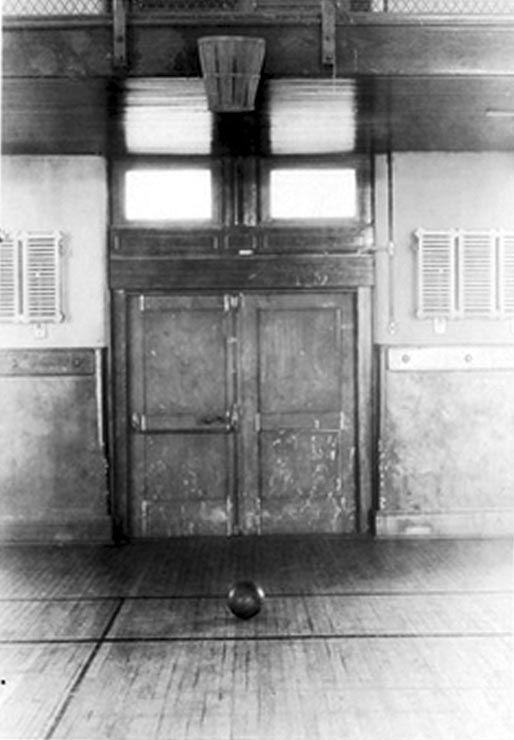
Naismith's original "basket ball" court in Springfield, Massachusetts

Netball traces its roots to basketball. Basketball was invented in 1891 by James Naismith, a Canadian physical education instructor working in the United States, who was trying to develop an indoor sport for his students at the YMCA Training School (now Springfield College) in Springfield, Massachusetts. His game was first played in the campus gymnasium on a court roughly half the size of a regulation NBA court today, between two teams of nine players. It was played with a soccer ball that was shot into closed-bottom peach baskets that were nailed to the gymnasium wall.

Women teachers became interested in Naismith's game soon afterwards. Senda Berenson, a physical education instructor at nearby Smith College, read an article on Naismith's game, and in 1892 adapted his game for her female students. Berenson devised rules that maintained feminine decorum and slowed down potentially "strenuous" play. She divided the playing court into thirds, each containing three players per team that could not leave their assigned zone. Players also could not hold the ball for more than three seconds, dribble it more than three times, or snatch the ball from another player. The first game of women's basketball was played in 1892 at Smith College. By 1895, women's basketball had spread across the United States, with variations of the rules emerging in different areas.

Published rules for women's basketball first appeared in 1895, written by Clara Gregory Baer, who was working as a physical education instructor at Sophie Newcomb College in New Orleans during the 1890s. Baer introduced women's basketball to her female students at Sophie Newcomb College as early as 1893. According to the International Netball Federation, Baer received a copy of the basketball rules from Naismith, but she misinterpreted his unclear drawings marking the zones that players could best control, believing that they were restrictions on player movement. Naismith noted that Baer's game was substantially different from his version and recommended that she give her sport a different name. In 1895, Baer published the rules of her game under the name "basquette"; these were the first published rules for women's basketball. The rules of this game were substantially different from Berenson's, although similarly adapted for women's participation. Each player was assigned a zone on court to which they were confined, and so a game with seven players per team was played on a court with seven zones. She also forbade dribbling of the ball and guarding, introduced alternating offensive/defensive roles after each goal was scored, and developed rules to maintain elegant posture among players.

Eventually, the first unified rules of women's basketball were published in the Spalding Athletic Library Rules for Women's Basket Ball in 1901, with Berenson as editor and with some rules adopted from Baer's game. Starting from 1918, the rules of women's basketball were gradually rewritten to more closely resemble men's basketball, and today basketball is played under the same rules by men and women. However, a different sport emerged when basketball arrived in England.

== "Net ball" in the British Empire ==
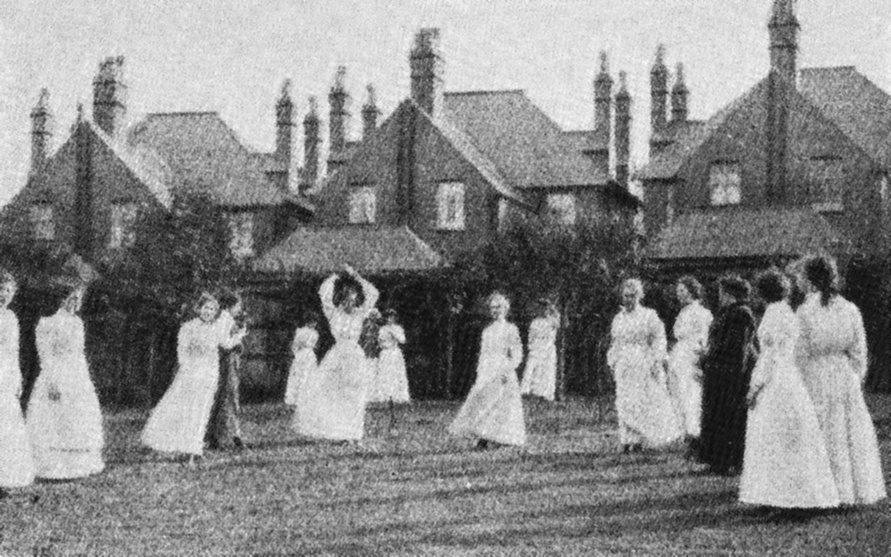
English women playing netball in 1910

Basketball was first introduced to England in 1892 through the Young Men's Christian Association (YMCA) at Birkenhead in Merseyside, although the sport did not gain significant popularity in that country for another two decades. Basketball was also taught at other institutions in England, either by visiting American instructors or by English people returning from visits to North America.

In 1893, Martina Bergman-Österberg informally introduced one version of basketball to her female physical training students at the Hampstead Physical Training College in London, after having seen the game being played in the United States. Madame Österberg advocated physical fitness for women to better prepare them for motherhood and in the wider context of women's emancipation. Basketball was more formally introduced to Madame Österberg's college by an American lecturer, Dr Toles (alternatively spelled "Toll"), in 1895. This version of the game was played with waste paper baskets for goals that were hung on walls; there were also no lines, boundaries, or circles as in the modern game.

The rules of this game were modified at Madame Österberg's college (which moved to Dartford, Kent in 1895) over several years. Substantial revisions were made during a visit in 1897 from another American teacher, Miss Porter, who introduced rules from women's basketball in the United States; the game also moved outdoors onto grass courts, the playing court was divided into three zones, and the baskets were replaced with rings that had nets. By this time, the new sport had also acquired a new name: "net ball". The first codified rules of netball were published in 1900 or 1901 by the Ling Association (later the Physical Education Association), with 250 copies of the rules published. From England, the game of netball was spread to all corners of the British Empire.

In some countries, the sport still retained the name "women's (outdoor) basketball" upon its arrival. "Women's basketball" arrived in Australia reportedly as early as 1897, although most sources agree that it was established in that country around the start of the 20th century. "Women's basketball" arrived in New Zealand in 1906 or 1907 from Australia. By 1909, "netball" was also being played in schools in Jamaica. Netball spread throughout much of the British Empire during the first half of the 20th century.

== Development in the early 20th century ==
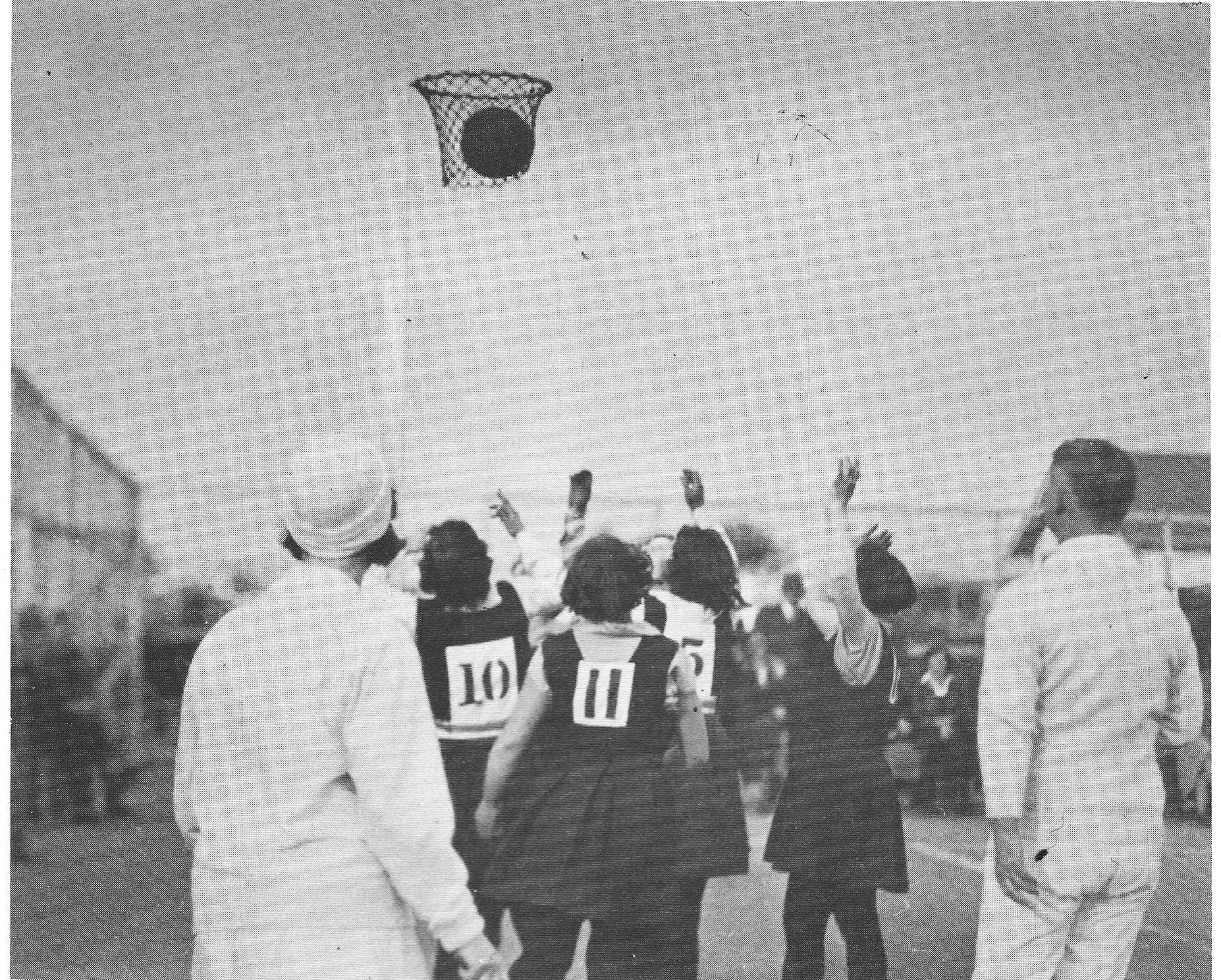
School netball game in New Zealand, ca. 1920

From the start, netball was developed as a women's sport: existing outside the sphere of male-dominated sports, netball did not encounter the initial social opposition that faced women in other sports in the early 20th century. Women's participation in netball in the early 20th century was widely accepted, as the sport avoided physical contact and did not involve male participation. The sport spread substantially through the school systems of many netball-playing countries.

National netball associations were established, starting from the 1920s, to administer various organised netball leagues and organisations on a national level. The first such organisation was the New Zealand Basketball Association, which was formed in 1924. Equivalent organisations were formed in other countries, including the All England Net Ball Association in 1926, the All Australia Women's Basketball Association in 1927, and the Jamaican Netball Association in 1957. In 1949, wheelchair netball was introduced at the Grand Festival of Paraplegic Sport and was played at every festival until 1954.

Competitive netball in the early 20th century mostly comprised local leagues or nationwide domestic tournaments. International competition was initially hindered by variations of rules in different countries. Australia and New Zealand contested the first international game of netball (still called "women's basketball" in both countries) in 1938, when the New Zealand team toured Australia, playing local and state teams as well as the Australian national team. At the time, Australia played seven-a-side netball, while New Zealand played nine-a-side. For these matches, Australian seven-a-side netball was adopted, along with some netball rules from England. In their one encounter for that tour, Australia's national team defeated New Zealand 40–11. England played Scotland and Wales for the first time in the 1949 England Scotland Wales Netball Series, with England winning 25–3 in both games.

== Standardisation and the global game ==
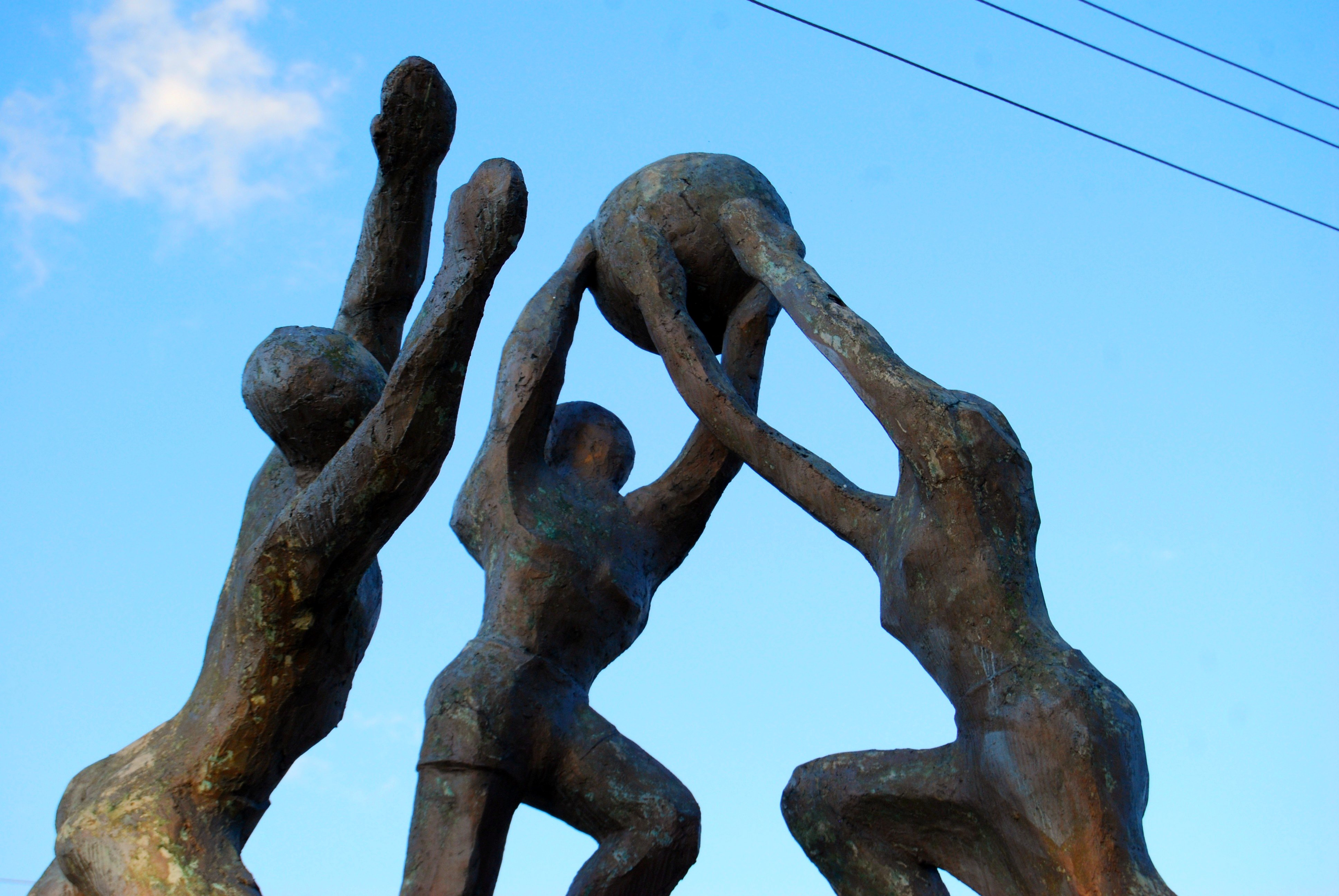
Netball sculpture in Trinidad and Tobago outside the National Stadium, used for the 1979 World Netball Tournament

Following the 1956 Australian tour of England, the first efforts were made in earnest to establish unifying international rules for netball. These efforts culminated in 1960 with representatives from key netball-playing countries – including England, Australia, New Zealand, South Africa, Ceylon, as well as the British West Indies – agreeing on a regularised set of rules, with seven-a-side teams; an international body was also formed to govern the sport globally, called the International Federation of Women's Basketball and Netball (now the International Netball Federation). The sport was referred to as "netball" in most countries, although New Zealand and Australia still used the name "women's basketball"; both countries eventually adopted the name "netball" in 1970.

This meeting also resulted in the creation of a world tournament to be played every four years, now called the Netball World Cup. The inaugural tournament was played in Eastbourne, England in 1963, and tournaments have since been played quadrennially. Since their inception, Australia has dominated the World Championships, winning 12 of the 16 tournaments played. The most recent tournament was the 2023 Netball World Cup in Cape Town, with Australia emerging as winners. The next tournament is scheduled for 2027 in Sydney.

== Expanding international competition ==
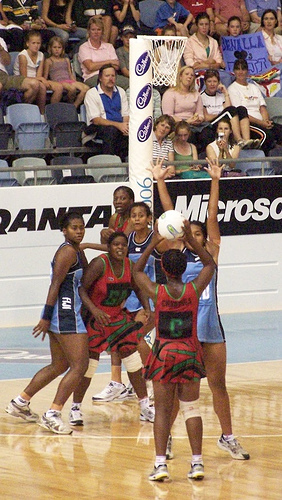
Malawi and Fiji at the 2006 Commonwealth Games

Following the global standardisation of netball rules, international netball competition expanded during the second half of the 20th century. It was included for the first time in 1985 at the World Games, a sporting competition held every four years for sports that are not contested at the Olympic Games. Netball has not been included in the World Games since.

During the 1988 Australian Bicentenary celebrations, a youth netball tournament was organised in Canberra involving U-21 teams from around the world on 15–24 July. This tournament proved to be a success, and has continued to be held roughly every four years, presently as the World Youth Netball Championships. Fiji hosted the next tournament in 1992, followed by Canada in 1996, Wales in 2000 and the United States in 2005. The most recent tournament was held in the Cook Islands in 2009, with Australia U21 emerging as champions.

At the 1990 Commonwealth Games in Auckland, netball was included in the programme as a demonstration sport. Netball became a competitive sport in the Commonwealth Games at the 1998 Games in Kuala Lumpur. Australia won the inaugural netball competition in 1998, and again at the 2002 Games in Manchester. New Zealand won the next two netball competitions at the 2006 Games in Melbourne and the 2010 Games in Delhi. Netball has since become a "core sport" at the Commonwealth Games (for women only).

Netball has never been contested at the Olympic Games, nor has it been shown as a demonstration sport. However, World Netball became an Olympic "recognised sport federation" in 1995, paving the way for its possible inclusion as a competitive sport in the future. A campaign in England was started in 2008 for netball to be included as a demonstration sport at the 2012 Summer Olympics in London, which was supported by British Prime Minister Gordon Brown.

Smaller regional tournaments emerged in the 1990s and early 2000s giving increased competition for second-tier nations, including the Asian Netball Championship and the Nations Cup. Netball has also been included in various smaller multi-sport events, including the Pacific Games, All-Africa Games, World Masters Games and the Arafura Games.

Increased international competition led to the development of the INF World Rankings in 2008, in which the performances of national teams could be compared. Higher-ranked national teams often compete on an annual basis, either in one-off tests or as part of tours. The Australian and New Zealand national teams have traditionally dominated the international game, although England and Jamaica are becoming increasingly competitive against their Antipodean counterparts.

== Elite domestic competitions ==
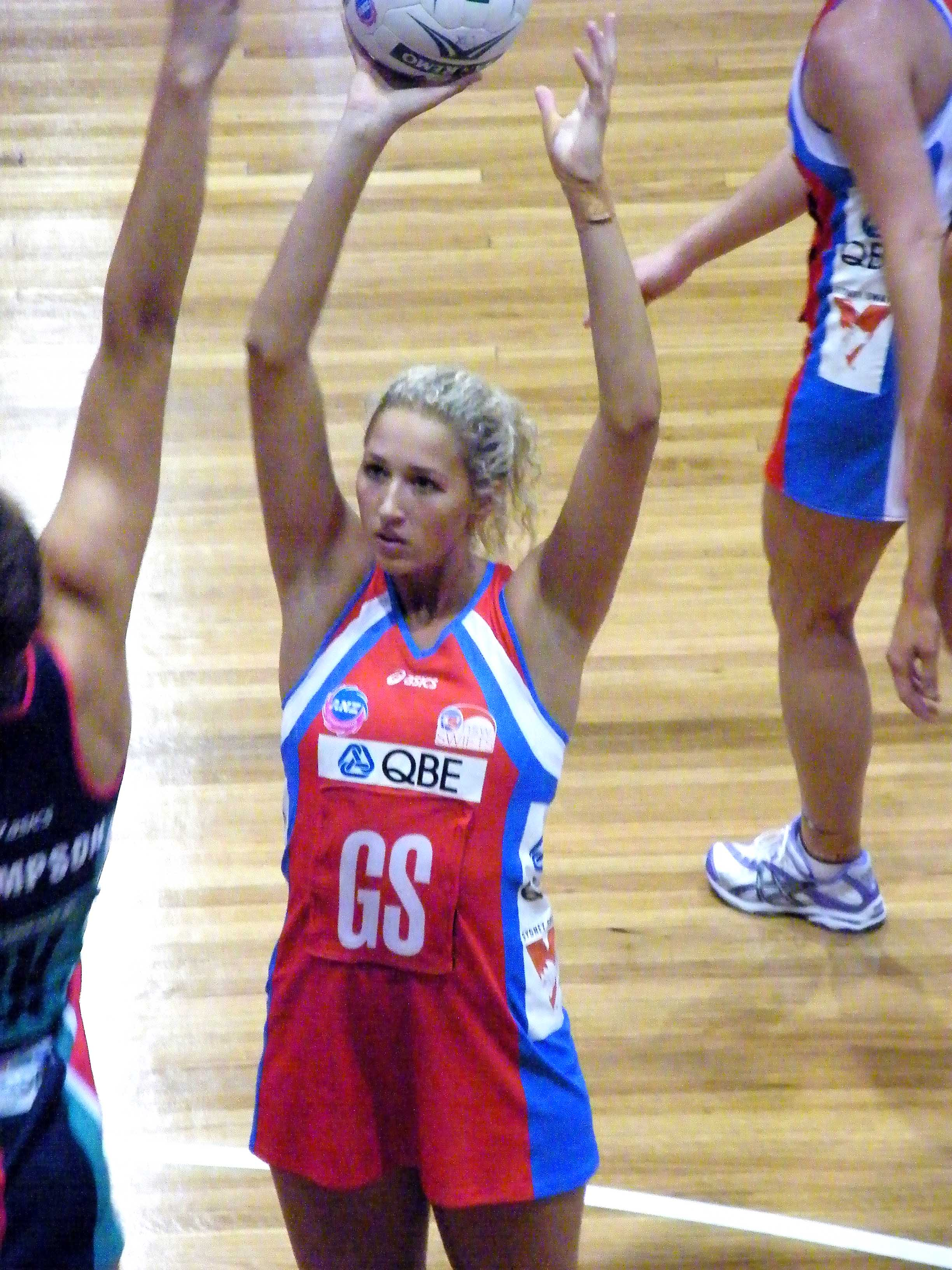
ANZ Championship pre-season game in Sydney, March 2009

Nationwide netball competitions emerged in different countries in the first half of the twentieth century, starting from the 1920s. These were primarily contested between local-level clubs or regions/states. Elite domestic competitions did not emerge until the late twentieth century. These competitions have usually involved franchises rather than club or representative teams, and have focused on gaining a larger profile for the sport, as well as attracting greater sponsorship, investment and media coverage.

The Commonwealth Bank Trophy (CBT) was the first elite domestic competition in Australia, starting in 1997. It succeeded the Mobil League, which was still a state-representative club-based competition. The Commonwealth Bank Trophy was televised on ABC Sport, although coverage was usually limited to a few live games and a weekly highlights series. The competition lasted for eleven years, playing its final season in 2007, after which it was replaced by the ANZ Championship.

New Zealand introduced its first elite domestic competition in 1998, when the previous Coca-Cola Cup, a nationwide domestic competition contested between regional-representative teams, was reorganised into a franchise-based competition, with each franchise incorporating one or more New Zealand regions. After four years, the competition became known as the National Bank Cup (NBC). Unlike its counterpart in Australia, the National Bank Cup received wide media coverage in New Zealand. During this time, netball achieved a higher profile in New Zealand than in Australia. The NBC played its last season in 2007, after which it was replaced by the ANZ Championship.

Britain introduced the Netball Superleague in 2005. It replaced the previous Super Cup, which started in England in 2001, and was established to improve performances on the domestic and international stages. The Superleague started with eight teams, seven from England and one from Wales; a Scottish team was added for the 2008–09 season. Sky Sports began televising the competition in 2006, attracting an overall netball viewing audience of 2.5 million people after its first year, and coinciding with a 6% increase in netball participation at grassroots level in England.

The Commonwealth Bank Trophy in Australia and the National Bank Cup in New Zealand played their last seasons in 2007. Netball Australia and Netball New Zealand convened to replace them with a joint domestic competition to start in 2008, contested between domestic franchises from both nations: the competition became known as the ANZ Championship. For the first time, all matches were telecast live in both countries. Player salaries were increased to a point where the sport is now semi-professional in both countries, with the expectation that the sport will eventually become fully professional.

== Present status and future ==
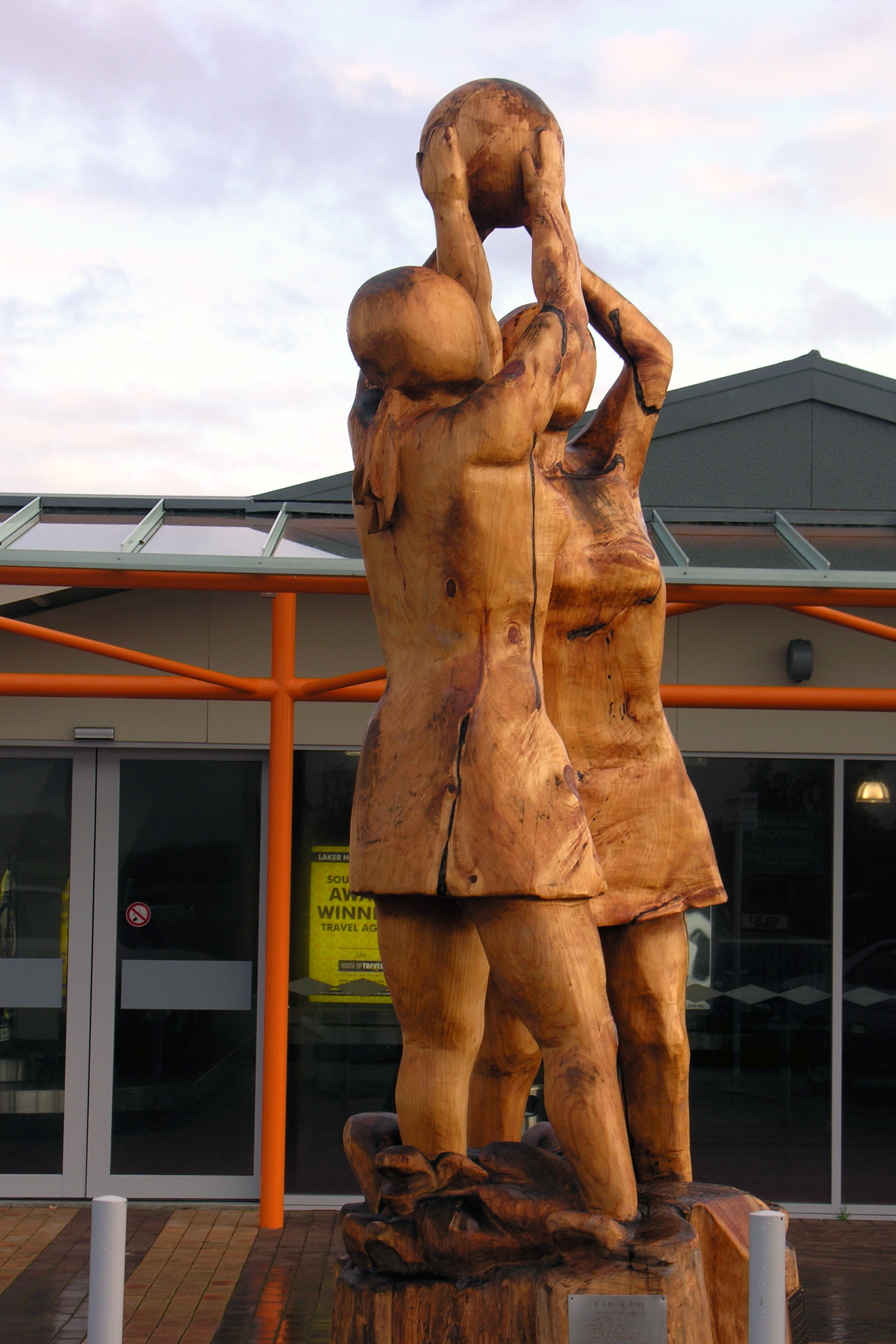
Netball sculpture in New Zealand

The INF reports that over 20 million people currently play netball in more than 80 countries, with 74 national netball associations affiliated with the worldwide governing body. It is the most popular team sport for women in Australia and New Zealand, and remains a popular women's sport throughout the Commonwealth of Nations, including in the United Kingdom, South Africa and Jamaica. Television coverage has increased the profile of the sport in countries with elite domestic competitions, but in many cases not to the extent of well-established male-dominated sports. Netball has also yet to reach the status of a fully professional sport in any country.

Further developments to the sport are being trialled. A new shortened version of the sport was announced by the INF in December 2008, which was called "fastnet" (now "Fast5"). Featuring six-minute playing quarters, long-distance shots worth multiple points, and "power plays" in which goals count for double points, the new version of the sport has been likened to cricket's Twenty20 as well as Rugby sevens. The format is primarily used in the World Netball Series, which was first contested in October 2009 and is held annually. This new competition has been contested between the top six netballing nations, according to the INF World Rankings.

== See also ==
- History of basketball
- Martinia Bergman Österberg
