= Maureen Orchard =

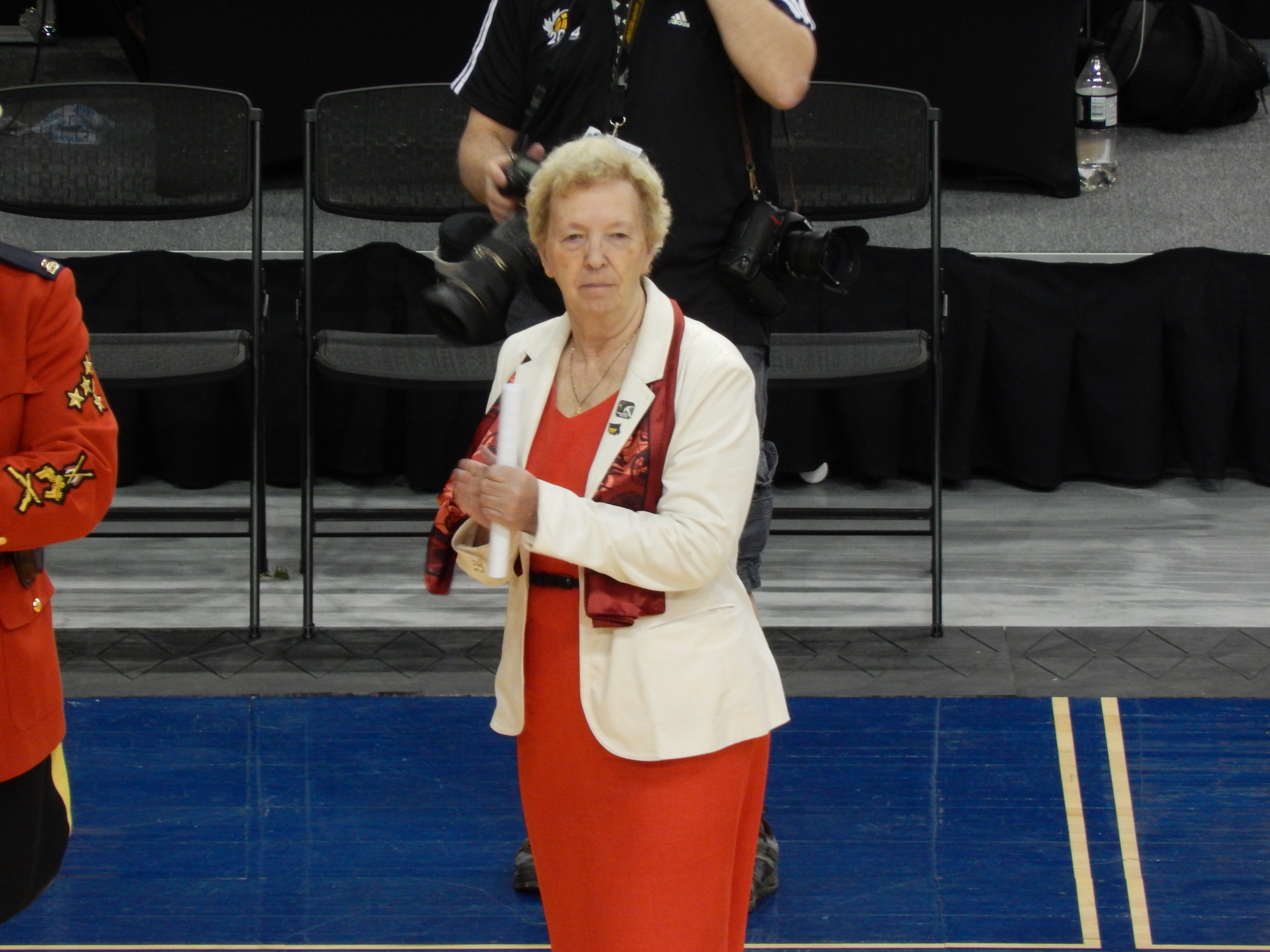
- At the 2014 Women's World Wheelchair Basketball Championship in Toronto

Secretary General of the International Wheelchair Basketball Federation

Personal details
- Born: Winnipeg
- Spouse: Jim Orchard (d. 2008)
- Children: 2
- Occupation: Sports administrator
- Awards: Queen Elizabeth II Diamond Jubilee Medal

Maureen Orchard was the president of the International Wheelchair Basketball Federation from 2002 to 2014, and its secretary general from 2014 to 2018.

== Biography ==
Maureen Orchard began playing basketball in the early 1960s. She was a coach from 1963 to 1975, and a referee from 1965 until 1980. She was elected a member of the Basketball Manitoba's board of directors in 1963, and was its president from 1973 to 1981, and its treasurer for 24 years. Elected to the board of directors of Basketball Canada in 1975, she served as director of the Canadian national teams from 1977 to 1981. In addition, she was a member of the board of the Manitoba Sports Federation for fourteen years and the Manitoba Games Council for three years. During the 1999 Pan American Games in Winnipeg, Manitoba, she was director of basketball. She was inducted into the Manitoba Basketball Hall of Fame in the builder category in 2015.

Orchard became involved in wheelchair sports in 1985, when she became the treasurer of the Canadian Wheelchair Sports Association (CWSA). As such, she was involved in the creation of the Canadian Wheelchair Basketball Association (CWBA) in 1993, serving as its president from 1993 to 1998. She was inducted into the CWBA Hall of Fame as a builder in 1998. In 2002, she was elected president of the International Wheelchair Basketball Federation (IWBF), a position she held for twelve years.

Under her leadership, the IWBF developed a new player classification and identity card system. She strengthened the system of international zones, with teams earning slots for their zone at the Wheelchair Basketball World Championship and Paralympic Games. She also established age-specific world championships. The first IWBF U23 World Wheelchair Basketball Championship for men was hosted in Toronto, Ontario, in 1997, followed by the 2011 Women's U25 Wheelchair Basketball World Championship in St Catharines, Ontario, in 2011. She was as a Technical Delegate at three Paralympic Games, and was awarded the Queen Elizabeth II Diamond Jubilee Medal in 2012. After stepping down as president of the IWBF in 2014, she remained a member of its executive council as its secretary general. She was inducted into the Canadian Paralympic Committee Hall of Fame as a builder on 7 April 2017. She retired as secretary general in September 2018, and accepted the title of honorary secretary general.
