= Africa Wheelchair Basketball Championship =

IWBF Africa Championship
- Sport: Wheelchair basketball
- Founded: 1999
- First season: 1999 (men); 2015 (women)
- Continent: IWBF Africa (Africa)

The IWBF Africa Wheelchair Basketball Championship is an international wheelchair basketball competition contested by the men's and the women's national teams of the members of the International Wheelchair Basketball Federation (IWBF), the sport's global governing body.

== Note ==
Before 2007 Africa and West Asian (AFWZ) in one zone and East Asia with Oceania (EOZ) in one zone.
Since 2007, Africa (AZ) in one zone.

== Results ==
=== Men ===
==== Africa-West Asian Wheelchair Basketball Championship ====
#	Year	Host	Gold medal game			Bronze medal game		
#	Year	Host	Gold	Score	Silver	Bronze	Score	Fourth place
1	1999; Details		South Africa	–			–	
2	2001; Details		South Africa	–			–	
3	2003; Details	(South Africa) Johannesburg	Iran	^{n/a}	South Africa	Algeria	^{n/a}	Jordan

==== Africa Wheelchair Basketball Championship ====
#	Year	Host	Gold medal game			Bronze medal game		
#	Year	Host	Gold	Score	Silver	Bronze	Score	Fourth place
4	2007; Details	(Morocco) Rabat	South Africa	68–61	Morocco	Algeria	–	
5	2009; Details	(South Africa) Johannesburg	Algeria	77–72	South Africa	Morocco	88–28	Angola
6	2011; Details	(Morocco) Rabat	South Africa	83–54	Morocco	Egypt	62–33	Nigeria
7	2013; Details	(Angola) Luanda	Algeria	66–56	South Africa	Egypt	71–68	Morocco
8	2015; Details	(Algeria) Algiers	Algeria	74–63	Morocco	South Africa	77–65	Egypt
9	2017; Details	(South Africa) Durban	Morocco	63–32	Algeria	Egypt	53–50	South Africa
10	2020; Details	(South Africa) Johannesburg	Algeria	63–54	Morocco	Egypt	64–59	South Africa
11	2022; Details	(Ethiopia) Addis Ababa	Egypt	^{n/a}	South Africa	DR Congo	^{n/a}	Ethiopia
12	2026; Details	(Angola) Luanda	Morocco	59–42	South Africa	Senegal	51–48	Algeria

^n/a A round-robin tournament determined the final standings.

=== Women ===
#	Year	Host	Gold medal game			Bronze medal game		
#	Year	Host	Gold	Score	Silver	Bronze	Score	Fourth place
1	2015; Details	(Algeria) Algiers	Algeria	60–47	South Africa	Nigeria	56–6	Morocco
2	2017; Details	(South Africa) Durban	Algeria	53–25	South Africa	Zimbabwe	29–6	Kenya
3	2020; Details	(South Africa) Johannesburg	Algeria	62–26	South Africa	No third place match		
4	2022; Details	(Ethiopia) Addis Ababa	Algeria	^{n/a}	South Africa	Ethiopia		
5	2026; Details	(Angola) Luanda	Algeria	45–30	South Africa	Angola	36–21	Morocco

^n/a A round-robin tournament determined the final standings.

== See also ==
- Wheelchair basketball at the Summer Paralympics
- IWBF U23 World Wheelchair Basketball Championship
- Asia Oceania Wheelchair Basketball Championships
- Invictus Games
- Warrior Games
- WheelPower
