= 2013 IWBF Men's U23 Wheelchair Basketball World Championship =

International wheelchair basketball competition

2013 IWBF Men's U23 World Championship
- Venue: Yüreğir Serinevler Arena, Menderes Sports Hall.
- Location: Adana, Turkey
- Start date: 7 September
- End date: 14 September
- Competitors: 12 teams from 12 nations

The 2013 IWBF Men's U23 World Championship was the fifth edition of the IWBF U23 World Wheelchair Basketball Championship held in Adana, Turkey from 7 to 14 September 2013. The tournament was played in two venues, the Yüreğir Serinevler Arena and the Menderes Sports Hall.

== Medalists ==
Event	Gold	Silver	Bronze
Men's	Germany	Sweden	Australia
Men's	Jens Albrecht; Phillip Schorp; Christopher Huber; Tim Lange; Lukas Jung; Kai Möller; Thomas Böhme; Jan Sadler; Nico Dreimueller; Leon Ole Schöneberg; Dominik Zielke	Axel Wernas; Jesper Persson; Erik Nylander; Carl Fritzell; Joakim Lindblom; Olle Svensson; Peter Nilsson; Oskar Clementz; Christian Seidel	Tom O'Neill-Thorne; Kayl Jeffrey; Michael AuPrince; Jake Kavanagh; Clarence Grogan; Jordan Bartley; Jannik Blair; Bailey Rowland; Bradley Fisher; Luke Pople; Colin Smith; Ryan Morich

== Squads ==
Each of the 12 teams selected a squad of up to 12 players for the tournament.

Athletes are given an eight-level-score specific to wheelchair basketball, ranging from 0.5 to 4.5. Lower scores represent a higher degree of disability The sum score of all players on the court cannot exceed 14.

== Preliminary round ==
All times local (UTC+03:00)

=== Group A ===
Team̹̹	Pld	W	L	PF	PA	PD	Pts
Germany	5	5	0	376	285	+91	10
Iran	5	4	1	364	289	+75	9
Great Britain	5	3	2	304	263	+41	8
Canada	5	2	3	266	297	-31	7
Mexico	5	1	4	263	292	-29	6
South Africa	5	0	5	168	315	-147	5

7 September
10:15

Canada	62–31	South Africa

Yüreğir Serinevler Arena, Adana

7 September
11:45

Great Britain	67–42	Mexico

Menderes Sports Hall, Adana

7 September
14:00

Germany	91–89	Iran

Menderes Sports Hall, Adana

8 September
12:15

South Africa	30–78	Germany

Yüreğir Serinevler Arena, Adana

8 September
14:30

Mexico	56–70	Iran

Yüreğir Serinevler Arena, Adana

8 September
16:45

Great Britain	57–50	Canada

Yüreğir Serinevler Arena, Adana

9 September
11:45

Mexico	48–31	South Africa

Menderes Sports Hall, Adana

9 September
12:15

Canada	45–68	Germany

Yüreğir Serinevler Arena, Adana

9 September
16:45

Iran	60–53	Great Britain

Yüreğir Serinevler Arena, Adana

10 September
14:00

Mexico	58–61	Canada

Menderes Sports Hall, Adana

10 September
14:30

Iran	62–41	South Africa

Yüreğir Serinevler Arena, Adana

10 September
19:00

Great Britain	62–76	Germany
Scoring by quarter: 14-13, 13-21, 20-12, 15-30
Pts: Bridge 25; Rebs: Brown 6 Asts: Pratt, Brown 3		Pts: Böhme, Schöneberg 20; Rebs: Schöneberg 14; Asts: Albrecht 9

Yüreğir Serinevler Arena, Adana

11 September
14:00

Canada	48–83	Iran
Scoring by quarter: 12-20, 8-22, 15-20, 13-21
Pts: Dallaire 12; Rebs: Goncin 8 Asts: Goncin 5		Pts: Ebrahimi 33; Rebs: Ebrahimi 13; Asts: Ebrahimi, Abed 4

Menderes Sports Hall, Adana

11 September
14:30

South Africa	35–65	Great Britain
Scoring by quarter: 11-22, 7-18, 11-12, 6-13
Pts: Walgenbach 12; Rebs: Williams 9 Asts: Mazantsana 3		Pts: Bates 13; Rebs: Bates 10; Asts: Bridge 4

Yüreğir Serinevler Arena, Adana

11 September
16:45

Germany	63–59	Mexico
Scoring by quarter: 17-12, 17-17, 18-18, 11-12
Pts: Möller 16; Rebs: Möller 7 Asts: Böhme 7		Pts: Sandoval 21; Rebs: Arredondo 11; Asts: Flores, Dueñas 2

Yüreğir Serinevler Arena, Adana

=== Group B ===
Team	Pld	W	L	PF	PA	PD	Pts
Sweden	5	4	1	324	272	+52	9
Turkey	5	4	1	358	240	+118	9
Australia	5	3	2	337	236	+101	8
Italy	5	3	2	312	299	+13	8
Japan	5	1	4	260	300	-40	6
Venezuela	5	0	5	167	411	-244	5

7 September
12:30

Japan	51–70	Italy

Yüreğir Serinevler Arena, Adana

7 September
14:45

Australia	55–57	Sweden

Yüreğir Serinevler Arena, Adana

7 September
19:00

Turkey	92–35	Venezuela

Yüreğir Serinevler Arena, Adana

8 September
11:45

Japan	50–71	Sweden

Menderes Sports Hall, Adana

8 September
14:00

Venezuela	32–93	Australia

Menderes Sports Hall, Adana

8 September
19:00

Italy	46–68	Turkey

Yüreğir Serinevler Arena, Adana

9 September
14:..?

Sweden	64–36	Venezuela

Menderes Sports Hall, Adana

9 September
14:30

Australia	80–41	Italy

Yüreğir Serinevler Arena, Adana

9 September
19:00

Turkey	73–40	Japan

Yüreğir Serinevler Arena, Adana

10 September
11:45

Italy	70–65	Sweden

Menderes Sports Hall, Adana

10 September
12:15

Japan	77–29	Venezuela

Yüreğir Serinevler Arena, Adana

10 September
16:45

Turkey	64–52	Australia
Scoring by quarter: 18-17, 12-9, 18-16, 16-10
Pts: Çetingöz 30; Rebs: Çetingöz 11; Asts: Çetingöz 5		Pts: Pople 18; Rebs: Auprince 8 Asts: O'Neill-Thorne, Jeffrey 3

Yüreğir Serinevler Arena, Adana

11 September
11:45

Australia	57–42	Japan
Scoring by quarter: 19-12, 9-14, 12-5, 17-11
Pts: O'Neill-Thorne, Morich 12; Rebs: Morich 9 Asts: O'Neill-Thorne 7		Pts: Murakami, Fukuzawa 13; Rebs: Murakami, Fukuzawa 11; Asts: Fukuzawa, Ota 4

Menderes Sports Hall, Adana

11 September
12:15

Venezuela	35–85	Italy
Scoring by quarter: 5-23, 4-21, 13-26, 13-15
Pts: Chirinos 16; Rebs: Betancourt 12; Asts: Betancourt 2		Pts: Carossino 21; Rebs: Miceli 9 Asts: Miceli 8

Yüreğir Serinevler Arena, Adana

11 September
19:00

Sweden	67–61	Turkey
Scoring by quarter: 13-14, 20-16, 18-14, 16-17
Pts: Nilsson 24; Rebs: Nilsson 11; Asts: Lindblom 6		Pts: Çetingöz 26; Rebs: Efetürk 9 Asts: Çetingöz 10

Yüreğir Serinevler Arena, Adana

== Knockout stage ==
=== Quarterfinals ===
Quarter-finals
12 September 2013
Iran	61
Australia	66
12 September 2013
Sweden	71
Canada	66
12 September 2013
Turkey	53
Great Britain	63
12 September 2013
Germany	64
Italy	38

Semi-finals
13 September 2013
Australia	58
Sweden	69
13 September 2013
Great Britain	44
Germany	57

Final
14 September 2013
Sweden	65
Germany	69
Third place
14 September 2013
Great Britain	52
Australia	54

Semi-finals
13 September
Italy	58
Iran	70
13 September
Canada	62
Turkey	54

Fifth place
14 September
Iran	67
Canada	38
Seventh place
14 September
Turkey	64
Italy	62

12 September
12:15

Iran	61–66	Australia
Scoring by quarter: 18-20, 13-13, 16-16, 14-17
Pts: Ebrahimi 29; Rebs: Ebrahimi, Hadiazhar 9 Asts: Hadiazhar 6		Pts: O'Neill-Thorne 24; Rebs: O'Neill-Thorne 10; Asts: O'Neill-Thorne 5

Yüreğir Serinevler Arena, Adana

12 September
14:30

Germany	64–38	Italy
Scoring by quarter: 13-11, 14-6, 16-8, 21-13
Pts: Schöneberg 18; Rebs: Schöneberg 18; Asts: Böhme 12		Pts: Carossino 20; Rebs: De Maggi 9 Asts: Miceli 5

Yüreğir Serinevler Arena, Adana

12 September
16:45

Turkey	53–63	Great Britain
Scoring by quarter: 16-17, 12-15, 10-11, 15-20
Pts: Çetingöz, Özbudak 16; Rebs: Şafak 12; Asts: Çetingöz 4		Pts: Brown 21; Rebs: Pratt, Ross 8 Asts: Pratt 7

Yüreğir Serinevler Arena, Adana

12 September
19:00

Sweden	71–66	Canada
Scoring by quarter: 21-15, 22-17, 16-18, 12-16
Pts: Nilsson 23; Rebs: Nilsson 11; Asts: Lindblom 17		Pts: Goncin 40; Rebs: Goncin 12; Asts: Vernette 7

Yüreğir Serinevler Arena, Adana

==== 9th-12th semifinals ====
11th place game

13 September
11:45

South Africa	73–49	Venezuela
Scoring by quarter: 23-11, 21-13, 15-17, 14-8
Pts: Williams 25; Rebs: Walgenbach 7 Asts: Mazantsana 11		Pts: Chirinos 35; Rebs: Chirinos 13; Asts: Betancourt 4

Menderes Sports Hall, Adana

9th place game

13 September
14:00

Mexico	47–55	Japan
Scoring by quarter: 8-14, 12-14, 10-10, 17-17
Pts: Martinez 18; Rebs: Martinez 8 Asts: Sandoval 4		Pts: Murakami 16; Rebs: Fukuzawa 20; Asts: Murakami 6

Menderes Sports Hall, Adana

==== 5th-8th semifinals ====
13 September
12:15

Italy	58–70	Iran
Scoring by quarter: 9-22, 18-22, 11-14, 20-12
Pts: De Maggi 16; Rebs: De Maggi, Carossino 10; Asts: Miceli 7		Pts: Abedi 20; Rebs: Hadiazhar 16; Asts: Hadiazhar 5

Yüreğir Serinevler Arena, Adana

13 September
16:45

Canada	62–54	Turkey
Scoring by quarter: 16-19, 12-12, 14-16, 20-7
Pts: Goncin 31; Rebs: Goncin 15; Asts: Goncin 6		Pts: Şafak 34; Rebs: Şafak 12; Asts: Çetingöz 15

Yüreğir Serinevler Arena, Adana

7th place game

14 September
14:45

Turkey	66–64	Italy
Scoring by quarter: 20-12, 10-16, 16-20, 20-16
Pts: Çetingöz 27; Rebs: Çetingöz 14; Asts: Çetingöz 9		Pts: De Maggi 27; Rebs: De Maggi 13; Asts: Miceli 12

Yüreğir Serinevler Arena, Adana

5th place game

14 September
10:15

Iran	67–38	Canada
Scoring by quarter: 17-11, 11-8, 20-10, 19-9
Pts: Sayari, Hadiazhar 16; Rebs: Abedi, Hadiazhar 12; Asts: Kheragmand 5		Pts: Dallaire, Hickley 6 Rebs: Goncin 12; Asts: Goncin 6

Yüreğir Serinevler Arena, Adana

=== Semifinals ===
13 September
14:30

Australia	58–69	Sweden
Scoring by quarter: 15-19, 13-15, 16-20, 14-15
Pts: O'Neill-Thorne 18; Rebs: O'Neill-Thorne 7 Asts: O'Neill-Thorne 6		Pts: Lindblom 26; Rebs: Nilsson 14; Asts: Nilsson 15

Yüreğir Serinevler Arena, Adana

13 September
19:00

Great Britain	44–57	Germany
Scoring by quarter: 8-17, 14-14, 10-11, 12-15
Pts: Bridge 15; Rebs: Pratt 5 Asts: Bridge 2		Pts: Böhme 19; Rebs: Schöneberg 12; Asts: Albrecht, Böhme 2

Yüreğir Serinevler Arena, Adana

=== Bronze medal game ===
14 September
12:30

Great Britain	52–54	Australia
Scoring by quarter: 17-12, 9-15, 12-10, 14-17
Pts: Fox 16; Rebs: Brown 9 Asts: Pratt 7		Pts: Pople 19; Rebs: Pople 7 Asts: O'Neill-Thorne 11

Yüreğir Serinevler Arena, Adana

=== Final ===
14 September
17:00

Sweden	65–69	Germany
Scoring by quarter: 18-14, 16-20, 12-9, 19-26
Pts: Lindblom 26; Rebs: Nilsson 12; Asts: Lindblom 11		Pts: Böhme 28; Rebs: Möller 11; Asts: Albrecht 6

Yüreğir Serinevler Arena, Adana

2013 IWBF Men's U23 World Championship

Germany
1st title

== Final standings ==
Rank	Team
1	Germany
2	Sweden
3	Australia
4	Great Britain
5	Iran
6	Canada
7	Turkey
8	Italy
9	Japan
10	Mexico
11	South Africa
12	Venezuela
