= Şakirpaşa =

- Neighbourhood
- Location in Turkey
- Coordinates: 36°59′30″N 35°16′41″E
- Country: Turkey
- Province: Adana
- District: Seyhan

Government
  - Muhtar: Hakan Arınkal
- Elevation: 20 m (66 ft)
- Population (2022): 11,108
- Time zone: UTC+3 (TRT)
- Area code: 0322

Şakirpaşa (Turkish pronunciation: [ʃakiɾpaʃa]) is a neighbourhood (mahalle) in the municipality and district of Seyhan, Adana Province, Turkey. Its population is 11,108 (2022). It is 3 km west of the city centre of Adana. The neighborhood is situated south of the D400 state road, next to the Şakirpaşa Airport.

== Governance ==
Şakirpaşa is a mahalle and it is administered by the Muhtar and the Seniors Council.

== Demographics ==
Most of the residents are Kurdish.

== Economy ==
Şakirpaşa is a low-income working-class neighborhood. Most of the residents work at the factories and shops at low-paid jobs.

== Sports ==
ABB Şakirpaşa is a handball club that promoted to the Turkish Women's Handball Super League on 21 April 2016, at the playoff finals in Ankara. The venue of Şakirpaşa is Yüreğir Serinevler Arena.

== Transport ==
Şakirpaşa Airport is within the mahalle borders, 2 km from the residential areas.

Şakirpaşa Railway Station is 400 m north of the neighborhood, at the Sakarya mahalle, one block north of the D400 state road. The station is currently served by two regional lines and one long-distance line.

Adana Metropolitan Municipality Bus Department (ABBO) has bus routes from downtown Adana to Şakirpaşa. Şakirpaşa Minibus Co-operative also conducts local transport from downtown.
