= Menderes Sports Hall =

Multi-purpose indoor arena in Adana, Turkey

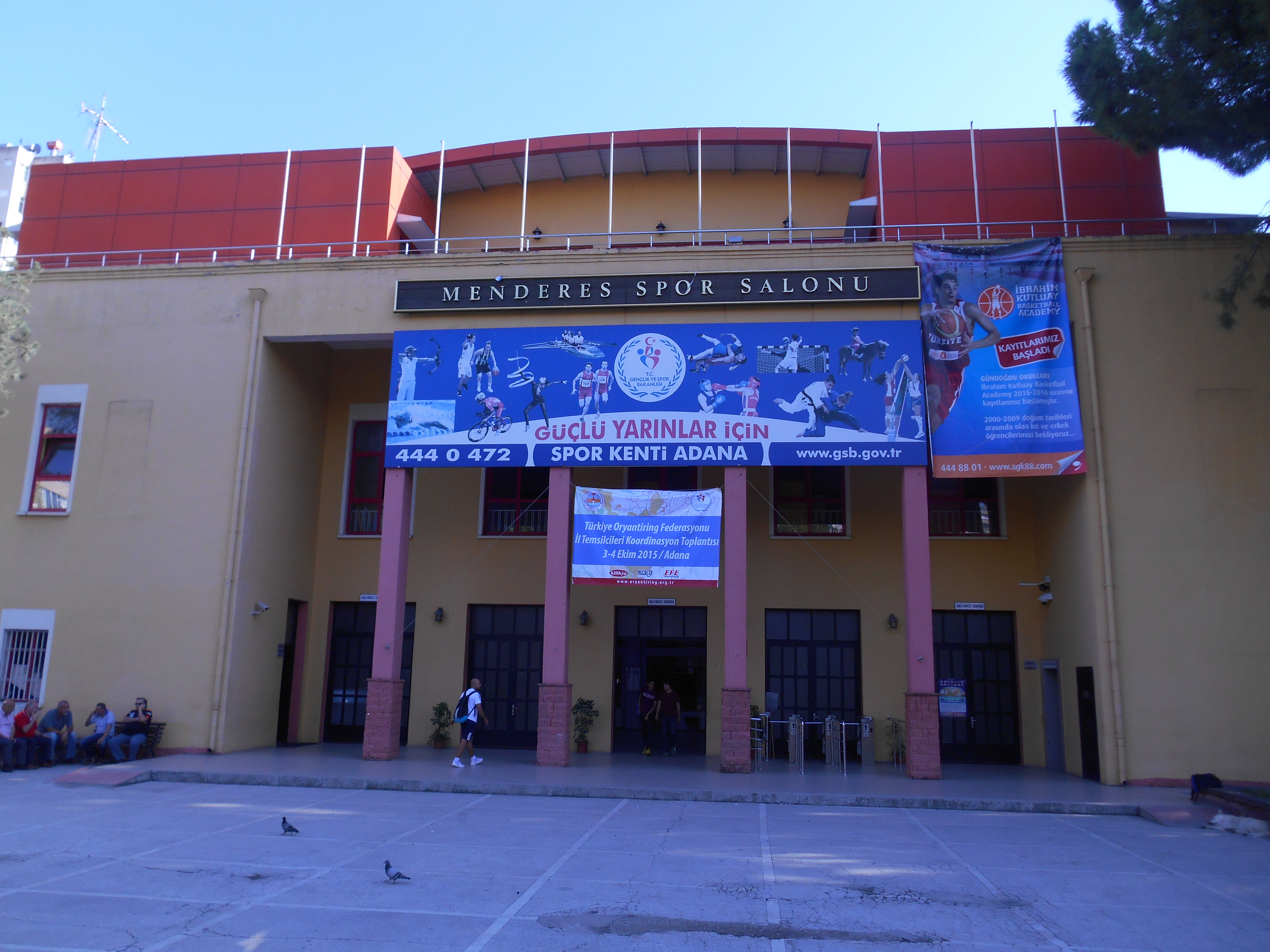
- Interactive map of Menderes Sports Hall
- Location: Vali Yolu Cad. 26, Reşatbey, Seyhan, Adana
- Coordinates: 36°59′59″N 35°19′51″E
- Owner: Republic of Turkey
- Operator: Adana Youth and Sports Directorate
- Capacity: Basketball: 2000; Volleyball: 2000

Construction
- Opened: 1938

Tenant
- Ceyhan Basketbol

Menderes Sports Hall is a multi-purpose indoor arena located in Adana, situated just next to the 5 Ocak Stadium. The arena is opened in 1938 together with the stadium as a sports complex.

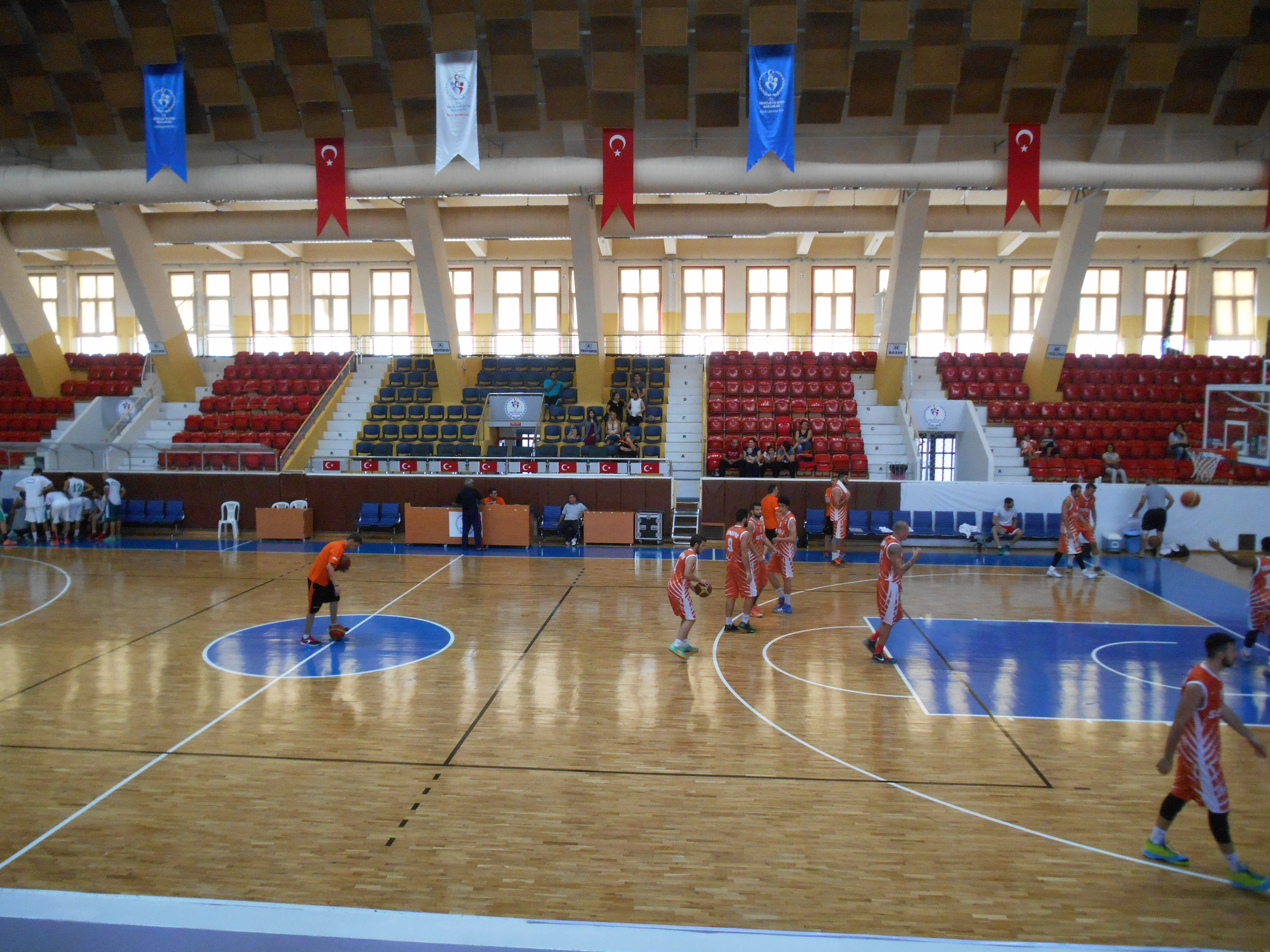
Inside the hall

The sports hall has an audience capacity of 2000. It hosts national and international sports events such as basketball, volleyball, wrestling and weightlifting, concerts and congresses among others. The facility contains two wall mounted scoreboards, two locker rooms, a press room, a cafeteria and VIP lounge.

The 2nd division professional basketball team of Ceyhan Basketbol play their Turkish League home matches in the Menderes Sports Hall.

2013 IWBF Men's U23 Wheelchair Basketball World Championship was held in the arena from September 7th to 14th.

== Images ==
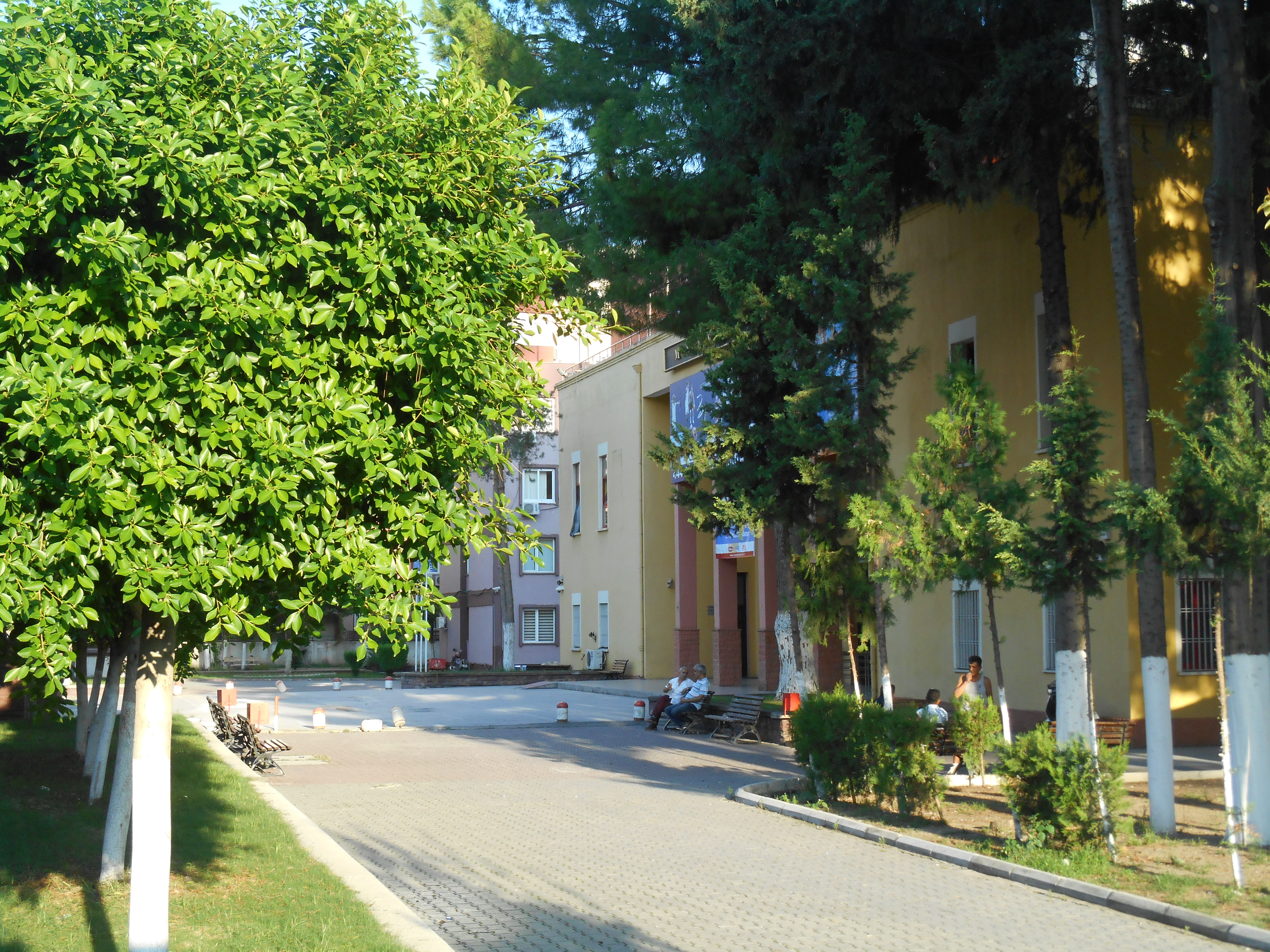
Frontyard

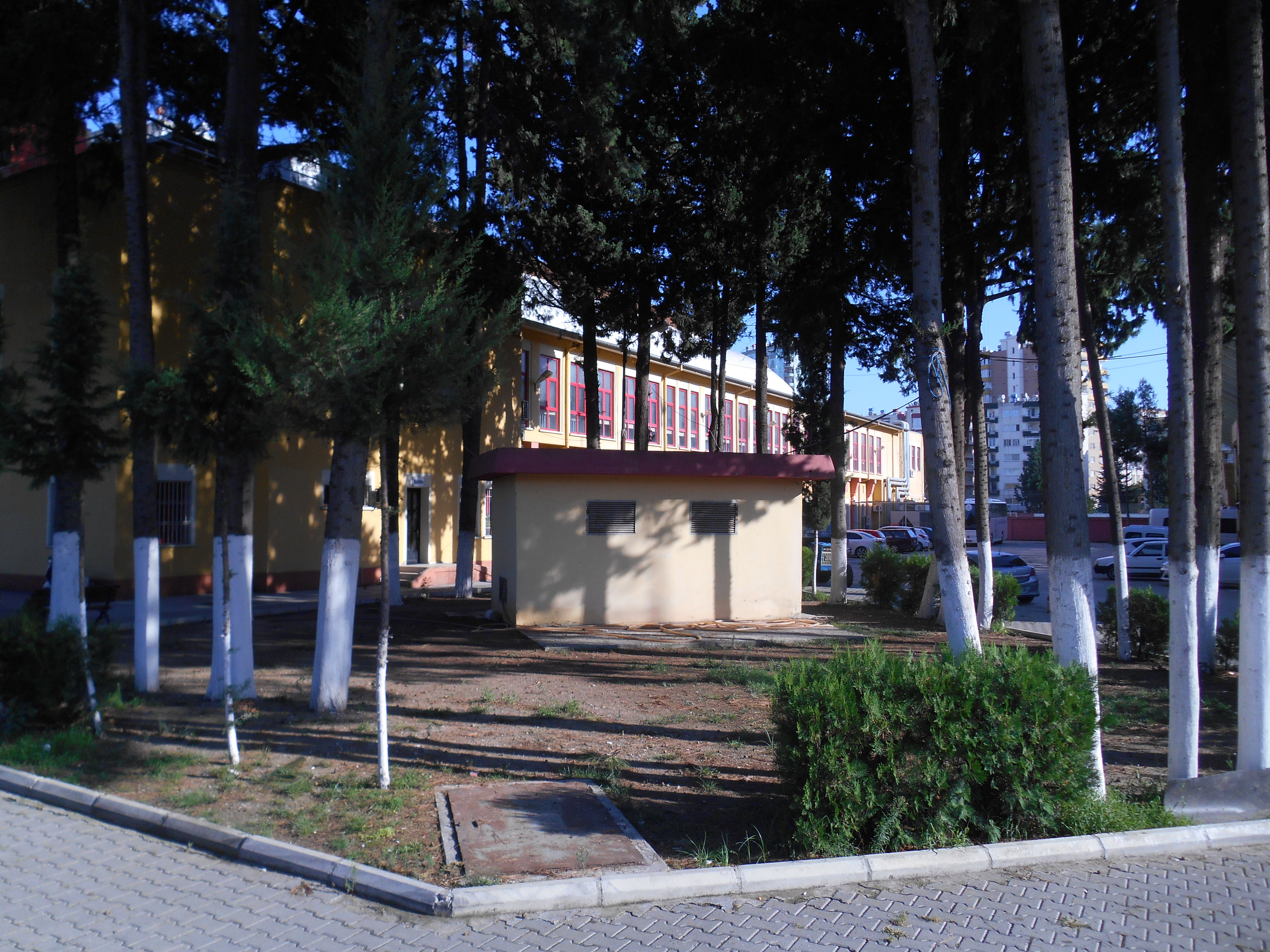
Side view

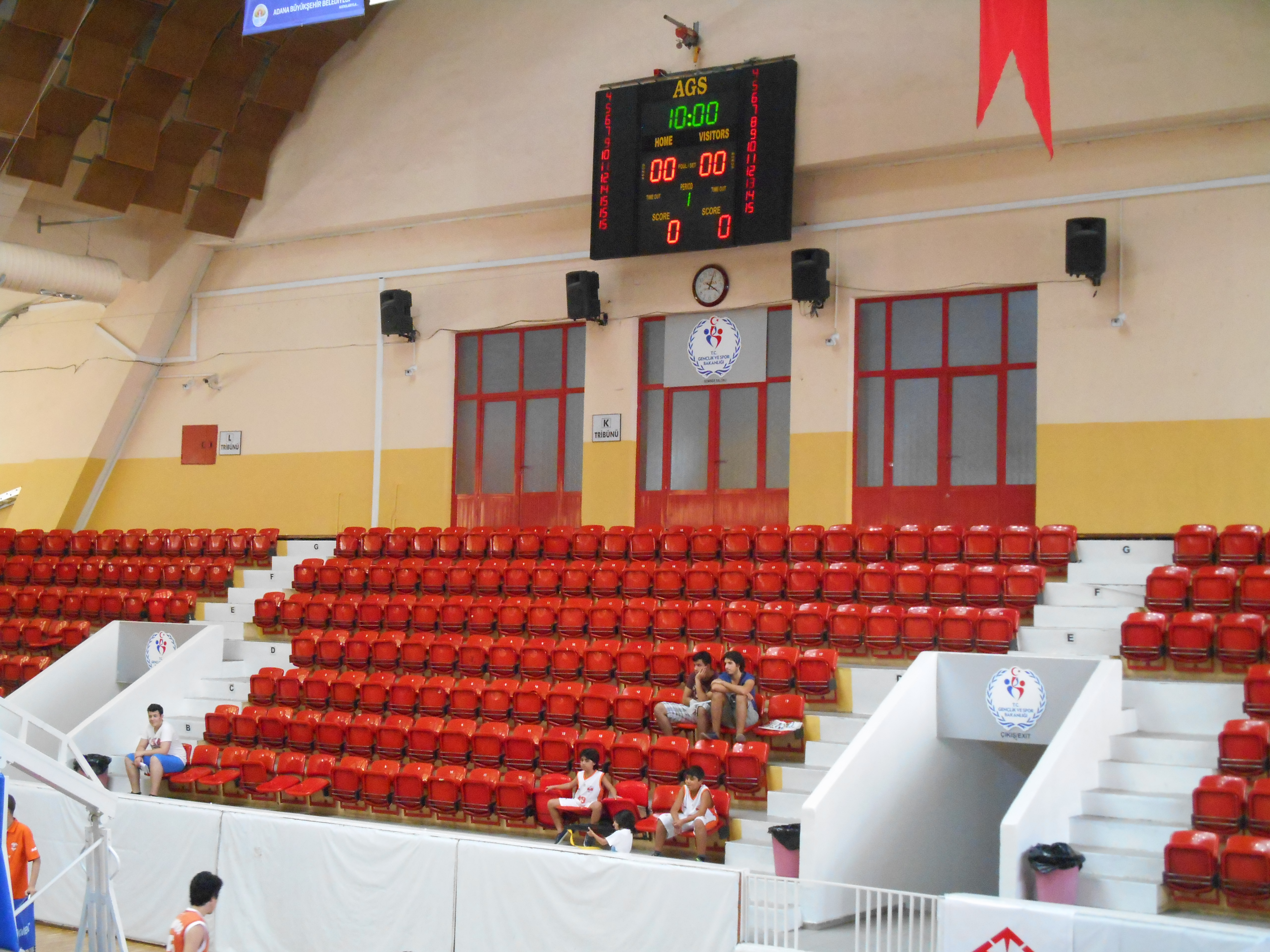
Scoreboard

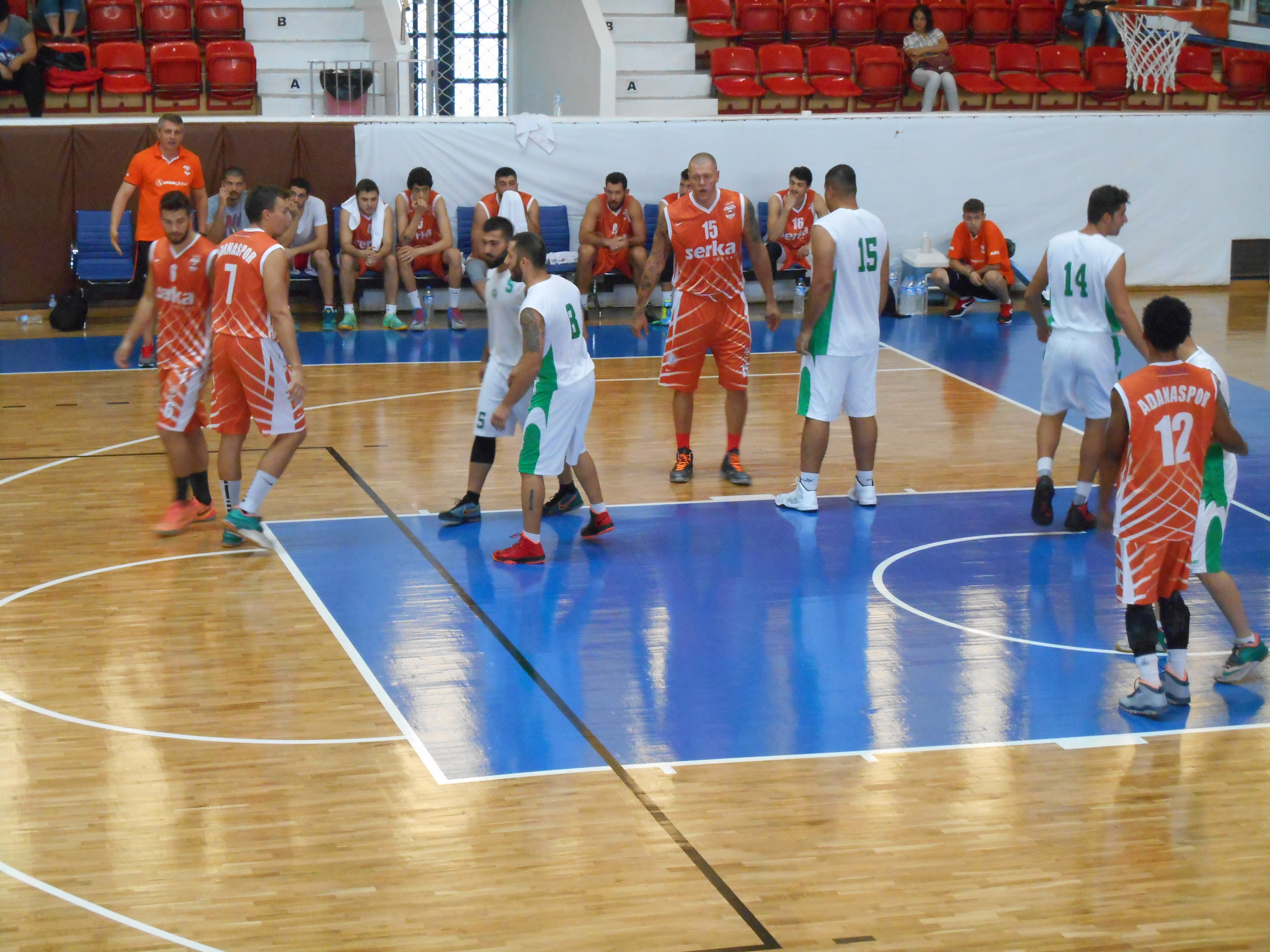
Adanaspor in action
