= Clara Gregory Baer =

American physical education instructor and women's sports pioneer

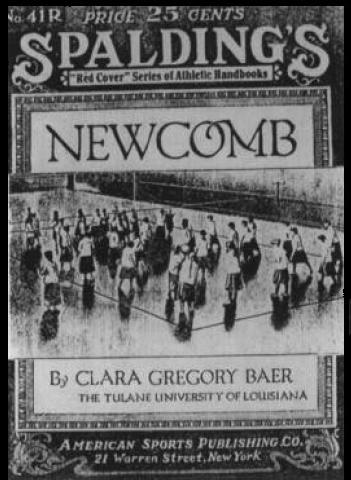
Clara Gregory Baer's original rules of Newcomb ball

Clara Gregory Baer (August 27, 1863 – January 19, 1938) was an American physical education instructor and women's sports pioneer. Baer introduced the first teacher certification course for physical education in the Southern United States, and authored the first published rules of women's basketball. She also developed the sport of Newcomb ball and played a role in the early development of netball.

== Early life ==
Baer was born in Algiers, Louisiana to Hamilton John Baer, and Ellen Douglas Riley. She attended secondary school in Louisville, Kentucky and then attended the Emerson School of Oratory, the Boston School of Expression, and the Posse Normal School of Physical Education, all in Boston. After college, she returned to the South, initially invited by the Southern Athletic Club to teach gymnastics to women. At the time, the Club was an all-male club, although wives, sisters and daughters were permitted to use the club once a week for Baer's lesson. Baer decided to contact the president of Newcomb College, now part of Tulane University, to inquire about the possibility of a job teaching physical education to students. She was hired on a trial basis, as physical education was not yet an established part of the curriculum. Her position was made permanent, and she eventually completed a 38-year career in physical education and teacher training. Baer was hired by the Sophie Newcomb College to start a physical education department in 1891. She started the first teacher certification program in the South, as well as the first four-year degree program in physical education. The teacher certification program was established in 1893, and the degree program was initiated in 1907.

== Women's sports ==
Baer is best known as the author of the first book of rules for women's basketball in 1896 Baer also created netball around roughly the same period. Although Senda Berenson introduced basketball to Smith College in 1892, Berenson did not publish her version of the rules until 1899, so Baer is credited with the first publication of rules for women's basketball. As Baer noted:

It was in 1893 that basket-ball was introduced at Newcomb and into the South. At that time the game had not reached its present development. When Newcomb College first tried basket-ball in its gymnastic work, there were no published rules for women, none of the fine points of control that characterize the game today. The results were naturally to be expected; its introduction at Newcomb was not entirely satisfactory. Later, a compromise was reached by modifying the game for girls.

— Clara Baer, 1914 address to the National Education Association

Baer first called the game 'basquette', a name later dropped in her first revision of rules called Sophie Newcomb College Basketball Rules published in 1908. Players were not allowed to dribble, guard, or snatch the ball. Players were not allowed to make two-handed passes, as it was believed that this type of pass could compress the chest. The game she described had a court with seven divisions, and players were not allowed to move out of their designated region. This restriction developed out of a misunderstanding. Baer had written to James Naismith, asking for a copy of the rules of the game he invented. Naismith had sent her a copy, including a diagram of the court. The diagram had dotted lines on it, indicating where players were best able to cover. She interpreted the lines as restrictions on where the players could move. As a result, the first rules for women contained these restrictions. Baer described the jump shot as well as a one-handed shot, notable because neither of these shots would make an appearance in the men's game prior to 1936.

Several of Baer's innovations were included in the first unified rules of women's basketball and were published in 1901. The errors Baer had made as a result of her misunderstanding of Naismith's rules package became ratified into the rules for women's basketball in 1899 and proliferated which also resulted in the creation of a new and separate sport called "Netball", still played today primarily in Commonwealth nations.

== Newcomb ball ==
As a physical education instructor at Newcomb College in Louisiana, she also invented the game "Newcomb ball", now played as a variation of volleyball. Baer had ordered some baskets to play basketball, but the baskets had not yet arrived, so she decided to create a substitute sport. In a letter to the Posse Gymnasium Journal, she described the basic elements of the game, consisting of a court divided at the midpoint, with lines marking where the players could move, and outlining the object of the game, to "make the ball touch the opposite ground, beyond the base—when it counts a point for the side sending the ball". This game would eventually become Newcomb ball, and has many similarities to the game of volleyball. The letter by Baer appeared in the January, 1895 edition of the journal, while the first game of volleyball, invented by William G. Morgan was reported to be first played in February 1895. Her rules of basquette also played a pivotal role in the early development of netball.

== Physical education ==
Baer delivered an address to the National Education Association in 1914, summarizing the "History of the Development of Physical Education At Newcomb College". In her address she listed the course available at the school:

1. "[T]he regular practical work of the gymnasium, including hygienic, corrective, medical, and aesthetic gymnastics."
2. "[A] theory course. This is a lecture course including personal and general hygiene, voice culture and expression. The department is closely allied with that of biology; and in certain years the lectures include the study of exercises from the standpoint of biology."
3. "[A] training course for teachers providing technical instruction in kinesiology and allied subjects, with practice in teaching. This course is designed to meet the needs of those students who wish to specialize in physical education."
4. "[A]n extension course for teachers in connection with the regular extension work of Tulane University."

== See also ==
- History of netball
- Timeline of women's basketball history
