= Newcomb ball =

Ball game

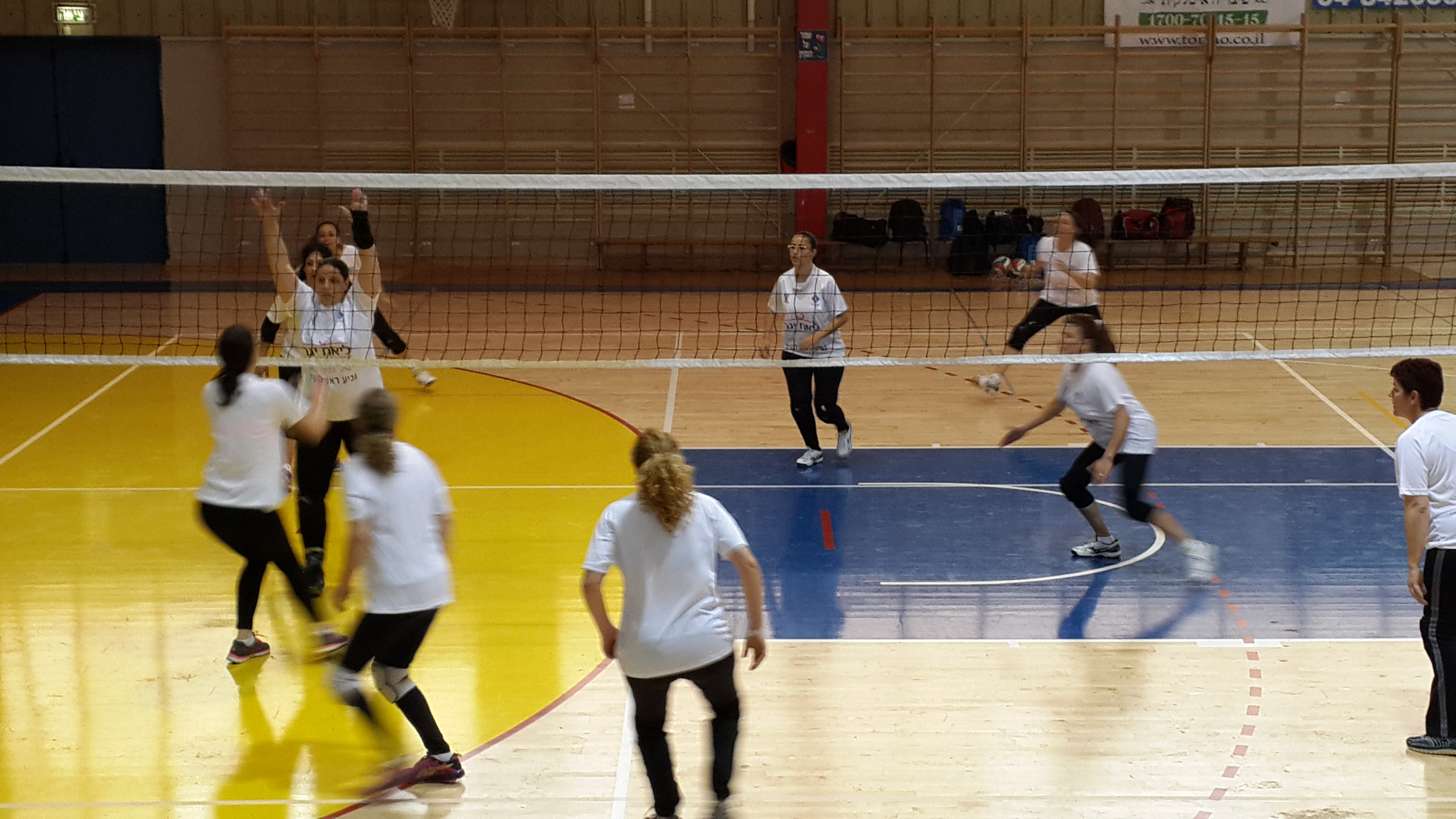
- Game of Newcomb ball in action, 2015
- Highest governing body: National Newcomb Advisory Committee (now defunct)
- Nicknames: Nuke 'em
- First played: 1895; 131 years ago: Rules first published by Clara Gregory Baer in 1910 in USA

Characteristics
- Contact: No
- Team members: Up to 20 per team
- Type: male and female
- Equipment: Similar to volleyball

Presence
- Olympic: No
- World Games: No

Newcomb ball (also known as Newcomb+, and sometimes spelled Newcombe (ball) and Mamanet or Catchball) (Note: As the game is named after Sophie Newcomb College, its name has been typically capitalized.) is a ball game played in a gymnasium or court using two opposing teams and a net. Newcomb ball and the sport of volleyball were both created in 1895 and are similar in their design. The sport rivaled volleyball in popularity and participation by the 1920s. The sport of throwball may be a possible relative.

Newcomb ball was invented in 1895 by Clara Baer, a physical education instructor at Sophie Newcomb College of Tulane University in New Orleans. The sport is one of a small number of sports created by women, and was the second team sport in the United States to be played by women (the first being basketball). In 1996, an article in the Journal of Sport History written by Joan Paul speculated that Newcomb ball may have preceded the creation of volleyball and may have influenced its development.

== Early development ==
Baer invented the game of Newcomb as the result of an effort "to place before her students a game that could be easily arranged, could include any number of students, could be played in any designated time and in any available space". The game was first publicised in an article by Baer in the Posse Gymnasium Journal, where the name "Newcomb" was first coined. A more detailed paper was later prepared for the American Physical Education Association, which was received with "hearty approval". Baer first officially published a description of the game in 1895, together with the first book of rules for women's basketball.

Originally, Newcomb ball involved two teams placed facing each other in a small gymnasium, the object being for one team to "throw the ball into the other team’s area with such direction and force that it caused the ball to hit the floor without being caught." This was called a "touch-down" and scored a point for the throwing team.

== Events ==
Today's Cooperative Game is called Newcomb. Newcomb ball is a dying sport with hardly any competitive events conducted.

=== Mamanet ===
CSIT and World Mamanet Federation have competitions. Newcomb similar to Mamanet.

== Original rules (1910) ==
=== The game ===
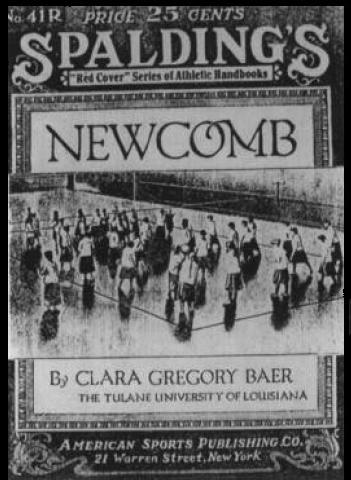
Newcomb featured in Spalding's Red Cover series of athletic handbooks in 1914

Baer published an official set of rules in 1910. These listed 22 separate rules and 16 fouls, with the major objective still being to score touch-downs by throwing the ball so that it hit the ground or floor on the opponent's side of the court. The game was to be played with an official "Newcomb Ball".

=== The court ===
The playing area was divided by a "Division Line" into two equal halves. The height of the rope defining the Division Line varied from three to seven feet/0.9 to 2.1 m, according to the age of the players. Neutral zones called "Bases" were marked across the entire court, six to seven feet/1.8 to 2.1 m from the Division Line. The space between the Base and the end of the playing area was called the "Court".

=== The rules ===
The rules were defined as follows:

1. A "touch-down" shall count for the side sending the ball
2. A foul shall add one point to the opponent's score.
3. A majority of points shall decide the game.
4. The team that secures the "toss-up" opens the game.
5. The players must stand within the Boundary Lines.
6. No players shall step over the lines except to secure an "out" ball, or when running for the "Toss-up".
7. A ball thrown by a player out of the Boundary Lines shall be counted a foul.
8. The ball must be thrown with one hand. It cannot be kicked.
9. No player shall catch or throw the ball while down. She or he must be standing.
10. The ball must clear the rope and touch the opposite court to constitute a "touch-down".
11. If a ball is batted into the neutral ground by a player receiving it, it shall constitute a foul against the side receiving the ball.
12. An "out" ball beyond the Boundary Lines shall not constitute a foul unless tapped by a player as it passes over the court, when it counts against the side receiving the ball. it should be returned to play at the nearest point of its passage and exit from the court.
13. If, in passing the ball to another player on the same team, it should drop to the floor (ground) it shall constitute a foul.
14. In the gymnasium, when the ball strikes any flat surface it may constitute a point.
15. A ball striking the wall and bounding into the neutral ground shall constitute a foul for the team sending the ball.
16. There shall be no protests, except by the Captain; no talking, no general disturbance of the game.
17. The ball must not be thrown under the ropes nor between the Base Line.
18. In match game, unavoidable loss of time shall be deducted.
19. When the question arises between teams as to whose ball shall be used, each team may furnish the ball for one-half of the game.
20. In match games, the length of each half must be determined before the game.
21. In the absence of a regular instructor, the Captain shall decide the position of the players on the court.
22. The teams shall change courts during the second half of the game.

=== Fouls ===
The following were defined as fouls:

1. When the ball touches the rope.
2. When the ball passes under the rope.
3. When the ball falls into neutral ground – counts against side sending the ball.
4. Tapping the ball over the lines – counts against the side receiving the ball.
5. Striking a player with the ball.
6. Falling.
7. Audible signals.
8. Needlessly rough playing.
9. Unnecessary protests.
10. Talking, or any disturbance of the game.
11. Running all over the court.
12. Stepping over, or on, the Lines.
13. Playing out of Boundary Lines.
14. Needlessly high balls.
15. Dropping the ball.
16. Any violation of the rules of the game.

=== Officials ===
The rules required that each team be represented by a Captain, elected by the team or appointed by the physical education instructor. In match games there was to be a referee, a time-keeper and an official scorer.

== Later rules (1914) ==
A later set of Newcomb rules was published by Baer in 1914, and consisted of 14 rules with 79 sections. By this time the Spalding sports equipment company marketed a "Newcomb Outfit" including ropes and wall-posts. The rope divider was set at six feet/1.8 m for girls' games and eight feet/2.4 m when boys were playing. The revised rules allowed six to twelve players on each side and required both teams to agree on the number of participants at least a week prior to the game. The rules permitted up to twenty players in recreational and playground teams.

A 30-minute time limit, consisting of 15-minute halves, was prescribed for a Newcomb ball match, which could be altered with agreement between the teams before the game began. The rules were also changed so that a point was scored for each foul and the ball awarded to the team fouled, rather than taking the ball back to the center base area for a jump-ball between captains.

== National Newcomb Advisory Committee ==
Around 1911 Baer established a Newcomb game advisory committee. Members included Baroness Rose Posse, President of the Posse Normal School of Gymnastics, Boston, Massachusetts; Miss Ethel Perrin, Supervisor of Physical Training, Detroit Public Schools; Mrs. Fannie Cheever Burton, Associate Professor of Physical Education, State Normal College, Ypsilanti, Michigan; Miss Mary Ida Mann, Instructor, Department of Hygiene and Physical Education, University of Chicago; John E. Lombard, Director of Physical Training, New Orleans Public Schools; and Otto F. Monahan, Physical Director, The Hotchkiss School, Lakeville, Connecticut.

== Newcomb ball today ==
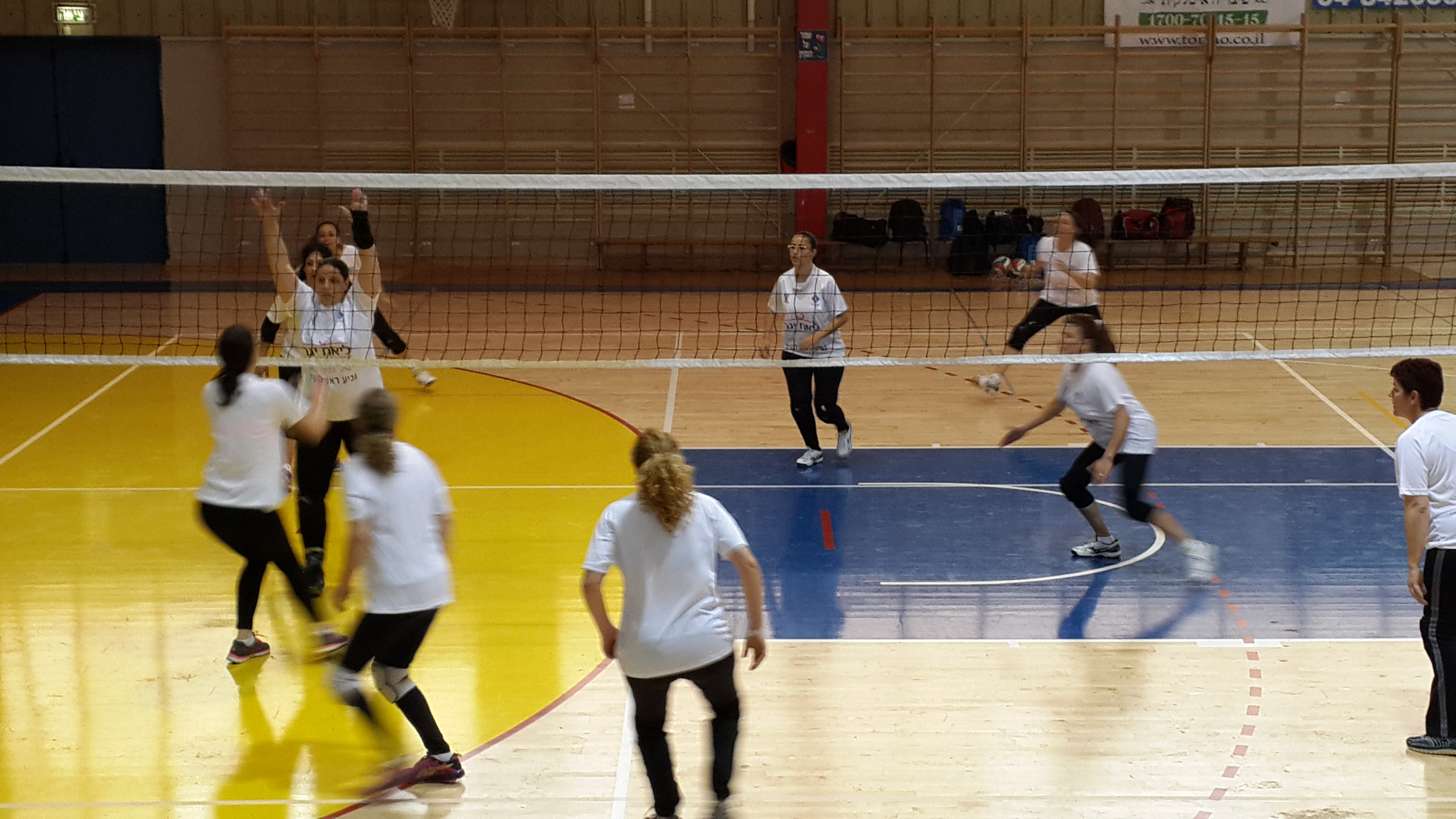
A game of Newcomb ball in action, 2015

Today Newcomb ball is not widely played on a competitive basis, but remains a popular game for people with limited athletic ability or those with certain disabilities or as a simple introduction to volleyball. It has also become popularized in many northern New England summer camps such as Windham Tolland 4H camp in Connecticut. The sport teaches children the fundamentals of volleyball and is beneficial in promoting the development of hand-eye coordination and motor skills. There is evidence of the game being played in the United States, Canada, Mexico, China, Argentina, Australia, and Israel.

Rules may vary widely. One version of Newcomb ball rules today is:

"Two teams each having 9 to 12 players on the court at a time. Play begins with the server from the serving team throwing the ball over the net to the opponents. The ball remains in play being thrown back and forth across the net until there is a miss. Three players may play the ball before throwing it over the net. If the receiving team misses, the serving team scores a point and the next play begins with the same server. If the serving team misses, it loses the serve. No point is scored for either team and the next play begins with the opponents as the serving team. Each time a team wins a point, the same server serves for the next play. Each time a team wins the serve, players on that team rotate and remain in the new position until the serve is lost and won back again. The first team scoring 11 points or a set time limit wins the game."

=== Variations and similar games ===
==== Throwball ====
Throwball, played in India, is very similar to Newcomb ball.

==== Prisoner ball ====
Prisoner ball is a variation of Newcomb ball where players are "taken prisoner" or released from "prison" instead of scoring points.

==== Hooverball ====
Popularized by US President Herbert Hoover, Hooverball is played with a volleyball net and a medicine ball; it is scored like tennis, but the ball is caught and then thrown back as in Newcomb ball. The weight of the medicine ball can make the sport physically demanding. Championship tournaments are held annually in West Branch, Iowa.

==== Scottyball ====
Scott Adams, the creator of Dilbert, describes the details of a game he calls "Scottyball" with rules very similar to Newcomb ball on his blog.

==== Newcomb ball ====
Newcomb ball is sometimes spelled and pronounced "New comb" ball.

==== Cachibol ====
Newcomb ball is also known as cachibol in Spain, Mexico and other Spanish-speaking countries.

==== Catchball (kadureshet) ====
A similar game is called Catchball, or in Hebrew: כּדורשת, romanized: Kadureshet, lit. 'Netball'. An Israeli national league was formed in 2006, and in 2013 consisted of 12 teams. It is the fastest growing sport for women in Israel. Thousands of women join teams all around the country and meet other teams for league games every week The Israeli Catchball Association is the official professional organization. In addition, there is another league called "Mamanet" (its name being a portmanteau of "Mama" and "net") that is organized through schools, especially for mothers of schoolchildren. It is the most popular adult women's sport in Israel.
