= ABB Şakirpaşa =

Turkish handball club

ABB Şakirpaşa GSK
- Full name: Adana Büyükşehir Belediye Şakirpaşa Genç Spor Kulübü
- Short name: ABB Şakirpaşa
- Founded: 2012
- Arena: Yüreğir Serinevler Arena
- Capacity: 2000
- President: İzzet Vezir
- Head coach: Ali Rıza Yeşil
- League: Turkish Women's Handball Super League
- 2015–16: First League Champion

ABB Şakirpaşa is a handball club based in the Şakirpaşa neighbourhood of the city of Adana. The club's women's team promoted to the Turkish Handball Super League on 21 April 2016, at the playoff finals in Ankara. The venue of the club is Yüreğir Serinevler Arena.
