= Mehmet Çetingöz =

Turkish wheelchair basketball player

Beşiktaş JK
- Position: Center
- League: Turkish Wheelchair Basketball Super League

Personal information
- Born: May 12, 1991 (age 35) Şanlıurfa, Turkey

Career history
- 2005–13: Şanlırfa Wheelchair

Mehmet Çetingöz (born May 12, 1991, in Şanlıurfa, Turkey) is a Turkish wheelchair basketball player who plays the center position. He is a 4 point player competing for Beşiktaş JK wheelchair basketball team. He is part of the Turkey men's junior national wheelchair basketball team and serves as the captain of the U23 team.

Çetingöz became paralyzed in his right leg as a result of polio, which he contracted at the age of four. He began playing wheelchair basketball at the age of fourteen in a disabled sports club in Şanlıurfa.

After playing for eight years for Şanlıurfa Wheelchair, he was transferred in August 2013 to Beşiktaş JK, which competes in the Turkish Wheelchair Basketball Super League.

Çetingöz became champion with the national junior team at the 5th Fazza International Wheelchair Basketball Championships held from April 17 to 23, 2013 in Dubai and was named Top Scorer.

== Awards ==
=== Individual ===
- 5th Fazza International Wheelchair Basketball Championships - "Top Scorer"

=== National team ===
- 5th Fazza International Wheelchair Basketball Championships - (gold) with national junior team
