= International Wheelchair Basketball Federation =

Governing body for wheelchair basketball

Wheelchair Basketball
- Highest governing body: ISMGF (1956–1989); ISMGF & IWBF (1989–1993); IWBF (1993–present)

Characteristics
- Mixed-sex: No
- Type: Indoor

Presence
- Paralympic: 1960

The International Wheelchair Basketball Federation (IWBF) is the international governing body for wheelchair basketball. The IWBF is recognized by the International Paralympic Committee (IPC) as the sole competent authority in wheelchair basketball worldwide. The International Basketball Federation (FIBA) recognizes the IWBF under Article 53 of its General Statutes.

== History ==
The Stoke Mandeville Wheelchair Games, held in 1947, were the first games to be held and included only a handful of participants (26), and few events (shot put, javelin, club throw, and archery). The number of wheelchair events and participants grew quickly. Wheelchair netball was introduced in the 1948 Games. In 1952, a team from the Netherlands was invited to compete with the British team. This became the first International Stoke-Mandeville Games (ISMG), an event that has been held annually ever since. Wheelchair basketball, as we know it now, was first played at the 1956 International Stoke-Mandeville Games. The US "Pan Am Jets" team won the tournament.

In 1973, the International Stoke Mandeville Games Federation (ISMGF) established the first Sub-section for wheelchair basketball. At that time ISMGF was the world governing body for all wheelchair sports. In 1989, ISMGF accepted the name International Wheelchair Basketball Federation (IWBF) for its former sub-section. With this step wheelchair basketball began its journey for full independence and in 1993 IWBF was established as the world body for wheelchair basketball with full responsibility for development of the sport. Over the next five years IWBF membership grew in size and the federation configured itself into 4 geographical zones.

== Variants ==
- 3x3 – Introduced in 2021.
- 5x5 – Standard competitive format.

== Members ==
=== Zones ===
IWBF studied several models before creating its current zone structure. Based on the number of National Organizations for Wheelchair Basketball (NOWB) with active programs at the national and international level it was decided that IWBF Americas and IWBF Europe could be the same as FIBA Americas and FIBA Europe. However, because of the limited number of countries with active programs in the rest of the world, IWBF chose to combine some regions to create better developmental and competitive opportunities within the zone. As a result, the last two zones of IWBF (2005) are IWBF Asia Oceania and IWBF Africa.

Before 2007 or 2005 Africa and west asian in one zone and east asia with oceania in one zone.

111 Members in August 2025:

4 Zones:

1. IWBF Americas - Americas Wheelchair Basketball Championship - 20 Members
2. IWBF Europe - European Wheelchair Basketball Championship - 35 Members
3. IWBF Asia Oceania - Asia Oceania Wheelchair Basketball Championships - 26 Members
4. IWBF Africa - Africa Wheelchair Basketball Championship - 17 Members

== National Members ==
As of 2003, IWBF has 76 NOWB actively participating in wheelchair basketball throughout the world with this number increasing each year. As of 2021, IWBF has 95 NOWB actively participating in wheelchair basketball throughout the world with this number increasing each year. 98 in May 2022.

1. IWBF Asia Oceania 26
2. IWBF Africa 17
3. IWBF America 20
4. IWBF Euro 35

=== IWBF Asia Oceania ===
1. Afghanistan
2. Australia
3. Bahrain
4. Cambodia
5. China
6. Chinese Taipei
7. Hong Kong
8. Indonesia
9. India
10. Iran
11. Iraq
12. Japan
13. Jordan
14. Korea
15. Kuwait
16. Lebanon
17. Malaysia
18. Nepal
19. New Zealand
20. Oman
21. Palestine
22. Philippines
23. Saudi Arabia
24. Singapore
25. Thailand
26. United Arab Emirates

=== Africa ===
1. Algeria
2. Angola
3. Burkina Faso
4. Central African Republic
5. Egypt
6. Ethiopia
7. Gambia
8. Kenya
9. Liberia
10. Morocco
11. Namibia
12. Nigeria
13. Rwanda
14. South Africa
15. Tanzania
16. Uganda

=== America ===
1. Argentina
2. Bolivia
3. Brazil
4. Canada
5. Chile
6. Colombia
7. Costa Rica
8. Dominican Republic
9. Ecuador
10. El Salvador
11. Guatemala
12. Honduras
13. Mexico
14. Nicaragua
15. Panama
16. Peru
17. Puerto Rico
18. Uruguay
19. USA
20. Venezuela

=== Euro ===
1. Armenia
2. Austria
3. Belgium
4. Bosnia & Herzegovina
5. Bulgaria
6. Croatia
7. Cyprus
8. Czech Republic
9. Denmark
10. Finland
11. France
12. Germany
13. Great Britain
14. Greece
15. Hungary
16. Ireland
17. Israel
18. Italy
19. Latvia
20. Lithuania
21. Malta
22. Netherlands
23. Norway
24. Poland
25. Portugal
26. Romania
27. Russia
28. Serbia
29. Slovak Republic
30. Slovenia
31. Spain
32. Sweden
33. Switzerland
34. Turkey
35. Ukraine

== Executive Council ==
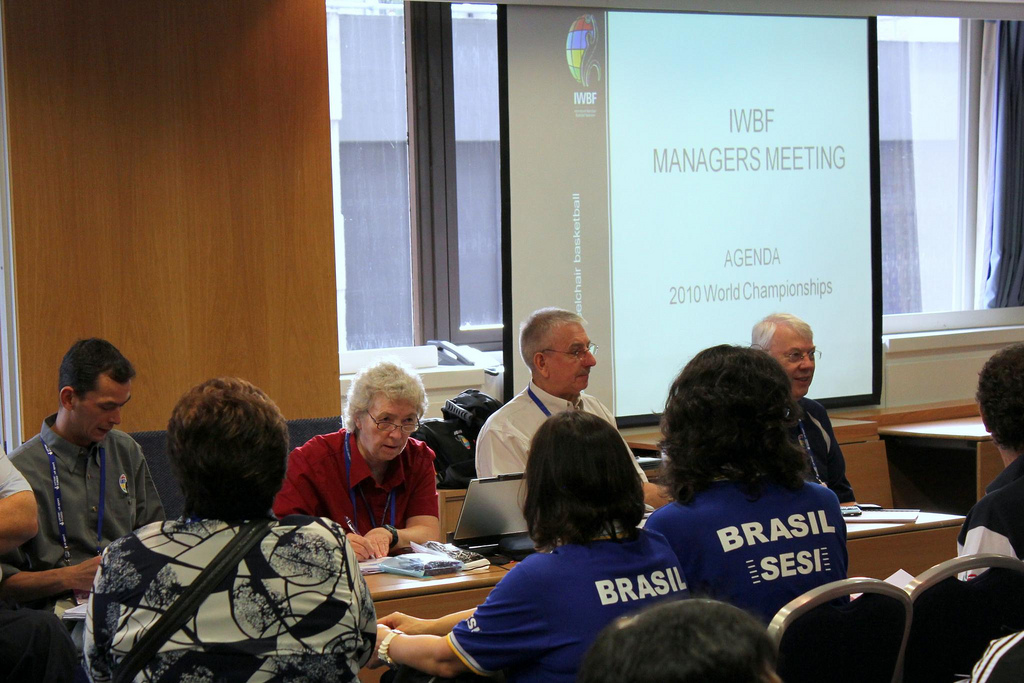
IWBF President Maureen Orchard leads the team managers' meeting, 2010

IWBF is governed by an Executive Council that is elected at the World Congress every four years. Philip Craven (Great Britain) who had served as Chairperson of the ISMGF wheelchair basketball Section since 1988 was elected in 1993 as the first President of IWBF.

In 2001, Brendan Hancock was elected to the position of President of the International Paralympic Committee (IPC) and retired as president of IWBF at the World Congress in 2002. Maureen Orchard (Canada) was elected as only the second president of IWBF at that same World Congress in Kitakyushu, Japan in 2002.

== Classification ==
To ensure fair competition, each player is assigned a classification point value based on functional ability, ranging from 1.0 (greatest physical impairment) to 4.5 (least physical impairment).

Individuals who perform classification are known as classifiers. Classifiers hold Bronze, Silver, or Gold certification levels based on training and experience. Recently the classification rules made changes and have only two levels, namely the national classifier, the zone classifier and the International Classifier.

Don Perriman (Australia) is the current President of Classification Commission

Kenneth McKay (Great Britain)

Gold Classifier

Gholamhossein Shahrabadi (Iran)

Gold Classifier

Toufic Allouch (Lebanon)

== Wheelchair basketball national organizations around the world ==
Wheelchair basketball national organizations have developed in a variety of ways. Most started out the same way as IWBF, as a sub-section of a national wheelchair sport organization. As IWBF matured so did many of its member organizations and now there are several models that IWBF embraces within its membership. In Mexico the wheelchair basketball organizations are a part of their National Paralympic Committee(NPC). Australia is part of the Australian Wheelchair Athletes Ltd., and others are under the umbrella of a National Disabled Federation such as Bahrain who are part of the Bahrain Disabled Sports Federation. In the Netherlands wheelchair basketball is fully integrated into the Nederlandse Basketball Bond and in Canada the Canadian Wheelchair Basketball Association is fully independent. In all cases where a member is part of a larger federation the IWBF only recognizes the part of that federation responsible for wheelchair basketball.

== Member organizations ==
- Canadian Wheelchair Basketball Association
- US - National Wheelchair Basketball Association
- Australian Wheelchair Athletes Ltd.
- Mexican - National National Paralympic Committee
- Bahrain Disabled Sports Federation
- Holland - Nederlandse Basketball Bond
- Malaysia men's national wheelchair basketball team
- Islamic Republic of Iran Sports Federation for the Disabled

== Events ==
International

- Wheelchair Basketball World Championship
- Wheelchair basketball at the Summer Paralympics

Continental

- Africa Wheelchair Basketball Championship
- Wheelchair basketball at the Asian Para Games
- European Wheelchair Basketball Championship
- Wheelchair basketball at the 2023 European Para Championships

Other tournaments

- Kitakyushu Champions Cup
- 2015, 2017, 2022, 2023 ASEAN Para Games

Clubs

- IWBF Champions Cup
- EuroCup 1
- EuroCup 2
- EuroCup 3

Youth

- IWBF U23 World Wheelchair Basketball Championship
- IWBF Africa U23 African Championship
