= Wheelchair netball =

Type of sport adapted for play in wheelchairs

Wheelchair netball is a variation of netball adapted for play in wheelchairs. It can be played by both people with and without disabilities.

== History ==
A hybrid version of basketball and netball was introduced at the Grand Festival of Paraplegic Sport in 1949. Six teams composed of 37 athletes competed at the event. This hybrid version of netball was played at every year's festival until 1954; it was replaced by wheelchair basketball in 1956.

Modern versions of wheelchair netball are similar to standard netball, but with modified rules regarding contact, obstruction and travelling.
