= IWBF U23 World Wheelchair Basketball Championship =

International wheelchair basketball competition

- Sport: Wheelchair basketball
- Founded: 1997
- Country: IWBF members
- Continent: IWBF (International)
- Most recent champion: Germany (2025)
- Most titles: (2) United States, Canada, Germany

The IWBF U23 World Wheelchair Basketball Championship is an international wheelchair basketball competition contested by the men's and women's under-23 national teams of the members of the International Wheelchair Basketball Federation (IWBF), the sport's global governing body. The event is held every four years.

The first official wheelchair basketball world championship for men under-23 was held in 1997 hosted by Toronto, Canada. Only seven nations took part at the tournament. At the next championship held 2001 in Blumenau, Santa Catarina, Brazil, the number of participating nations were six. The 2005 Championship in Birmingham, United Kingdom became a full tournament attended by twelve nations from four zones.

Junior women under 23 were allowed to play in the men's teams at the third edition of championships in 2005. A bonus of one point was given to the team, which had a female player on the court. However, to develop young women players, it is concluded that separate championships for junior women will be held in the future.

== Winners ==
National teams of Canada and the United States are both twice champions sofar.

Number	Year	Host	1st place, gold medalist(s)	2nd place, silver medalist(s)	3rd place, bronze medalist(s)
1	1997	Canada, Toronto	Canada	United States	Australia
2	2001	Brazil, Blumenau, Santa Catarina	Canada	Brazil	United States
3	2005	United Kingdom, Birmingham	United States	Japan	Australia
4	2009	France, Paris	United States	Spain	Japan
5	2013	Turkey, Adana	Germany	Sweden	Australia
6	2017	Canada, Toronto	Great Britain	Turkey	Australia
7	2022	Thailand, Phuket	Japan	Turkey	Spain
8	2025	Brazil, São Paulo	Germany	Turkey	Great Britain

== Medal table ==
Rank	Country	1st place, gold medalist(s)	2nd place, silver medalist(s)	3rd place, bronze medalist(s)	Total
1	United States	2	1	1	4
2	Canada	2	0	0	2
3	Germany	2	0	0	2
3	Great Britain	1	0	1	2
4	Japan	1	1	1	3
5	Brazil	0	1	0	1
5	Spain	0	1	1	2
5	Sweden	0	1	0	1
5	Turkey	0	3	0	3
9	Australia	0	0	4	4
Total		6	6	6	16

== See also ==
- 2009 Man’s U23 Wheelchair Basketball World Championship in Paris
- 2011 Women's U25 Wheelchair Basketball World Championship
- 2015 Women's U25 Wheelchair Basketball World Championship
- 2019 Women's U25 Wheelchair Basketball World Championship
- 2023 Women's U25 Wheelchair Basketball World Championship
