= Yüreğir Serinevler Arena =

Multi-sport indoor arena in Adana, Turkey

Yüreğir Serinevler Arena Yüreğir Serinevler Spor Salonu
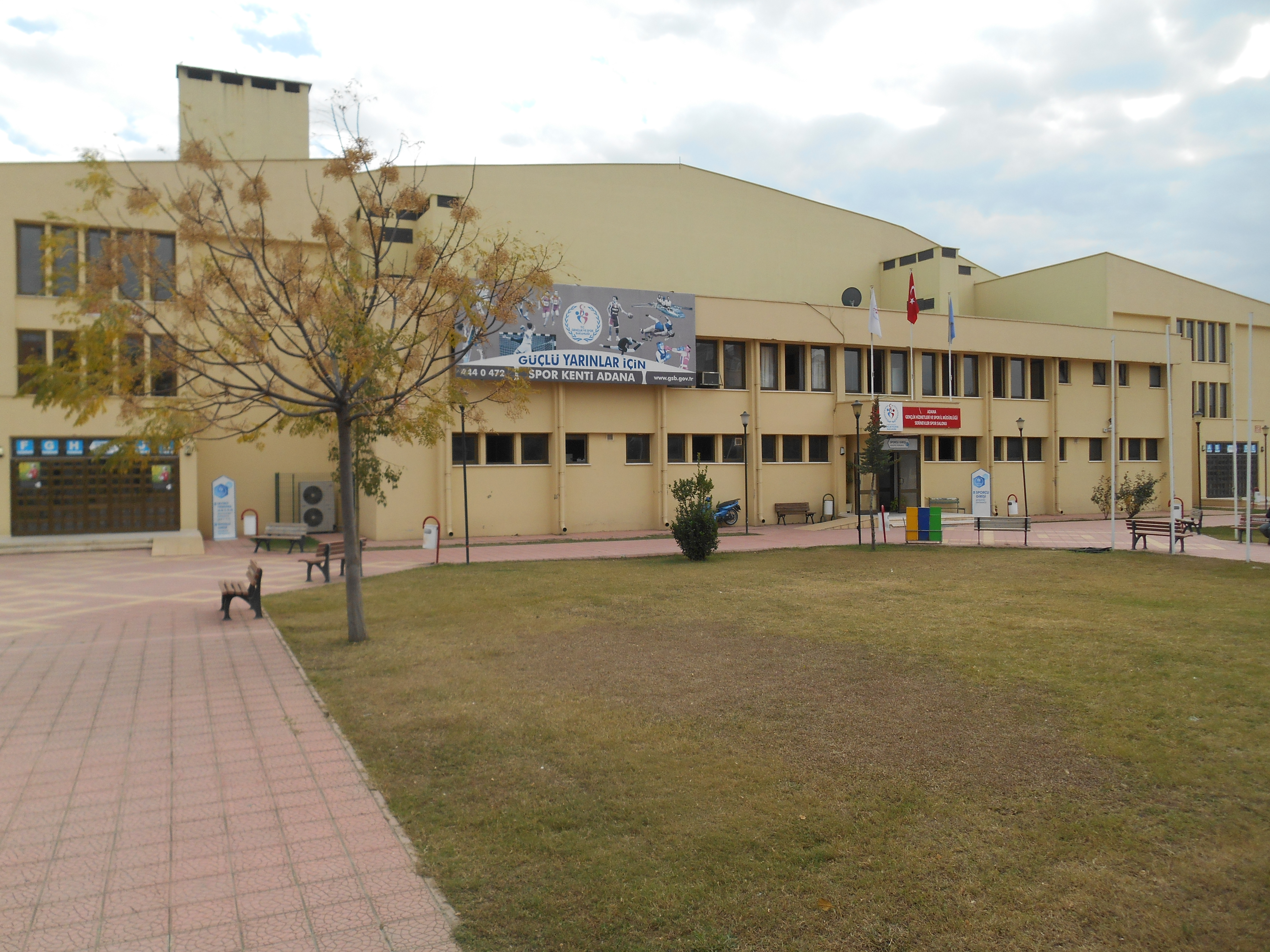
- Interactive map of Yüreğir Serinevler Arena; Yüreğir Serinevler Spor Salonu
- Location: Serinevler, Yüreğir, Adana
- Coordinates: 37°00′13″N 35°21′30″E
- Owner: Republic of Turkey
- Operator: Adana Youth and Sports Directorate
- Capacity: Basketball: 2,500

Construction
- Opened: 2003

Tenants
- Şakirpaşa HEM; Adana Martı Engelliler Wheelchair Basketball; Adana Engelliler Wheelchair Basketball

The Yüreğir Serinevler Arena (Turkish: Yüreğir Serinevler Spor Salonu) is a multi-sport indoor arena located at the Serinevler neighbourhood, in the Yüreğir district of the city of Adana. It has a seating capacity of 2,500.

It hosts national and international sports events such as basketball, volleyball, handball and wrestling. The facility contains two wall mounted scoreboards, two locker rooms, a press room, a cafeteria and VIP lounge.

The wheelchair basketball teams of Adana Martı Engelliler Sports Club and Adana Engelliler Sports Club play their Turkish League home matches in the sports hall. Women's volleyball team of Şakirpaşa HEM plays some of their games here.

== Major events ==
The finals of the 2007 IWBF European Wheelchair Basketball Championship were played in the venue. The 2008 IWBF European Wheelchair Basketball U22 Championship was held at the Yüreğir Serinevler Arena. In 2009, the IWBF European Championship competitions were played in the arena. On June 12, 2013, Turkey men's national handball team play their home match against the Norwegian team in the Group 3 of 2014 European Men's Handball Championship qualification. During the 2013 Mediterranean Games, the venue hosted women's handball competitions between 22 and 29 June. From September 7 to 14, the 2013 IWBF Men's U23 Wheelchair Basketball World Championship will be held in the arena.
