= Wheelchair basketball =

Basketball played by people in wheelchairs

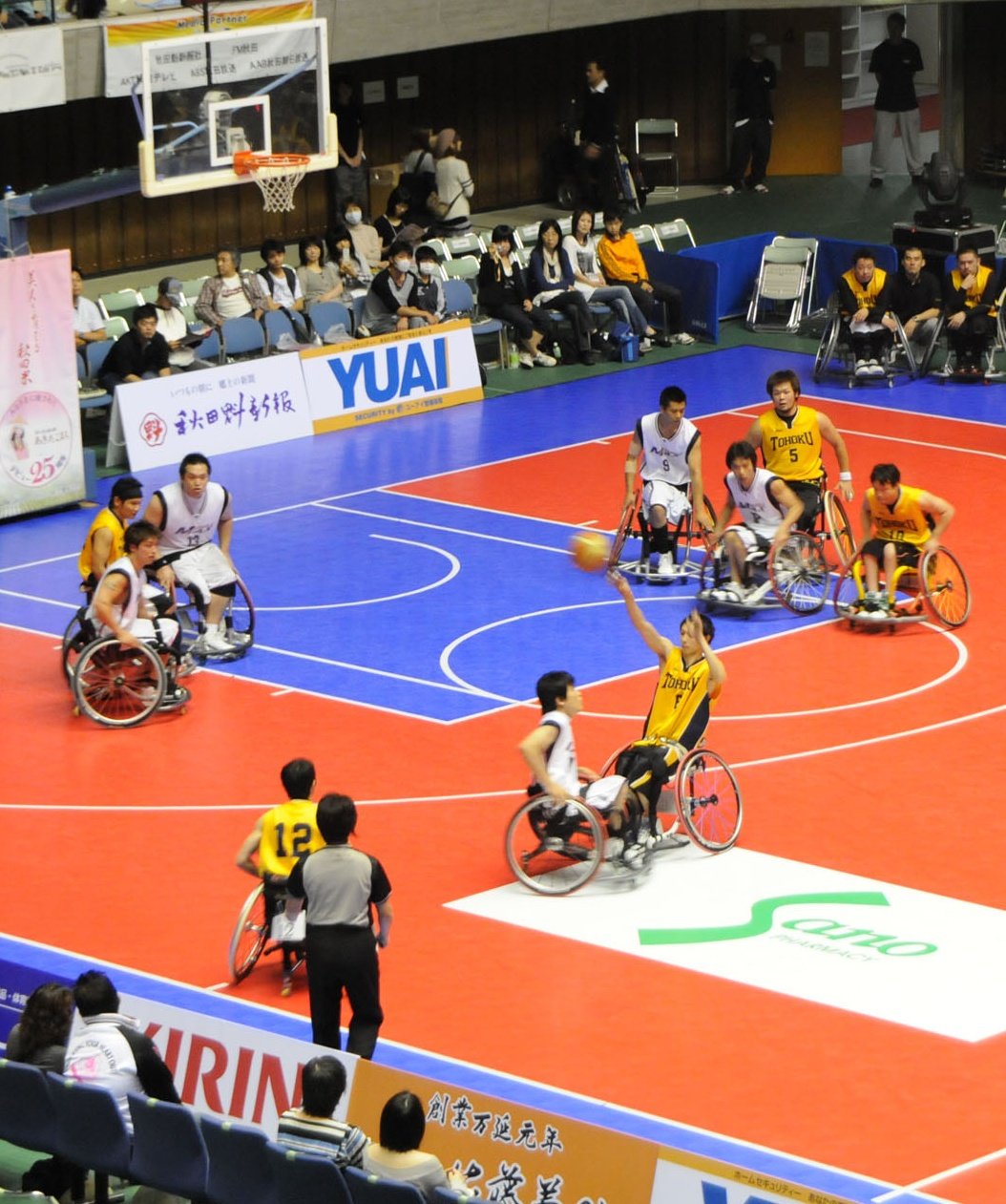
- Highest governing body: 1. ISMGF (1956-1973) No Organ; 2. ISMGF (1973-1989); 3. ISMGF and IWBF (1989-1993); 4. IWBF (1993-present)

Characteristics
- Mixed-sex: No
- Type: Indoor

Presence
- Paralympic: 1960

Wheelchair basketball is a style of basketball played using a sports wheelchair. The International Wheelchair Basketball Federation (IWBF) is the governing body for this sport. It is recognized by the International Paralympic Committee (IPC) as the sole competent authority in wheelchair basketball worldwide. FIBA has recognized IWBF under Article 53 of its General Statutes.

The IWBF has 95 National Organizations for Wheelchair Basketball (NOWBs) participating in wheelchair basketball throughout the world, with this number increasing each year. It is estimated that more than 100,000 people play wheelchair basketball from recreation to club play and as elite national team members.

Wheelchair basketball is included in the Paralympic Games. The Wheelchair Basketball World Championship is played two years after every Paralympic Games. Major competition in wheelchair basketball comes from Canada, Australia, the United States, Great Britain, the Netherlands, and Japan.

== History ==
=== 1940s to 1960s ===
In 1944, Ludwig Guttmann, through the rehabilitation program at the Stoke Mandeville Hospital, in Aylesbury, Buckinghamshire, England, adapted existing sports to use wheelchairs. It was known as wheelchair netball.

At around the same time, starting from 1946, wheelchair basketball games were played, primarily between American World War II disabled veterans. It was a way for them to rehabilitate, socialize, become more physically active, and improve in skills such as coordination and communication. In the United States, it began at the University of Illinois. Dr. Timothy Nugent founded the National Wheelchair Basketball Association in 1949 and served as commissioner for its first 25 years.

The Stoke Mandeville Wheelchair Games, held in 1947, were the first games to be held, with just 26 participants in four events (shot put, javelin, club throw, and archery).

The number of wheelchair events and participants grew quickly. Wheelchair netball was introduced in the 1948 Games. In 1952, a team from the Netherlands was invited to compete with the British team. This became the first International Stoke-Mandeville Games (ISMG), an event that has been held annually ever since.

Wheelchair basketball, as it is known now, was first played at the 1955 International Stoke-Mandeville Games, where wheelchair basketball came to Europe after inviting the US team for a game. The US "Pan Am Jets" team won the tournament and their performance inspired the shift from wheelchair netball to wheelchair basketball for future Games. Wheelchair basketball has featured at every edition of the Paralympic Games starting with Rome 1960 where 96 athletes (95 men and one woman) representing 12 countries competed in two medal events. Paris 2024 Paralympics achieved gender parity in the sport with 192 athletes (96 men and 96 women) from 10 countries across two medal competitions. USA is the most decorated nation in wheelchair basketball at the Paralympic Games, having won ten gold medals in the men’s category and four in the women’s category.

=== 1970s to present ===
Wheelchair basketball at the University of Worcester, England (video)

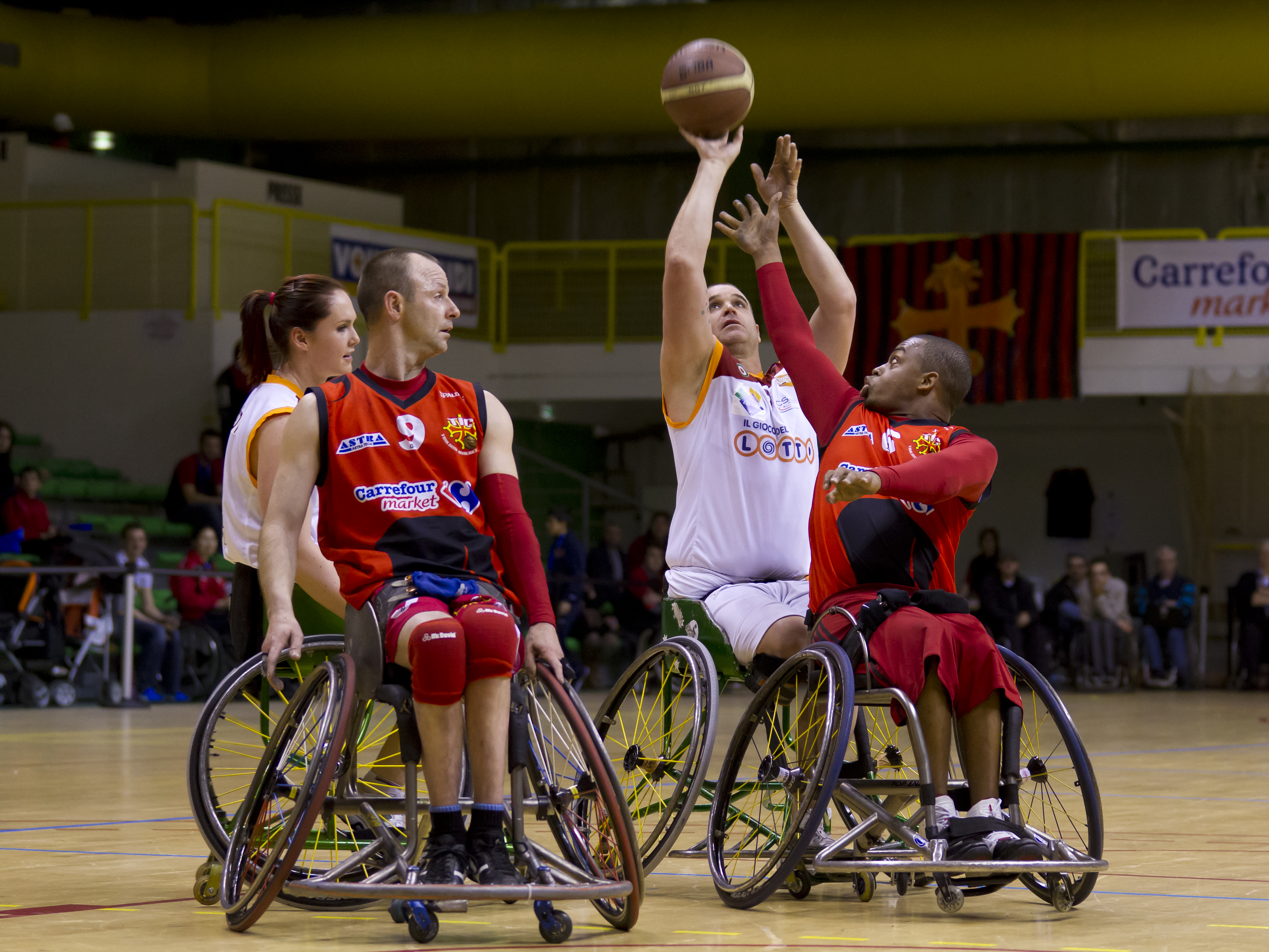
Competitors in the 2012 Euroleague tournament

In 1973, the International Stoke Mandeville Games Federation (ISMGF) established the first sub-section for wheelchair basketball. At that time, ISMGF was the world governing body for all wheelchair sports.

In 1989, ISMGF accepted that its former wheelchair basketball sub-section would be known as the International Wheelchair Basketball Federation (IWBF).

Full independence came in 1993 with the IWBF becoming the world body for wheelchair basketball with full responsibility for development of the sport. Over the following years, IWBF membership grew in size, and based on the number of National Organizations for Wheelchair Basketball (NOWBs) with active programs, the international federation configured itself into four geographical zones: Africa, Americas, Asia/Oceania and Europe.

=== Wheelchair Basketball World Championship ===
World championships for the sport have been held since 1973, with Bruges, Belgium being the first host city. Great Britain won the first world championship for men. Of the first 11 men's world championships, six were won by the United States (1979, 1983, 1986, 1994, 1998, 2002), two were won by Great Britain (1973, 2018), two were won by Australia (2010, 2014); and once by Israel (1975), France (1990) and Canada (2006). Canada has won five of the women's world championship titles (1994, 1998, 2002, 2006, 2014), the United States two (1990, 2010) and the Netherlands one (2018).

== Rules ==
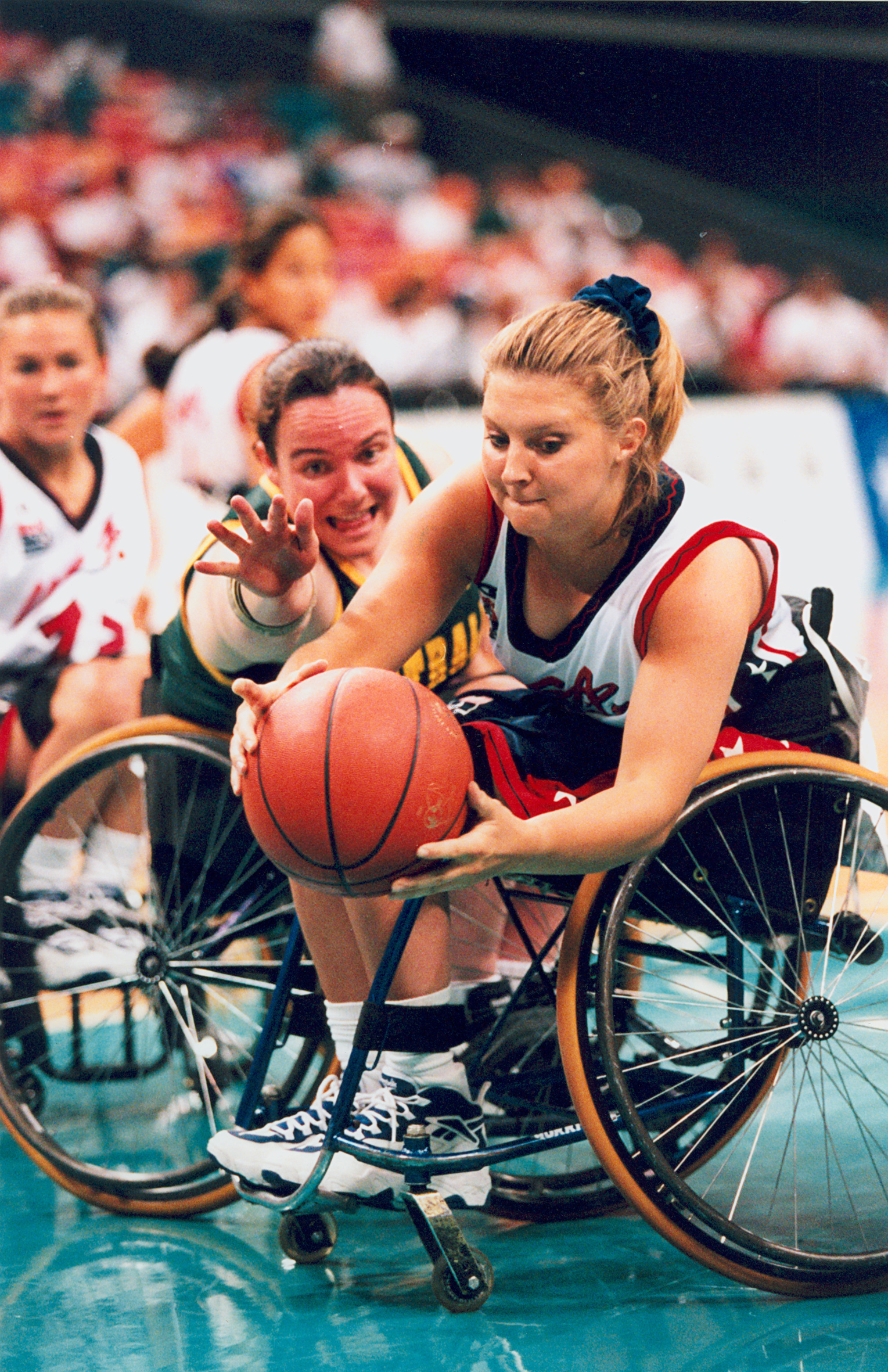
Australian women's wheelchair basketballer Amanda Carter challenging for the ball in a game against the US at the 1996 Atlanta Paralympic Games

Wheelchair basketball retains most major rules and scoring of basketball, and maintains a 10-foot basketball hoop and standard basketball court. The exceptions are rules which have been modified with consideration for the wheelchair. For example, "travelling" in wheelchair basketball occurs when the athlete touches their wheels more than twice after receiving or dribbling the ball. The individual must pass, bounce, or shoot the ball before touching the wheels again.

In some countries, such as Canada, Australia, and England, non-disabled athletes using wheelchairs are allowed to compete alongside other athletes on mixed teams.

=== Classifications ===
Classification is an international regulation for playing wheelchair basketball to harmonize players' different levels of disabilities. All teams which compete above a recreational level use the classification system to evaluate the functional abilities of players on a point scale of 1 to 4.5. Minimally disabled athletes are classified as a 4.5, and an individual with the highest degree of disability (such as a paraplegic with a complete injury below the chest) would be classified as a 1.0. Competitions restrict the number of points allowable on the court at one time. The five players from each team on the court during play may not exceed a total of 14 points. In places where teams are integrated, non-disabled athletes compete as either a 4.5 in Canada or a 5.0 in Europe; however, non-disabled athletes are not allowed to compete internationally.

=== Basketball chair design ===
Basketball wheelchairs are designed for enhanced stability. The center of gravity is where the chair and the athlete's mass are equally distributed in all directions. Points at which the wheelchair can tip over sideways are the fulcrum. A wheelchair with a higher seat is easier to tip. Basketball chairs have lower seats and wheels that are angled outward so that the center of gravity has to move a greater distance before it passes over the fulcrum and tips the chair. Guards use wheelchairs different from those of centers and forwards. Forwards and centers are typically under the net, so their chairs have higher seats and therefore less stability, but the height increases the player's reach for shots at the hoop and for rebounds. Guards have lower seats and therefore greater stability for ball handling and getting down the court as quickly as possible.

=== Wheelchair 3x3 ===
Wheelchair 3x3 started in 2019.

== In other media ==
- Takehiko Inoue wrote and illustrated a manga series about the sport, titled Real, which first appeared in Weekly Young Jump in 1999.
- In 2025, Nintendo released an online multiplayer wheelchair basketball video game called Drag x Drive for the Nintendo Switch 2, utilizing its innovative motion controls to physically simulate the sport, such as using dual-wielded backward-dragging motions of the Joy-Con 2's mouse functionality for forward wheelchair rolling.

== See also ==
- Wheelchair basketball at the Summer Paralympics
- Wheelchair Basketball World Championship
- IWBF U23 World Wheelchair Basketball Championship
- Basketball ID at the 2000 Summer Paralympics
- European Wheelchair Basketball Championship
- Africa Wheelchair Basketball Championship
- Asia Oceania Zone (AOZ) Wheelchair Basketball Championship
- Pan American Wheelchair Basketball Championship
