= Salmanbeyli =

Salmanbeyli is a Turkic place name. It may refer to:

- Salmanbəyli, a village and municipality in the Aghjabadi Rayon, Azerbaijan
- Salmanbeyli, Seyhan, a village in the district of Seyhan, Adana Province, Turkey
