= Gençlik Stadium =

Football stadium in Reşatbey, Adana

Coordinates: 36°59′56″N 35°19′52″E

Gençlik Stadı
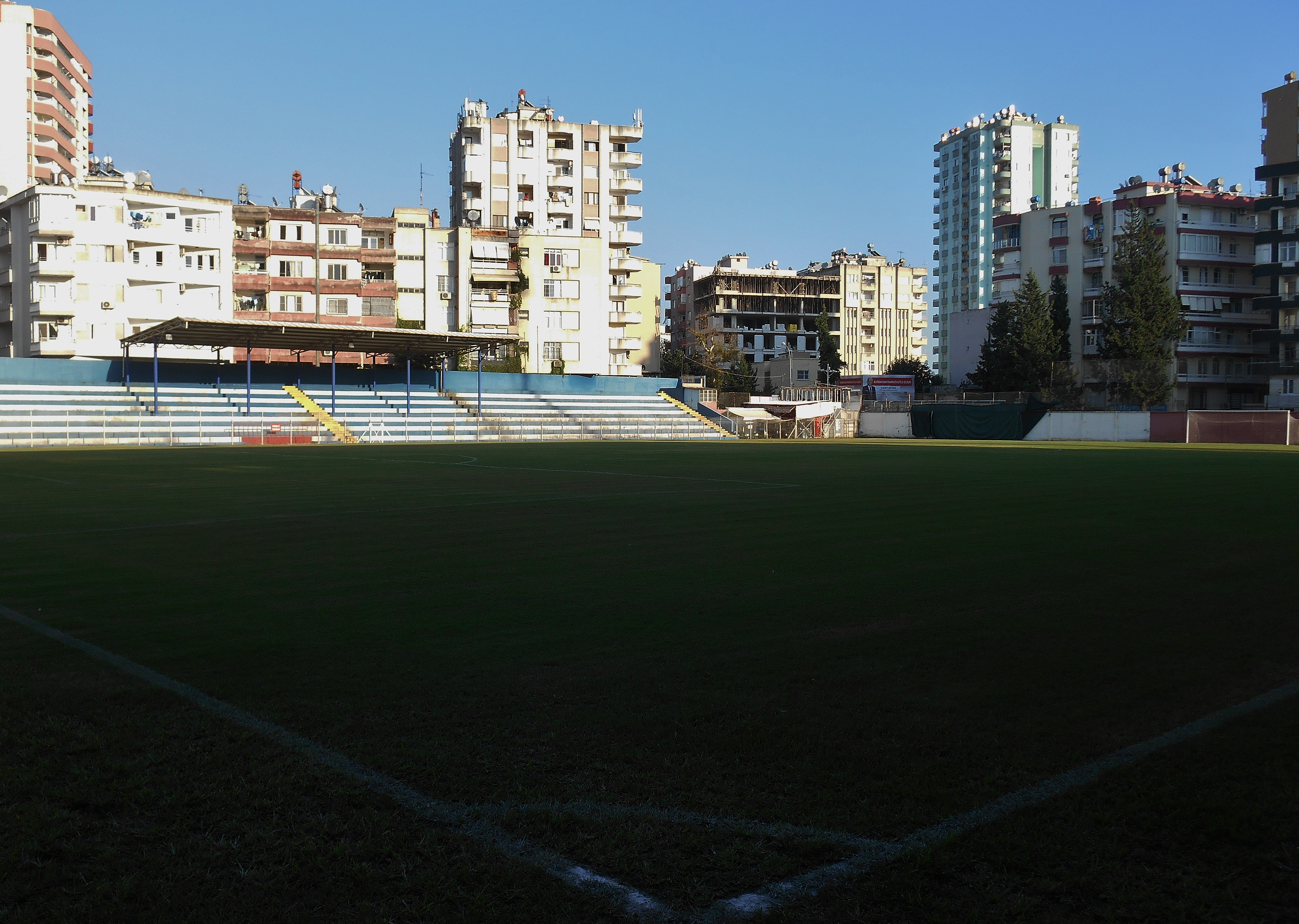
- Interactive map of Gençlik Stadı
- Location: Reşatbey, Seyhan; Adana, Turkey
- Owner: Republic of Turkey
- Operator: Adana Youth Services and Sports Directorate
- Capacity: 2,000
- Surface: Grass

Construction
- Opened: 1938

Tenants
- Adana İdmanyurdu; Seyhan Belediyespor

Gençlik Stadium (Turkish: Gençlik Stadı) is a football stadium in the Reşatbey neighborhood of the city of Adana. The stadium is opened in 1938, together with the 5 Ocak Stadium and the Menderes Sports Hall, as a sports complex. The stadium has a capacity of 2000 spectators with an only East Stand. Player change rooms are under the East Stand of 5 Ocak Stadium at the west side of the Gençlik Stadium.

The stadium is currently used for football matches only, and it is the home ground of Adana İdmanyurdu women's and the Seyhan Belediyespor men's football teams.
