= Dervişler =

Dervişler (literally "dervishes") is a Turkic word that may refer to:

- Dərvişlər, a village and municipality in the Sharur District, Nakhchivan Autonomous Republic, Azerbaijan
- Dervişler, Seyhan, a village in the district of Seyhan, Adana Province, Turkey
