= Pargais =

Settlement and station (mutatio) of ancient Cilicia

Coordinates: 36°58′17″N 35°06′22″E

Pargais was a settlement and station (mutatio) of ancient Cilicia, on the road between Adana and Tarsus, inhabited during Byzantine times.

Its site is located near Gökçeler in Asiatic Turkey.
