= 1972 Adana Turkish Airlines DC-9 crash =

1972 aviation accident in Turkey

Coordinates: 37.014°N 35.230°E

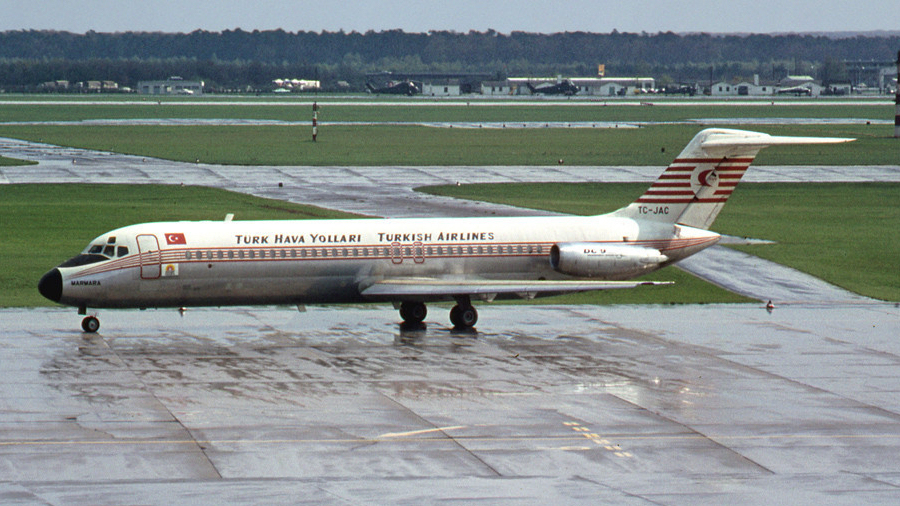
- TC-JAC, the aircraft involved in the accident, seen in 1970

Accident
- Date: 21 January 1972
- Summary: Controlled flight into terrain
- Site: Near Adana Airport, Turkey

Aircraft
- Aircraft type: Douglas DC-9-32
- Aircraft name: Marmara
- Operator: Turkish Airlines
- Registration: TC-JAC
- Flight origin: Kandara Airport, Jeddah, Saudi Arabia
- Stopover: Damascus Airport, Damascus, Syria
- Destination: Ankara Esenboğa Airport, Ankara, Turkey
- Occupants: 5
- Passengers: 0
- Crew: 5
- Fatalities: 1
- Injuries: 4
- Survivors: 4

On 21 January 1972, a McDonnell Douglas DC-9-32 operated by Turkish Airlines crashed on approach while making an emergency landing at Adana Airport. The aircraft was en-route from Kandara Airport in Jeddah, Saudi Arabia, to Esenboğa Airport in Ankara, Turkey, with a stopover at Damascus Airport in Syria. There were only five crew members on board as the aircraft was being repositioned after carrying passengers to Hajj the day before. After taking off from Damascus for the second leg of the flight, the plane experienced technical problems and attempted to divert to Adana. The pilots decided to go-around during the first landing attempt due to poor visibility. During the second attempt, the plane flew too low and crashed in a field 6 kilometres (3.7 mi) away from the airport, and subsequently caught fire. One of the five crew members died in the flames, while four others were injured.

== Aircraft and crew ==
The aircraft was a McDonnell Douglas DC-9-32 with serial number 47213/358, registered as TC-JAC, and named Marmara; it was manufactured in 1968. Two days prior to the accident, on 19 January, the plane carried the 13th Prime Minister of Turkey Nihat Erim and a delegation from Ankara to Paris, France, and was due to bring them back later on the day of the accident. Before the prime minister boarded the aircraft, it underwent an "extensive technical control" and its interior was searched for explosives with detectors.

On board the flight deck were Captain Mahzar İpek, aged 46, and First Officer Celâlettin Yeprem, aged 51. Both had been flying with the airline for 15 years, after leaving the Turkish Air Force in 1957. There were three cabin crew members: Nilgün Dener, Selva Aksöyek and Hülya Maviler. Maviler had also been a crew member on a Turkish Airlines flight that was hijacked to Sofia in September 1969.

== Accident ==
The aircraft was returning back to Ankara, Turkey, without passengers from Jeddah after carrying pilgrims to Hajj the night before. During the second leg of the flight towards Ankara, the pilots reported to controllers that they were experiencing technical problems with the aircraft and decided to divert to Adana Airport for an emergency landing. It was snowing at the time of the accident, a condition which was rare for Adana. Due to the poor visibility, the pilots initiated a go-around after failing to see the runway. During the second approach, the aircraft was too low on altitude and struck the ground at 04:24 local time (02:24 GMT), 6 kilometres (3.7 mi) away from the airport. The plane lost its landing gear and slid a short distance before catching fire.

== Wreckage and recovery ==
The aircraft crashed in a field near the Sarıhuğlar village close to the airport. The wreckage was scattered in a large area, with the front landing gear colliding into a stable. Cabin crew member Hülya Maviler was killed in the fire that started after impact, while co-pilot Celâlettin Yeprem was taken out of the aircraft in critical condition. The other three crew members, including captain Mahzar İpek, sustained minor injuries. Nilgün Dener, seated towards the rear, was flung out of the aircraft upon impact but did not suffer any serious injuries. Dener and locals from the village helped the other crew members near the cockpit to evacuate. Maviler was seated in the center of the cabin and could not be reached by first responders. She attempted to escape towards the rear of the aircraft but was surrounded by the smoke; her burnt body was removed from between seats. Her funeral was held in Istanbul the day after the crash. The crash is the sole fatal McDonnell Douglas DC-9 accident in the Turkish aviation history.

== Cause and aftermath ==
While being treated at the hospital in Adana, captain İpek testified that the aircraft suffered from an engine failure, and that they had lost communication with the airport shortly after declaring their emergency. After losing altitude due to the poor weather conditions and limited visibility in the night, they attempted to locate an area that seemed to be flat enough to perform an emergency landing. According to İhsan Göksaran, the assistant general director of Turkish Airlines, an initial report was sent to experts in Ankara shortly after the accident, who suspected a cabin pressurization problem.

In 1975, Gündüz Sevilgen, a member of the 15th Parliament of Turkey from the National Salvation Party, wrote several questions to the Grand National Assembly of Turkey related to Turkish Airlines, including the causes of accidents. He received a response from the Minister of Transport, Sabahattin Özbek, on 18 March. The response included a short list of causes of all Turkish Airlines crashes to date. The cause for the Adana crash in the response was:

"Not adhering to IFR limits by attempting to approach and land visually in a misty and cloudy weather."

According to a Hürriyet article from 1999, there was a malfunction in the electrical system of the aircraft. In 2020, Sözcü reported that they could not find any record of the pilots being prosecuted after the accident.
