= Seyhan Cultural Center =

Cultural complex in Adana, Turkey

Coordinates: 36°59′29″N 35°19′10″E

- Yaşar Kemal Kültür Merkezi
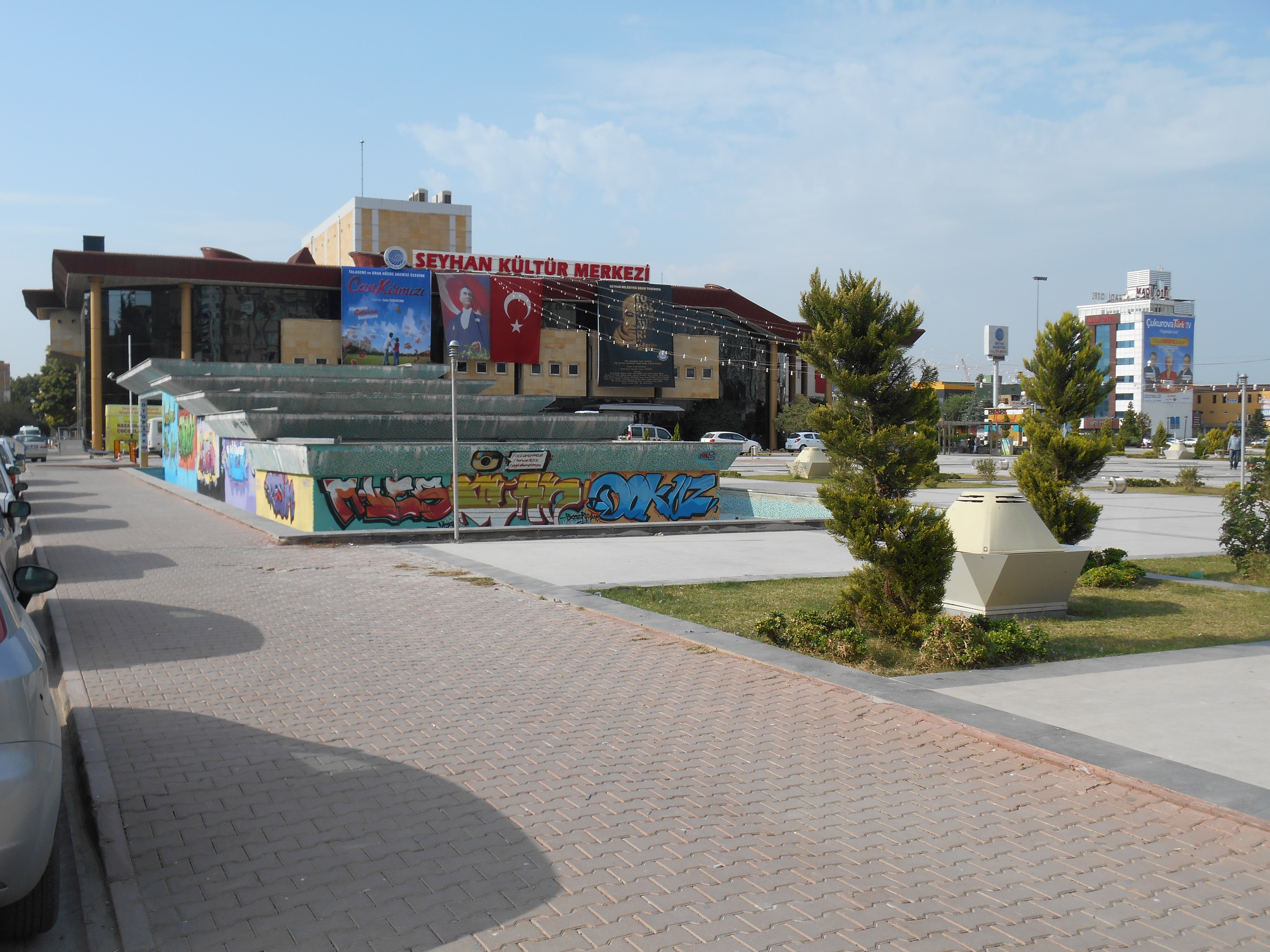
- Interactive map of Seyhan Cultural Center
- Address: İstiklal mh., Seyhan; Adana; Turkey
- Owner: Seyhan Municipality
- Capacity: 700 (large theater hall)
- Type: Cultural complex
- Current use: Theatre, Conference Hall, Exhibition Hall

Construction
- Opened: 14 May 2008

Seyhan Cultural Center (Turkish: Seyhan Kültür Merkezi), is a complex in Adana that is composed of two theatre halls, a conference hall and three exhibition halls. The center is located next to the Seyhan Municipality Hall, on D400 State Road.

On March 1, 2015, the cultural center is renamed 'Yaşar Kemal Kültür Merkezi' after the death of the legendary author Yaşar Kemal.

== The Center ==
700-seater theatre hall, 300-seater theatre hall of the Center hosts the Seyhan Town Theatre and community theater groups. Seyhan Town Theatre performs regularly here from October to May. 150-seater Conference Hall hosts conferences in the weekend and weddings during the week days.

== Gallery ==
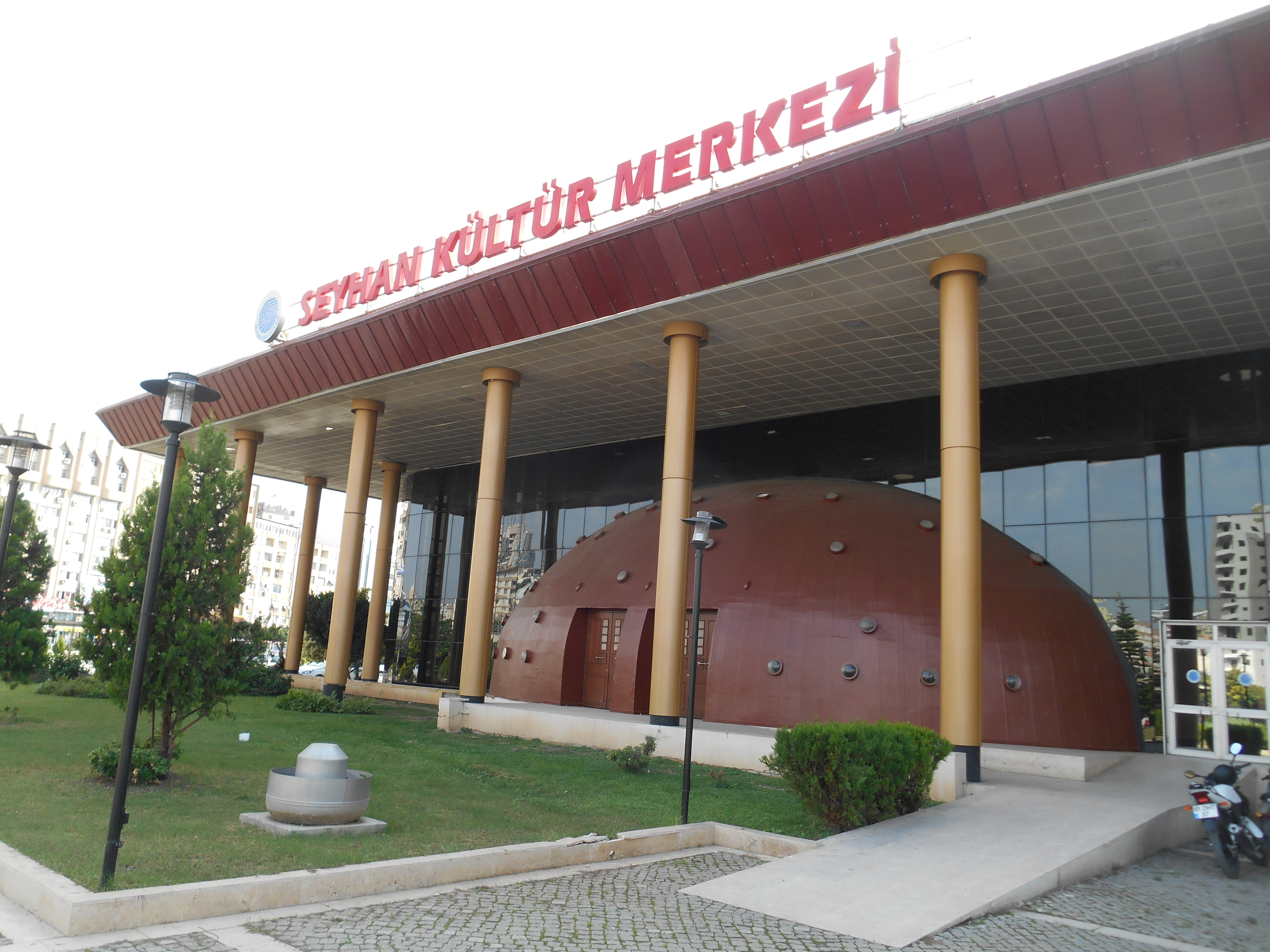

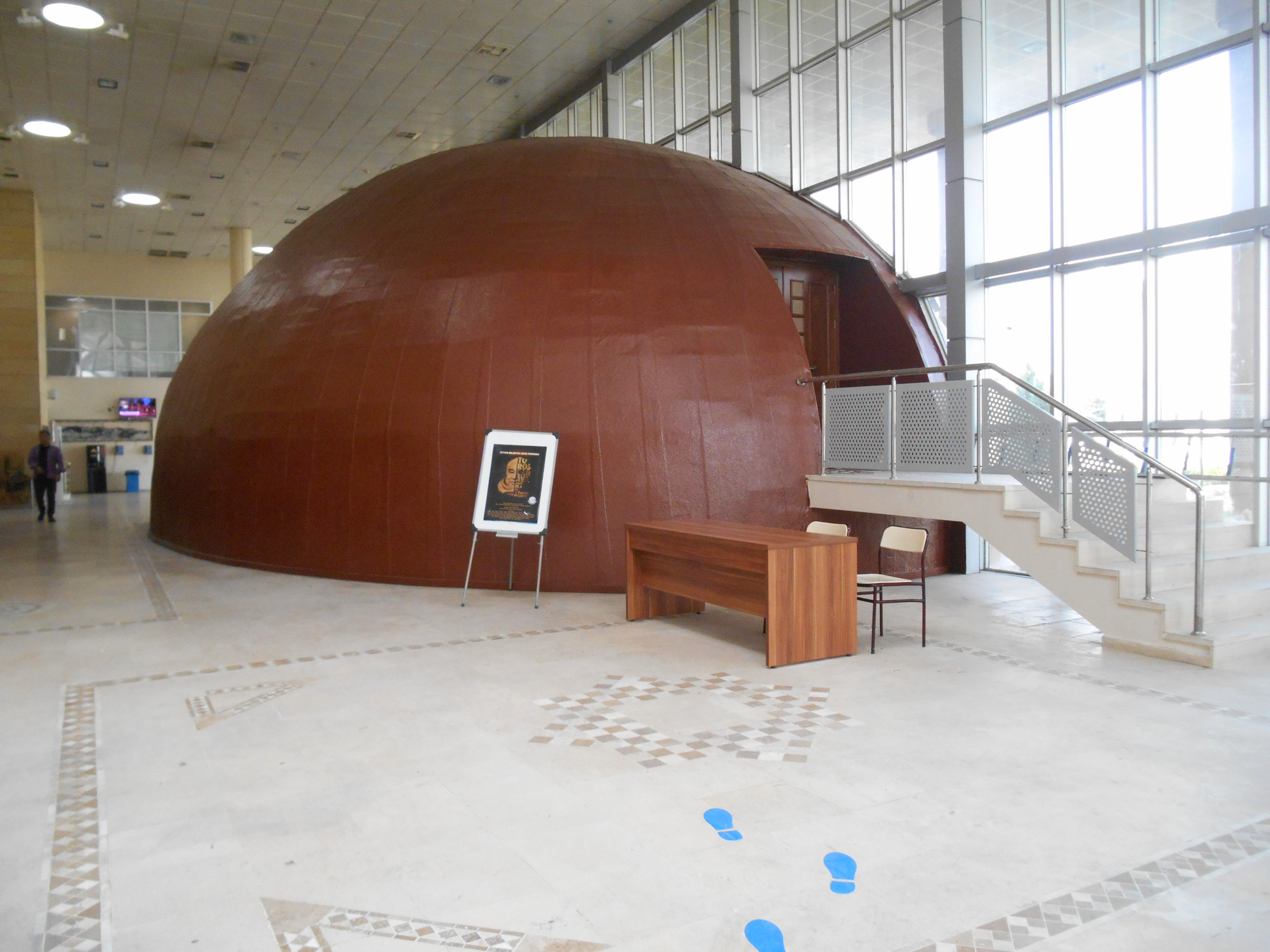

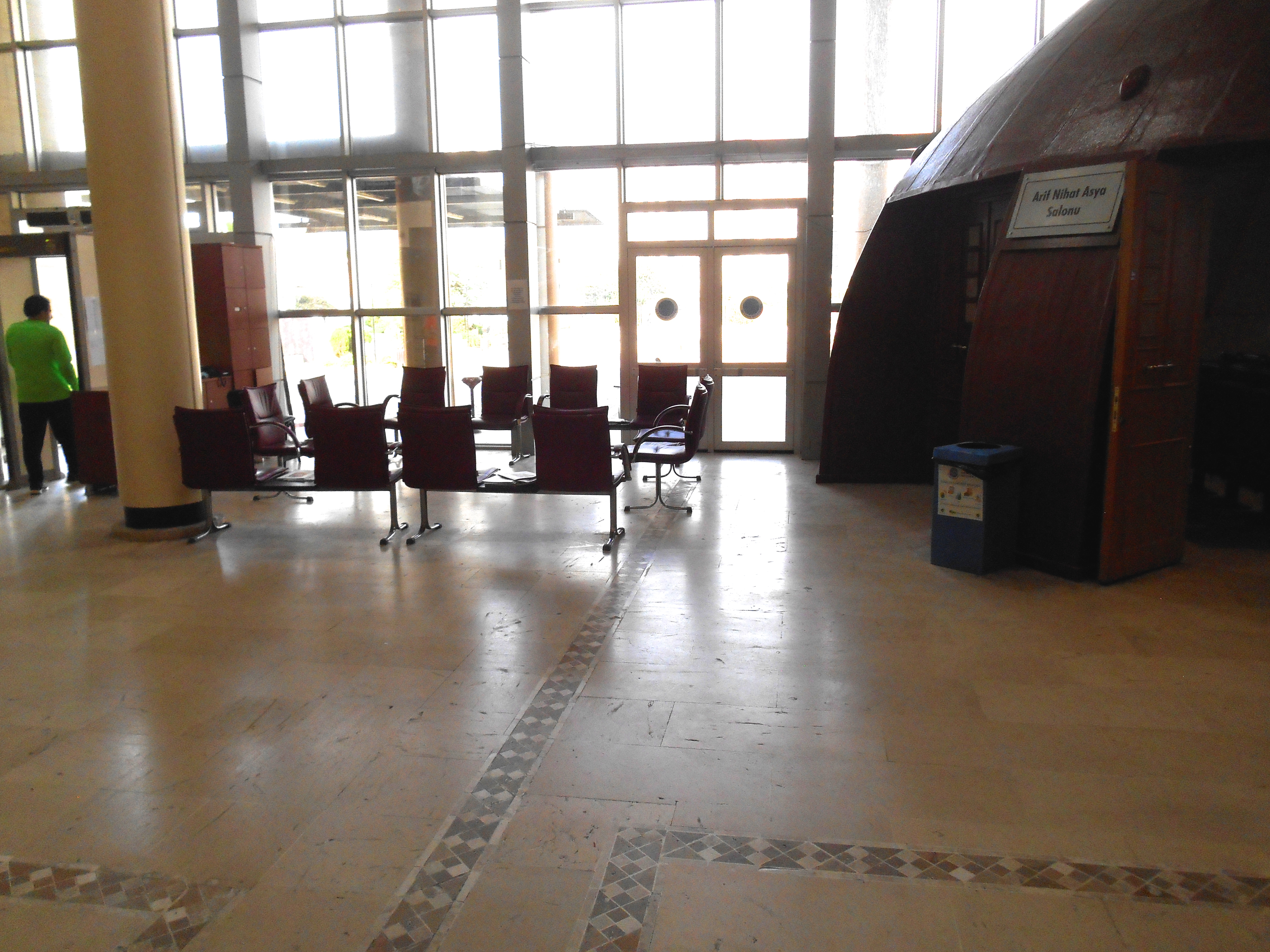

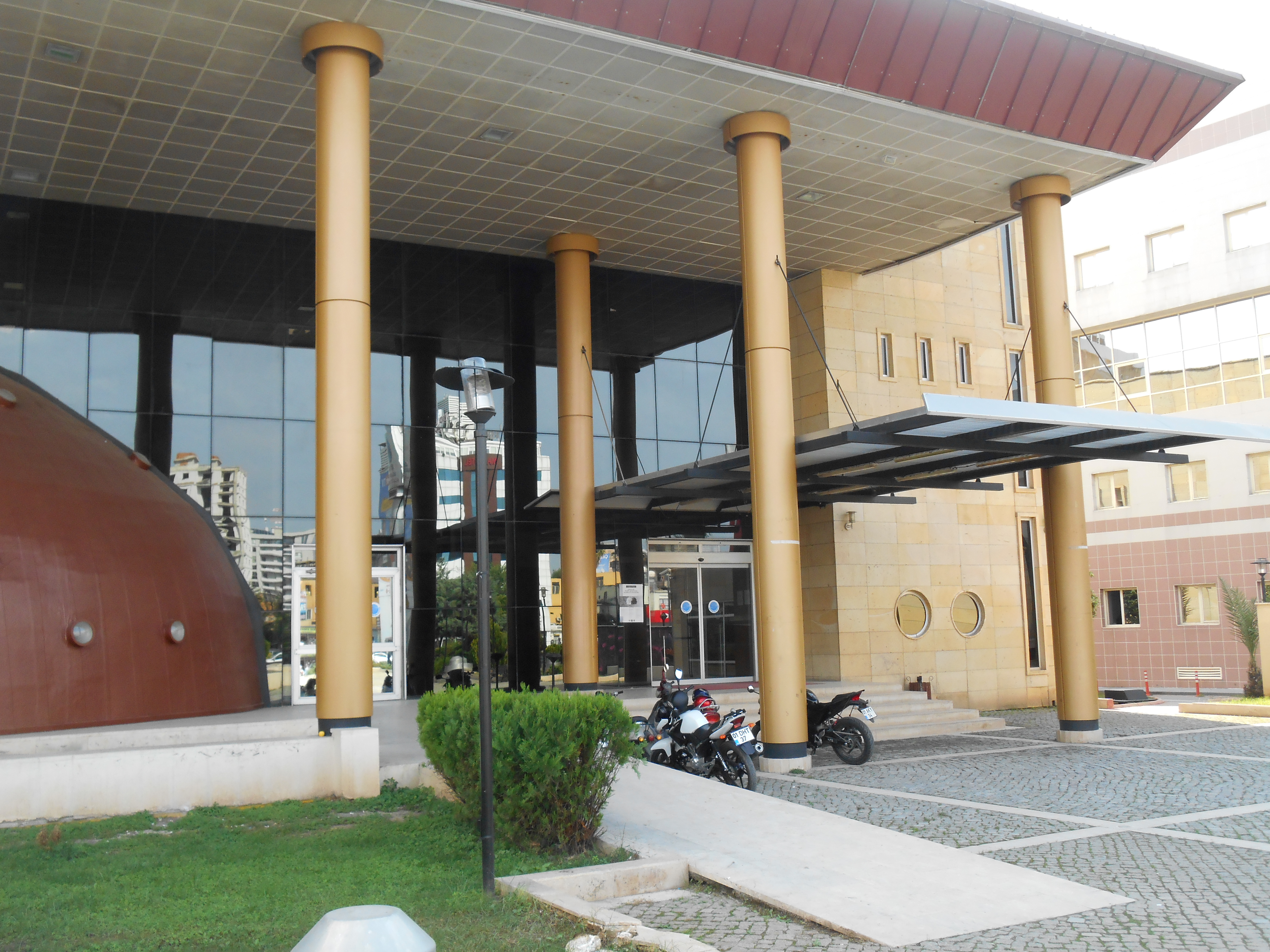

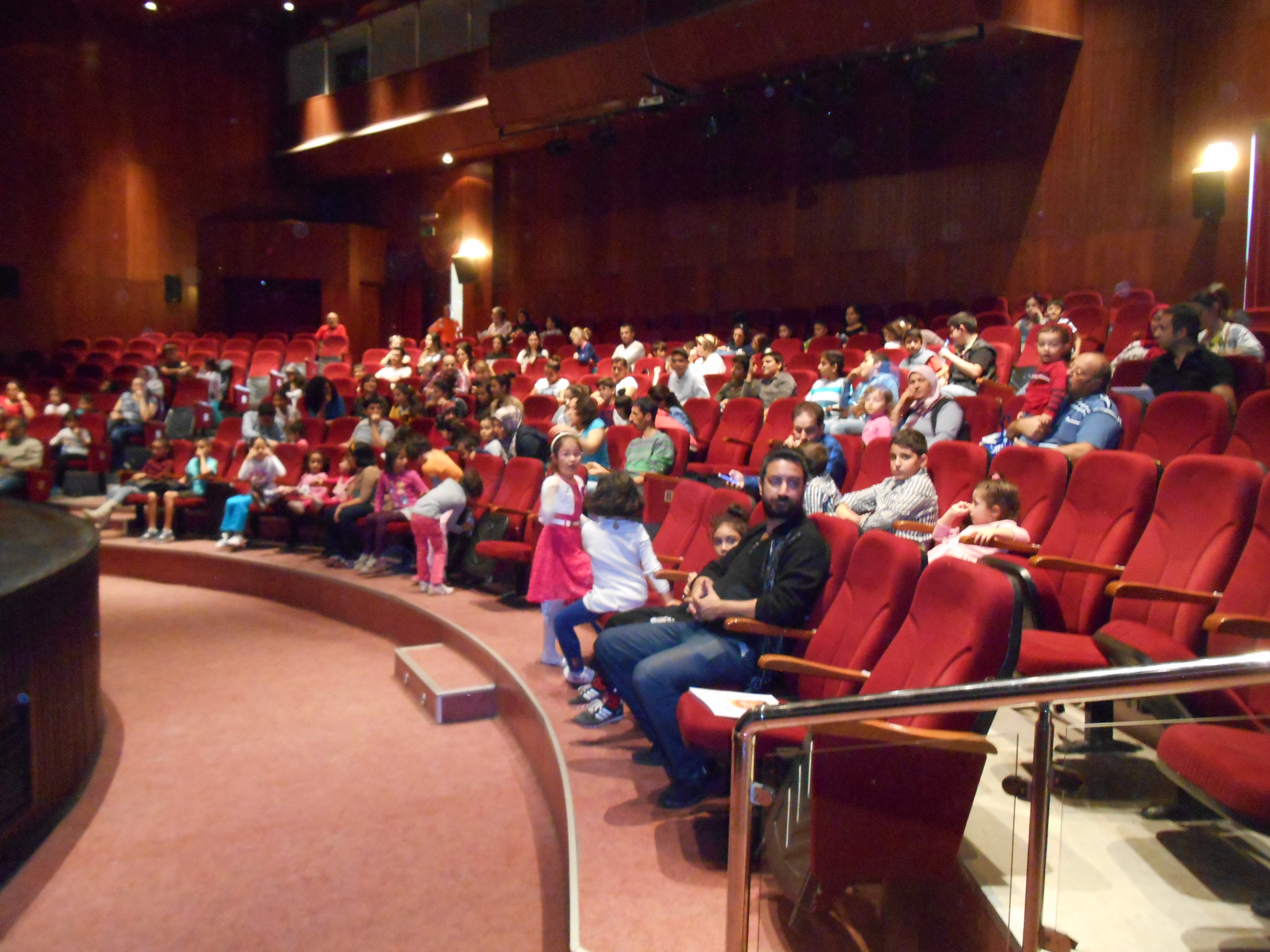
300-seater Necip Fazıl Kısakürek Hall

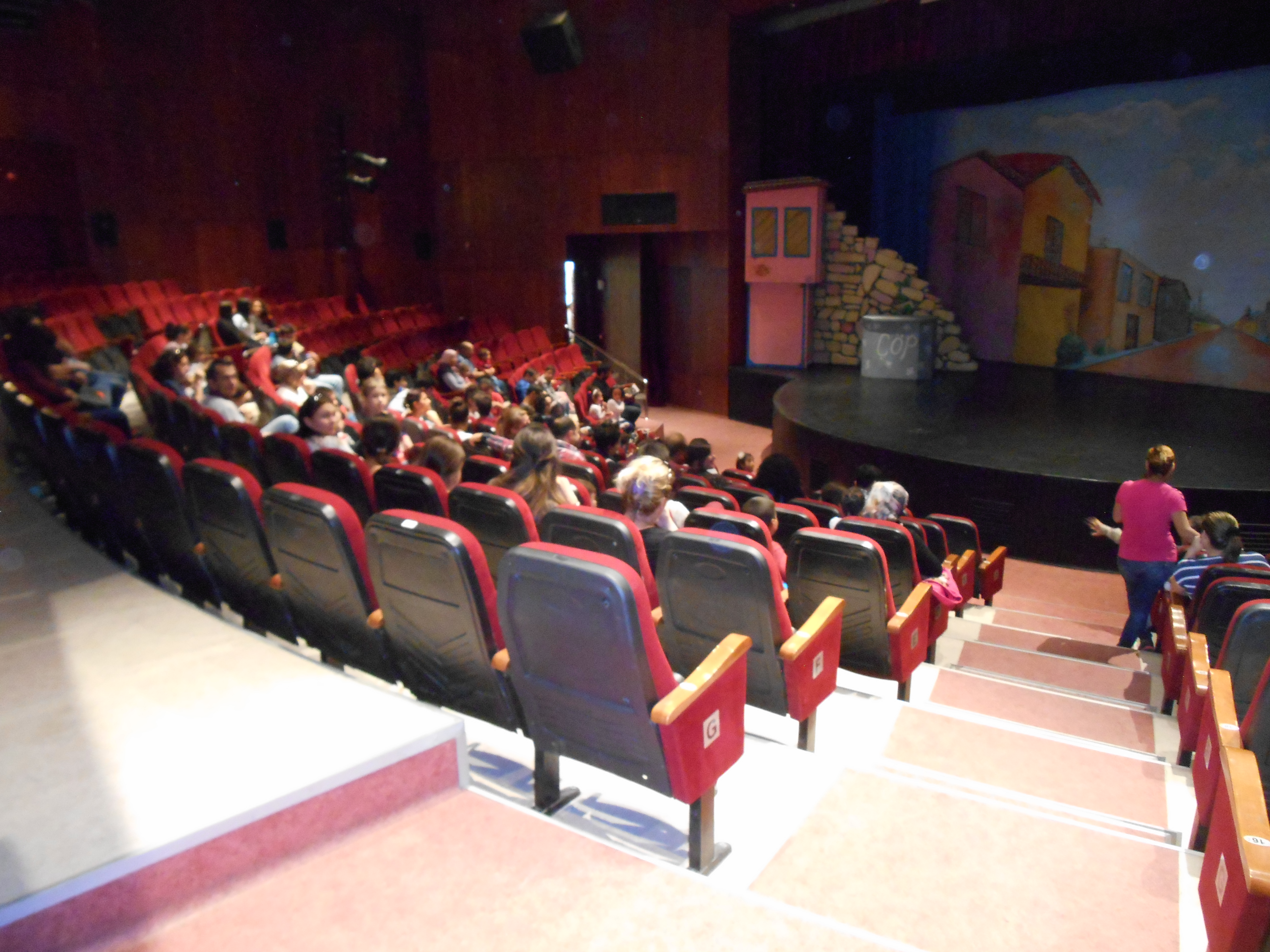
