= 5 January Fatih Terim Stadium =

Multi-purpose stadium in Adana, Turkey

Coordinates: 36°59′56″N 35°19′47″E

- 5 Ocak Fatih Terim Stadyumu
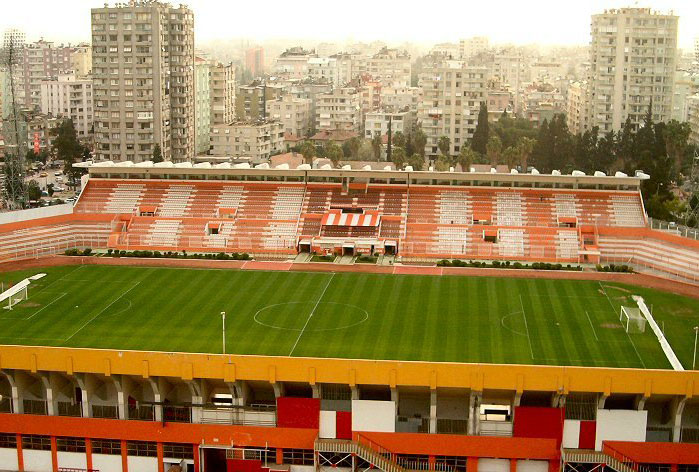
- Interactive map of 5 January Fatih Terim Stadium
- Former names: Adana Şehir Stadı
- Location: Reşatbey, Seyhan, Adana, Turkey
- Owner: Republic of Turkey
- Operator: Adana Youth and Sports Directorate
- Capacity: 16,095
- Surface: Grass

Construction
- Opened: 1938
- Closed: 2021
- Demolished: 2021

Tenants
- Adana Demirspor (1940–2021); Adanaspor (1954–2021)

The 5 January Fatih Terim Stadium (Turkish: 5 Ocak Fatih Terim Stadyumu) was a multi-purpose stadium in Adana, Turkey. It was opened in 1938, together with the Menderes Sports Hall and Gençlik Stadium as a sports complex, at the new neighborhood of Reşatbey. The stadium holds 16,095, with a large East and West stands and much smaller North and South stands. It abided UEFA standards for hosting Europa League games and TFF standards for hosting Super Lig games. The stadium was demolished in late 2021.

The stadium was used mostly for football matches, in which it used to be the home ground of Adana Demirspor and Adanaspor until the inauguration of New Adana Stadium in 2021. It hosted all the Adana derby games from 1956 to 2021. National football team of Turkey also played games at this stadium. It was also the venue for the celebrations of national days and public concerts.

== International events hosted ==
2015 UEFA Women's Under-17 Championship qualification

From April 11 to 16, three of the six 2015 UEFA Women's Under-17 Championship qualification - Elite round Group 1 games will be played in the stadium.

== Gallery ==
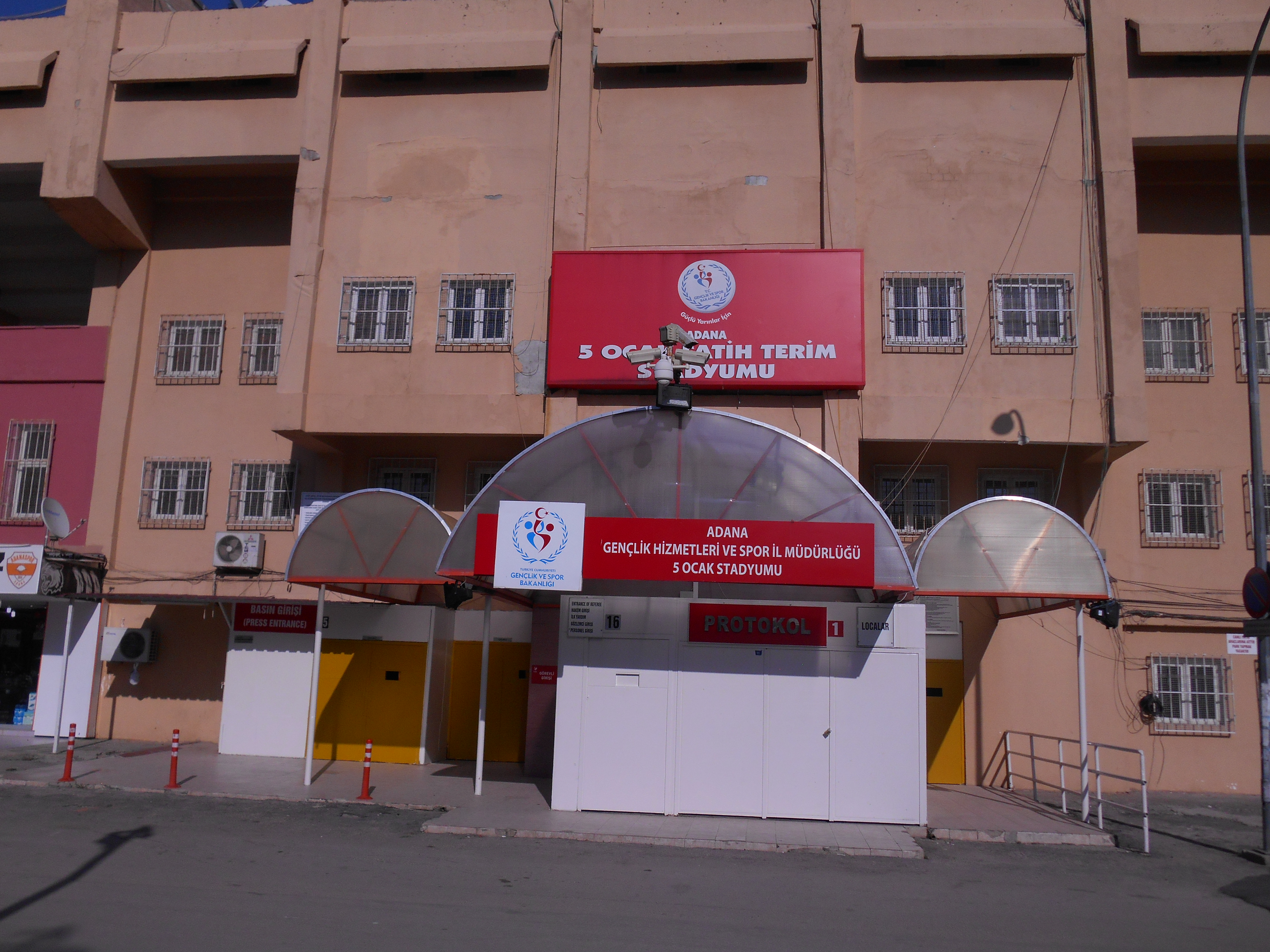
Main entrance

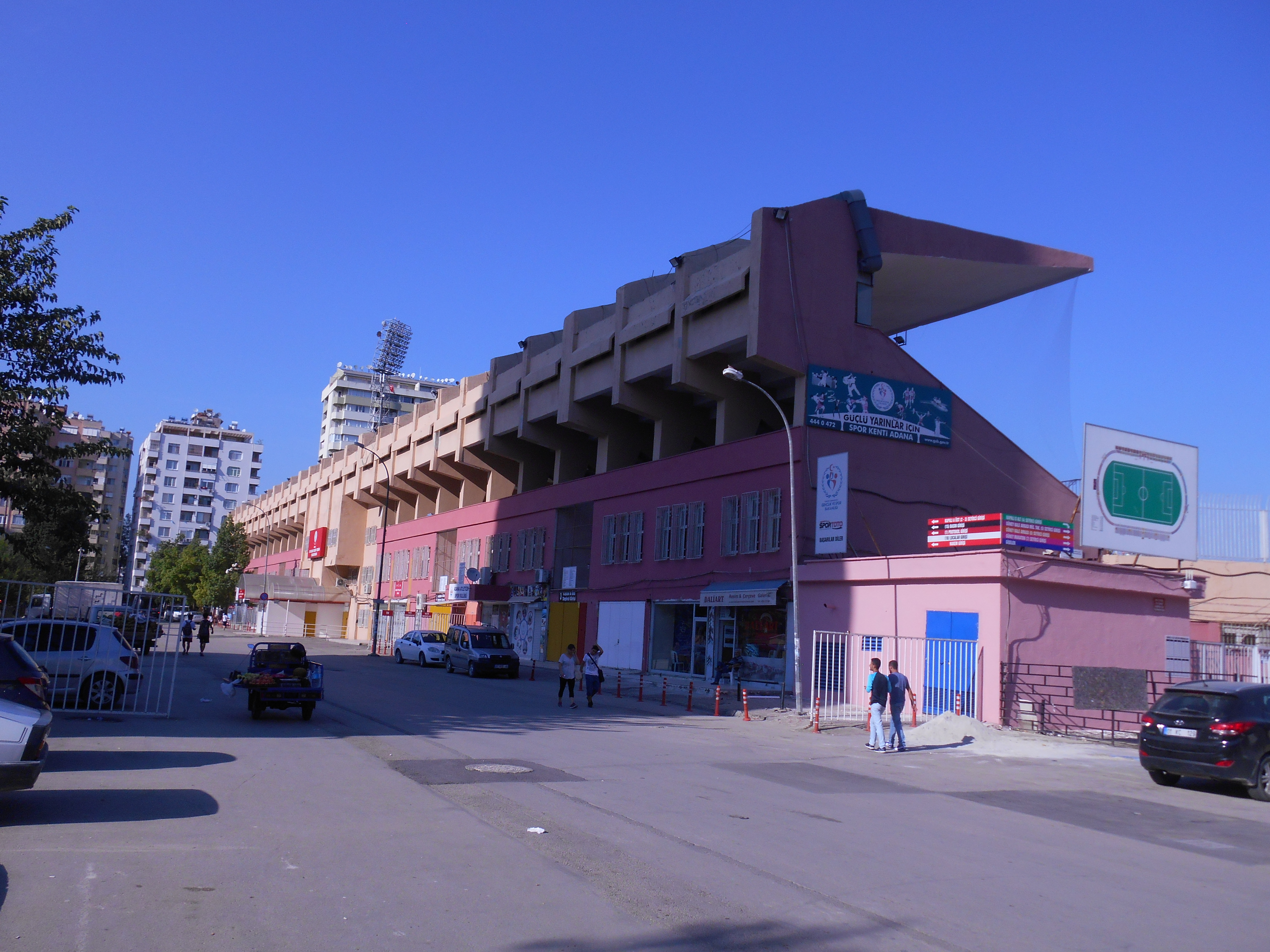
Sheltered West Stand

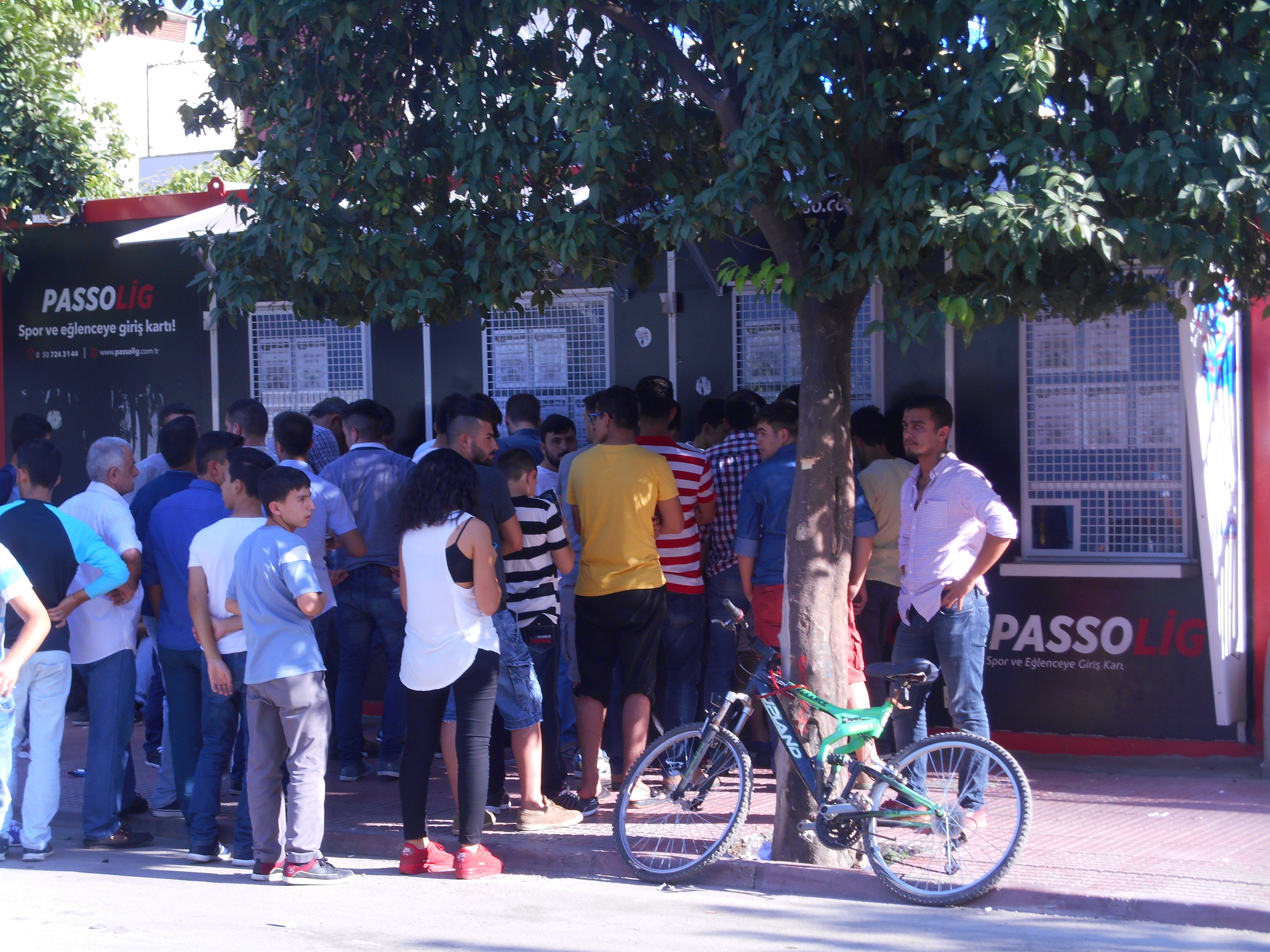
A ticket booth
