= Samican Keskin =

Turkish footballer

Personal information
- Full name: Mustafa Samican Keskin
- Date of birth: 14 August 1993 (age 33)
- Place of birth: Seyhan, Adana, Turkey
- Height: 1.72 m (5 ft 8 in)
- Positions: Midfielder; left back

Team information
- Current team: Orduspor 1967
- Number: 6

Youth career
- 2003–2006: Kuzey Adanaspor
- 2006–2011: Adanaspor

Senior career*
Years	Team	Apps	(Gls)
2011–2017	Adanaspor	119	(8)
2012–2013	→ Eyüpspor (loan)	12	(0)
2017–2019	Gazişehir Gaziantep	15	(1)
2019	→ Manisa BB (loan)	17	(2)
2019	Boluspor	10	(0)
2020	Adanaspor	11	(0)
2020–2021	Şanlıurfaspor	26	(1)
2021–2022	Karşıyaka	30	(6)
2022–	Orduspor 1967	4	(0)
- * Club domestic league appearances and goals as of 15 October 2022

Mustafa Samican Keskin (born 14 August 1993) is a Turkish footballer who plays for TFF Third League club Orduspor 1967.
