= Mürseloğlu, Seyhan =

Mürseloğlu
- Neighbourhood
- Location within Turkey
- Coordinates: 36°49′N 35°10′E
- Country: Turkey
- Province: Adana
- District: Seyhan
- Population (2022): 587
- Time zone: UTC+3 (TRT)

Mürseloğlu is a neighbourhood in the municipality and district of Seyhan, Adana Province, Turkey. Its population is 587 (2022).

The neighbourhood is populated by Alawites
