= Dörtağaç, Seyhan =

Dörtağaç
- Neighbourhood
- Location within Turkey
- Coordinates: 36.9003°N 35.1626°E
- Country: Turkey
- Province: Adana
- District: Seyhan
- Population (2022): 137
- Time zone: UTC+3 (TRT)

Dörtağaç is a neighbourhood in the municipality and district of Seyhan, Adana Province, Turkey. Its population is 137 (2022).
