= Büyükçıldırım, Seyhan =

Büyükçıldırım
- Neighbourhood
- Location in Turkey
- Coordinates: 36°55′40″N 35°08′55″E
- Country: Turkey
- Province: Adana
- District: Seyhan
- Population (2022): 109
- Time zone: UTC+3 (TRT)

Büyükçıldırım is a neighbourhood in the municipality and district of Seyhan, Adana Province, Turkey. Its population is 109 (2022).
