= Küçükdikili, Seyhan =

Küçükdikili
- Neighbourhood
- Location in Turkey
- Coordinates: 37°00′N 35°12′E
- Country: Turkey
- Province: Adana
- District: Seyhan
- Population (2022): 429
- Time zone: UTC+3 (TRT)

Küçükdikili is a neighbourhood in the municipality and district of Seyhan, Adana Province, Turkey. Its population is 429 (2022). It was an independent municipality until it was merged into the municipality of Seyhan in 2008.
