= Büyükdikili, Seyhan =

Büyükdikili
- Neighbourhood
- Location in Turkey
- Coordinates: 37°01′N 35°10′E
- Country: Turkey
- Province: Adana
- District: Seyhan
- Population (2022): 711
- Time zone: UTC+3 (TRT)

Büyükdikili is a neighbourhood in the municipality and district of Seyhan, Adana Province, Turkey. Its population is 711 (2022).
