= Çaputçu, Seyhan =

Çaputçu
- Neighbourhood
- Location in Turkey
- Coordinates: 36°51′N 35°11′E
- Country: Turkey
- Province: Adana
- District: Seyhan
- Population (2022): 260
- Time zone: UTC+3 (TRT)

Çaputçu is a neighbourhood in the municipality and district of Seyhan, Adana Province, Turkey. Its population is 260 (2022).
