= Karakuyu, Seyhan =

Karakuyu
- Neighbourhood
- Location in Turkey
- Coordinates: 37.0270°N 35.1445°E
- Country: Turkey
- Province: Adana
- District: Seyhan
- Population (2022): 630
- Time zone: UTC+3 (TRT)

Karakuyu is a neighbourhood in the municipality and district of Seyhan, Adana Province, Turkey. Its population is 630 (2022).
