= Ümit Can Batman =

Turkish footballer

Personal information
- Full name: Ümit Can Batman
- Date of birth: 26 June 1987 (age 39)
- Place of birth: Seyhan, Turkey
- Height: 1.86 m (6 ft 1 in)
- Position: Striker

Team information
- Current team: Kozan Belediyespor

Senior career*
Years	Team	Apps	(Gls)
2007–2010	Boluspor	6	(1)
2008	→ Darıca Gençlerbirliği (loan)	10	(4)
2008	→ Akçaabat Sebatspor (loan)	7	(0)
2009	→ Mardinspor (loan)	9	(3)
2010	→ İstanbulspor (loan)	8	(2)
2010–2011	Tokatspor	23	(8)
2011–2012	Gaziantep B.B.	10	(0)
2012–2013	Giresunspor	11	(1)
2013–2014	Tarsus Idman Yurdu	32	(10)
2014–2015	Tokatspor	16	(3)
2015	Fethiyespor	15	(2)
2015–2016	Tarsus Idman Yurdu	19	(2)
2016–	Kozan Belediyespor	0	(0)
- * Club domestic league appearances and goals as of 7 September 2015

Ümit Can Batman (born 26 June 1987 in Seyhan) is a Turkish professional footballer who plays for Kozan Belediyespor. He played previously for Boluspor.
