= Hadırlı, Seyhan =

Hadırlı
- Neighbourhood
- Location in Turkey
- Coordinates: 36°55′55″N 35°19′4″E
- Country: Turkey
- Province: Adana
- District: Seyhan
- Population (2022): 4,718
- Time zone: UTC+3 (TRT)

Hadırlı is a neighbourhood in the municipality and district of Seyhan, Adana Province, Turkey. Its population is 4,718 (2022).
