= Yalmanlı, Seyhan =

Yalmanlı
- Neighbourhood
- Location in Turkey
- Coordinates: 36°54′N 35°18′E
- Country: Turkey
- Province: Adana
- District: Seyhan
- Population (2022): 579
- Time zone: UTC+3 (TRT)

Yalmanlı is a neighbourhood in the municipality and district of Seyhan, Adana Province, Turkey. Its population is 579 (2022).
