= Zeytinli, Seyhan =

Zeytinli
- Neighbourhood
- Location in Turkey
- Coordinates: 36.9933°N 35.1340°E
- Country: Turkey
- Province: Adana
- District: Seyhan
- Population (2022): 1,336
- Time zone: UTC+3 (TRT)

Zeytinli is a neighbourhood in the municipality and district of Seyhan, Adana Province, Turkey. Its population is 1,336 (2022).
