= Meydan, Seyhan =

Meydan
- Neighbourhood
- Location in Turkey
- Coordinates: 36.9854°N 35.3059°E
- Country: Turkey
- Province: Adana
- District: Seyhan
- Population (2022): 7,844
- Time zone: UTC+3 (TRT)

Meydan is a neighbourhood in the municipality and district of Seyhan, Adana Province, Turkey. Its population is 7,844 (2022).
