= Gölbaşı, Seyhan =

Gölbaşı
- Neighbourhood
- Location in Turkey
- Coordinates: 36.9390°N 35.2214°E
- Country: Turkey
- Province: Adana
- District: Seyhan
- Population (2022): 772
- Time zone: UTC+3 (TRT)

Gölbaşı is a neighbourhood in the municipality and district of Seyhan, Adana Province, Turkey. Its population is 772 (2022).
