= Küçükçıldırım, Seyhan =

Küçükçıldırım
- Neighbourhood
- Location in Turkey
- Coordinates: 36°56′N 35°09′E
- Country: Turkey
- Province: Adana
- District: Seyhan
- Population (2022): 152
- Time zone: UTC+3 (TRT)

Küçükçıldırım is a neighbourhood in the municipality and district of Seyhan, Adana Province, Turkey. Its population is 152 (2022).
