= Köylüoğlu, Seyhan =

Köylüoğlu
- Neighbourhood
- Location in Turkey
- Coordinates: 36.8667°N 35.1833°E
- Country: Turkey
- Province: Adana
- District: Seyhan
- Population (2022): 232
- Time zone: UTC+3 (TRT)

Köylüoğlu is a neighbourhood in the municipality and district of Seyhan, Adana Province, Turkey. Its population is 232 (2022).
