= Kuyumcular, Seyhan =

Kuyumcular
- Neighbourhood
- Location in Turkey
- Coordinates: 37.0334°N 35.1535°E
- Country: Turkey
- Province: Adana
- District: Seyhan
- Population (2022): 626
- Time zone: UTC+3 (TRT)

Kuyumcular is a neighbourhood in the municipality and district of Seyhan, Adana Province, Turkey. Its population is 626 (2022).
