= Sarıhamzalı, Seyhan =

Sarıhamzalı
- Neighbourhood
- Location in Turkey
- Coordinates: 36.9775°N 35.2253°E
- Country: Turkey
- Province: Adana
- District: Seyhan
- Population (2022): 11,977
- Time zone: UTC+3 (TRT)

Sarıhamzalı is a neighbourhood in the municipality and district of Seyhan, Adana Province, Turkey. Its population is 11,977 (2022).
