= Seyhan =

- District and municipality
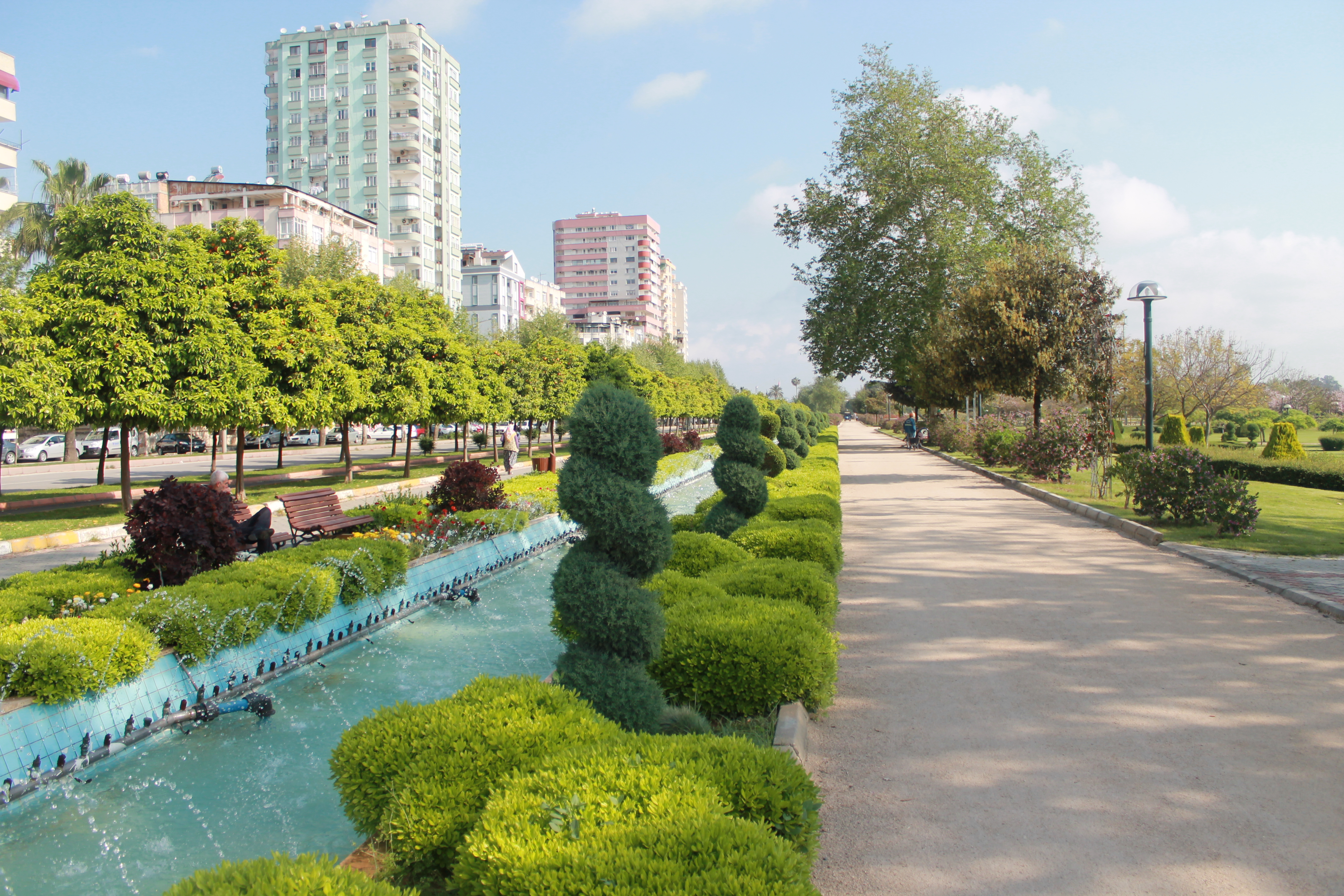

- Map showing Seyhan District in Adana Province

- Location within Turkey
- Coordinates: 36°58′59″N 35°19′58″E
- Country: Turkey
- Province: Adana

Government
  - Mayor: Oya Tekin (CHP)
  - Kaymakam: Ekrem İnci
- Area: 444 km^{2} (171 sq mi)
- Elevation: 23 m (75 ft)
- Population (2022): 795,012
  - Density: 1,790/km^{2} (4,640/sq mi)
- Time zone: UTC+3 (TRT)
- Postal code: 01010
- Area code: 0322
- Website: www.seyhan.bel.tr www.seyhan.gov.tr

Seyhan is a district-municipality in the Adana Province of Turkey. Its area is 444 km^{2}, and its population is 795,012 (2022). It forms the core of the Adana urban area. Seyhan is home to 35 percent of the residents of Adana Province and almost half of the residents of the city of Adana. It is the fifth most populous metropolitan district in Turkey.

Seyhan is the first settlement area of Adana and currently the administrative, business and cultural center of the city. It includes the historical neighbourhood of Tepebağ, and the landmarks such as Büyüksaat, Ulu Camii, Ramazanoğlu Hall and Sabancı Merkez Camii. Adana Center for Arts and Culture, Sabancı Cultural Center, Seyhan Cultural Center and Metropolitan Theatre are also located in the district. The district gets its name from the river that forms the east border.

== Governance ==
Seyhan district is administered by three levels of government; central government, provincial administration and the municipality.

Seyhan Governorship is the district branch of the central government operating under the Adana Governorship. The chief executive of the Seyhan district is the District Governor who is appointed by the Ministry of Internal Affairs. Seyhan Governorship overseas the functioning of the district directorates of the ministries.

Seyhan directorate of the Adana Province Special Administration is the district branch of the provincial administration. Seyhan district is represented with 11 members at the 61-member Adana Provincial Parliament.

Seyhan Municipality serves the entire Seyhan district and it is further divided into neighbourhoods, the smallest administrative units of the province.

=== Seyhan Municipality ===
Seyhan Municipality was incorporated in 1986 as a lower-tier municipality as Adana Municipality is upgraded to a metropolitan status. The organs of the Seyhan Municipality are the mayor, encümen (the executive committee) and the municipal council.

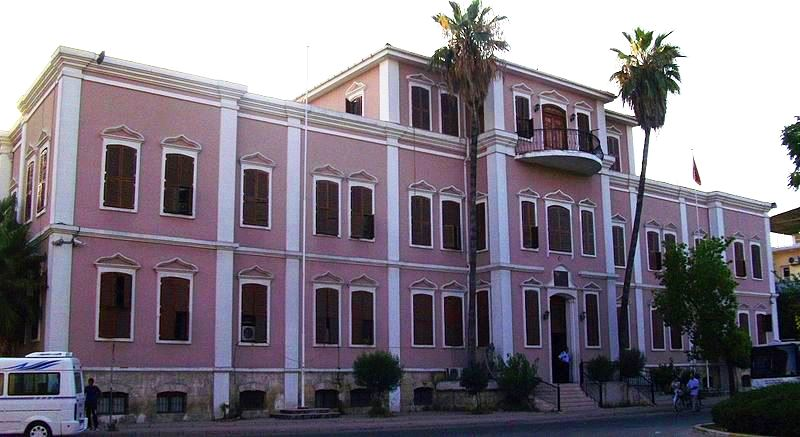
District Hall

==== Mayor ====
Mayor is the chief executive of the municipality, presides municipal departments and chairs the municipal council. Mayoral candidates are either nominated by National Parties or run independently. The mayor is elected by first past the post voting for a 5-year term.

Oya Tekin is the mayor of Seyhan since April 2024. Tekin is currently serving his first term, and she is the first woman mayor of Seyhan and the first elected woman mayor in the Adana Province.

Seyhan Mayor Election, 2024
Party		Candidate	Votes	%	±%
1	CHP	Oya Tekin	158,116	41.51	-16.33
2	AKP	Erdal Hatipoğlu	121,782	31.97	-6.36
3	DEM Party	Mehmet Karakış	48,091	12.63	
4	İYİ	Akif Kemal Akay	25,434	6.68	

==== Municipal Council ====
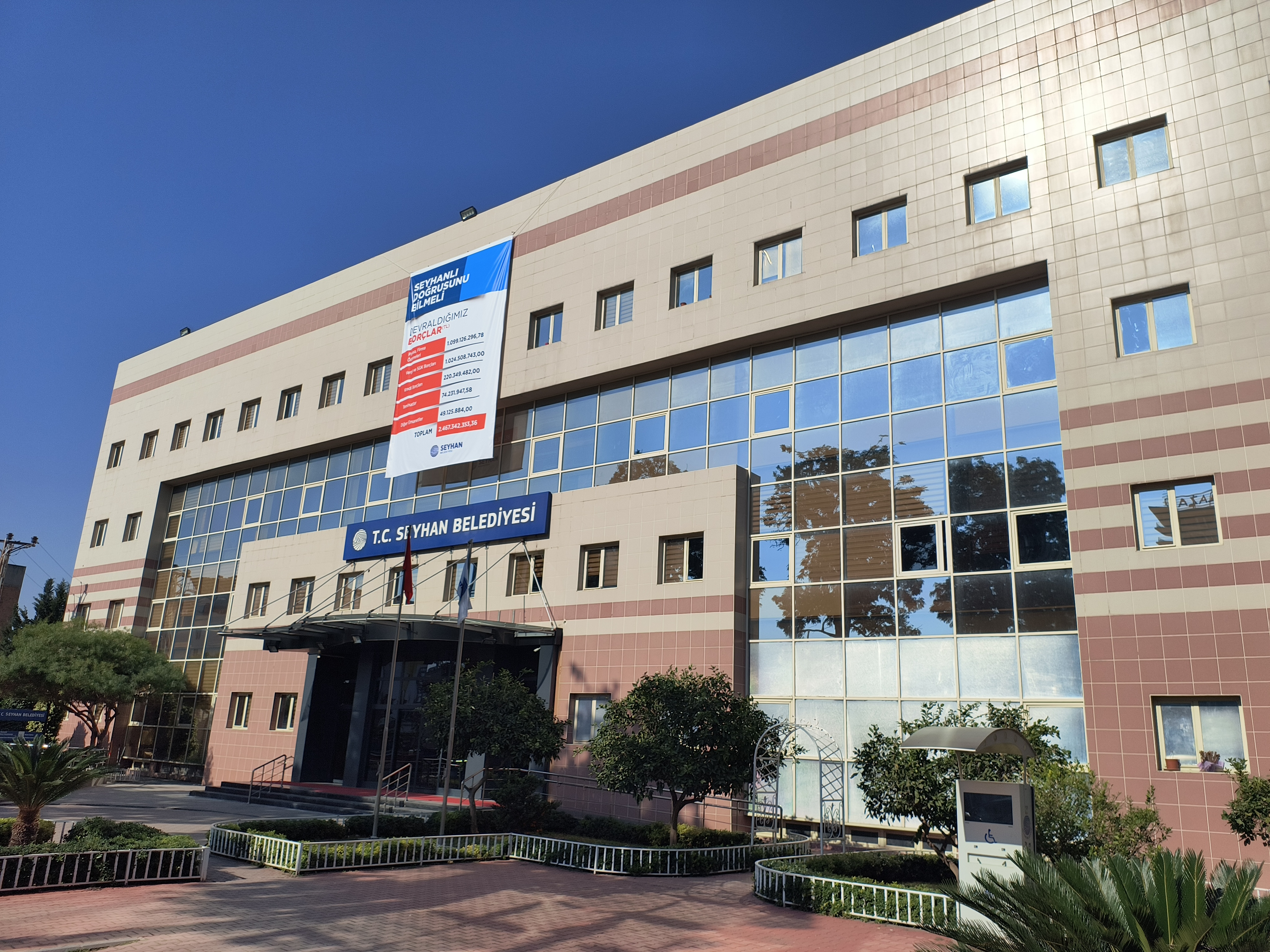
Municipality Hall

Municipal Council is the decision making organ of the Seyhan Municipality. It is responsible for approving by-laws, founding, splitting or amalgamating neighbourhoods, strategic planning, urban development planning and zoning, making investments, budgeting, loaning and controlling the mayor's activities. The chair of the council is the mayor. Mayor is assisted by two vice-chairs and two council secretaries who are elected by the council.

The 21 commissions of the council are; environment, legal, urban development, budget planning, education, culture, transportation, tariffs, health care, public relations, youth and sports, consumer protection, auditing, human rights, real estate, social services, EU and foreign affairs, tourism, disabled rights, earthquake and disasters and urban transformation. Each commission has 5 councilor members elected by the council.

Municipal Council consists of 45 members. The candidates for the councilor positions are either nominated by National Parties or run independently. The councilors are elected by the d'Hondt method, where the whole municipality is one electoral district and there is 10% threshold for a party to gain seat at the council. As with mayor, councilors are elected for a 5-year term. Left-wing and right-wing parties have a slight balance at the council. Left leaning CHP leads the council with 18 members, conservative AKP and far-right Turkish nationalist MHP have 12 members and left-wing pro-Kurdish BDP has 3 members at the council.

== Neighbourhoods ==
Neighbourhoods (Mahalle) are administered by the muhtar and the Neighbourhood Seniors Council consisting of 4 members. Muhtar and the Senior Council are elected for 5 years at the local elections and are not affiliated with political parties. Neighbourhoods are not an incorporation therefore do not hold government status. Muhtar, although being elected by the residents, acts merely as an administrator of the district governor. Muhtar can voice neighbourhood issues to the municipal hall together with the Seniors Council.

The 96 neighbourhoods of Seyhan District are:

- Ahmet Remzi Yüreğir
- Akkapı
- Alidede
- Aydınlar
- Bahçelievler
- Bahçeşehir
- Barbaros
- Barış
- Beşocak
- Bey
- Büyükçıldırım
- Büyükdikili
- Camuzcu
- Çaputçu
- Cemalpaşa
- Çınarlı
- Dağlıoğlu
- Demetevler
- Denizli
- Dervişler
- Dörtağaç
- Döşeme
- Dumlupınar
- Emek
- Fatih
- Fevzipaşa
- Gazipaşa
- Gökçeler
- Gölbaşı
- Gülbahçesi
- Gülpınar
- Gürselpaşa
- Hadırlı
- Hanedan
- Havuzlubahçe
- Hurmalı
- Hürriyet
- İkibinevler
- İsmetpaşa
- İstiklal
- Karakuyu
- Karasoku
- Karayusuflu
- Kavaklı
- Kayalıbağ
- Kayışlı
- Kocavezir
- Köylüoğlu
- Koyuncu
- Koza
- Küçükçıldırım
- Küçükdikili
- Kurtuluş
- Kuruköprü
- Kuyumcular
- Mekan
- Mestanzade
- Meydan
- Mıdık
- Mirzaçelebi
- Mithatpaşa
- Mürseloğlu
- Namıkkemal
- Narlıca
- Onur
- Ova
- Pınar
- Reşatbey
- Sakarya
- Şakirpaşa
- Salmanbeyli
- Sarıhamzalı
- Sarıhuğlar
- Sarıyakup
- Şehitduran
- Serinevler
- Söğütlü
- Sucuzade
- Sümer
- Tellidere
- Tepebağ
- Türkocağı
- Uçak
- Ulucami
- Yalmanlı
- Yenibaraj
- Yenibey
- Yenidam
- Yenimahalle
- Yeşilevler
- Yeşiloba
- Yeşilyurt
- Yeşilyuva
- Yolgeçen
- Zeytinli
- Ziyapaşa

=== Neighbourhoods in the urban area ===
The urban neighbourhoods of Seyhan are spread into 7 distinctive zones. The major separators of these zones are the D400 state road, railway line, Adana Metro, Şakirpaşa Airport and the little canal.

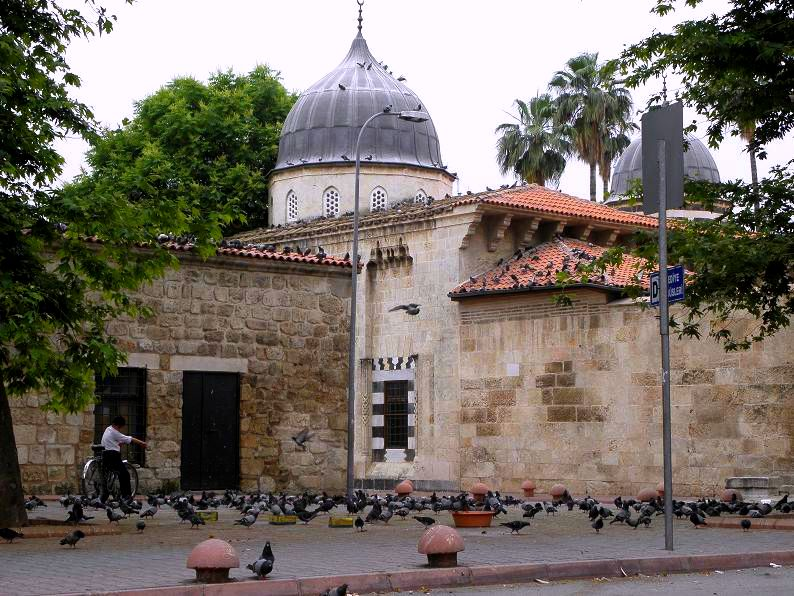
Ulu Camii

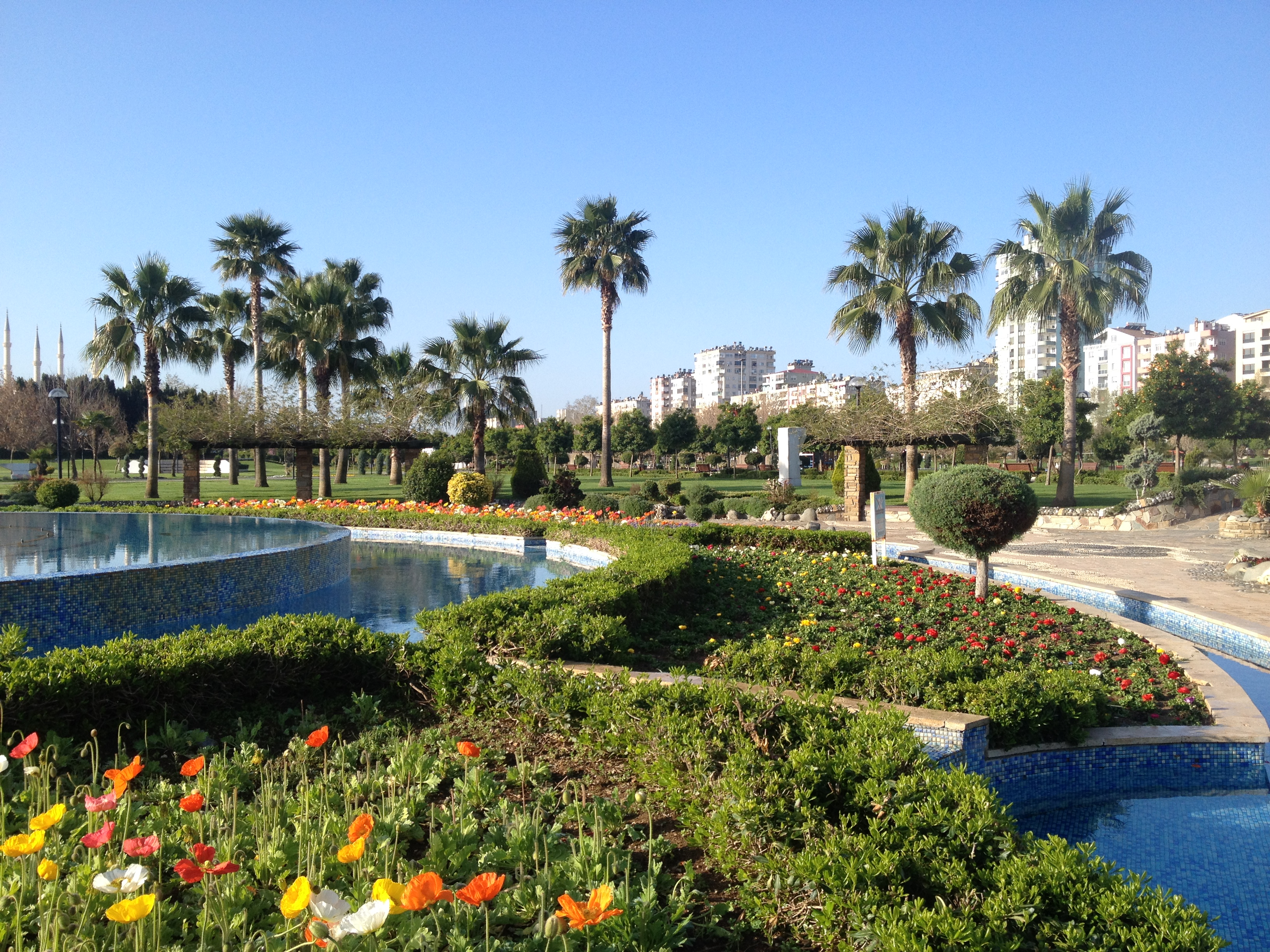
Seyhan general view

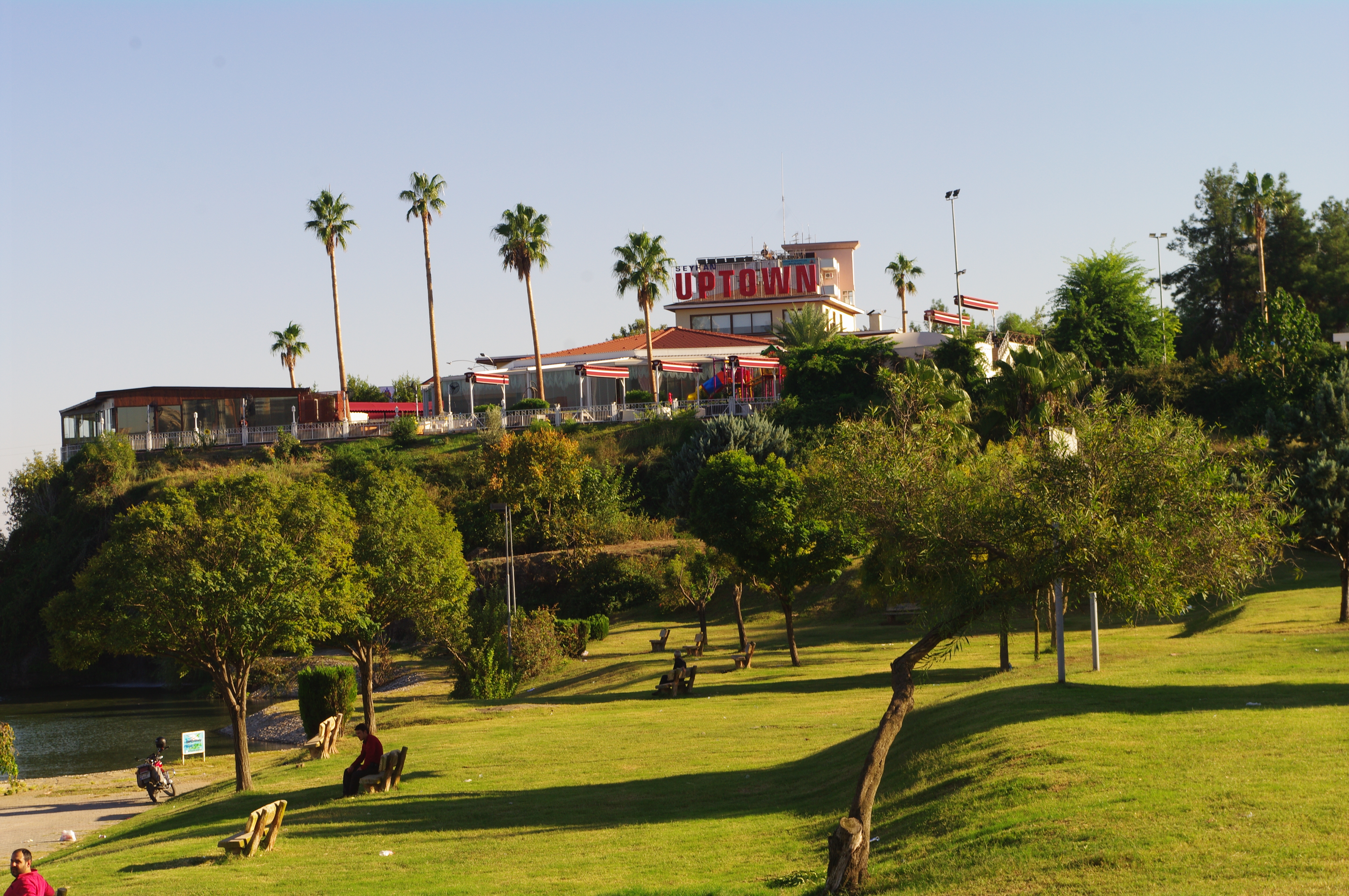
Dilberler Sekisi Park

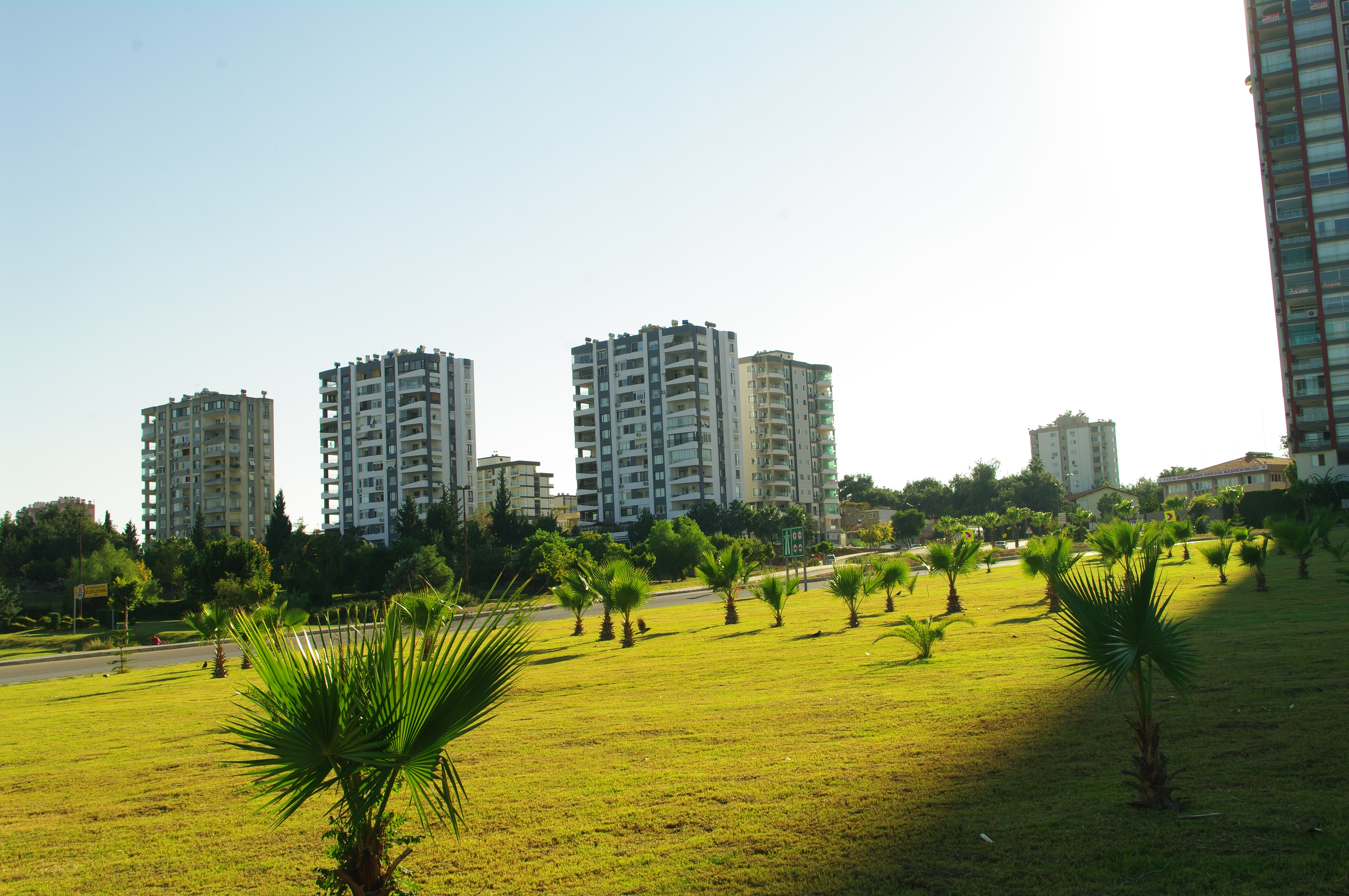
Dilberler Sekisi

Old Town: Referring to the city of Adana before the foundation of the Republic, this zone is bordered by D400 state road on the road, Seyhan river on the west, roughly Debboy and Obalar street at the south and the Adana Şakirpaşa Airport on the west. The city was first founded in Tepebağ and then spread in three directions, thus this zone holds almost all the history of Adana. The 20 neighbourhoods of this zone are; Kayalıbağ, Tepebağ, Karasoku, Ulucamii, Türkocağı, Sarıyakup, Alidede, Beşocak, Hurmalı, Kuruköprü, Hanedan, Kocavezir, Sucuzade, Mirzaçelebi, İstiklal, Yeşilyuva, Emek, Meydan, Gülpınar and Dumlupınar.

Three boulevards: This zone is one of the fine samples of planned neighbourhoods of the Republic Era. It is locally named with the three major boulevards passing within the zone, Ziyapaşa, Atatürk and Gazipaşa. Founded north of the city, it is currently bordered by D-400 state road on the south, Seyhan river on the west, railway line on the north and metro line on the west. The metropolitan hall is located in this zone close to the intersection of Atatürk boulevard and D400 state road. It hosts the major sports venues of Adana: 5 Ocak Stadium, Atatürk Swimming Complex and Menderes Sports Hall. The most popular parks of the city, Merkez Park and the Atatürk Park, are also located here. The four neighbourhoods of this zone are; Reşatbey, Çınarlı, Cemalpaşa and Kurtuluş. The population of this zone is 39,037.

North of the railway line: Covering the area north of the railway line, west of the Seyhan river, east of the metro line and south of the Çukurova district, this zone has seen rapid growth since the 1960s and has planned and unplanned sections. North-west part of this zone is known as the Hospitals area, home to Numune, Chest Diseases and the Military hospitals. The 6 neighbourhoods of this zone are Ziyapaşa, Sümer, Gazipaşa, Namık Kemal, Yenibaraj and Yeşilyurt.

North of the little canal: Mostly an unplanned residential zone, it is bordered by the little irrigation canal on the south, metro line on the east, Çukurova district on the north and roughly Öğretmenler Boulevard on the west. The 10 neighbourhoods of this zone are; Tellidere, Fatih, Pınar, 2000 Evler, Gürselpaşa, Güzelyurt, Kıyıboyu, Mavibulvar, Bahçeşehir and Yeni Mahalle

South of the little canal: This zone covers the area, little canal on the north, the metro line on the east, D400 state road on the south and Öğretmenler Boulevard on the west. It is a residential and an industrial zone and home to Adana City Hall, Adana Province Special Administration headquarters and the Adana Police headquarters (under construction). 12 neighbourhoods of the zone are; Mithatpaşa, Döşeme, Denizli, Narlıca, Ahmet Remzi Yüreğir, Sakarya, İsmetpaşa, Yeşilevler, Demetevler, Barış, Fevzipaşa and Aydınlar.

East of the Airport: Covering the area west and north of the Şakirpaşa Airport, south of the D400 and west of the Adana Hippodrome, it has unplanned residential areas as well as small-scale industrial sites. 5 neighbourhoods of this zone are; Şakirpaşa, Uçak, Onur, Ova and Yeşiloba,

South of the Old Town: This zone covers the area south of the old town and Şakirpaşa Airport and west of the Seyhan river. It is largely a low-income residential area of unplanned neighbourhoods filled with shanty homes. It was started being populated during the city's explosive growth in the 1950s and seen further growth during the mass migration of Kurds from Southeastern Anatolia Region in the 1990s during the peak of the Kurdish–Turkish conflict. The unemployment rates are very high in this zone. The 12 neighbourhoods of this zone are; Mestanzade, Hürriyet, Havuzlubahçe, Bahçelievler, Dağlıoğlu, Gülbahçesi, Şehit Duran, Yenibey, Barbaros, Bey, Akkapı, Mıdık.

=== Neighbourhoods outside the urban area ===
As the city borders are expanded, the municipalities and the villages in the new limits of the city are annexed to the city. Neighbourhoods of the former municipalities and former villages then became part of the Seyhan district as neighbourhoods. There are total of 30 non-urban neighbourhoods which are located on the west and south end of Seyhan.

Karayusuflu: 9 neighbourhoods of this former municipality are; Bahçelievler, Serinevler, Kayışlı, Salmanbeyli, Dervişler, Çaputçu, Köylüoğlu, Dörtağaç, Mürseloğlu

Küçükdikili: 5 neighbourhoods of this former municipality are; Çınarlı, Dikili, Kavaklı, Mekan, Söğütlü,

Former Villages: 16 neighbourhoods that were formerly villages are; Büyük Çıldırım, Büyük Dikili, Camuzcu, Gökçeler, Gölbaşı, Karakuyu, Koyuncu, Kuyumcular, Küçük Çıldırım, Sarıhamzalı, Sarıhuğlar, Yalmanlı, Yenidam, Yolgeçen, Zeytinli, Hadırlı,

== Notable people ==
- Ümit Can Batman (born 1987), professional footballer
