= Camuzcu, Seyhan =

Camuzcu
- Neighbourhood
- Location in Turkey
- Coordinates: 36°55′N 35°16′E
- Country: Turkey
- Province: Adana
- District: Seyhan
- Population (2022): 484
- Time zone: UTC+3 (TRT)

Camuzcu is a neighbourhood in the municipality and district of Seyhan, Adana Province, Turkey. Its population is 484 (2022).
