= Yenidam, Seyhan =

Yenidam
- Neighbourhood
- Location in Turkey
- Coordinates: 36.9556°N 35.2466°E
- Country: Turkey
- Province: Adana
- District: Seyhan
- Population (2022): 392
- Time zone: UTC+3 (TRT)

Yenidam is a neighbourhood in the municipality and district of Seyhan, Adana Province, Turkey. Its population is 392 (2022).
