= Yolgeçen, Seyhan =

Yolgeçen
- Neighbourhood
- Location in Turkey
- Coordinates: 36.9673°N 35.1918°E
- Country: Turkey
- Province: Adana
- District: Seyhan
- Population (2022): 257
- Time zone: UTC+3 (TRT)

Yolgeçen is a neighbourhood in the municipality and district of Seyhan, Adana Province, Turkey. Its population is 257 (2022).
