= Karayusuflu, Seyhan =

Karayusuflu
- Neighbourhood
- Location within Turkey
- Coordinates: 36.8702°N 35.2448°E
- Country: Turkey
- Province: Adana
- District: Seyhan
- Population (2022): 661
- Time zone: UTC+3 (TRT)

Karayusuflu is a neighbourhood in the municipality and district of Seyhan, Adana Province, Turkey. Its population is 661 (2022). It was an independent municipality until it was merged into the municipality of Seyhan in 2008.

The neighbourhood is populated by Alawites
