= Kayışlı, Seyhan =

Kayışlı
- Neighbourhood
- Location in Turkey
- Coordinates: 36.8901°N 35.2376°E
- Country: Turkey
- Province: Adana
- District: Seyhan
- Population (2022): 612
- Time zone: UTC+3 (TRT)

Kayışlı is a neighbourhood in the municipality and district of Seyhan, Adana Province, Turkey. Its population is 612 (2022).
