= Koyuncu, Seyhan =

Koyuncu
- Neighbourhood
- Location in Turkey
- Coordinates: 36.8937°N 35.2779°E
- Country: Turkey
- Province: Adana
- District: Seyhan
- Population (2022): 289
- Time zone: UTC+3 (TRT)

Koyuncu is a neighbourhood in the municipality and district of Seyhan, Adana Province, Turkey. Its population is 289 (2022).
