= İstiklal, Seyhan =

İstiklal
- Neighbourhood
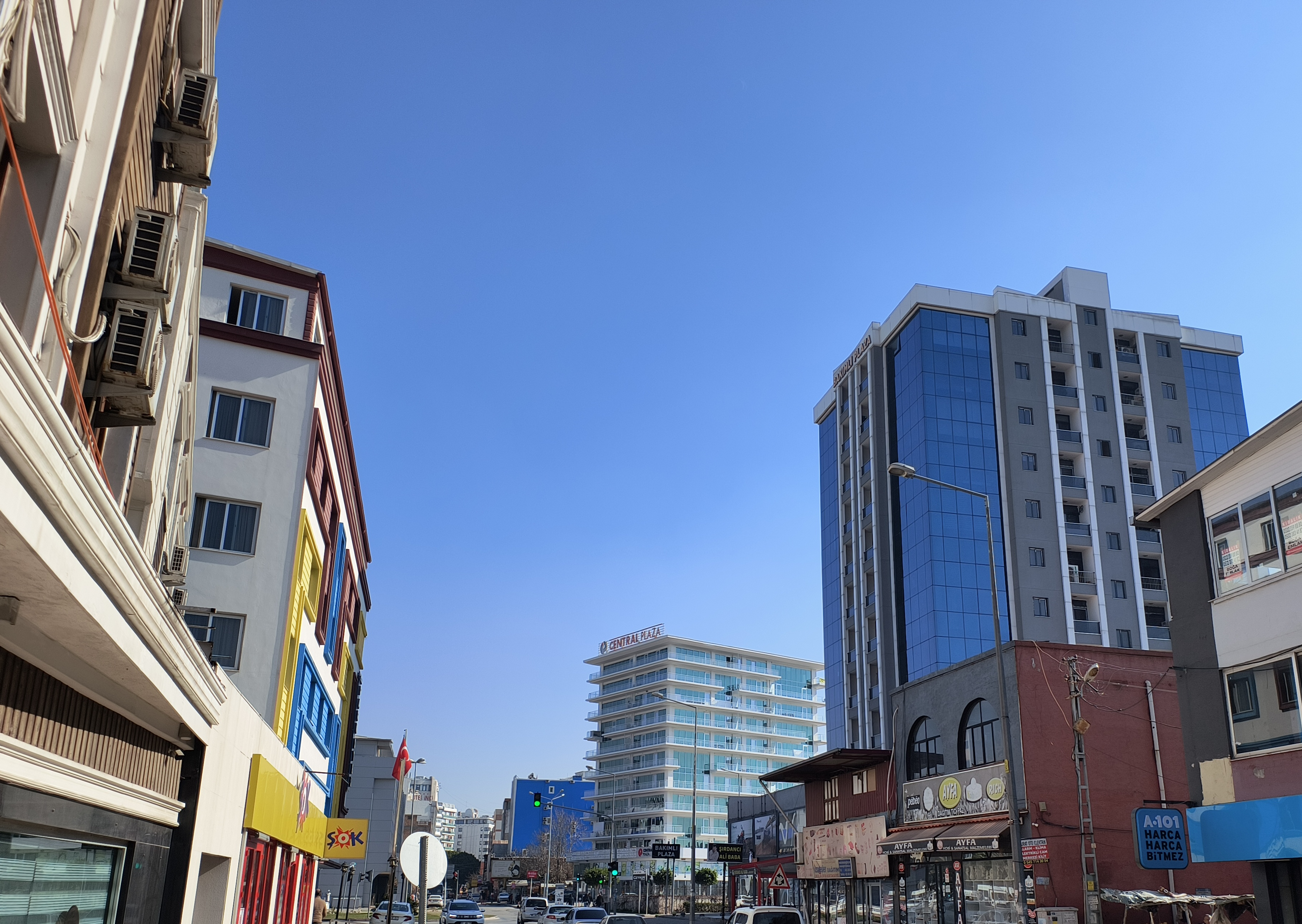
- Kurtuluş street

- Location within Turkey
- Coordinates: 36°59′25″N 35°18′38″E
- Country: Turkey
- Province: Adana
- District: Seyhan
- Elevation: 20 m (66 ft)
- Population (2022): 6,137
- Time zone: UTC+3 (TRT)
- Area code: 322

İstiklal is a historical neighbourhood (mahalle) in the Seyhan district of Adana Province, and has a of population is 6,137 (2022). The neighbourhood is at the west end of the old town of Adana, situated south of the D400 state road and east of the Adana Metro line.

İstiklal is the former Greek neighborhood of Adana, that developed around the first railway station that had opened in 1886 and led to the expansion of the city to the west. Textile businessmen, mostly of Greek ethnicity, moved to the city, opened textile factories and built houses in the neighborhood. Manufacturing plants of Istiklal were the first large production facilities of Cilicia.

== Governance ==
İstiklal is a mahalle and it is administered by the Muhtar and the Seniors Council.

== Demographics ==
The neighborhood is mostly made up of Turkish residents.

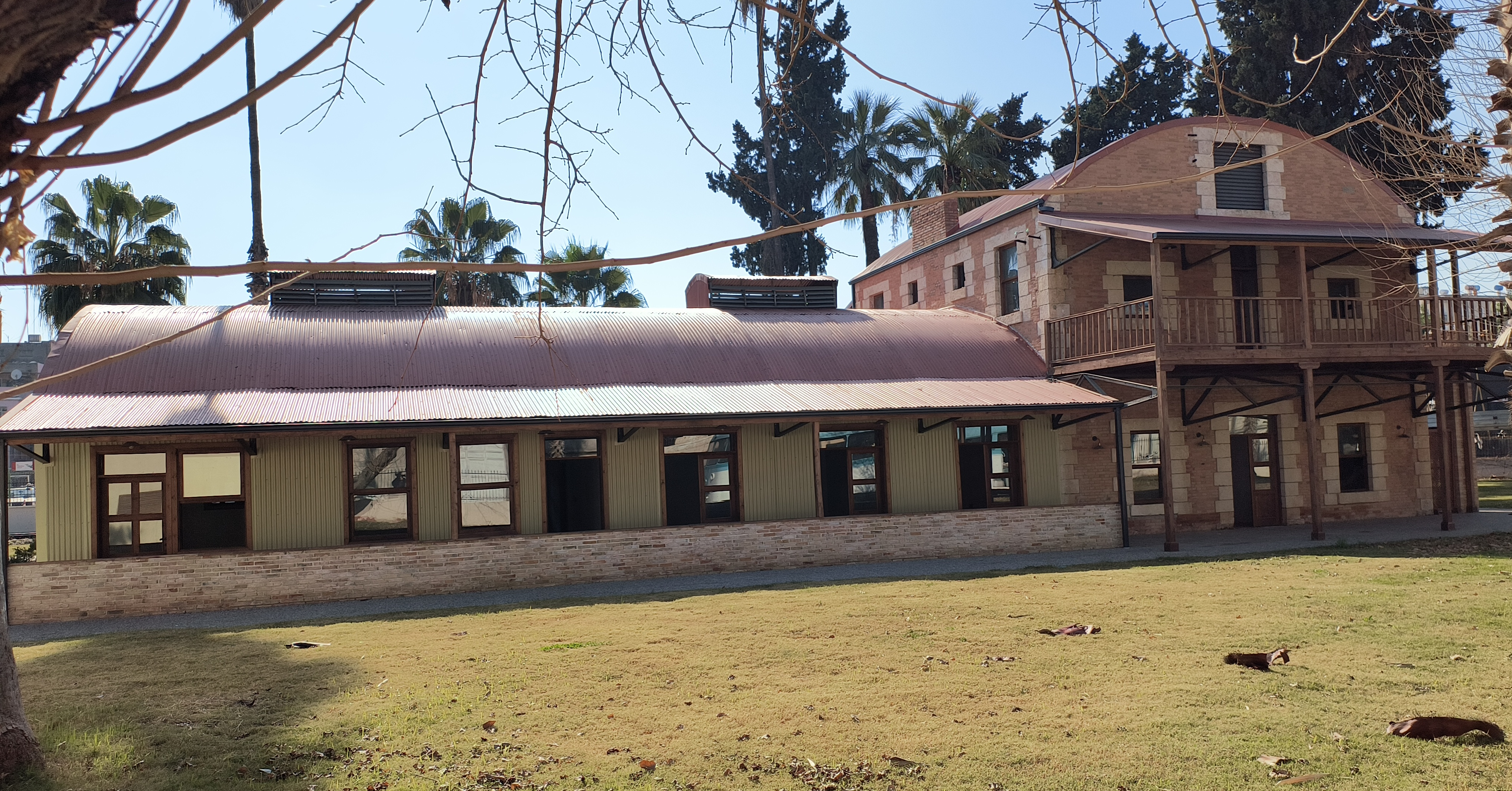
City's first railway station

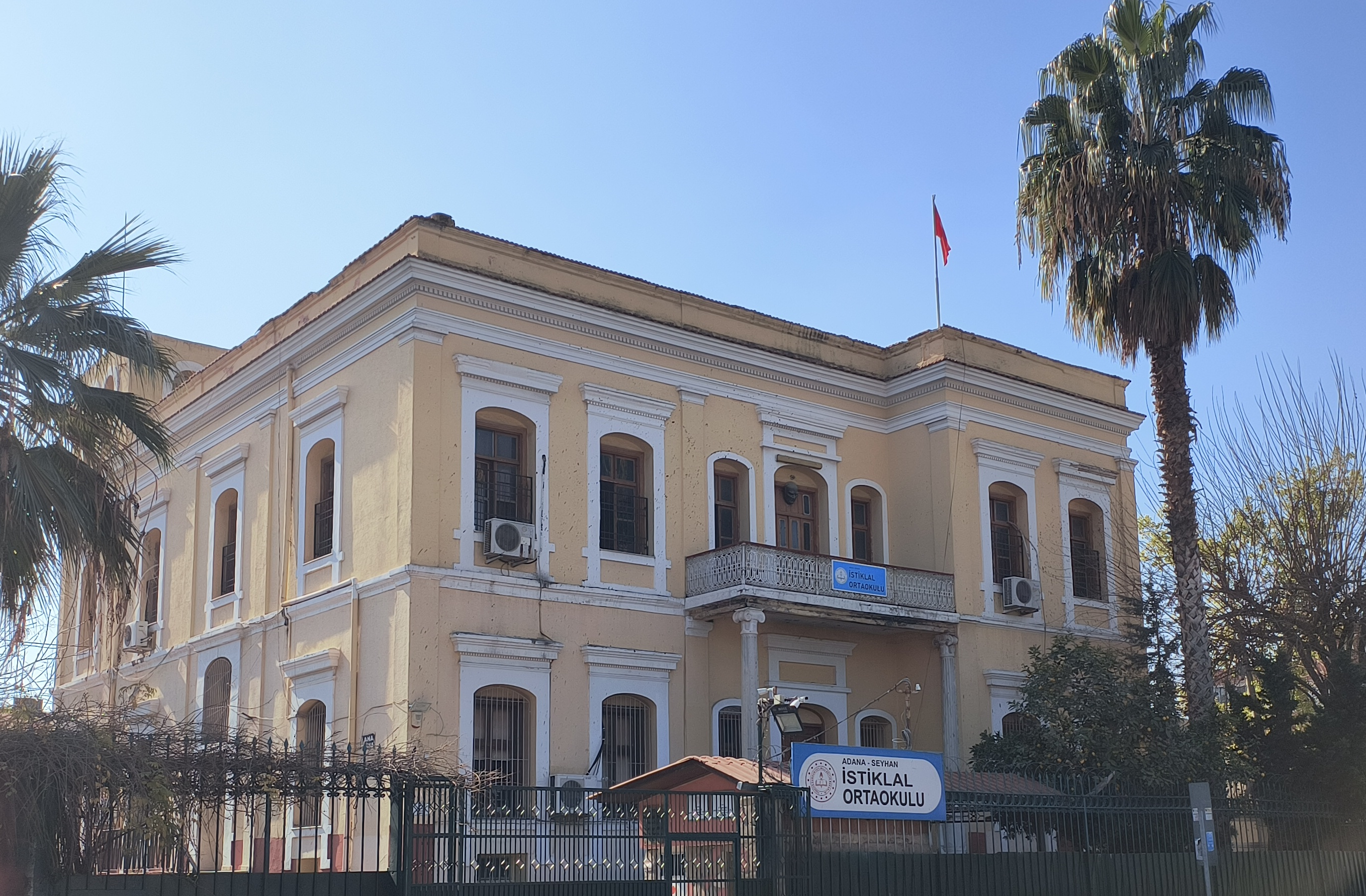
Former Greek mansion (now İstiklal Middle School)

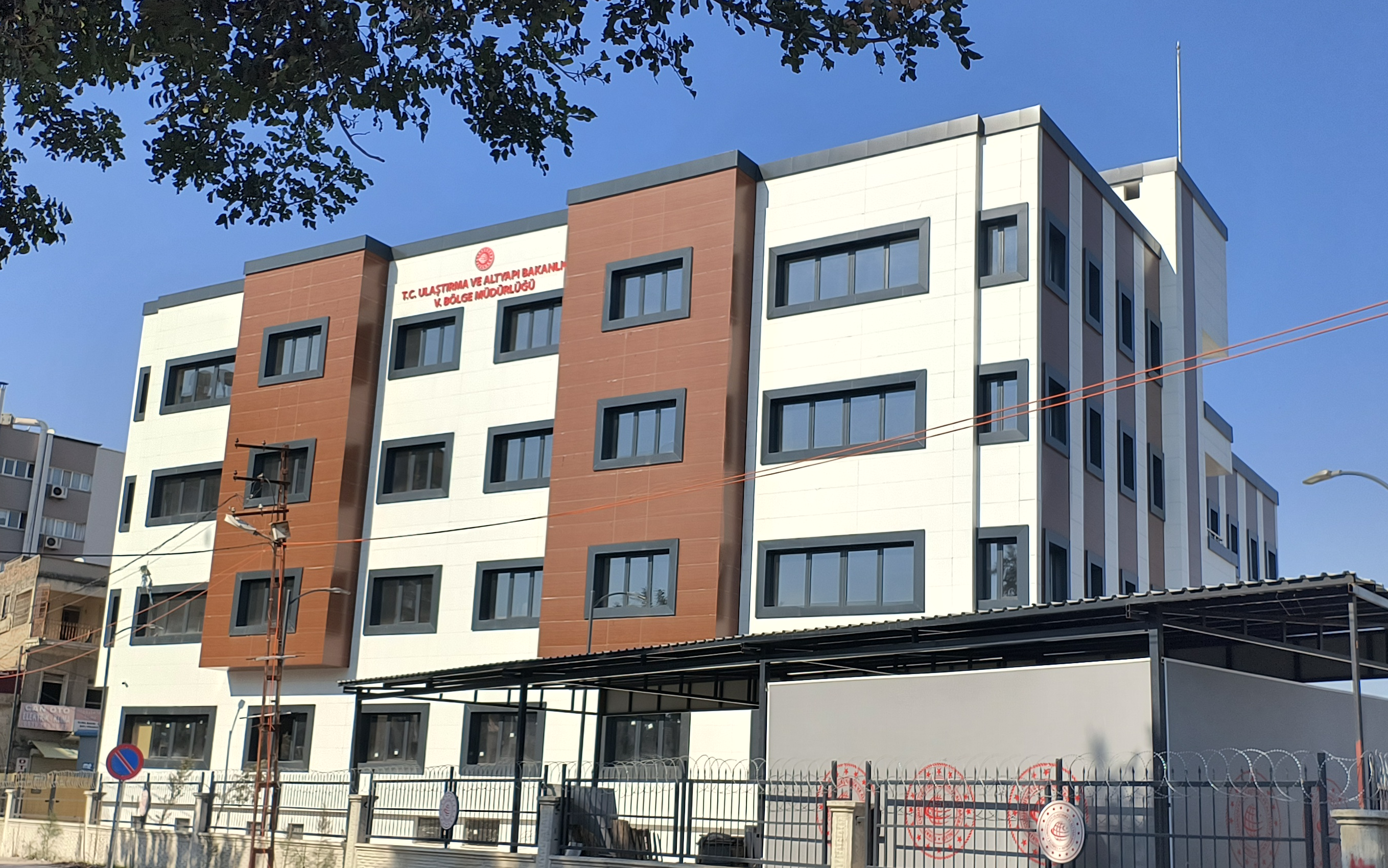
Ministry of Transportation Regional Headquarters

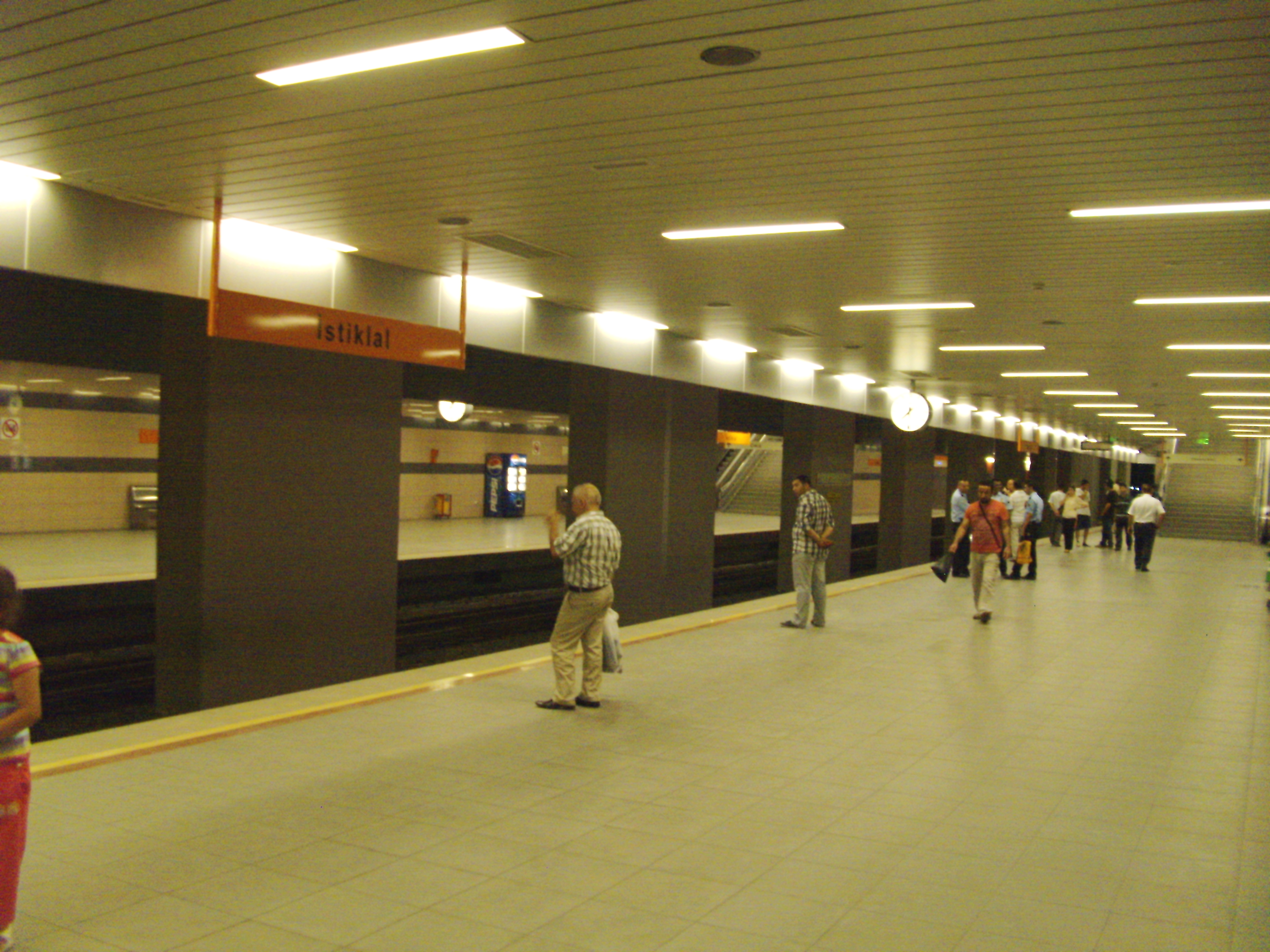
İstiklal metro station

== Economy ==
İstiklal is a middle-class neighborhood. Once a manufacturing zone of Adana, the neighborhood was home to Turkey's first textile factories.

== Transport ==
İstiklal station of the Adana Metro is steps away from the İstiklal neighborhood.

Şakirpaşa railway station is 2 km northwest of the neighborhood, one block north of the D400 State road.

Şakirpaşa Airport is 1 km west of the neighborhood at a walking distance.
