= Salmanbəyli =

- Municipality
- Location within Azerbaijan Location within Karabakh Economic Region
- Coordinates: 39°58′50″N 47°22′40″E
- Country: Azerbaijan
- Rayon: Aghjabadi

Population
  - Total: 2,132
- Time zone: UTC+4 (AZT)
  - Summer (DST): UTC+5 (AZT)

Salmanbəyli (also, Salmanbeyli and Salmanbeyly) is a village and municipality in the Aghjabadi Rayon of Azerbaijan. It has a population of 2,132 inhabitants.
