= Gökçeler, Seyhan =

Gökçeler
- Neighbourhood
- Location within Turkey
- Coordinates: 36.9678°N 35.1103°E
- Country: Turkey
- Province: Adana
- District: Seyhan
- Population (2022): 1,204
- Time zone: UTC+3 (TRT)

Villagers in Gökçeler, Seyhan-Adana, Turkey

Gökçeler is a neighbourhood in the municipality and district of Seyhan, Adana Province, Turkey. Its population is 1,204 (2022).
