= Sabancı Cultural Center =

Cultural center in Adana, Turkey

Coordinates: 36°59′26″N 35°19′53″E

Hacı Ömer Sabancı Cultural Center
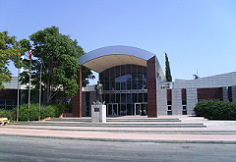
- Interactive map of Hacı Ömer Sabancı Cultural Center
- Address: Fuzuli Caddesi No:2; Adana; Turkey
- Owner: Republic of Turkey
- Capacity: 368 (theater hall)
- Type: Cultural complex
- Current use: Theatre, Fine Arts Gallery, Library, Exhibition Hall

Construction
- Opened: 1976

Hacı Ömer Sabancı Cultural Center is a complex in Adana that is composed of a theatre hall, public library, fine arts gallery and an exhibition hall. It has been established on an area of 1.5 hectare, located at the west end of the Seyhan Bridge across the Sabancı Mosque.

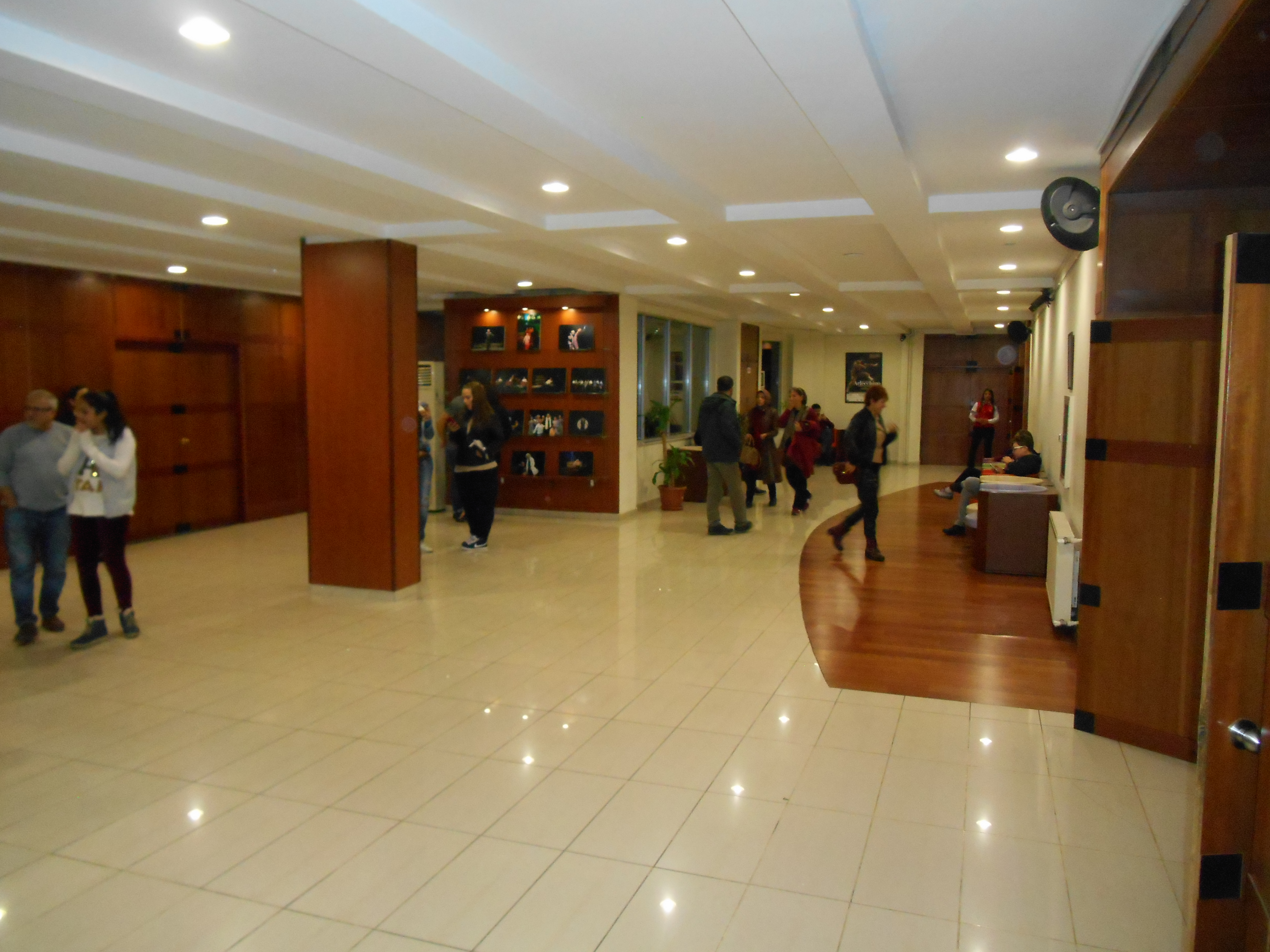
The lobby

== History ==
The Center was constructed jointly by Sabancı Holding and Turkish Education Foundation. Administration is conducted by the Ministry of Culture and Tourism since its opening in 1976. In 1981, Adana State Theatre opened its stage at the Center. It has been expanded in 1982 with the addition of the fine arts gallery (foyer, drawing and training workshop, museum holding antiques, bookstore, and gift shop) and its theater has also been expanded and furnished with new and modern equipment. The Center was last renovated in 2007 with the contributions of Sabancı Foundation.

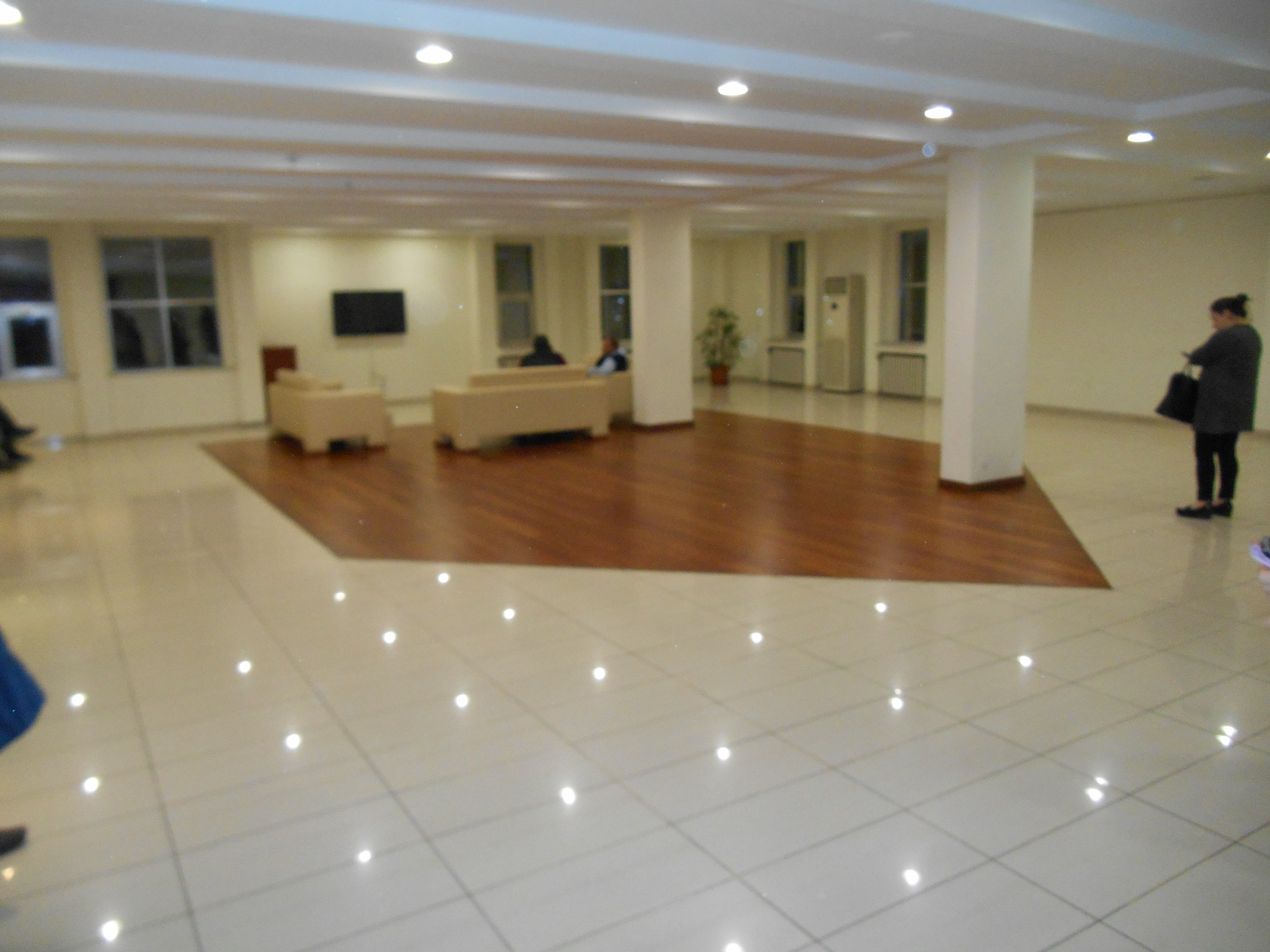
The lounge

== The Center ==
368-seater theatre hall of the Center hosts Adana State Theatre and community theater groups. Adana State Theatre performs regularly here from October to May. The theatre hall is also home of the Sabancı Theater Festival. The library of the Center has a capacity of 200 seats and it is open all throughout the year. There is also a fine arts gallery and an exhibition hall in the center.
