= Dərvişlər =

- Municipality
- Location within Azerbaijan
- Coordinates: 39°29′51″N 44°58′06″E
- Country: Azerbaijan
- Autonomous republic: Nakhchivan
- District: Sharur

Population (2005)
  - Total: 568
- Time zone: UTC+4 (AZT)

Dərvişlər (also, Darvishlyar and Dervishlyar) is a village and municipality in the Sharur District of Nakhchivan Autonomous Republic, Azerbaijan. It is located 5 km in the south from the district center, on the bank of the Arpachay River, on the Sharur plain. Its population is busy with grain-growing, vine-growing, foddering, tobacco-growing and animal husbandry. There are secondary school, library, club and a medical center in the village. It has a population of 568.

== Etymology ==
It is an Ethno-toponymy. The settlement was founded by the settling of the generation of Dervishes in here. Dərvişlər means (Dervishes).
