= Sarıhuğlar, Seyhan =

Sarıhuğlar
- Neighbourhood
- Location in Turkey
- Coordinates: 37°0′58″N 35°13′37″E
- Country: Turkey
- Province: Adana
- District: Seyhan
- Population (2022): 339
- Time zone: UTC+3 (TRT)

Sarıhuğlar is a neighbourhood in the municipality and district of Seyhan, Adana Province, Turkey. Its population is 339 (2022).
