= Dervişler, Seyhan =

Dervişler
- Neighbourhood
- Location in Turkey
- Coordinates: 36.8279°N 35.1995°E
- Country: Turkey
- Province: Adana
- District: Seyhan
- Population (2022): 236
- Time zone: UTC+3 (TRT)

Dervişler is a neighbourhood in the municipality and district of Seyhan, Adana Province, Turkey. Its population is 236 (2022).
