= Adana Center for Arts and Culture =

Adana Center for Arts & Culture
- Adana Kültür Sanat Merkezi
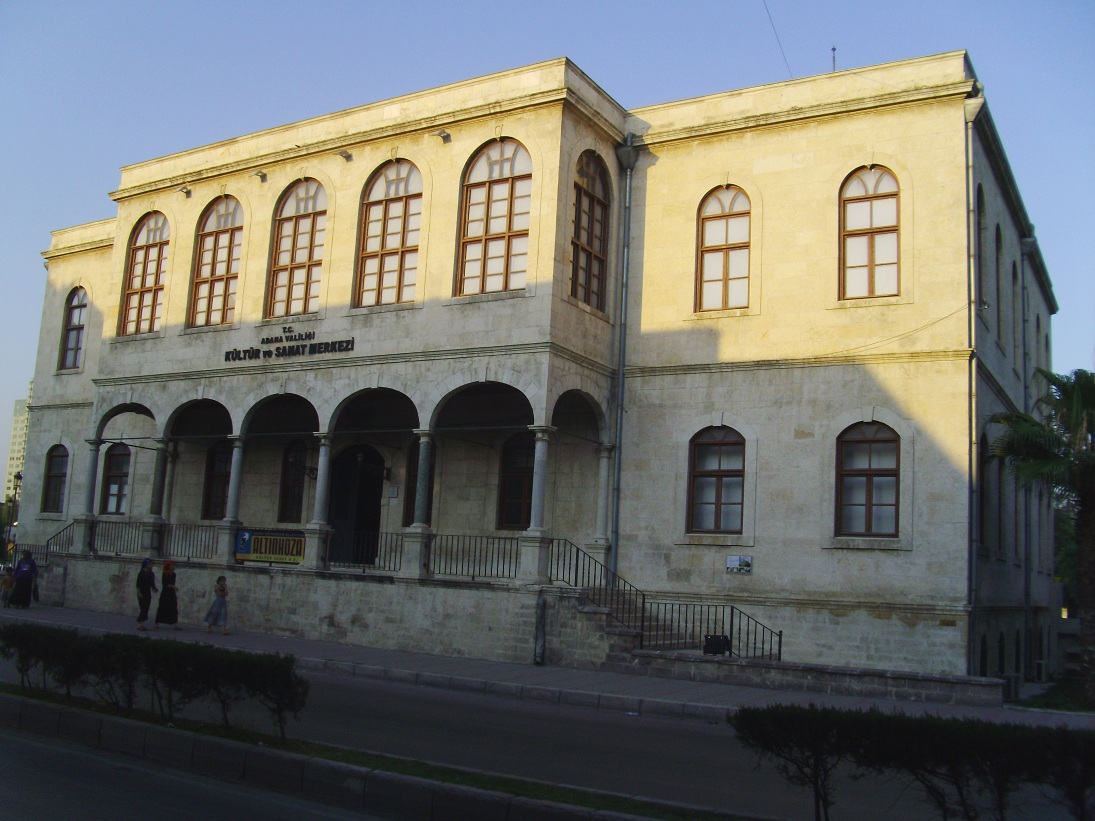
- Interactive map of the Adana Center for Arts & Culture area
- Former names: Mekteb-i İdadi, Adana Sultani, Adana Erkek Lisesi, Adana Kız Lisesi
- Alternative names: The Historical High School for Girls

General information
- Type: State Building
- Architectural style: Ottoman, Ampire
- Location: Adana, Turkey, Seyhan Street
- Coordinates: 36°59′04″N 35°20′01″E
- Current tenants: Adana Metropolitan Municipality
- Construction started: 1881
- Completed: 1885
- Owner: Adana Governorship

Technical details
- Floor count: 3

Adana Center for Arts and Culture is a public facility for cultural events, operating at the historical state building of Adana that served as a school for most of its history. The center is located on the west bank of Seyhan River just south of the Taşköprü, on Seyhan Street.

== History ==
During the reign of sultan Abdülhamit II, the Ottoman government decided to build a Military Middle School (Askeri Rüştiye) on the river bank close to the Vilayet Square. The construction of the building started in 1881 by the governor Abidin Paşa and was completed in 1885. The building was designed as a state building and was one of the highest buildings in Adana at the time. Although the building was constructed to be a Military Middle School, it was converted into a 5-year Military High School (Mekteb-i İdadi) at its opening in 1885 and then to an 8-year Mekteb-i İdadi. During the 1894–1895 academic year, a kitchen and a dining hall are added to the building to accommodate the boarding students.

The building was used a military depot during World War I, and after the French occupation, it became the Adana Sultani (Ottoman High School). After the foundation of the Republic, the building served as the High School for Boys for a period and in 1934, it was converted into Adana High School for Girls. Continuing this function until 1998, the building was damaged at the earthquake and vacated immediately after. The building was vacant until the start of the restorations in 2005. Restorations were completed in 2006 and the building was opened to the public as the Adana Center for Arts and Culture. It is currently hosting the events of the community organizations at its conference and exhibition halls.

== Architecture ==
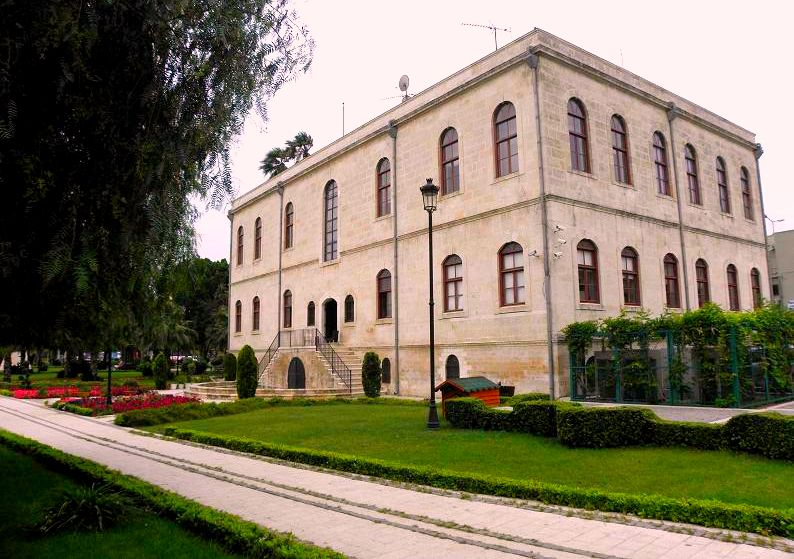
View of the Center from the river

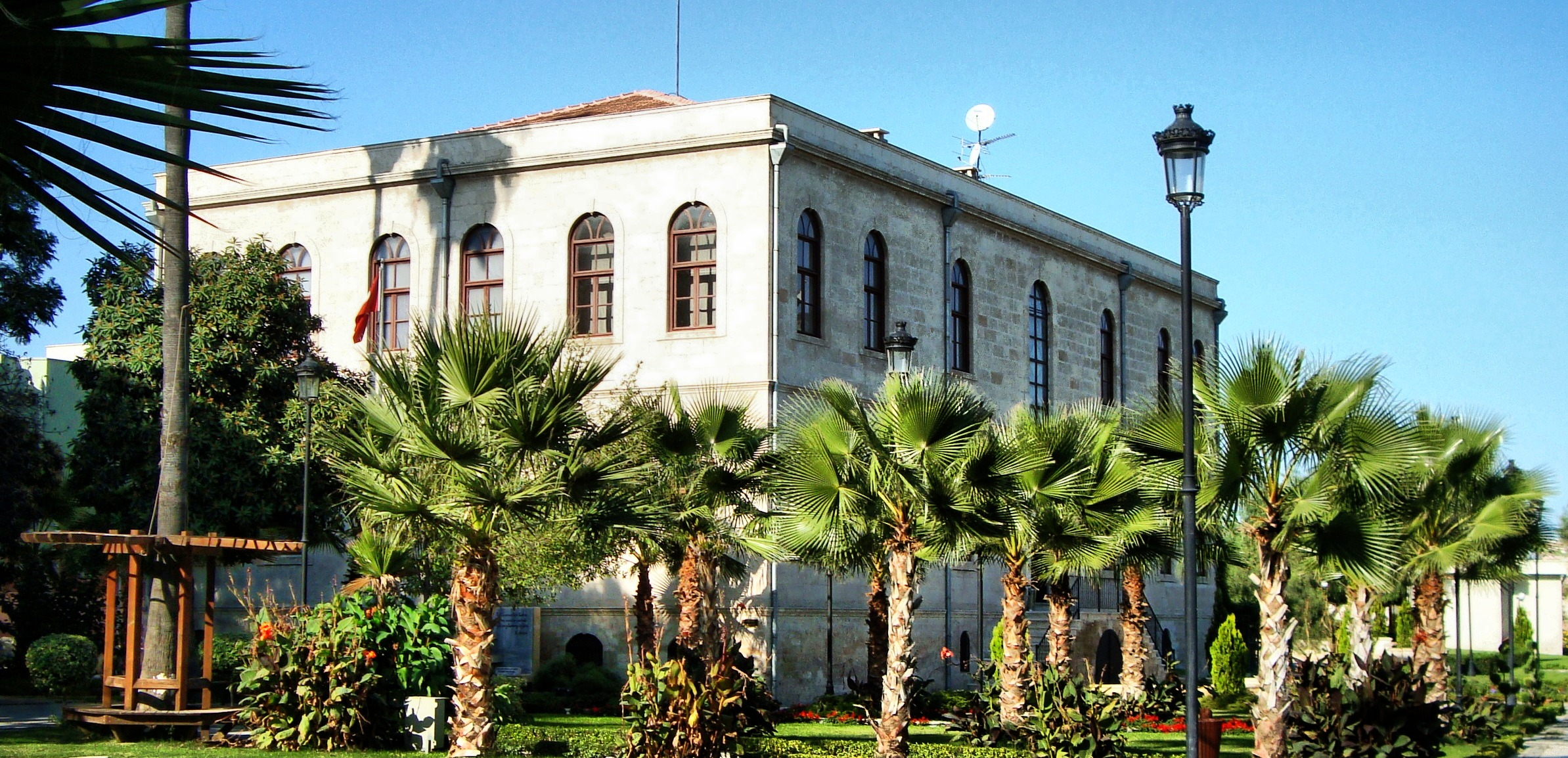
View of the Center from north

The building was like a waterside mansion in which the backyard used to extend to the river. After its conversion into a cultural center, the walls surrounding the backyard were removed, and the backyard became part of the green area along the river. It is a 3-story plain structure building made of hewn stone. On the front side, the elevated platform with the elegant columns is built as a projection which gives a symmetry and a government building image to the building. The building has an empire style with the plain view, window frames and the moldings. Entrance platform used to be connected to the ground level with wide circular stairs, but these stairs were removed during the widening of the street and the side stairs designated to be the entrance. The basement of the building has a lower ceiling than the other floors. This is to prevent flooding of the building which is just next to the river and also to avoid the ground floor not to rise too high from the ground. The proximity of the building to the Taşköprü and being also made of hewn stone strengthens the ideas on the architectural history of Adana.

=== Internal design ===
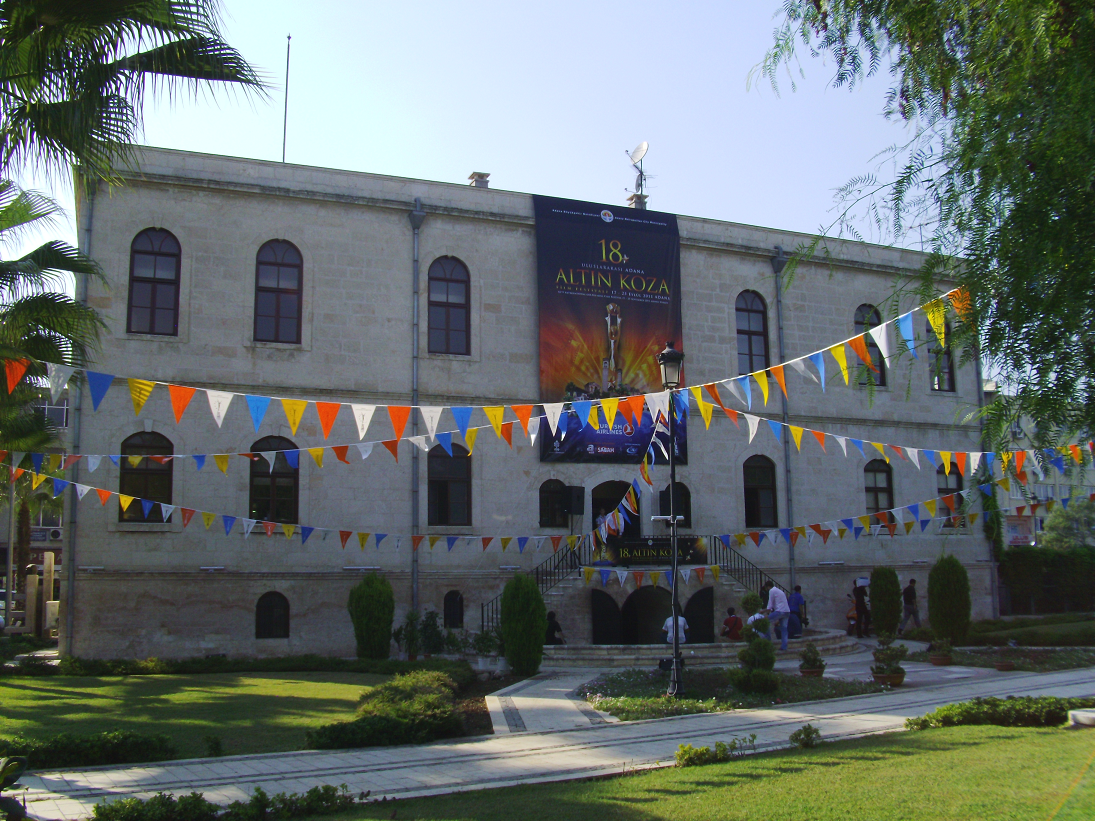
The Center hosting Altın Koza Film Festival

The common character of the floors of the building, which is made up of two main floors and a basement, is that they all have rooms that open to a large hall. The hall is T-shaped at the ground and rectangular at the upper floor. These halls act as foyers, the one at the ground floor currently exhibiting plastic works of art. The wood stairs that connect the floor are lit with the windows that look to the river. At the upper floor, besides the exhibition and the meeting halls, there is also a room with a river view which is designated as a lounge for the city officials and their guests. The basement has a separate entrance from the river side. Having stone floors, the basement is designated for servicing and storage.

== Function ==
The center acts as a place to create platform for cultural activities, and having well equipped halls, conferences, talks and movie theaters can be held. Other than the rooms that are used as administration offices on the ground floor, a room is designated as an authentic classroom in dedication to the high school for girls which occupied the building for 65 years. The room resembles an active class environment with the teacher's desk, class book, student desks and bulletin boards on the walls. On the glass bulletin boards, the pictures of the students and the teachers of the high school take one to a journey to the history. At the upper floor 150-seater conference room, the movie theater and the meeting room host several activities including the regular practices of the Turkish Arts Music Choir.
