= Salmanbeyli, Seyhan =

Salmanbeyli
- Neighbourhood
- Location within Turkey
- Coordinates: 36°51′N 35°13′E
- Country: Turkey
- Province: Adana
- District: Seyhan
- Population (2022): 275
- Time zone: UTC+3 (TRT)

Salmanbeyli is a neighbourhood in the municipality and district of Seyhan, Adana Province, Turkey. Its population is 275 (2022).

The neighbourhood is populated by Alawites
