= Reşatbey =

- Neighbourhood
- Location in Turkey
- Coordinates: 36°59′40″N 35°19′38″E
- Country: Turkey
- Province: Adana
- District: Seyhan

Government
  - Muhtar: Behzat Efe Şeker
- Elevation: 20 m (66 ft)
- Population (2022): 11,751
- Time zone: UTC+3 (TRT)
- Area code: 0322

Reşatbey (Turkish pronunciation: [ɾeʃatbej]) is a neighbourhood (mahalle) in the municipality and district of Seyhan, Adana Province, Turkey. Its population is 11,751 (2022). The neighbourhood is part of the downtown, situated north of the D400 state road and west of the Seyhan River.

== Governance ==
Reşatbey is a mahalle and it is administered by the Muhtar and the Seniors Council.

== Demographics ==
Most of the residents of Reşatbey are from families that live in Adana for several generations.

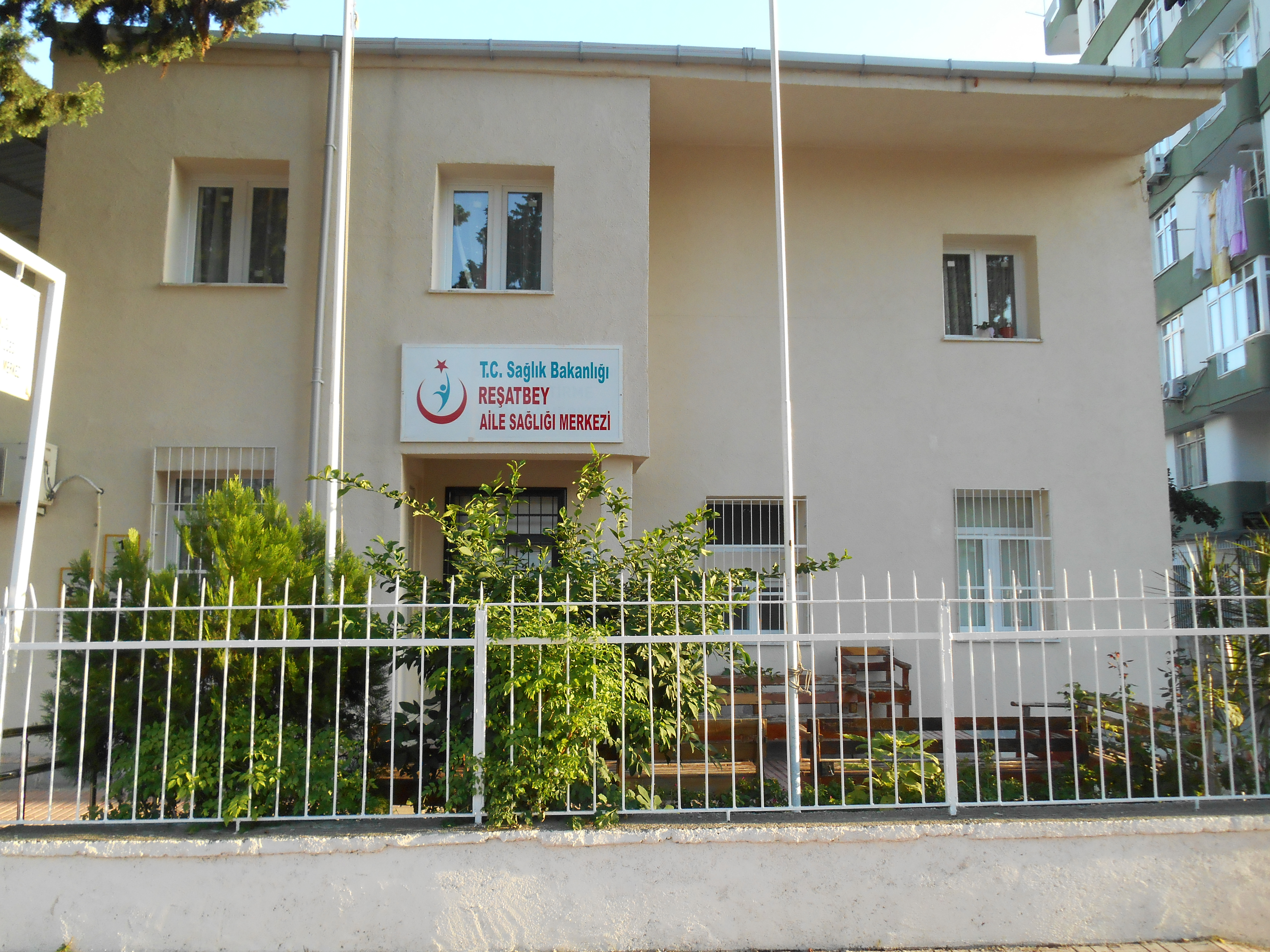
Reşatbey Community Health Centre

== Economy ==
Reşatbey is a wealthy neighbourhood, resided by many business owners and farmers. Education levels are higher than most of the neighborhoods of Adana. Adana Provincial Municipality, Ministry of Forestry Provincial Headquarters are located within the neighborhood.

== Transport ==
Şakirpaşa Airport is 3 km west of the neighborhood and can accessed by Bus #159.

Adana Central railway station is 1 km north of the neighborhood, at the Kurtuluş neighborhood.

Adana Metropolitan Municipality Bus Department (ABBO) has bus routes from Reşatbey to most of the neighborhoods of Adana.
