= Yolçatı–Tatvan railway =

Railway in Turkey

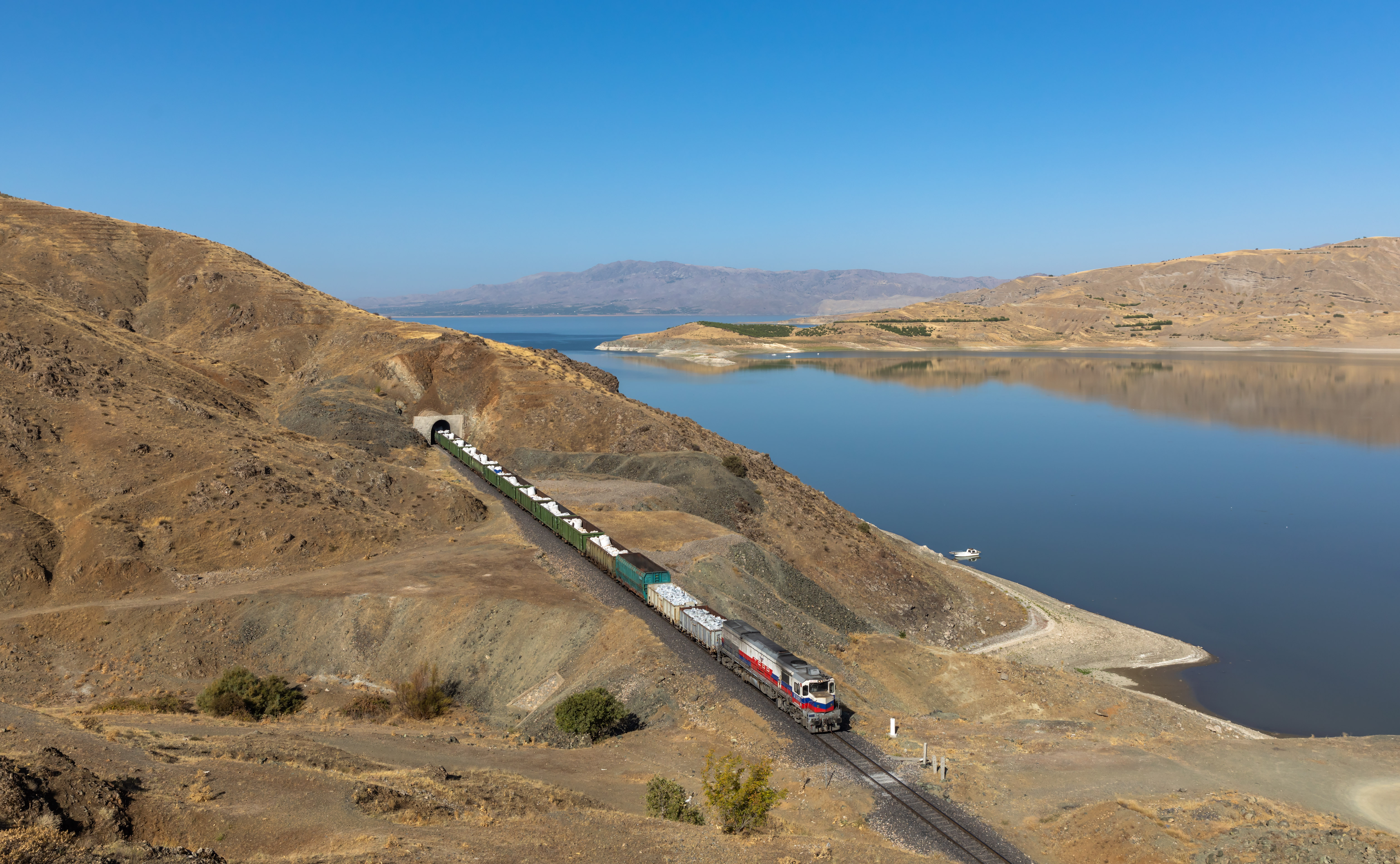

Overview
- Native name: Yolçatı–Tatvan demiryolu
- Status: Operating
- Owner: Turkish State Railways
- Locale: Eastern Anatolia
- Termini: Yolçatı, Turkey; Tatvan, Turkey

Service
- Type: Heavy rail
- System: Turkish State Railways
- Operator(s): TCDD Taşımacılık; Körfez Ulaştırma

History
- Opened: 1964

Technical
- Line length: 374 km (232 mi)
- Num of tracks: Single track
- Track gauge: 1,435 mm (4 ft 8 1/2 in) standard gauge
- Electrification: no
- Operating speed: 80 km/h (50 mph)
- Signalling: manual (Telefonla Merkezden Idare)

The Yolçatı–Tatvan railway (Turkish: Yolçatı–Tatvan demiryolu) is a 374 km railway in Turkey, connecting the Adana Malatya Diyarbakir railway to Tatvan. In Tatvan, the railway give connection to a train ferry that crosses the lake to Van. In Van, the ferry connects to a railway line to Iran.

This line was built by the Turkish states railways in sections from 1934 to 1964. Its route was changed three times to accommodate for the building of several dams, resulting in an increase in length over time of about 10 km end to end.

== Infrastructure and route ==
Starting from Yolçatı, the railway goes north to reach Elazığ almost in a straight line, going downhill. Elazığ is the first major town on the line. From there, the line turns east and continue to go downhill to reach the shore of a lake formed by the Keban Dam. It skirts the south shore of this lake until a bridge near the city of Muratbağı. The line follows the Murat River for about 160 km until Kurt. From Muratbağı to Palu, the line is on the right bank of the river. It then crosses the river on a metallic bridge to return to the left bank of the Murat River until the end. This valley is very narrow, almost like a gorge and running slightly uphill. It required many tunnels. From Kurt, the line enters the valley of the Karasu Irmağı river, a small tributary of the Murat river. This valley is about 10 km wide with a flat bottom. The line keeps to the south side to arrive into the city Muş, the only other town of importance along the way. The line then crosses to the north side of the valley in order to gain some altitude. It makes a large loop at the feet of the Nemrut Dag, a large volcano to gain altitude. The line summit is reached at Rahova station, at 1790m altitude. Then the railway descends to Tatvan. Just before Tatvan, a 360 degree loop to ease the gradient and it arrives at 1680m in the Tatvan station. From there, a branch of 4,8 km descents further to the pier, on the lake shore, where train can be loaded onto the ferry to Van.

In total, there are 126 tunnels for a cumulative length of 50 km, this is about 13% of the line total length. Most of those tunnels are located in the narrow section of the valley, between Palu and Kurt.

The longest tunnel is 1950m long and it is located near the Lower Kaleköy Dam.

The line has several bridges. The most significant is a 650m bridge over the reservoir formed by the Lower Kaleköy Dam. It is a curved pre-stressed concrete bridge, set between two tunnels. Another bridge worth mentioning is the Keban reservoir crossing just before Muratbağı. This is a 375m straight bridge, in concrete, parallel to a road bridge than was built concurrently and at the exact same elevation. In all, there are 80 bridges measuring more than 50m.

The line is single track, standard gauge, with passing sidings which were roughly 15 km apart on average when the line was built. Some of the sidings have been lost or closed. There is a long 46 km segment without sidings between Genç and Oymapınar,and another of 38 km between Oymapınar and Kurt. The shortest sidings are about 600m long. It is not electrified and operated with diesel traction. The maximum axle loading is 22.5t.

Yolçatı–Tatvan railway

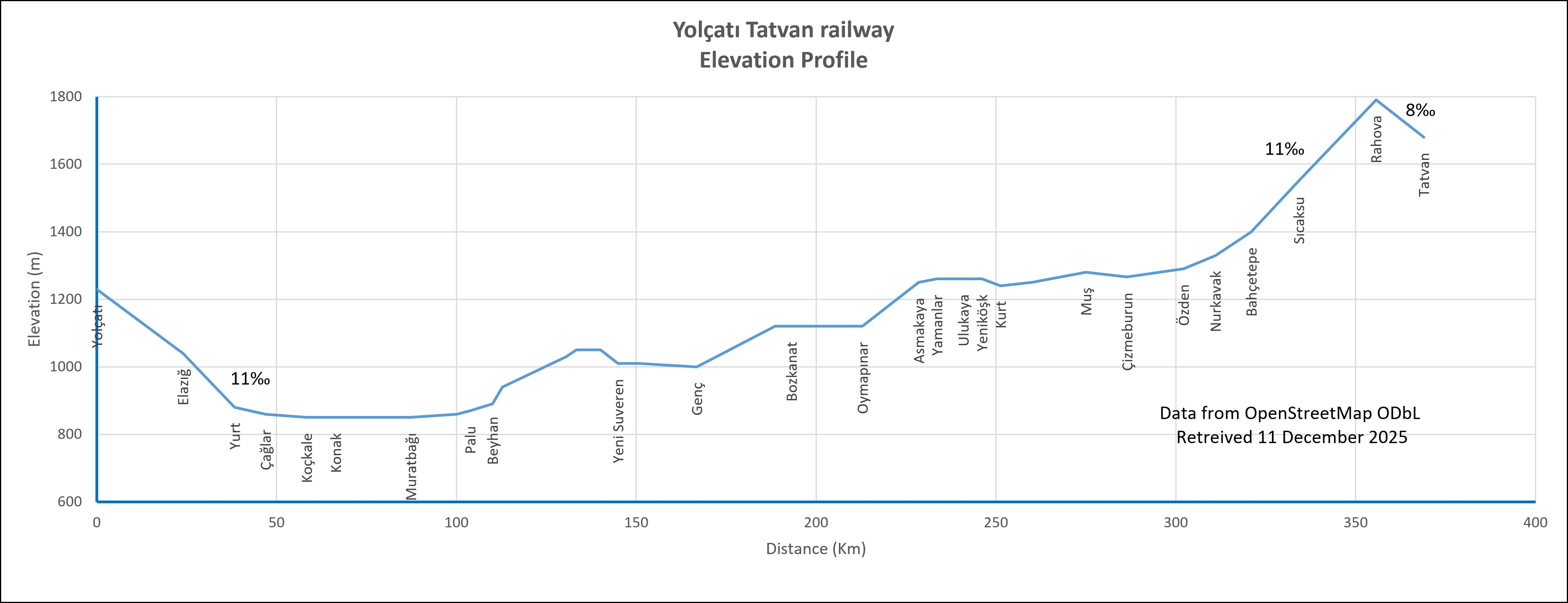
Yolcati Tatvan Railway Elevation

The sidings are in the following stations:

Station and sidings
Station	Kilometer point	Elevation	Number of sidings	Siding length (m)
Yolçatı	0.0	1230	4	1000
Elazığ	23.9	1040	6	1100
Yurt	38.3	880	4	1100
Çağlar	46.9	860	2	850
Koçkale	58.3	850	2	750
Konak	66.4	850	2	800
Muratbağı	87.3	850	4	650
Palu	103.8	870	2	600
Beyhan	112,7	940	2	600
Yeni Suveren	144.9	1010	2	1000
Genç	166,8	1000	3	750
Oymapınar	212.9	1120	2	1000
Kurt	251.3	1240	2	750
Muş	275.0	1280	5	700
Çizmeburun	286.5	1266	2	850
Özden	302.2	1290	1	790
Bahçetepe	321.0	1400	2	850
Sıcaksu	334.2	1550	2	850
Rahova	355.7	1790	1	970
Tatvan	369.0	1680	6	850

The line is operated under manual signaling (Telefonla Merkezden Idare). The trains proceeds from station to station under written train orders transmitted by a line dispatcher. Some stations are protected by a semaphore signal.

== Traffic ==
The line does not serve any town of importance, nor any industry along its way. The stations are built in agricultural villages and the whole area is very sparsely populated. The exception is a very large chrome mine near Muratbağı. This facility alone has the capacity to generate a million tons a year, and two trains per day, per direction, every day. In addition to this factory, the line serves a cement and building material near Elazığ and a small petrol terminal near Koçkale. There is also through traffic to Tatvan, Van and beyond to Iran.

The line is also served by a long-distance passenger trains:

- Van Gölü Ekspresi

== History ==
The Turkish Republic's intention to build a line to Iran was first announced by Ali Çetinkaya during a speech he made on November 13, 1935. He was minister of Public Works at this time. However the path from intent to reality was long and complex.

The very first segment of the line was a branch to Elazığ on the Malatya Kurtalan main line. The representatives of Elazığ actively lobbied in Ankara for this main line to go through their town. As this was not technically possible, they obtained a branch instead. It was quickly built thought mostly flat terrain and Elazığ got its railway station in 1934.

The next section from Elazığ to Genç was more complex and was delayed by World War II. Works eventually started and this section was inaugurated 30 November 1947. The third section to Muş was completed in 1955. This final leg to Tatvan received support from the CENTO organization. The line to Iran gained strategic status and the USA provided the finance and the support for its completion. The line was completed in 1964.

Line opening date
Section	Opening date
Yolçatı to Elazığ	1934
Elazığ to Genç	30 November 1947
Genç to Muş	1955
Muş to Tatvan	1964

The building of the Keban dam in 1973 created a lake that require rebuilding a section of line near Murat. the Murat station was abandoned as well as the original steel girder bridge to cross the Murat River. A second realignment of about 32 km was built and put into service in 2015 to avoid the lake created by the Beyhan-1 dam. This new alignment starts shortly after Beyhan station and finishes 5 km after Yeni Suveren station. This station replaces the original Suveren station which is now flooded.

A third major realignment of about 84 km was caused by the construction of the Aşağı Kaleköy dam and the Yukarı Kaleköy dam. The new route starts after Genç station and finishes 2 km before Kurt station. It includes a new station at Oymapınar, about mid way. This new section required major engineering with many tunnels and bridges to keep the line above the new water level. This realignment was completed in 2018.
