= Beyhan (disambiguation) =

Beyhan is a town in Palu District, Elazığ Province, Turkey.

Beyhan may also refer to:

== People ==
- Beyhan (name), a list of people with the name

== Places ==
- Beyhan I Dam, a gravity dam on the Murat River near the town of Beyhan in Palu District, Elazığ Province, Turkey
- Beyhan II Dam, a planned gravity dam on the Murat River near the village of Beyhan in Palu district, Elazığ Province, Turkey
