= Adana Şakirpaşa Airport =

Former airport of Adana, Turkey (1937–2024)

Adana Şakirpaşa Airport Adana Şakirpaşa Havalimanı
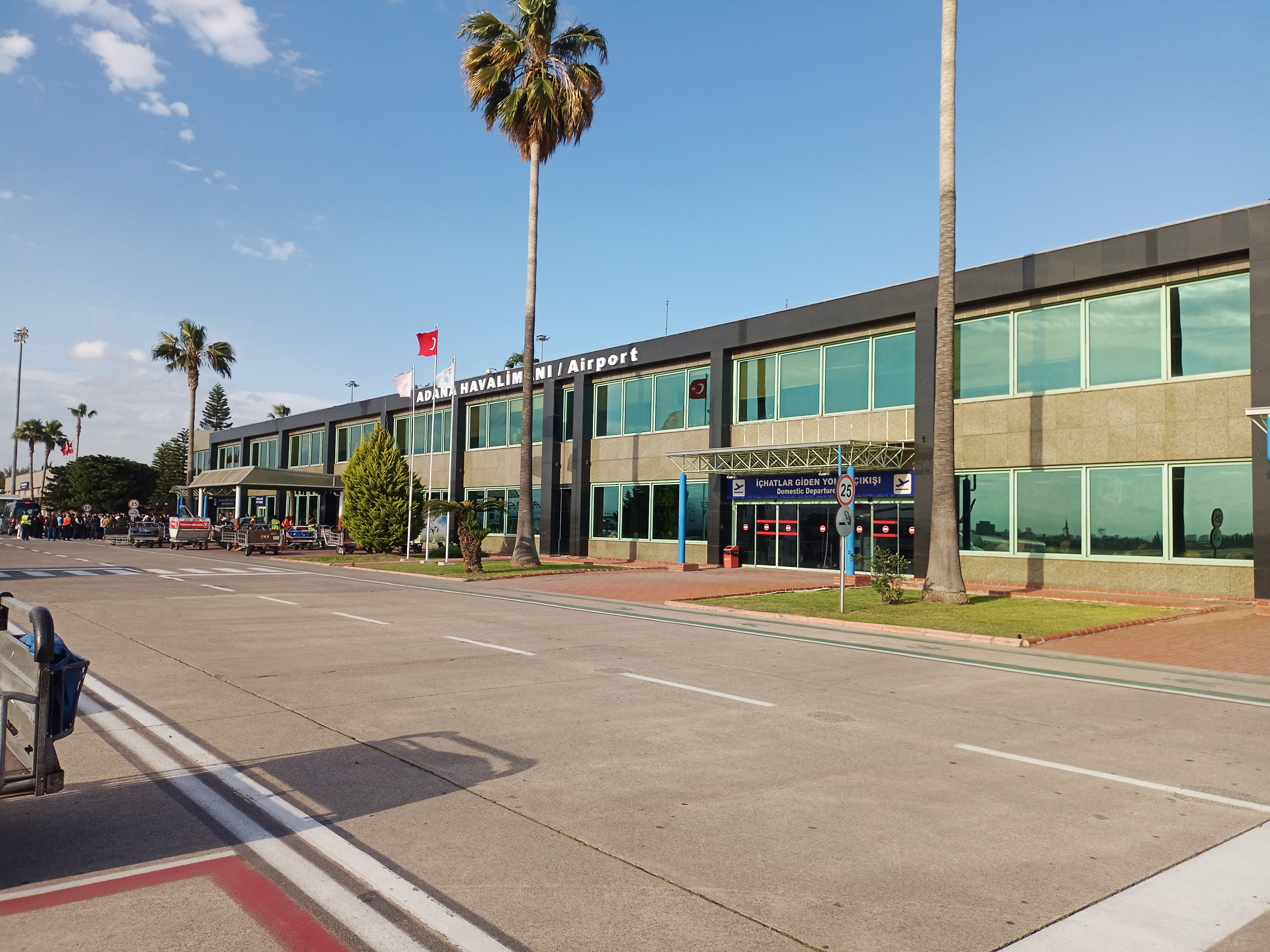
- IATA: ADA; ICAO: LTAF

Summary
- Airport type: General Aviation
- Operator: General Directorate of State Airports (DHMİ)
- Serves: Adana, Turkey
- Location: Seyhan, Adana, Turkey
- Opened: 2 October 1937; 88 years ago
- Passenger services ceased: 10 August 2024
- Elevation AMSL: 65 ft (20 m)
- Coordinates: 36°58′55″N 035°16′49″E
- Website: www.dhmi.gov.tr/Sayfalar/Havalimani/Adana/AnaSayfa.aspx

Map
- Location of airport in Turkey ADA/LTAF (Europe) ADA/LTAF (Asia)

Runways
| Direction | Length | | Surface |
| Direction | ft | m | Surface |
|---|---|---|---|
| 05/23 | 9,022 | 2,750 | Asphalt |

Statistics (2024)
- Annual passenger capacity: 3,000,000
- Passengers: 3,085,048
- Passenger change 2023–24: ▼35%
- Aircraft movements: 32,864
- Movements change 2023–24: ▼30%

Adana Şakirpaşa Airport (IATA: ADA, ICAO: LTAF) is a general aviation airport located in Adana. It served as the main commercial airport of Cilicia region from 1937 to 2024. Çukurova International Airport, which opened on 10 August 2024, replaced Şakirpaşa Airport as the regional airport. All commercial airline flights have been moved to the new airport, while Şakirpaşa Airport is now used primarily for private travel, pilot training and air sports.

== History ==
Adana Airport was constructed on farmland at the Şakirpaşa area, 2.3 km (1.4 mi) west of the historical city centre. It was opened to service as a civil-military airport in 1937, and became a full civil airport in 1956. Passenger traffic at Adana Airport has doubled since 2011, hitting a record in 2018 with 5,630,674 passengers.

== Airlines and destinations ==
The last commercial airline passenger flight departed shortly after midnight on 11 August 2024. As of 12 August 2024, there are no commercial airline passenger flights at Adana Airport.

There were 295 weekly departures to 24 routes from the Adana Airport during the high season, connecting the region to destinations in Turkey, Germany, Northern Cyprus, Lebanon, the Netherlands, Belgium, Russia, and the United Kingdom. Ercan was the shortest route (40 min.) and London was the longest route (4 hours 50 minutes). Routes to both airports in Istanbul were among the busiest in Turkey, with 144 departures weekly, equating to almost half of the total flights.

== Statistics ==
=== Passenger figures ===
Adana–Şakirpaşa Airport passenger traffic statistics
| Year | Domestic | % change | International | % change | Total | % change |
|---|---|---|---|---|---|---|
| 2024 | 2,470,928 | ▼36% | 614,120 | ▼30% | 3,085,048 | ▼35% |
| 2023 | 3,845,362 | ▲19% | 883,446 | ▲37% | 4,728,808 | ▲22% |
| 2022 | 3,228,701 | ▲8% | 645,892 | ▲53% | 3,874,593 | ▲14% |
| 2021 | 2,976,130 | ▲30% | 423,361 | ▲89% | 3,399,491 | ▲36% |
| 2020 | 2,283,292 | ▼47% | 224,052 | ▼70% | 2,547,344 | ▼50% |
| 2019 | 4,306,031 | ▼13% | 751,757 | ▲7% | 5,057,788 | ▼10% |
| 2018 | 4,929,255 | ▼1% | 701,419 | ▲8% | 5,630,674 | ▲0% |
| 2017 | 4,960,627 | ▲2% | 649,549 | ▼9% | 5,610,176 | ▲0% |
| 2016 | 4,872,365 | ▲6% | 713,337 | ▼2% | 5,585,702 | ▲5% |
| 2015 | 4,582,185 | ▲13% | 727,521 | ▲15% | 5,309,706 | ▲14% |
| 2014 | 4,057,291 | ▲8% | 630,203 | ▲12% | 4,687,494 | ▲9% |
| 2013 | 3,754,227 | ▲20% | 561,551 | ▼11% | 4,315,778 | ▲15% |
| 2012 | 3,136,143 | ▲18% | 628,014 | ▲7% | 3,764,157 | ▲16% |
| 2011 | 2,651,873 | ▲10% | 589,094 | ▲39% | 3,240,967 | ▲14% |
| 2010 | 2,417,630 | ▲17% | 423,540 | ▲2% | 2,841,170 | ▲14% |
| 2009 | 2,065,779 | ▲15% | 416,623 | ▼16% | 2,482,402 | ▲8% |
| 2008 | 1,793,675 | ▲3% | 496,752 | ▼11% | 2,290,427 | ▼1% |
| 2007 | 1,745,450 | Steady | 557,085 | Steady | 2,302,535 | Steady |

^1: 2024 statistics correspond to the first 8 months of 2024 since the opening of the airport.

=== Route statistics ===
Direct routes from Adana Airport (high season)
| City | Airport | Weekly departures (July 2024) | Airlines |
|---|---|---|---|
| Istanbul (Pendik) | Sabiha Gökçen Airport | 74 | Pegasus Airlines, AJet |
| Istanbul (Arnavutköy) | Istanbul Airport | 70 | Turkish Airlines |
| North Nicosia | Ercan Airport | 42 | AJet, Pegasus Airlines |
| Ankara | Ankara Esenboğa Airport | 21 | AJet |
| Antalya | Antalya Airport | 20 | Pegasus Airlines, SunExpress, Turkish Airlines |
| İzmir | Adnan Menderes Airport | 20 | Pegasus Airlines, SunExpress |
| Düsseldorf | Düsseldorf Airport | 8 | Pegasus Airlines, Corendon Airlines |
| Bodrum | Milas–Bodrum Airport | 7 | Pegasus Airlines |
| Beirut | Rafic Hariri International Airport | 4 | AJet, Pegasus Airlines |
| Berlin | Berlin Brandenburg Airport | 4 | SunExpress, Turkish Airlines, Eurowings |
| Stuttgart | Stuttgart Airport | 4 | SunExpress |
| Trabzon | Trabzon Airport | 4 | Pegasus Airlines |
| Cologne/Bonn | Cologne Bonn Airport | 3 | Corendon Airlines |
| Doha | Hamad International Airport | 3 | Qatar Airways |
| Frankfurt | Frankfurt Airport | 3 | SunExpress |
| Moscow | Sheremetyevo International Airport | 3 | Aeroflot |
| Van | Ferit Melen Airport | 3 | Pegasus Airlines |
| Hamburg | Hamburg Airport | 2 | Eurowings |
| Amsterdam | Amsterdam Airport Schiphol | 1 | SunExpress |
| Brussels | Brussels Airport | 1 | SunExpress |
| Hannover | Hannover Airport | 1 | SunExpress |
| London | London Stansted Airport | 1 | SunExpress |
| Munich | Munich Airport | 1 | SunExpress |
| Nuremberg | Nuremberg Airport | 1 | Corendon Airlines |

== Ground transportation ==
=== Buses and coaches ===
Adana Metropolitan Municipality local buses #135 and #159, run from the airport to the neighbourhoods of Seyhan, Çukurova and Sarıçam. Bus #159 is a 35-minute interval service that connects airport to the old town, metro (Vilayet station), Central railway station, and routes further north, ending in Kurttepe, close to the lake. Bus #135 is an hourly service to Balcalı (Çukurova University). Several local buses and minibuses that run east–west on the D400 state road, stop at the Airport intersection, 800 metres north of the airport terminals. Coach transport to the provinces surrounding Cilicia, run from the Central Coach Terminal, 3.9 km west of the airport entrance. Coach companies' shuttle services from the city centre to the Central Coach Terminal have stops at the Airport Intersection on the D400 state road.

=== Rail ===
Şakirpaşa railway station is 1.9 kilometres' walking distance to the airport terminals, and it is located one block north of the D400 state road. There are frequent train services to Mersin Central, Tarsus and Adana Central stations, and fewer daily services to eastern stations of Adana; Yüreğir, İncirlik and Ceyhan. Also from the station, there are once daily trips to Osmaniye, İskenderun, İslahiye, Karaman and Niğde.

== Accidents and incidents ==
- 1961 Turkish Airlines Ankara crash
- 1962 Turkish Airlines Taurus Mountains crash
- 7 April 1999 Turkish Airlines Flight 5904
