= Akbulut =

Akbulut is a Turkish name meaning "white cloud." It may refer to:

== People with the surname ==
- Ahmet Ziya Akbulut, Turkish painter
- Gökay Akbulut, German politician
- Oğuz Akbulut (born 1992), Turkish para-athlete
- Selman Akbulut, Turkish mathematician
- Şule Azra Akbulut (born 2003), Turkish female karateka
- Ural Akbulut, Turkish professor of chemistry
- Yıldırım Akbulut (1935–2021), Turkish politician
- Yusuf Akbulut, Syriac Orthodox priest

== Places ==
- Akbulut, Aydıntepe, a village in the district of Aydıntepe, Bayburt Province, Turkey
- Akbulut, Eldivan, a village in the district of Eldivan, Çankırı Province, Turkey
- Akbulut, Palu

== Other ==
- Akbulut cork, a structure in topology
