= Lake Gerendal =

Lake in Turkey

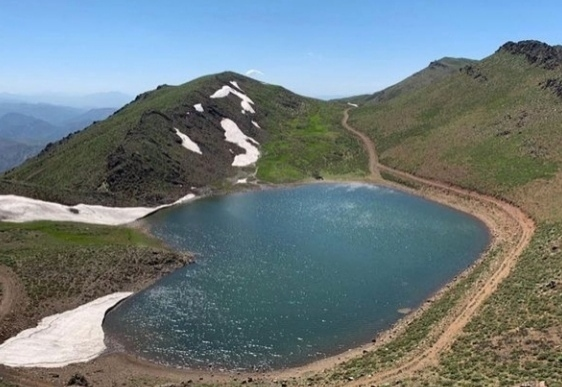

- Location within Turkey
- Location: Palu, Elazığ Province
- Coordinates: 38.829915°N 40.334301°E
- Lake type: Freshwater, Crater lake
- Basin countries: Turkey
- Surface elevation: 2.300 m (7 ft 6.6 in)

Lake Gerendal (Turkish: Gerendal Gölü); is a Crater lake in the Büyükçaltı village of Palu district of Elazığ province, Turkey. It is located 18 kilometers away from Bingöl city center.

== Geology and geography ==
Lake Gerendal is fed by snow waters.
