= Beyhan (name) =

Beyhan is a given name and surname. Notable people with the name include:

== Given name ==
- Beyhan Sultan (daughter of Selim I) (1494–1559), Ottoman princess
- Beyhan Sultan (daughter of Mehmed III), Ottoman princess
- Beyhan Sultan (daughter of Ibrahim) (1645–1700), Ottoman princess
- Beyhan Sultan (daughter of Mustafa III) (1766–1824), Ottoman princess
- Beyhan Ametov (born 1998), Macedonian footballer
- Beyhan Çalışkan (born 1960), Turkish football player and manager

== See also ==
- Beyhan (disambiguation)
