= Lower Kaleköy Dam =

- Location within Turkey
- Official name: Aşağı Kaleköy Baraji ve HEPP
- Country: Turkey
- Location: Kale, Genç, Bingöl Province
- Coordinates: 38°49′50.7″N 40°42′33.7″E
- Purpose: Power
- Status: Planned
- Owner: Kalehan Energy Generation

Dam and spillways
- Type of dam: Gravity, roller-compacted concrete
- Impounds: Murat River
- Height (foundation): 115 m (377 ft)
- Height (thalweg): 93 m (305 ft)
- Length: 504 m (1,654 ft)
- Dam volume: 2,474,000 m^{3} (3,236,000 cu yd)
- Spillway capacity: 5,773 m^{3}/s (203,900 cu ft/s)

Reservoir
- Total capacity: 516,500,000 m^{3} (418,700 acre⋅ft)

Power Station
- Type: Conventional
- Hydraulic head: 89 m (292 ft) (gross)
- Turbines: 3 x 155.5 MW, 1 x 33.5 MW Francis-type
- Installed capacity: 500 MW
- Annual generation: 965 GWh (est.)

The Lower Kaleköy Dam, also known as the Aşağı Kaleköy Dam, is a gravity dam planned on the Murat River in Genç district of Bingöl Province, eastern Turkey. Its primary purpose is hydroelectric power generation and it will support a 500 MW hydroelectric power station. The 115 m (377 ft) tall dam will withhold a reservoir of 516,500,000 m^{3} (418,700 acre⋅ft). It is owned by Kalehan Energy Generation.

== See also ==
- Upper Kaleköy Dam – under construction upstream
- Beyhan I Dam – downstream
