= Arındık =

Arındık can refer to:

- Arındık, Elâzığ
- Arındık, Palu
