= Seydili =

Seydili can refer to:

- Seydili, Palu
- Seydili, Silifke
