= Kırkbulak =

Kırkbulak can refer to:

- Kırkbulak, Palu
- Kırkbulak, Refahiye
