= Beyhan II Dam =

- Location within Turkey
- Country: Turkey
- Location: Beyhan, Palu, Elazığ Province
- Coordinates: 38°42′26.2″N 039°59′12.8″E
- Purpose: Power
- Status: Planned
- Owner: Kalehan Energy Generation

Dam and spillways
- Type of dam: Gravity
- Impounds: Murat River
- Height (foundation): 62 m (203 ft)
- Height (thalweg): 41.8 m (137 ft)
- Length: 364 m (1,194 ft)
- Dam volume: 232,000 m^{3} (303,000 cu yd)
- Spillway capacity: 10,528 m^{3}/s (371,800 cu ft/s)

Reservoir
- Total capacity: 78,920,000 m^{3} (63,980 acre⋅ft)

Power Station
- Type: Conventional
- Hydraulic head: 35 m (115 ft) (gross)
- Installed capacity: 264 MW
- Annual generation: 585 GWh (est.)

The Beyhan II Dam is a planned gravity dam on the Murat River near the village of Beyhan in Palu district, Elazığ Province, Turkey. The primary purpose of the 62 m (203 ft) tall dam is power and it supports a 264 MW hydroelectric power station. It is owned by Kalehan Energy Generation.

== See also ==
- Beyhan I Dam – upstream
