= Karasalkım, Palu =

Village in Turkey

Karasalkım
- Village
- Location in Turkey
- Coordinates: 38°36′N 39°51′E
- Country: Turkey
- Province: Elazığ
- District: Palu
- Population (2021): 703
- Time zone: UTC+3 (TRT)

Karasalkım is a village in the Palu district of Elazığ. The most commonly spoken language in the village is Turkish. The village has a population of 610 people.
