= Yakapınar railway station =

Railway station in Adana, Turkey

YAKAPINAR
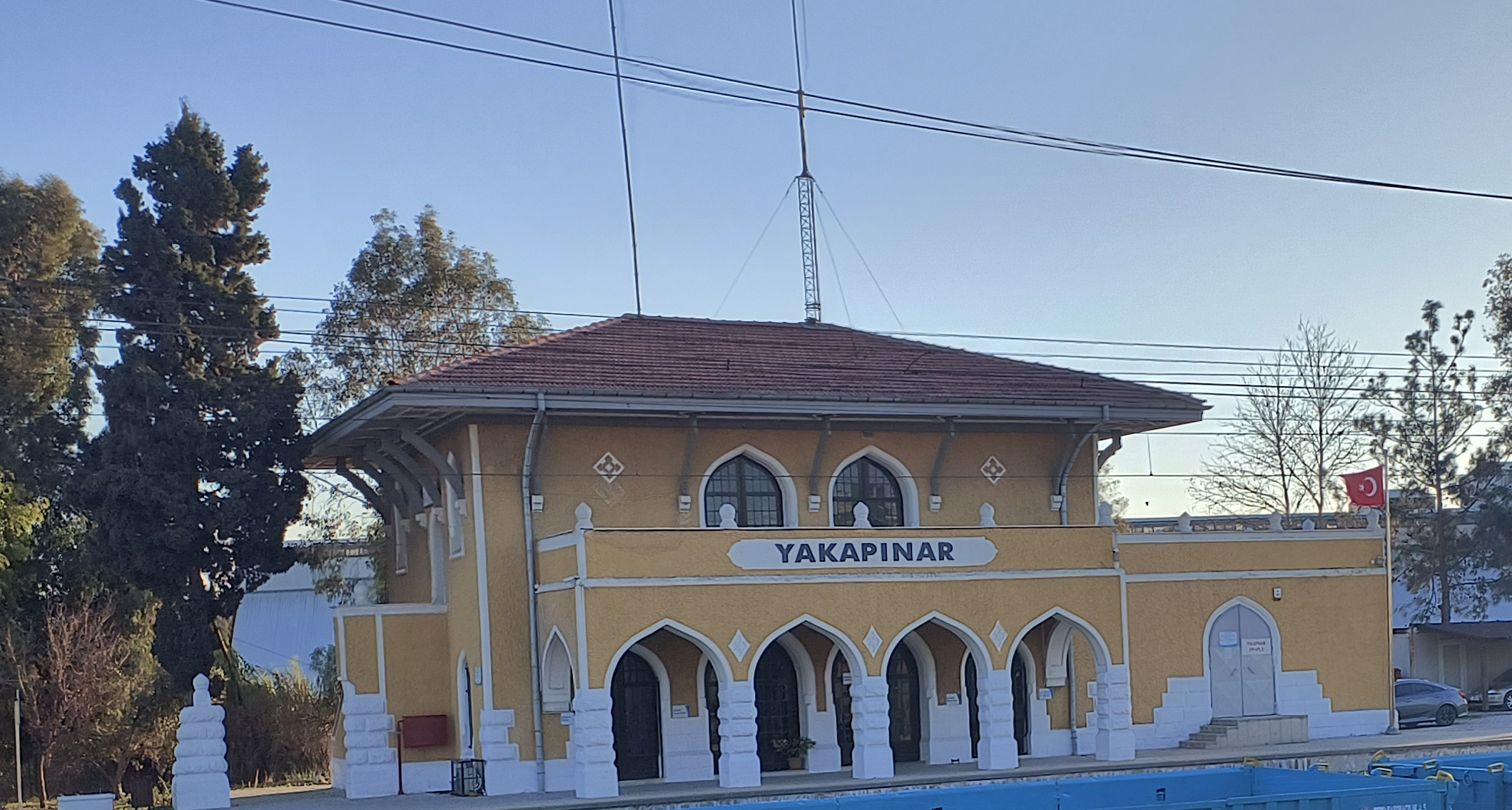

General information
- Coordinates: 36°58′03″N 35°36′45″E
- System: TCDD intercity and regional rail station
- Owner: Turkish State Railways
- Line: Adana-Aleppo railway
- Platforms: 1
- Tracks: 2

Construction
- Structure type: At-grade
- Parking: No

History
- Opened: 1912

Services
Preceding station	TCDD Taşımacılık	Following station
İncirlik towards Adana	Euphrates Express	Ceyhan towards Elazığ
İncirlik towards Mersin	Mersin–İslahiye	Ceyhan towards İslahiye
İncirlik towards Mersin	Mersin–İskenderun	Ceyhan towards İskenderun
Location

Yakapınar station is a railway station of Adana, located in the neighborhood of Yakapınar, alternatively known as Misis. The station is served by two regional and one long-distance line.

Yakapınar railway station is within the Adana Industrial Park. Misis is located south of the station.
