= Keklikdere =

Keklikdere can refer to:

- Keklikdere, Palu
- Keklikdere, Silvan
