= Kayaönü, Palu =

Village in Turkey

Kayaönü
- Village
- Location in Turkey
- Coordinates: 38°32′50″N 39°46′53″E
- Country: Turkey
- Province: Elazığ
- District: Palu
- Population (2021): 175
- Time zone: UTC+3 (TRT)

Kayaönü (Kurdish: Xamila Jêr) is a village in the Palu District of Elazığ Province in Turkey. Its population is 175 (2021).
