= Akyürek, Palu =

Village in Turkey

Akyürek
- Village
- Location in Turkey
- Coordinates: 38.6021°N 39.9191°E
- Country: Turkey
- Province: Elazığ
- District: Palu
- Population (2021): 146
- Time zone: UTC+3 (TRT)

Akyürek (Kurdish: Mehman) is a village in the Palu District of Elazığ Province in Turkey. Its population is 146 (2021).
