= Köklüce, Palu =

Village in Turkey zazaki:Qılebon

Köklüce
- Village
- Location in Turkey
- Coordinates: 38°47′6″N 40°9′43″E
- Country: Turkey
- Province: Elazığ
- District: Palu
- Population (2021): 199
- Time zone: UTC+3 (TRT)

Köklüce (Kurdish: Qêlîban) is a village in the Palu District of Elazığ Province in Turkey. Its population is 199 (2021).
