= Umutkaya, Palu =

Village in Turkey

Umutkaya
- Village
- Location in Turkey
- Coordinates: 38°42′N 40°00′E
- Country: Turkey
- Province: Elazığ
- District: Palu
- Population (2021): 82
- Time zone: UTC+3 (TRT)

Umutkaya (Kurdish: Hecîkîl) is a village in the Palu District of Elazığ Province in Turkey. Its population is 82 (2021).
