= Yarımtepe, Palu =

Village in Turkey

Yarımtepe
- Village
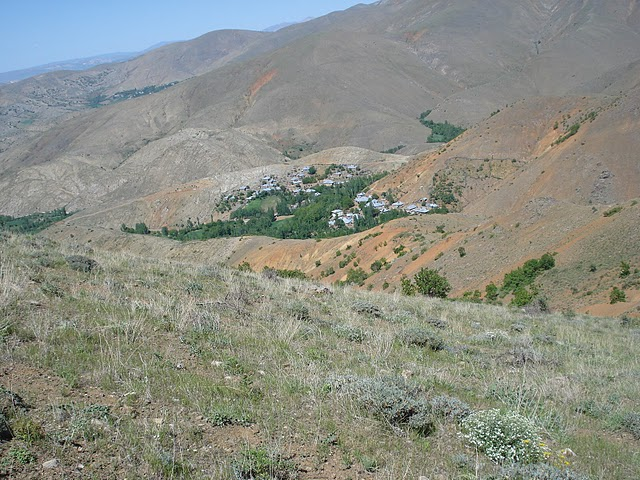

- Location within Turkey
- Coordinates: 38°37′39″N 39°59′19″E
- Country: Turkey
- Province: Elazığ
- District: Palu
- Population (2021): 100
- Time zone: UTC+3 (TRT)

Yarımtepe (Kurdish: Argat) is a village in the Palu District of Elazığ Province in Turkey. Its population is 100 (2021).
