= Tarhana, Palu =

Village in Turkey

Tarhana
- Village
- Location in Turkey
- Coordinates: 38°37′N 40°02′E
- Country: Turkey
- Province: Elazığ
- District: Palu
- Population (2021): 282
- Time zone: UTC+3 (TRT)

Tarhana (also: Tarhanaköy) is a village in the Palu District of Elazığ Province in Turkey. Its population is 282 (2021).
