= Atik, Palu =

Village in Turkey

Atik
- Village
- Location in Turkey
- Coordinates: 38°48′N 40°17′E
- Country: Turkey
- Province: Elazığ
- District: Palu
- Population (2021): 54
- Time zone: UTC+3 (TRT)

Atik (also: Atikköy) is a village in the Palu District of Elazığ Province in Turkey. Its population is 54 (2021).
