= Üçdeğirmenler, Palu =

Village in Turkey

Üçdeğirmenler
- Village
- Location in Turkey
- Coordinates: 38°38′N 39°54′E
- Country: Turkey
- Province: Elazığ
- District: Palu
- Population (2021): 420
- Time zone: UTC+3 (TRT)

Üçdeğirmenler (Kurdish: Xarpung) is a village in the Palu District of Elazığ Province in Turkey. Its population is 420 (2021). The village is populated by Kurds of the Bekiran tribe.
