= Bölükelma, Palu =

Village in Turkey

Bölükelma
- Village
- Location in Turkey
- Coordinates: 38°49′N 40°15′E
- Country: Turkey
- Province: Elazığ
- District: Palu
- Population (2021): 14
- Time zone: UTC+3 (TRT)

Bölükelma (Kurdish: Tov) is a village in the Palu District of Elazığ Province in Turkey. Its population is 14 (2021).
