= Küçükçaltı, Palu =

Village in Turkey

Küçükçaltı
- Village
- Location in Turkey
- Coordinates: 38°47′N 40°16′E
- Country: Turkey
- Province: Elazığ
- District: Palu
- Population (2021): 17
- Time zone: UTC+3 (TRT)

Küçükçaltı (Kurdish : Xêylana Biçûk) is a village in the Palu District of Elazığ Province in Turkey. Its population is 17 (2021).
