= Kiremithane railway station =

Railway station in Adana, Turkey

KİREMİTHANE
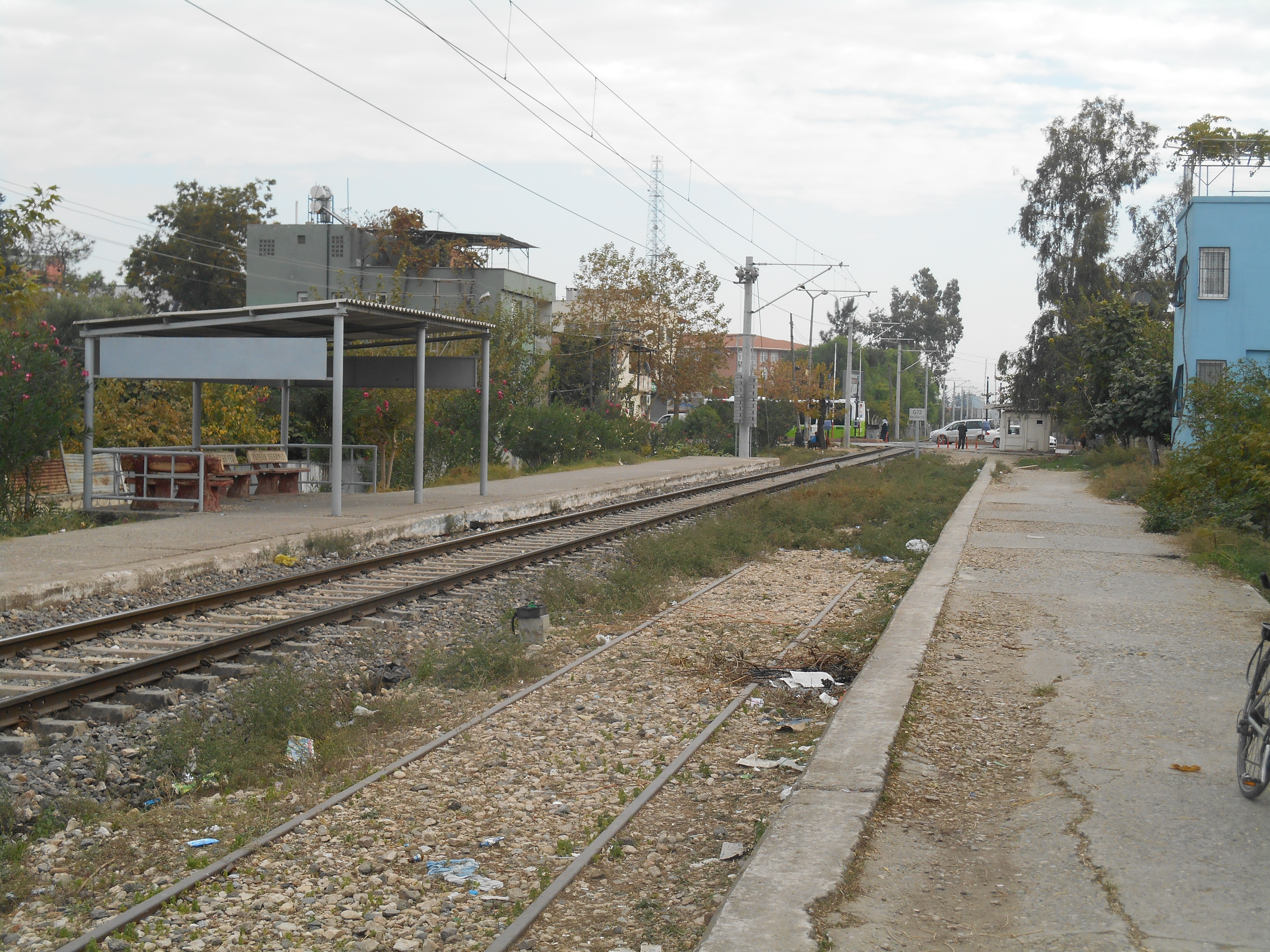

General information
- Coordinates: 37°00′01″N 35°21′49″E
- System: TCDD intercity and regional rail station
- Owner: Turkish State Railways
- Line: Adana-Aleppo railway
- Platforms: 1
- Tracks: 2

Construction
- Structure type: At-grade
- Parking: No

Services
Preceding station	TCDD Taşımacılık	Following station
Adana Terminus	Euphrates Express	İncirlik towards Elazığ
Adana towards Mersin	Mersin–İslahiye	İncirlik towards İslahiye
Adana towards Mersin	Mersin–İskenderun	İncirlik towards İskenderun
Location

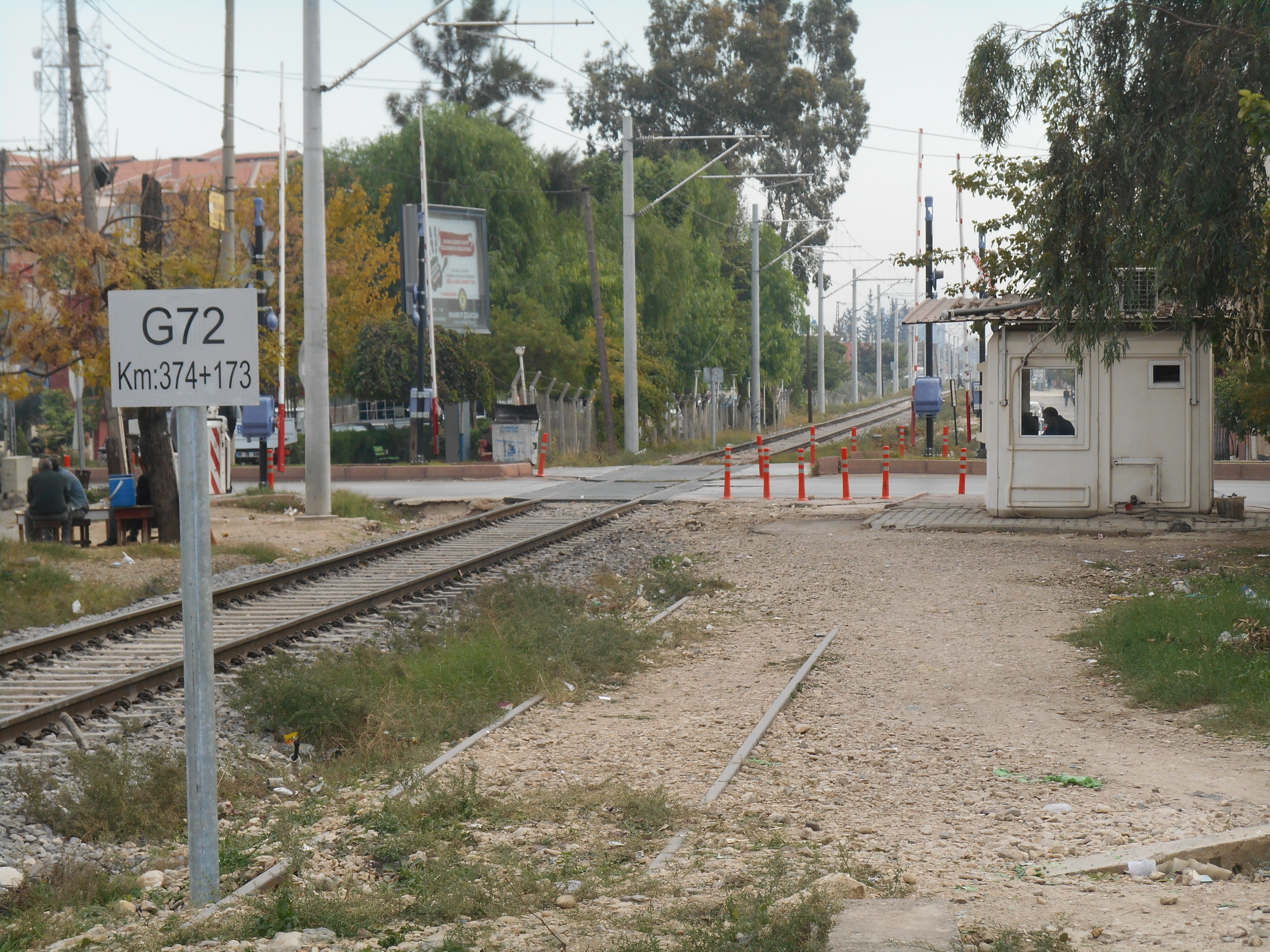
Station sign

Kiremithane station is the railway station of Yüreğir district, in the city of Adana. The station is served by one regional and one long-distance line.

The Kiremithane railway station has no station building. The only infrastructure present at the station is the waiting shelter. Tickets can be purchased inside the train, as there is no ticket booth in the station.
