= Alpaslan-2 Dam =

- Location within Turkey
- Interactive map of Alpaslan-2 Dam
- Official name: Alpaslan-2 Baraji
- Country: Turkey
- Location: Muş Province
- Coordinates: 39°02′07″N 41°31′06″E
- Purpose: Power, irrigation
- Status: Operational
- Construction began: 2012
- Opening date: 2021
- Owner: Enerjisa Power Generation Inc.
- Operator: Energo-Pro

Dam and spillways
- Type of dam: Embankment, rock-fill with clay-core
- Impounds: Murat River
- Height: 116 m (381 ft)
- Length: 844 m (2,769 ft)
- Elevation at crest: 1,371 m (4,498 ft)
- Dam volume: 12,450,000 m^{3} (16,283,985 cu yd)
- Spillway type: Controlled chute, 6 radial gates
- Spillway capacity: 7,542 m^{3}/s (266,343 cu ft/s)

Reservoir
- Creates: Alpaslan-2 Reservoir
- Total capacity: 2,431,000,000 m^{3} (1,970,844 acre⋅ft)
- Normal elevation: 1,368 m (4,488 ft)

Power Station
- Commission date: 2020-2021
- Hydraulic head: 93.32 m (306 ft) (rated)
- Turbines: 2 x 110 MW, 2 x 30 MW Francis-type
- Installed capacity: 280 MW
- Annual generation: 850 GWh

The Alpaslan-2 Dam is an embankment dam on the Murat River in Muş Province, Turkey. The dam is located about 32 km (20 mi) north of the provincial capital, Muş. The primary purpose of the dam is hydroelectric power production and irrigation. Its power station has an installed capacity of 280 MW, planning to deliver 850 GWh annually, and the reservoir will help irrigate 78,000 ha (190,000 acres) of land.

== Timeline ==
Enerjisa Power Generation Inc. acquired the license for the power station from Özışık İnsaat & Enerji in April 2011 and Yenigün Construction started excavating the diversion tunnels May 2012. In late May 2013 Pöyry was awarded the detailed design of the dam, power station, spillway and switch yard.

Enerjisa initially planned the diversion tunnels to be complete by the end of 2012, and the whole project by 2016. Construction progress however has been heavily delayed. Construction was indeed interrupted during a year (2016-2017).

In 2017, after a year of negotiation, the half-built stalled project was transferred to a new contractor, Czech group Energo-Pro (cs), for completion and operation of the dam, with a concession running until 2059. A definitive financing plan was signed as late as November 2019, with Energo-Pro investing a total €175 million.

Alpaslan-2 power station was connected to the grid in November 2020, and fully commissioned in April 2021.

== See also ==
- Alpaslan-1 Dam – sister dam upstream, completed in 2009
- Upper Kaleköy Dam – downstream, completed in 2018
