= Andılar, Palu =

Village in Turkey

Andılar
- Village
- Location in Turkey
- Coordinates: 38°40′N 40°03′E
- Country: Turkey
- Province: Elazığ
- District: Palu
- Population (2021): 158
- Time zone: UTC+3 (TRT)

Andılar (Kurdish: Sikam) is a village in the Palu District of Elazığ Province in Turkey. Its population is 158 (2021).
