= Turkish Airlines Flight 835 =

1961 aviation accident

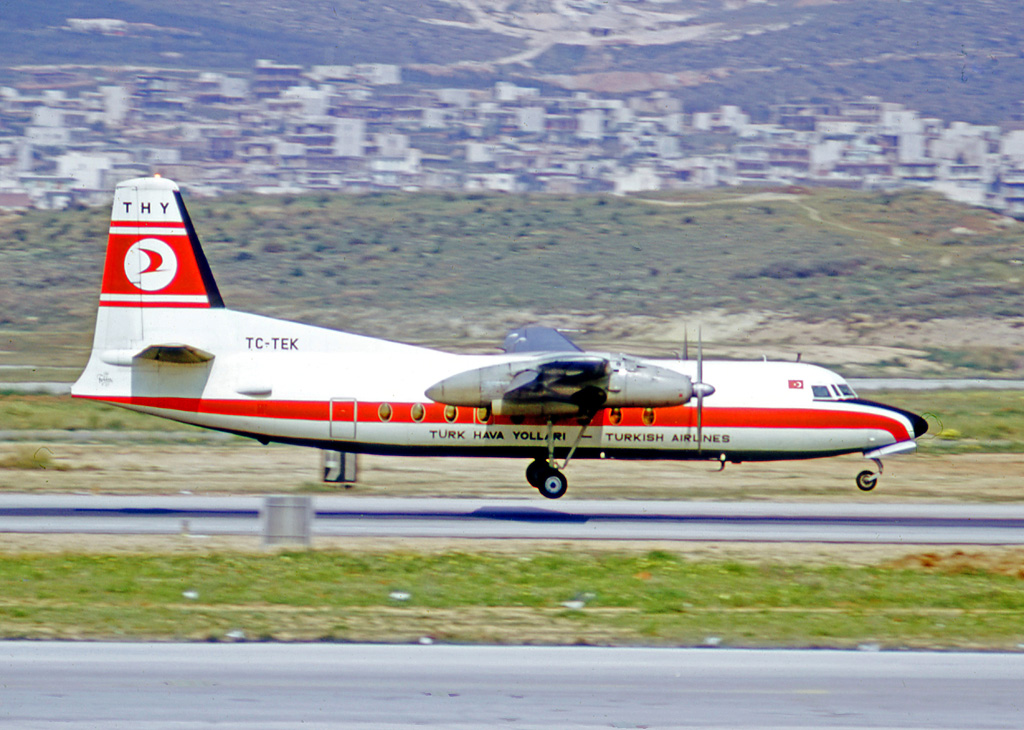
- A Fokker F27-100 of Turkish Airlines, similar to the one involved in the accident

Accident
- Date: 23 September 1961
- Summary: Controlled flight into terrain on final due to pilot error
- Site: Karanlıktepe, Ankara Province, Turkey; 40°N 32.9°E

Aircraft
- Aircraft type: Fokker F27 Friendship 100
- Operator: Turkish Airlines
- IATA flight No.: TK835
- ICAO flight No.: THY835
- Call sign: TURKISH 835
- Registration: TC-TAY
- Flight origin: Adana Şakirpaşa Airport, Turkey
- Destination: Esenboğa International Airport, Ankara, Turkey
- Occupants: 29
- Passengers: 25
- Crew: 4
- Fatalities: 28
- Survivors: 1

Turkish Airlines Flight 835 was a scheduled domestic passenger flight from Adana Şakirpaşa Airport, to Esenboğa International Airport, Ankara, Turkey. On 23 September 1961 at 20:02 EET (18:02 UTC), the aircraft operating the flight, a brand-new Fokker F27 Friendship 100 struck the Karanlıktepe hill in Ankara Province on final approach around 18 kilometres (11 mi) short of the runway.

== Crew and passengers ==
There were 25 passengers and 4 crew on board, of which 24 passengers and all 4 crew members were killed in the accident. Among the Passengers were 10 Members of the Heidelberg Department of Ancient History, including both Professors, Jacques Moreau and Hans Schaefer.

== Cause ==
The probable cause of the accident was that the aircraft was not in the normal flying pattern and was well below its designated altitude.
