= Bozçanak, Palu =

Village in Turkey

Bozçanak
- Village
- Location in Turkey
- Coordinates: 38°34′N 39°50′E
- Country: Turkey
- Province: Elazığ
- District: Palu
- Population (2021): 243
- Time zone: UTC+3 (TRT)

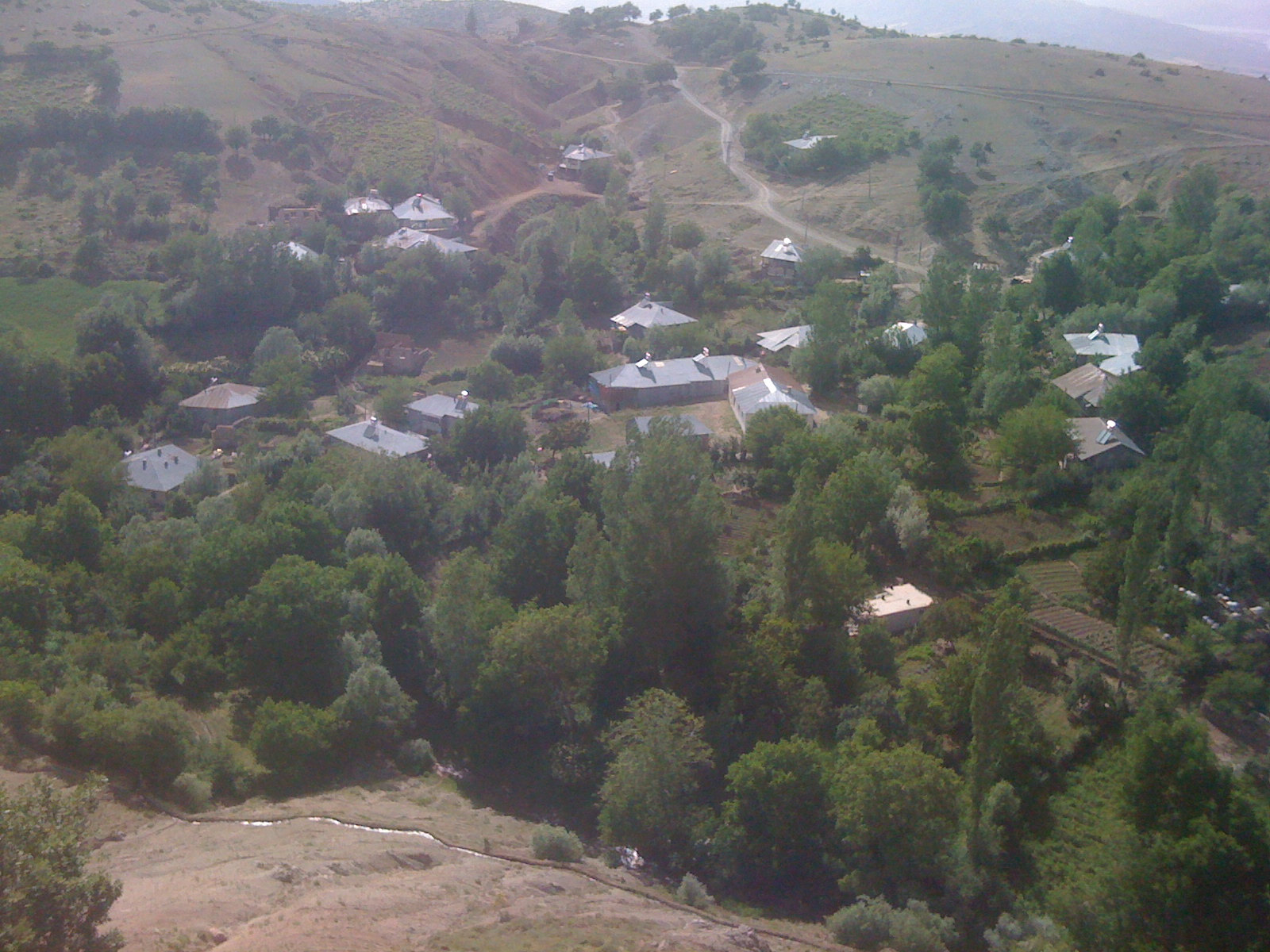
View of Bozçanak village, Turkey.

Bozçanak (Kurdish: Boban) is a village in the Palu District of Elazığ Province in Turkey. Its population is 243 (2021).
