= Baltaşı, Palu =

Village in Turkey

Baltaşı
- Village
- Location in Turkey
- Coordinates: 38.5862°N 39.7815°E
- Country: Turkey
- Province: Elazığ
- District: Palu
- Population (2021): 1,113
- Time zone: UTC+3 (TRT)

Baltaşı (Kurdish: Nacaran) is a village in the Palu District of Elazığ Province in Turkey. Its population is 1,113 (2021). Before the 2013 reorganisation, it was a town (belde).
