= Örencik, Palu =

Village in Turkey

Örencik
- Village
- Location in Turkey
- Coordinates: 38°37′10″N 39°45′47″E
- Country: Turkey
- Province: Elazığ
- District: Palu
- Population (2021): 60
- Time zone: UTC+3 (TRT)

Örencik (Kurdish: Xarabe) is a village in the Palu District of Elazığ Province in Turkey. Its population is 60 (2021).
