= Yeşilbayır, Palu =

Village in Turkey

Yeşilbayır
- Village
- Location in Turkey
- Coordinates: 38.6721°N 39.9373°E
- Country: Turkey
- Province: Elazığ
- District: Palu
- Population (2021): 118
- Time zone: UTC+3 (TRT)

Yeşilbayır (Kurdish: Vank) is a village in the Palu District of Elazığ Province in Turkey. Its population is 118 (2021).
