= İncirlik railway station =

Railway station in Adana, Turkey

İNCİRLİK
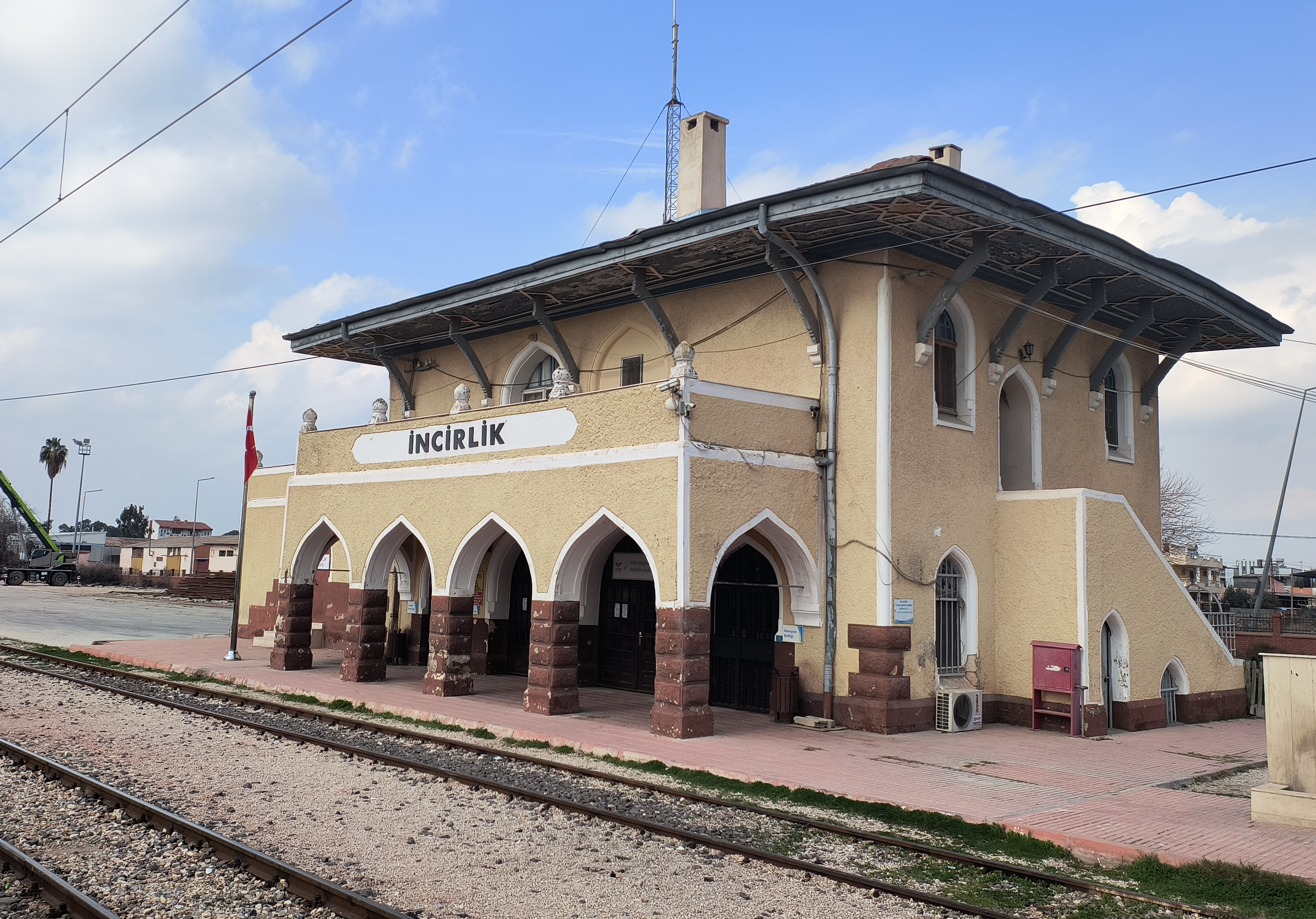
- İncirlik Station

General information
- Location: İncirlik Cumhuriyet mah., İstasyon Cad., Yüreğir, Adana, Turkey
- Coordinates: 36°59′03″N 35°26′08″E
- System: TCDD intercity and regional rail station
- Owner: Turkish State Railways
- Line: Adana-Aleppo railway
- Platforms: 1
- Tracks: 2

Construction
- Structure type: At-grade
- Parking: No

History
- Opened: 1912

Services
Preceding station	TCDD Taşımacılık	Following station
Kiremithane towards Adana	Euphrates Express	Yakapınar towards Elazığ
Kiremithane towards Mersin	Mersin–İslahiye	Yakapınar towards İslahiye
Kiremithane towards Mersin	Mersin–İskenderun	Yakapınar towards İskenderun
Location

İncirlik station is a railway station of Adana, located in the İncirlik quarter of the Yüreğir district. The station is served by two regional and one long-distance line.
