= Beydoğan, Palu =

Village in Turkey

Beydoğan
- Village
- Location in Turkey
- Coordinates: 38°46′N 40°19′E
- Country: Turkey
- Province: Elazığ
- District: Palu
- Population (2021): 14
- Time zone: UTC+3 (TRT)

Beydoğan (Kurdish: Zoxpa) is a village in the Palu District of Elazığ Province in Turkey. Its population is 14 (2021).
