= Burgudere, Palu =

Village in Turkey

Burgudere
- Village
- Location in Turkey
- Coordinates: 38°44′N 40°13′E
- Country: Turkey
- Province: Elazığ
- District: Palu
- Population (2021): 121
- Time zone: UTC+3 (TRT)

Burgudere (Kurdish: Hünekrek) is a village in the Palu District of Elazığ Province in Turkey. Its population is 121 (2021).
