= Hasbey, Palu =

Village in Turkey

Hasbey
- Village
- Location in Turkey
- Coordinates: 38.7065°N 40.1932°E
- Country: Turkey
- Province: Elazığ
- District: Palu
- Population (2021): 52
- Time zone: UTC+3 (TRT)

Hasbey (Kurdish: Xasbeg) is a village in the Palu District of Elazığ Province in Turkey. Its population is 52 (2021).
