= Damlapınar, Palu =

Village in Turkey

Damlapınar
- Village
- Location in Turkey
- Coordinates: 38°41′37″N 40°4′4″E
- Country: Turkey
- Province: Elazığ
- District: Palu
- Population (2021): 92
- Time zone: UTC+3 (TRT)

Damlapınar (Kurdish: Ebasan) is a village in the Palu District of Elazığ Province in Turkey. Its population is 92 (2021).
