= Gemtepe, Palu =

Village in Turkey

Gemtepe
- Village
- Location in Turkey
- Coordinates: 38°48′N 40°18′E
- Country: Turkey
- Province: Elazığ
- District: Palu
- Population (2021): 81
- Time zone: UTC+3 (TRT)

Gemtepe (Kurdish:Xeydîmem) is a village in the Palu District of Elazığ Province in Turkey. Its population is 81 (2021).
