= Gökdere, Palu =

Village in Turkey

Gökdere
- Village
- Location in Turkey
- Coordinates: 38°44′45″N 40°13′3″E
- Country: Turkey
- Province: Elazığ
- District: Palu
- Population (2021): 372
- Time zone: UTC+3 (TRT)

Gökdere (Kurdish: Ardûrek) is a village in the Palu District of Elazığ Province in Turkey. Its population is 372 (2021).
