= Ceyhan railway station =

CEYHAN
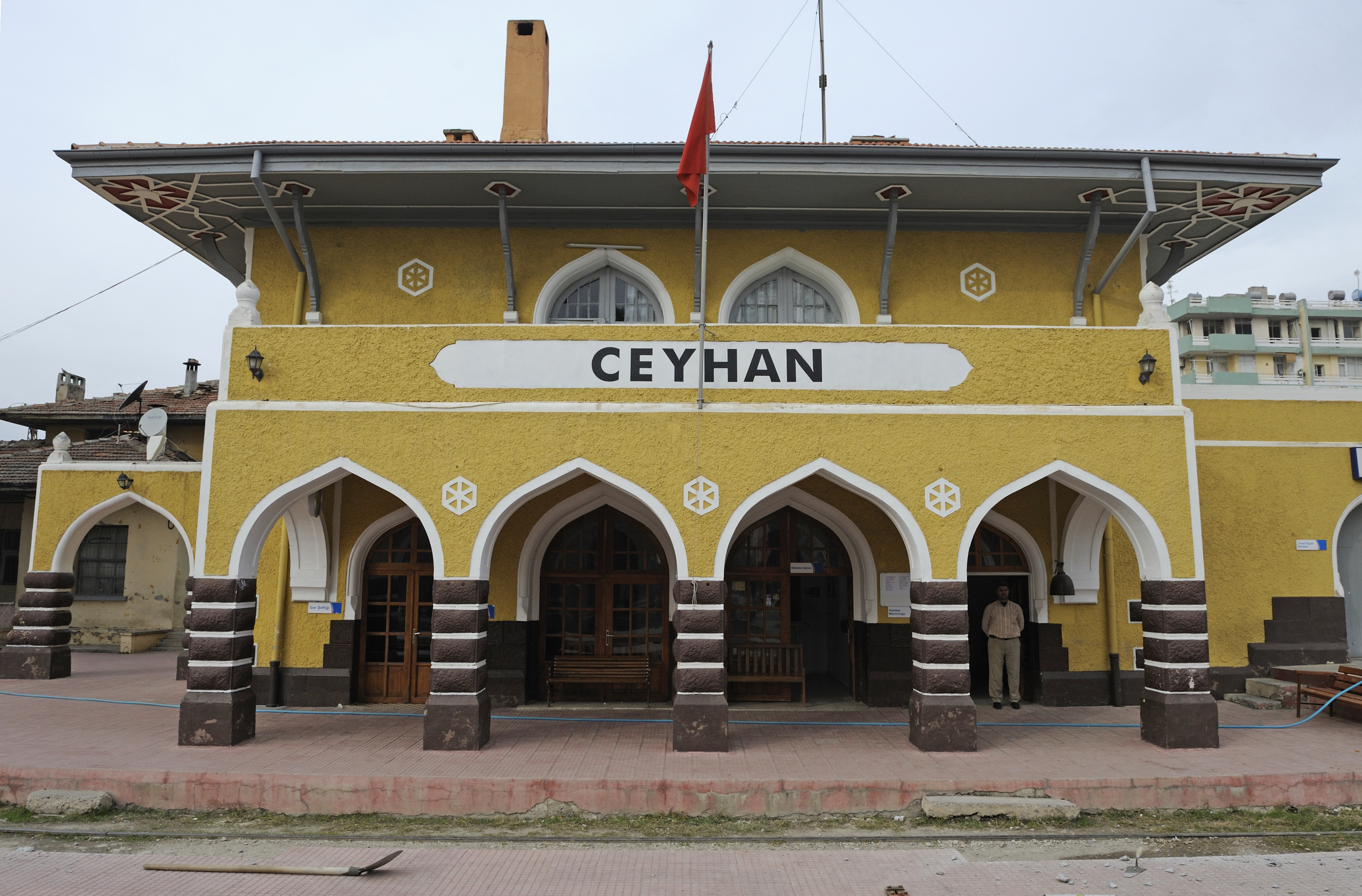
- Ceyhan railway station

General information
- Location: Burhaniye Mh., Adnan Menderes Blv., 01960 Ceyhan/Adana, Turkey
- Coordinates: 37°01′06″N 35°49′01″E
- System: TCDD intercity and regional rail station
- Owner: TCDD
- Line: Adana-Aleppo railway
- Platforms: 2
- Tracks: 4

Construction
- Structure type: At-grade
- Parking: No

History
- Opened: 1912

Services
Preceding station	TCDD Taşımacılık	Following station
Yakapınar towards Adana	Euphrates Express	Günyazı towards Elazığ
Yakapınar towards Mersin	Mersin–İslahiye	Toprakkale towards İslahiye
Yakapınar towards Mersin	Mersin–İskenderun	Toprakkale towards İskenderun
Location

Ceyhan station is the railway station of Ceyhan, that is served by two regional and one long-distance line.
