= Alpaslan-1 Dam =

- Location within Turkey
- Official name: Alpaslan I Barajı
- Location: Toklu, Muş Province, Turkey
- Coordinates: 39.04652°N 41.81761°E
- Construction began: 1994
- Opening date: 2009

Dam and spillways
- Type of dam: Embankment, rock/sand fill with clay core
- Impounds: Murat River
- Height: 91 m (299 ft)
- Dam volume: 3,780,000 m^{3} (4,940,000 cu yd)

Reservoir
- Total capacity: 2,993,000,000 m^{3} (0.718 mi^{3})
- Catchment area: 15,460 km^{2} (5,970 mi^{2})
- Surface area: 115 km^{2} (44 mi^{2})

Power Station
- Commission date: 2009
- Turbines: 4 x 40 MW Francis-type
- Installed capacity: 160 MW
- Annual generation: 488 GWh
- Website www.alpaslan-1 barajı

Alpaslan-1 Dam (Turkish: Alpaslan I Barajı) is a dam and hydroelectric power station in Muş Province, Turkey. The foundation stone was laid in 1994, and construction on the dam's superstructure commenced in 1998. The dam began impounding its reservoir in 2008, and the first of four 40 MW generators became operational in 2009. The second was commissioned in 2012.

== See also ==
- Alpaslan-2 Dam – sister dam downstream, completed in 2021
- List of dams and reservoirs in Turkey
