= Güllüce, Palu =

Village in Turkey

Güllüce
- Village
- Location in Turkey
- Coordinates: 38.697°N 40.138°E
- Country: Turkey
- Province: Elazığ
- District: Palu
- Population (2021): 243
- Time zone: UTC+3 (TRT)

Güllüce (Kurdish: Seraçor) is a village in the Palu District of Elazığ Province in Turkey. Its population is 243 (2021). The village is populated by Kurds of the Bekiran tribe.
