= Karataş, Palu =

Village in Turkey

Karataş
- Village
- Location in Turkey
- Coordinates: 38.6180°N 39.9063°E
- Country: Turkey
- Province: Elazığ
- District: Palu
- Population (2021): 140
- Time zone: UTC+3 (TRT)

Karataş (Kurdish: Kadıyan) is a village in the Palu District of Elazığ Province in Turkey. Its population is 140 (2021).
