= Kasıl, Palu =

Village in Turkey

Kasıl
- Village
- Location in Turkey
- Coordinates: 38°38′N 39°59′E
- Country: Turkey
- Province: Elazığ
- District: Palu
- Population (2021): 132
- Time zone: UTC+3 (TRT)

Kasıl (Kurdish:Kasîl) is a village in the Palu District of Elazığ Province in Turkey. Its population is 132 (2021).
