= Gümeçbağlar, Palu =

Village in Turkey

Gümeçbağlar
- Village
- Location within Turkey
- Coordinates: 38°37′54″N 39°51′44″E
- Country: Turkey
- Province: Elazığ
- District: Palu
- Elevation: 1,064 m (3,491 ft)
- Population (2021): 155
- Time zone: UTC+3 (TRT)
- Postal code: 23502
- Area code: 0424

Gümeçbağlar (Kurdish: Tîlek) is a village in the Palu District of Elazığ Province in Turkey.

== Geography ==
The village is 86 km from Elazig city center and 14 km from Palu town centre. Its elevation is 1,064 m.

== Population ==
Historical population
Year	Pop.	±% p.a.
1985	179	—
1990	194	+1.62%
1997	257	+4.10%
2007	191	−2.92%
2012	167	−2.65%
2017	172	+0.59%
2021	155	−2.57%
Source: Population censuses (1985-1997) and TÜIK (2007-2021)
