= Turkish Airlines Flight 5904 =

1999 aviation accident

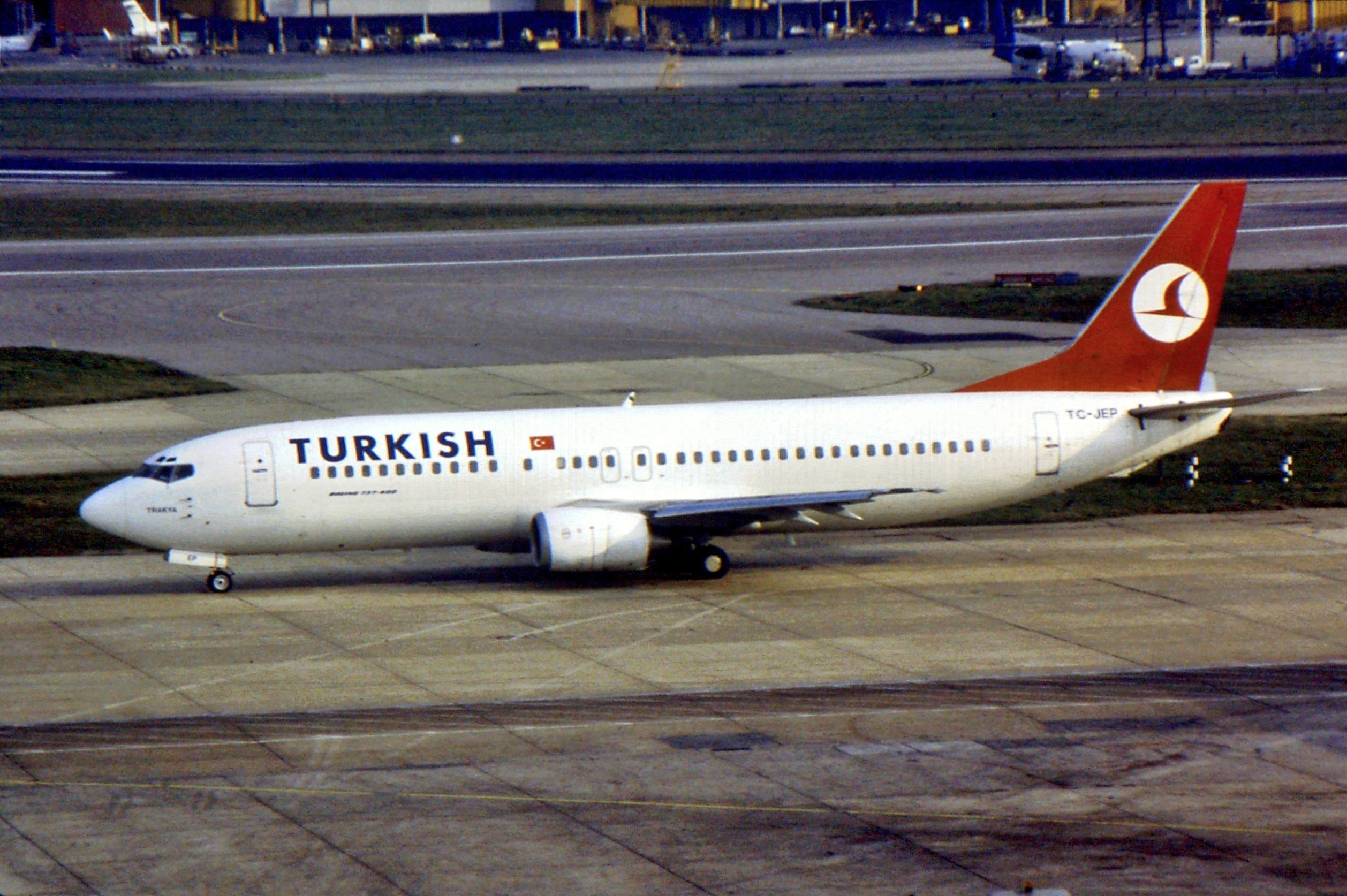
- TC-JEP, the aircraft involved, seen at London Heathrow Airport in 1997

Accident
- Date: 7 April 1999
- Summary: Crashed shortly after takeoff due to instrument malfunction
- Site: Near Ceyhan, Adana Province, Turkey; 37°12′N 35°21′E

Aircraft
- Aircraft type: Boeing 737-4Q8
- Aircraft name: Trakya
- Operator: Turkish Airlines
- IATA flight No.: TK5904
- ICAO flight No.: THY5904
- Call sign: TURKISH 5904
- Registration: TC-JEP
- Flight origin: Adana Şakirpaşa Airport, Adana, Turkey
- Destination: King Abdulaziz International Airport, Jeddah, Saudi Arabia
- Occupants: 6
- Passengers: 0
- Crew: 6
- Fatalities: 6
- Survivors: 0

Turkish Airlines Flight 5904 was a Boeing 737-400 on an international repositioning flight from Adana Şakirpaşa Airport in Adana, Turkey, to King Abdulaziz International Airport in Jeddah, Saudi Arabia, which crashed on 7 April 1999 in the vicinity of Ceyhan, Adana Province, in southern Turkey, eight minutes after takeoff. There were no passengers on board the aircraft, which was on its way to Saudi Arabia to pick up pilgrims from Jeddah. All six crew members were killed in the accident.

== Flight ==
The aircraft was a Boeing 737-400, built in 1995, registered as TC-JEP, and named Trakya, which is Thrace in Turkish. Owned by ILFC, an American aircraft lessor, it was equipped with two CFM International CFM56 engines and had accumulated around 11,600 flight hours in 6,360 flight cycles up until the time of the accident.

The preceding flight from King Abdulaziz International Airport in Jeddah, Saudi Arabia, had uneventfully transferred 150 pilgrims returning from the hajj to Adana Şakirpaşa Airport, where it landed at around 23:45 EET (20:45 UTC). Remaining on the ground for around one hour for refueling, Flight 5904 took off with a new crew – two pilots and four flight attendants – and around 10 to 15 tons of fuel at 00:36 EET to pick up more pilgrims from Jeddah.

Before takeoff, upon request by the crew, the air traffic controller at Incirlik Air Base relayed the weather report, informing the crew that the entire aerodrome was completely covered by thunderstorms and that the thunderstorms were moving from the south towards the north.

=== Accident ===
At 00:44 EET, at an altitude of around 10,000 feet (3.0 km), the aircraft started to descend and crashed into a field some 30 nautical miles (56 km) east-northeast of the airport near Hamdilli village, in the vicinity of Ceyhan, Adana Province. The force of the impact created a 15 metres (49 ft) deep and 30 square metres (320 sq ft) large hole. The horizontal stabilizer of the aircraft was discovered some 250 metres (820 ft) away from the main wreckage, which was spread over an area of around 500 square metres (5,400 sq ft). All six occupants were instantly killed.

The impact resulted in a large explosion that was reported near Hamdili. After the aircraft vanished from radar, air traffic controllers at Adana Airport and Incirlik Air Base immediately notified the Gendarmerie and the police to initiate search and rescue efforts.

== Investigation ==
The investigation into the accident was carried out by Turkey's Directorate General of Civil Aviation (DGCA). The cockpit voice recorder revealed that while the crew was struggling to regain control of the aircraft, at least some of the four flight attendants were inside the cockpit panicking and screaming. The copilot was heard telling the captain "aman ağabey, gittik, gidiyoruz, bas.." (which roughly translates into "Oh brother, we've gone, we're going, push...").

=== Final report ===
The final report concluded that:

1. Severe thunderstorms probably contributed to the accident.
2. The pitot static anti-ice system was probably not activated during preparations for flight.
3. The crew failed to recognize the cause of erratic airspeed indication.
4. The crew failed to use other cockpit indications for control and recovery of the airplane.
5. The presence of cabin crew in the cockpit probably distracted the cockpit crew.
