= Kayahisar, Palu =

Village in Turkey

Kayahisar
- Village
- Location in Turkey
- Coordinates: 38°33′39″N 40°2′15″E
- Country: Turkey
- Province: Elazığ
- District: Palu
- Population (2021): 118
- Time zone: UTC+3 (TRT)

Kayahisar (Kurdish: Ropîn) is a village in the Palu District of Elazığ Province in Turkey. Its population is 118 (2021). The village is populated by Kurds.
