= Gümüşkaynak, Palu =

Village in Turkey

Gümüşkaynak
- Village
- Location in Turkey
- Coordinates: 38°36′N 39°44′E
- Country: Turkey
- Province: Elazığ
- District: Palu
- Population (2021): 32
- Time zone: UTC+3 (TRT)

Gümüşkaynak (Kurdish:Kurdikan) is a village in the Palu District of Elazığ Province in Turkey. Its population is 32 (2021).
