= Altınölçek, Palu =

Village in Turkey

Altınölçek
- Village
- Location in Turkey
- Coordinates: 38°40′N 40°05′E
- Country: Turkey
- Province: Elazığ
- District: Palu
- Population (2021): 101
- Time zone: UTC+3 (TRT)

Altınölçek (Kurdish: Şêxmîran) is a village in the Palu District of Elazığ Province in Turkey. Its population is 101 (2021).
