= Seydili, Palu =

Village in Turkey

Seydili
- Village
- Location in Turkey
- Coordinates: 38°41′35″N 39°53′11″E
- Country: Turkey
- Province: Elazığ
- District: Palu
- Population (2021): 279
- Time zone: UTC+3 (TRT)

Seydili is a village in the Palu District of Elazığ Province in Turkey. Its population is 279 (2021).
