= Akbulut, Palu =

Village in Turkey

Akbulut
- Village
- Location in Turkey
- Coordinates: 38.7518°N 40.2846°E
- Country: Turkey
- Province: Elazığ
- District: Palu
- Population (2021): 39
- Time zone: UTC+3 (TRT)

Akbulut (Kurdish:Zîver) is a village in the Palu District of Elazığ Province in Turkey. Its population is 39 (2021).
