= Yolçatı =

Yolçatı can refer to:

- Yolçatı, Acıpayam
- Yolçatı, Adilcevaz, a village
- Yolçatı, Bolu, a village in Bolu District, Turkey
- Yolçatı, Elâzığ
- Yolçatı, Silivri, a village in Silivri District, Turkey
