= Selman Akbulut =

Turkish mathematician (born 1949)

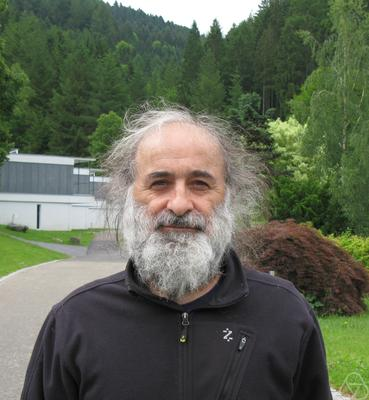
- Selman Akbulut at Oberwolfach in 2012.
- Born: 1949 (age 76–77); Balıkesir, Turkey
- Education: University of California
- Occupation: Mathematician
- Known for: Akbulut cork

Selman Akbulut (born 1949) is a Turkish mathematician, specializing in research in topology, and geometry. He was a professor at Michigan State University until February 2020.

== Career ==
In 1975, he earned his Ph.D. from the University of California, Berkeley as a student of Robion Kirby. In topology, he has worked on handlebody theory, low-dimensional manifolds, symplectic topology, G2 manifolds. In the topology of real-algebraic sets, he and Henry C. King proved that every compact piecewise-linear manifold is a real-algebraic set; they discovered new topological invariants of real-algebraic sets.

He was a visiting scholar several times at the Institute for Advanced Study (in 1975-76, 1980–81, 2002, and 2005).

On February 14, 2020, Akbulut was removed from his tenured position at MSU by the Board of Trustees, after disputes over his teaching allotments and communications with colleagues.

== Contributions ==
He has developed 4-dimensional handlebody techniques, settling conjectures and solving problems about 4-manifolds, such as a conjecture of Christopher Zeeman, the Harer–Kas–Kirby conjecture, a problem of Martin Scharlemann, and problems of Sylvain Cappell and Julius Shaneson. He constructed an exotic compact 4-manifold (with boundary) from which he discovered "Akbulut corks".

His most recent results concern the 4-dimensional smooth Poincaré conjecture. He has supervised 14 Ph.D. students as of 2019. He has more than 100 papers and three books published, and several books edited.
