= Arındık, Palu =

Village in Turkey

Arındık
- Village
- Location in Turkey
- Coordinates: 38.7240°N 40.1752°E
- Country: Turkey
- Province: Elazığ
- District: Palu
- Population (2021): 200
- Time zone: UTC+3 (TRT)

Arındık (Kurdish: Lekîc) is a village in the Palu District of Elazığ Province in Turkey. Its population is 200 (2021).
