= Keklikdere, Palu =

Village in Turkey

Keklikdere
- Village
- Location in Turkey
- Coordinates: 38°36′51″N 39°49′48″E
- Country: Turkey
- Province: Elazığ
- District: Palu
- Population (2021): 443
- Time zone: UTC+3 (TRT)

Keklikdere (Kurdish: Dirxe) is a village in the Palu District of Elazığ Province in Turkey. Its population is 443 (2021).
