= Akbulut cork =

Structure in topology

In topology, an Akbulut cork is a structure that is frequently used to show that in 4 dimensions, the smooth h-cobordism theorem fails. It is named after Turkish mathematician Selman Akbulut.

A compact contractible Stein 4-manifold $C$ with involution $F$ on its boundary is called an Akbulut cork, if $F$ extends to a self-homeomorphism but cannot extend to a self-diffeomorphism inside (hence a cork is an exotic copy of itself relative to its boundary). A cork $(C,F)$ is called a cork of a smooth 4-manifold $X$, if removing $C$ from $X$ and re-gluing it via $F$ changes the smooth structure of $X$ (this operation is called "cork twisting"). Any exotic copy $X'$ of a closed simply connected 4-manifold $X$ differs from $X$ by a single cork twist.

The basic idea of the Akbulut cork is that when attempting to use the h-cobordism theorem in four dimensions, the cork is the sub-cobordism that contains all the exotic properties of the spaces connected with the cobordism, and when removed the two spaces become trivially h-cobordant and smooth. This shows that in four dimensions, although the theorem does not tell us that two manifolds are diffeomorphic (only homeomorphic), they are "not far" from being diffeomorphic.

To illustrate this (without proof), consider a smooth h-cobordism $W^5$ between two 4-manifolds $M$ and $N$. Then within $W$ there is a sub-cobordism $K^5$ between $A^4 \subset M$ and $B^4 \subset N$ and there is a diffeomorphism

$$W \setminus \operatorname{int}\, K \cong \left(M \setminus \operatorname{int}\, A \right) \times \left[0,1\right],$$

which is the content of the h-cobordism theorem for n ≥ 5 (here int X refers to the interior of a manifold X). In addition, A and B are diffeomorphic with a diffeomorphism that is an involution on the boundary ∂A = ∂B. Therefore, it can be seen that the h-corbordism K connects A with its "inverted" image B. This submanifold A is the Akbulut cork.
