= Beyhan =

- Municipality
- Location in Turkey
- Coordinates: 38°43′39″N 40°07′46″E
- Country: Turkey
- Province: Elazığ
- District: Palu
- Population (2021): 1,940
- Time zone: UTC+3 (TRT)

Beyhan (also: Beyhanı) is a town (belde) in Palu District, Elazığ Province, Turkey. Its population is 1,940 (2021). The Beyhan I Dam is situated near the town.
