= Beyhan Çalışkan =

Turkish football manager

Personal information
- Date of birth: 6 April 1960 (age 66)
- Place of birth: Ruse, Bulgaria
- Position: Midfielder

Senior career*
| Years | Team | Apps | (Gls) |
| 1984–1990 | Bursaspor | | |
| 1991 | Adana Demirspor | | |
| 1991–1993 | Kayserispor | | |
| 1993–1994 | Sarıyer | | |
| 1994–1995 | Mustafakemalpaşa Spor | | |

International career
| 1985 | Turkey | 1 | (0) |

Managerial career
- 2000: Bursaspor (academy)
- 2001–2001: Bursa Merinosspor (assistant)
- 2003: Mustafakemalpaşa Spor
- 2003–2004: Kestel Belediyespor
- 2004: Bilecikspor
- 2006–2007: Orhangazispor
- 2011–2012: Fethiyespor
- 2012: Altay
- 2013–2014: Sarıyer
- 2014–2015: Fethiyespor
- 2016: Fethiyespor
- 2016: Denizli BS
- 2017–2018: Yeşil Bursa
- * Club domestic league appearances and goals

Beyhan Çalışkan (born 6 April 1960) is a Turkish football manager and former player. He played as a midfielder.
