= Kırkbulak, Palu =

Village in Turkey

Kırkbulak
- Village
- Location in Turkey
- Coordinates: 38°48′2″N 40°14′12″E
- Country: Turkey
- Province: Elazığ
- District: Palu
- Population (2021): 155
- Time zone: UTC+3 (TRT)

Kırkbulak (Kurdish:Parsiyana Mezin) is a village in the Palu District of Elazığ Province in Turkey. Its population is 155 (2021).
