= Palu, Elazığ =

Palu
- Municipality
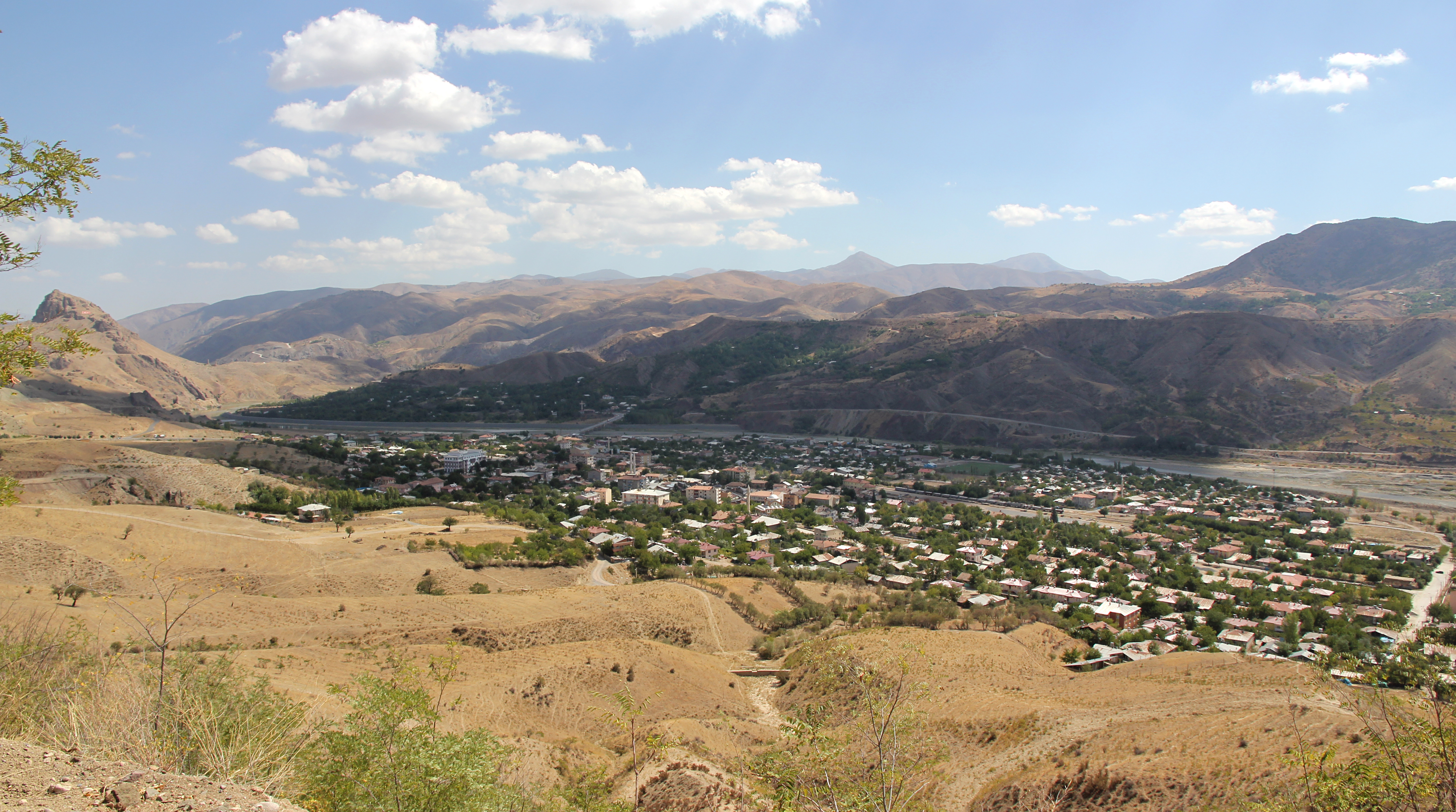

- Location within Turkey
- Coordinates: 38°42′14″N 39°57′04″E
- Country: Turkey
- Province: Elazığ
- District: Palu

Government
  - Mayor: Muhammet Septioğlu (YRP)
- Population (2021): 9,602
- Time zone: UTC+3 (TRT)
- Postal code: 23500
- Climate: Csa
- Website: www.palu.bel.tr

Palu (Armenian: Բալու; Zazaki: Palî; Kurdish: Palo) is a town of Elazığ Province of Turkey. It is the seat of Palu District. The current mayor is Muhammet Septioğlu (YRP). Its population is 9,602 (2021). Inhabited since ancient times, Palu was the capital of the classical Armenian region of Balabitene and then, much later, of the Kurdish Emirate of Palu. In the early 20th century, Palu was relocated from its old location to the current site.

== Names ==
Its Greek name was Romanopolis (Ρωμανούπολις). The name "Shebeteria", found in the Urartian inscription at the Palu citadel, may be Palu's ancient name. The Urartian city called "Palua" has also been identified with Palu. König and Burney also identified Palu with the "Uashtal" mentioned in Urartian sources, but according to R.D. Barnett this is unlikely. James Howard-Johnston identifies Palu with the "Palios" mentioned by the 7th-century geographer George of Cyprus.

== Geography ==
Palu is located on the north side of the Murat Su, at the lower end of a treeless plain bisected by a low line of hills. The Palu plain has fertile soil and is today covered in farmland. To the northeast is the stony Karakoçan plain.

=== Climate ===
Palu has a hot-summer Mediterranean climate (Köppen: Csa), with very hot, dry summers, and cold winters.

Climate data for Palu (1991–2020)
Month	Jan	Feb	Mar	Apr	May	Jun	Jul	Aug	Sep	Oct	Nov	Dec	Year
Mean daily maximum °C (°F)	4.8 (40.6)	6.9 (44.4)	13.4 (56.1)	19.6 (67.3)	25.4 (77.7)	32.1 (89.8)	36.7 (98.1)	36.9 (98.4)	31.6 (88.9)	23.7 (74.7)	13.9 (57.0)	6.8 (44.2)	21.0 (69.8)
Daily mean °C (°F)	0.4 (32.7)	1.9 (35.4)	7.5 (45.5)	13.0 (55.4)	17.9 (64.2)	23.6 (74.5)	27.8 (82.0)	27.7 (81.9)	22.5 (72.5)	15.9 (60.6)	7.7 (45.9)	2.5 (36.5)	14.1 (57.4)
Mean daily minimum °C (°F)	−3.1 (26.4)	−2.3 (27.9)	2.3 (36.1)	7.0 (44.6)	10.9 (51.6)	14.9 (58.8)	18.8 (65.8)	18.7 (65.7)	14.1 (57.4)	9.4 (48.9)	2.9 (37.2)	−0.8 (30.6)	7.8 (46.0)
Average precipitation mm (inches)	62.74 (2.47)	59.7 (2.35)	74.18 (2.92)	77.54 (3.05)	56.92 (2.24)	13.89 (0.55)	2.52 (0.10)	2.79 (0.11)	8.3 (0.33)	51.84 (2.04)	51.92 (2.04)	56.85 (2.24)	519.19 (20.44)
Average precipitation days (≥ 1.0 mm)	7.3	7.9	8.8	8.9	7.4	2.7	1.5	2.1	2.1	5.7	6.3	7.9	68.6
Average relative humidity (%)	68.3	64.0	56.6	54.1	50.6	36.8	30.5	30.8	36.3	52.0	66.0	71.8	51.5
Mean monthly sunshine hours	96.1	120.7	163.3	207.1	265.2	308.7	336.0	342.2	291.3	218.9	145.3	81.1	2,568.9
Source: NOAA

== History ==
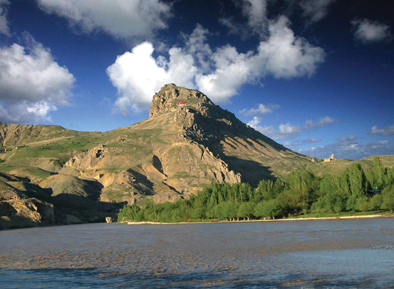
Palu's old citadel

The story of Palu begins at the old site now called Eski Palu, just east of the modern town. This site was inhabited continuously for over 2,500 years, from ancient Urartian times until the early 20th century, when the town was relocated to the modern site. Palu's old town was built on a promontory above a U-shaped bend in the Murat Su. Looming above the town center to the north was the imposing castle rock. From this height, defenders would have had a commanding view of the entire Palu plain - from the town below, the low hills running through the middle of the plain would block your vision, but from the castle rock you could see over them to the far side of the plain.

Since Urartian times, if not earlier, the castle rock at Eski Palu has been the site of a fortress. Most traces of the Urartian fortress have been wiped out by later occupation. One important remnant is an inscribed stele describing the Urartian king Menua's conquest of a region called Shebeteria - possibly an ancient name for Palu. Menua established a temple to Ḫaldi at Shebeteria afterwards.

Ancient Palu's population was likely culturally Urartian instead of just Urartian-ruled; there may have also been an Aramaic-speaking minority. Three rock-cut tombs on the northwest side of the citadel suggest the presence of a rich upper class here. There were important iron ore deposits in the Palu region, which together with copper deposits near Ergani may have been a strategic objective in the conflict between Urartu and Assyria.

In classical times, Palu was the capital of the Armenian district of Balabitene, or Balahovit. This consisted of the Palu plain and was a rich and fertile, if small, district. The neighboring district of Paghnatun, based at Bağın, was probably politically subordinate to Balahovit.

During the middle ages, Palu was a flourishing market town with a mixed Armenian and Syriac population. It was far enough from major conflict zones that agriculture and animal husbandry were able to continue unimpeded. Under Arab rule, Palu held strategic importance because it controlled a route to Erzurum. Later, Palu formed part of the Artukid emirate of Harput; along with Kiğı, it was one of the main towns in the eastern part of the emirate.

Palu was the site of an Akkoyunlu fortress in the late 15th century, which was captured by Hüseyin Bey, a Mirdâsîd lord from the Principality of Eğil. He established the Emirate of Palu, which existed from 1495 to 1845. The town had a significant Armenian population until the Armenian genocide in 1915.

The citadel at Palu was abandoned sometime in the 17th century, although the town continued. The old site of Eski Palu was eventually abandoned either during the First World War or shortly thereafter, and the town was relocated to its present site.

The city was briefly captured on 21 February 1925 by the forces of Sheikh Said during his rebellion.

== Demographics ==
At the beginning of the 19th century, the kaza had 100,000 inhabitants: 60–70% Armenians, the rest Kurds and Turks. According to the Armenian Patriarchate of Constantinople, 15,753 Armenians lived in the kaza on the eve of the First World War, with 38 churches, two monasteries and 26 schools. The town of Balu had a mixed population of Armenians, Turks, Kurds, Syriacs, and Greeks with about 6,000 inhabitants in 1830-1850 and 10,000 in 1914. Half of the population was Armenian.

Mother tongue, Palu District, 1927 Turkish census
Turkish	Arabic	Kurdish	Circassian	Armenian	Unknown or other language
8,816	2	26,008	6	174	–

Religion, Palu District, 1927 Turkish census
Muslim	Christian	Jewish	Unknown or other religion
34,822	184	–	–

== Monuments ==
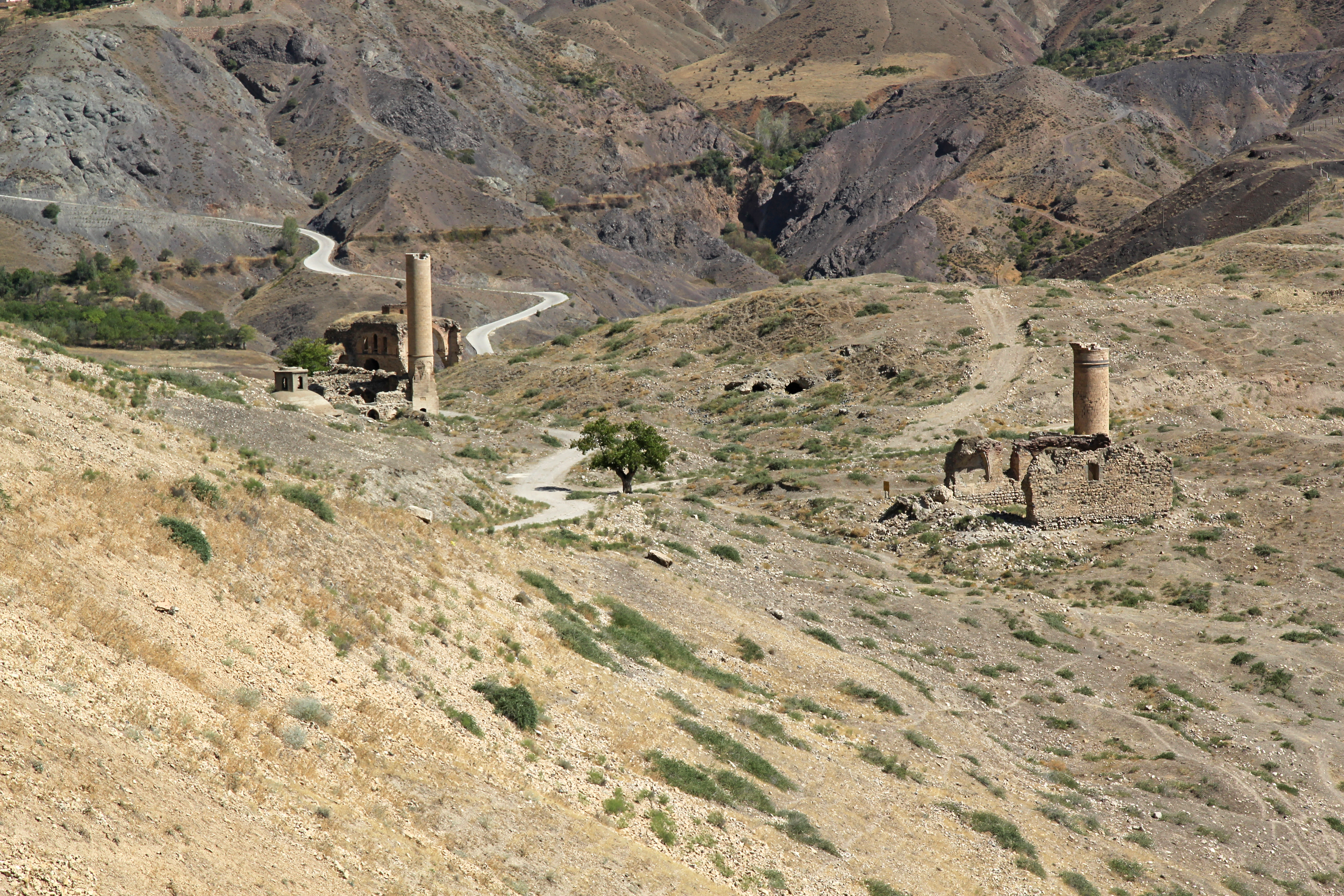
Remains at Eski Palu

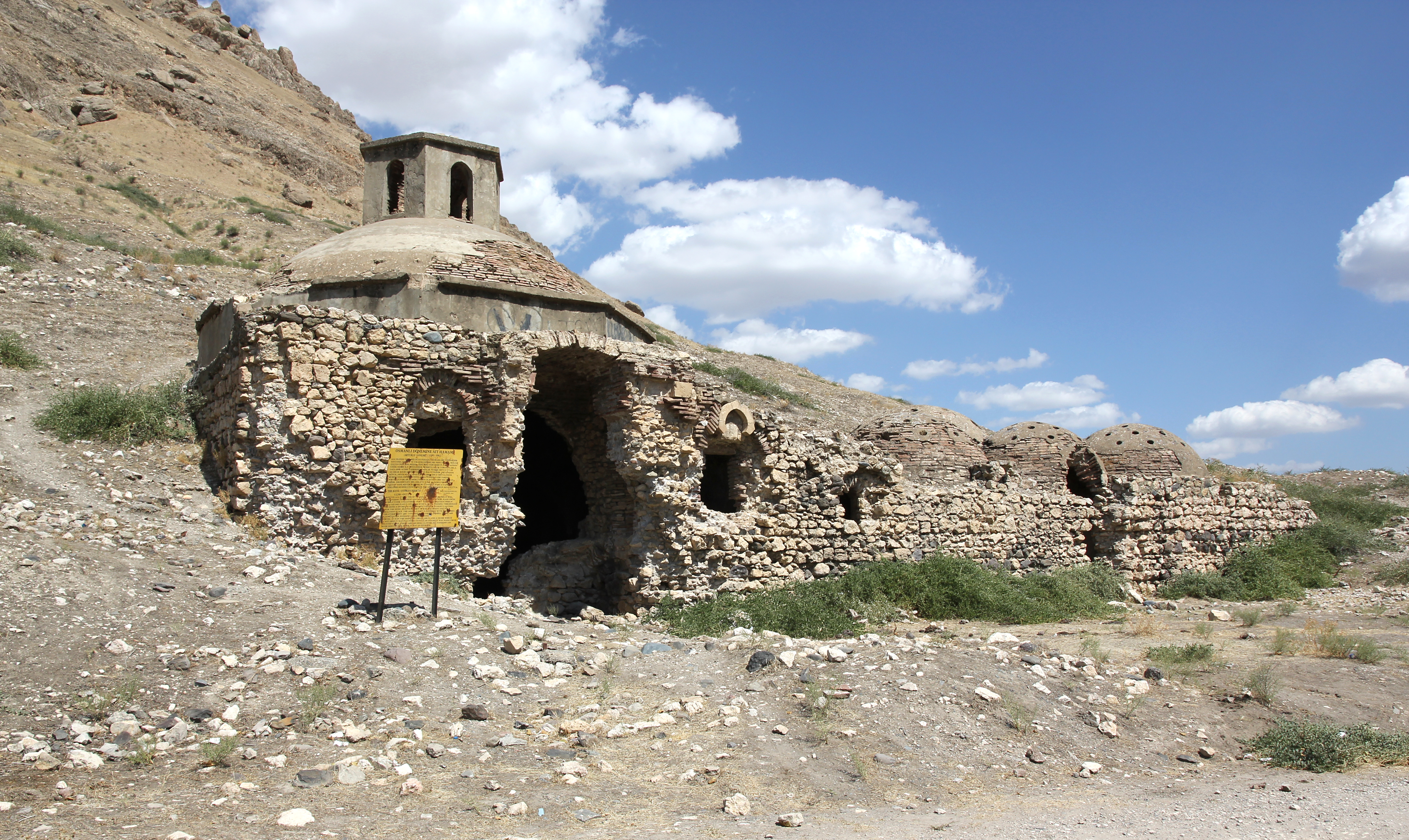
Remains of the hammam at Eski Palu

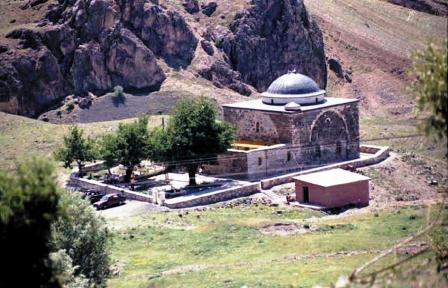
The Cemşid Bey mosque

The fortress built on top of the castle rock consists of four walled enclosures, each one enclosing a distinct part of the mountain. The outer enclosure occupies the relatively gentle western slope of the castle rock. Above it is the main enclosure. Inside it, at the very highest point of the citadel, is the top enclosure. A fourth enclosure fortifies long rocky outcropping that juts out from the castle rock's west side.

The surviving masonry walls and towers all seem to date from the late middle ages. The Urartian inscription of Menua is located on the north side of the outer enclosure, just below a cliff that goes all the way up to the top enclosure. Nearby are a series of rock-cut chambers which, according to local tradition, were the place where Mesrop Mashtots invented the Armenian alphabet. A large Christian church is located on the east side of the main enclosure; it was built in the early 1800s.

The Ulu Cami, or congregational mosque, is a simple structure with a long, low profile. The current structure is from the 15th or 16th century, replacing an earlier mosque built under the Artukids. There have since been significant changes to the Ulu Cami since then: for example, its minaret was built in 1660/61, and an outer courtyard was added in the early 20th century. The mihrab is dated to 1750/51, and the original wooden minbar still exists, although the wooden gallery has decayed and partly broken down. The aptly-named Küçük Cami, or "small mosque", is a 10x10 m square with thick walls. Its dome has since collapsed.

The large hammam, or bathhouse, dates from 1659/60 and is well-preserved. From west to east, it had a large changing room, a cold room, and then a hot room. The mosque and türbe of Cemşid Bey, said to have been a cavalry officer under Selim I, is located further north and is still in use as a village mosque. The mosque appears to have been built before the türbe, so Cemşid's role in their construction is unclear. Two other old mosques exist in this northern area: the Alacalı Mescit, which was built in either the 16th or early 17th century, and the Merkez Cami, or "central mosque", which was built in 1874.

== Notable people ==
- Katherine Magarian
- Selahattin Demirtaş
- Nurettin Demirtaş
- Sheikh Said
