= Büyükçaltı, Palu =

Village in Turkey

Büyükçaltı
- Village
- Location in Turkey
- Coordinates: 38.7928°N 40.2733°E
- Country: Turkey
- Province: Elazığ
- District: Palu
- Population (2021): 144
- Time zone: UTC+3 (TRT)

Büyükçaltı (Kurdish: Xêylana Mezin, or Xelon) is a village in the Palu District of Elazığ Province in Turkey. Its population is 144 (2021).
