= Upper Kaleköy Dam =

- Location within Turkey
- Official name: Yukarı Kaleköy Baraji ve HEPP
- Country: Turkey
- Location: Kale, Solhan, Bingöl Province
- Coordinates: 38°48′40.42″N 41°2′34.44″E
- Purpose: Power
- Status: Operational
- Construction began: 2012
- Opening date: February 2018
- Owner: Kalehan Energy Generation

Dam and spillways
- Type of dam: Gravity, roller-compacted concrete
- Impounds: Murat River
- Height (foundation): 150 m (490 ft)
- Height (thalweg): 137.5 m (451 ft)
- Length: 516.42 m (1,694.3 ft)
- Dam volume: 2,474,000 m^{3} (3,236,000 cu yd)
- Spillway capacity: 8,777 m^{3}/s (310,000 cu ft/s)

Reservoir
- Total capacity: 783,800,000 m^{3} (635,400 acre⋅ft)

Power Station
- Commission date: April 2018
- Type: Conventional
- Hydraulic head: 132.5 m (435 ft) (gross)
- Turbines: 3 x 202 MW, 1 x 30.6 MW Francis-type
- Installed capacity: 636.6 MW
- Annual generation: 1,505 GWh (est.)

The Upper Kaleköy Dam, also known as the Yukarı Kaleköy Dam, is a gravity dam on the Murat River near the town of Kale in Solhan district of Bingöl Province, eastern Turkey. Construction on the dam began in 2012 and was completed in 2018. It is one of six major dams planned for the river. Its primary purpose is hydroelectric power generation and it supports a 636.6 MW hydroelectric power station. The 150 m (490 ft) tall dam withholds a reservoir of 783,800,000 m^{3} (635,400 acre⋅ft). It is owned by Kalehan Energy Generation.

== See also ==
- Alpaslan-2 Dam – upstream, completed in 2021
- Beyhan I Dam – downstream
