= Murat River =

River in eastern Turkey

Murat River Eastern Euphrates
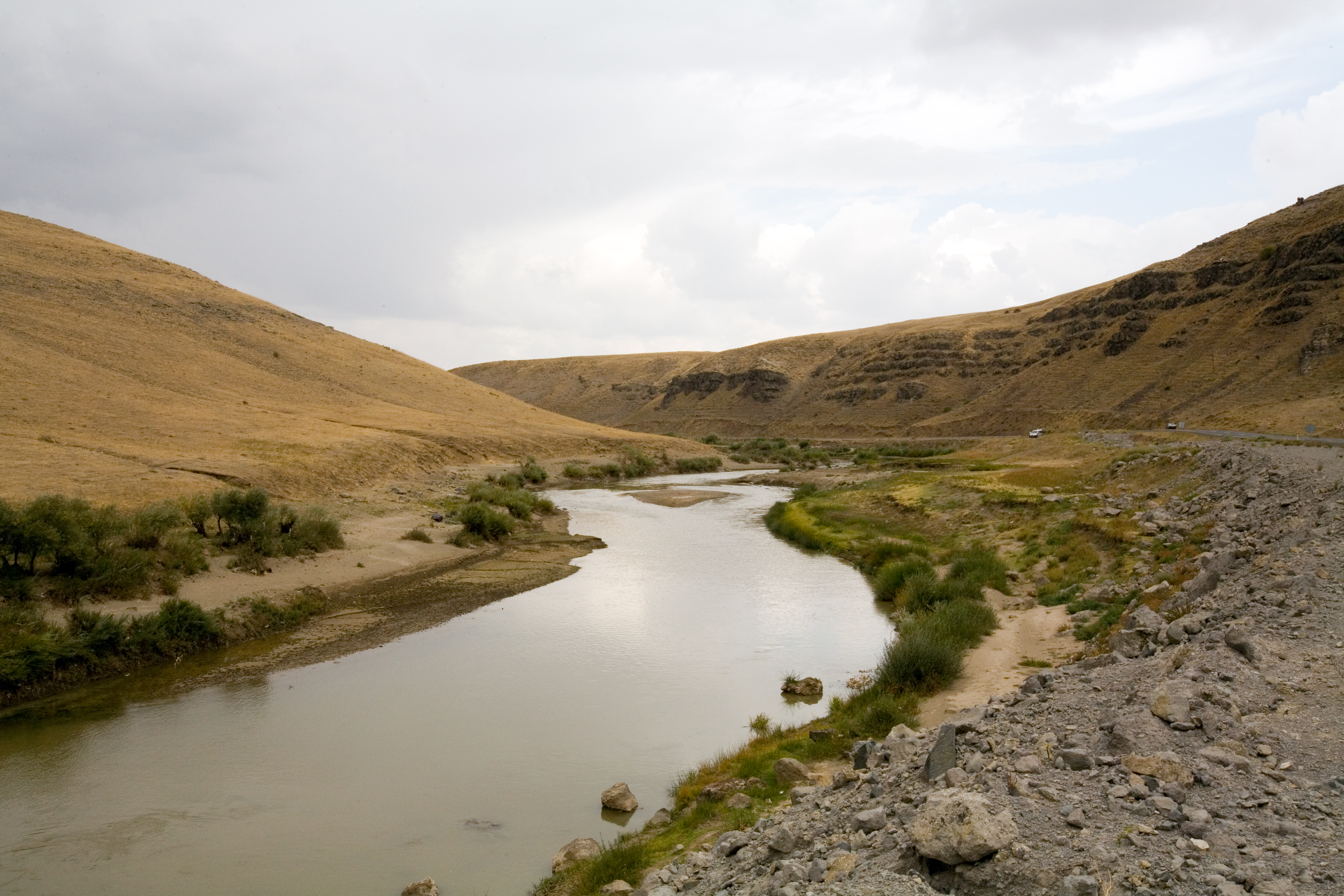
- Murat River

Location
- Country: Turkey
- Geographical region: Armenian highlands
- Political region: Eastern Anatolia region

Physical characteristics
- Source
  - location: near Diyadin north of Lake Van
  - coordinates: 39°16′37″N 43°33′16″E
  - elevation: 2,720 m (8,920 ft)
- Mouth
  - location: Karasu near Keban, Elazığ Province
  - elevation: 820 m (2,690 ft)
- Length: 722 km (449 mi)

Basin features
- River system: Euphrates

Location of Murat River's source and mouth.

The Murat River, also called Eastern Euphrates (Turkish: Murat Nehri, Kurdish: Çemê Miradê, Armenian: Արածանի, romanized: Aratsani), is a major source of the Euphrates River. The Ancient Greeks and Romans used to call the river Arsanias (Ancient Greek: Ἀρσανίας). It originates near Mount Ararat north of Lake Van, in Eastern Turkey, and flows westward for 722 km (449 mi) through mountainous terrain. Before the construction of the Keban Dam, the Murat River joined the Karasu River or Western Euphrates 10 km (6.2 mi) north of the dam site and 13 km (8.1 mi) north of the town of Keban.

In Muş Province, the river is interrupted near Toklu by the Alpaslan-1 Dam, which was completed in 2009. The Alpaslan-2 Dam was completed in 2021 and is located downstream of Alpaslan-1. The river merges into the reservoir of the Keban Dam, at one time Turkey's largest dam, which was completed in 1974 and provides electrical power.

In Bingöl and Elazığ provinces, Kalehan Energy has four dams planned for the river: from upstream to downstream, the Upper Kaleköy Dam, Lower Kaleköy Dam, Beyhan I Dam, and Beyhan II Dam. The Beyhan I and Upper Kaleköy dams are already completed. Once completed, all four dams will have a combined installed capacity of 1,855 MW.

== Origin of the river name ==
The present name is usually connected with the Turkish given name Murat or the word from which that name derives, murat 'purpose, intention, desire'. But this may be folk etymology, so Hrach Martirosyan tentatively proposes derivation from Old Armenian mōrat, murat 'mud, marsh'.

=== Iron Age ===
The river was called Arșania in sources of the Neo-Assyrian Empire, and Arsanias in Classical Greek and Roman sources. Those forms may be derived from an earlier form of Armenian Արածանի Aratsani, which Armen Petrosyan derives from an Armenian descendant of the Proto-Indo-European root *h₂erǵ 'white, bright'. Armenian Aratsani may have developed from an earlier form *Artsani (whence Akkadian Arșania with the addition of the toponymic suffix -iya and Greek Arsanias) under the influence of many other Armenian toponyms beginning with Ara-.

== Geology and geomorphology ==
The main source of the Murat River starts in the Diyadin district of Ağrı. The Kocasu River, which originates in the Bingöl Mountains, flows into the Murat River by the village of Sarıpınar village in the Bulanık district after taking the waters coming from the Akdoğan Mountains.
