= Palu District =

- District
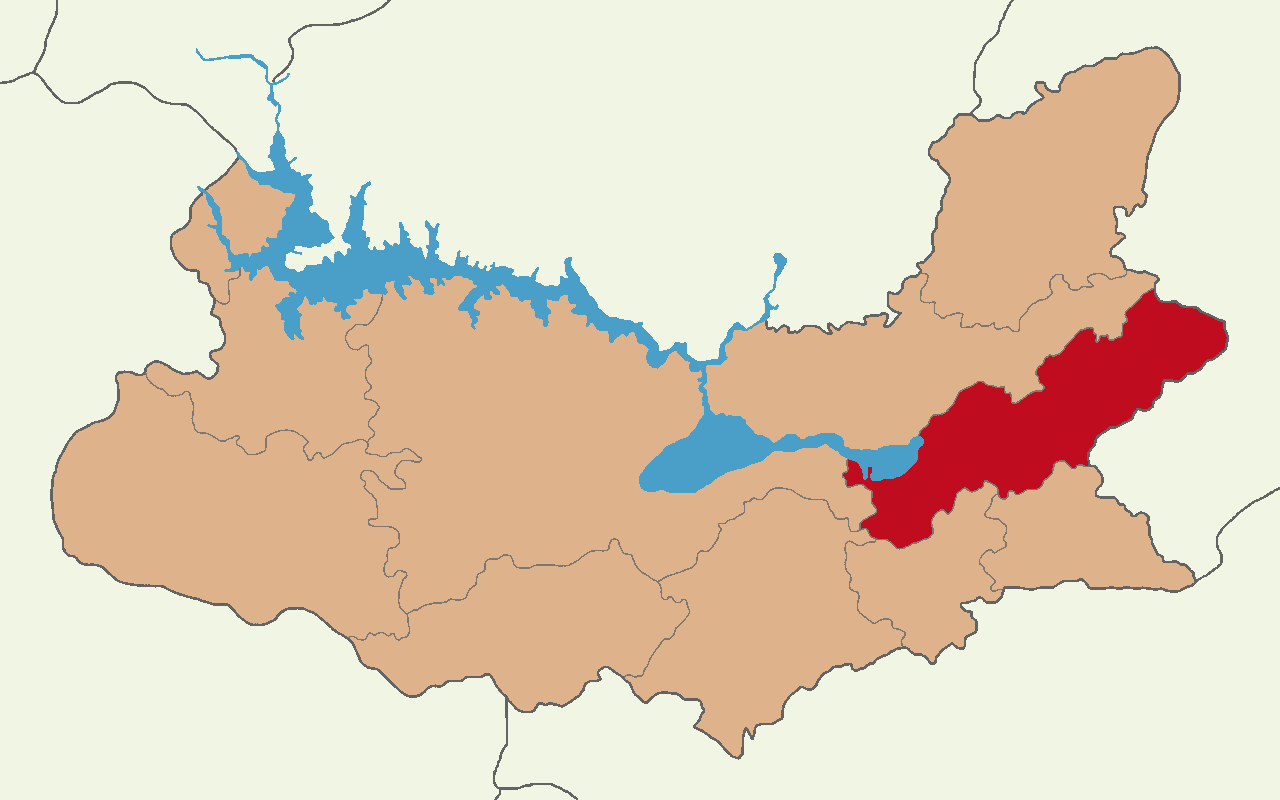
- Map showing Palu District in Elazığ Province

- Location in Turkey
- Coordinates: 38°42′N 39°57′E
- Country: Turkey
- Province: Elazığ
- Seat: Palu

Government
  - Kaymakam: Mustafa Demir
- Area: 730 km^{2} (280 sq mi)
- Population (2021): 18,648
  - Density: 26/km^{2} (66/sq mi)
- Time zone: UTC+3 (TRT)

Palu District is a district of Elazığ Province of Turkey. Its seat is the town Palu. Its area is 730 km^{2}, and its population is 18,648 (2021).

== Composition ==
There are 2 municipalities in Palu District:

- Beyhan
- Palu

There are 37 villages in Palu District:

- Akbulut
- Akyürek
- Altınölçek
- Andılar
- Arındık
- Atik
- Baltaşı
- Beydoğan
- Bozçanak
- Bölükelma
- Burgudere
- Büyükçaltı
- Damlapınar
- Gemtepe
- Gökdere
- Güllüce
- Gümeçbağlar
- Gümüşkaynak
- Hasbey
- Karacabağ
- Karasalkım
- Karataş
- Kasıl
- Kayahisar
- Kayaönü
- Keklikdere
- Kırkbulak
- Köklüce
- Küçükçaltı
- Örencik
- Örgülü
- Seydili
- Tarhana
- Umutkaya
- Üçdeğirmenler
- Yarımtepe
- Yeşilbayır
