= Beyhan I Dam =

- Location within Turkey
- Country: Turkey
- Location: Beyhan, Elazığ Province
- Coordinates: 38°45′6.96″N 040°8′8.78″E
- Purpose: Power
- Status: Operational
- Construction began: 2011
- Opening date: 2015
- Owner: Kalehan Energy Generation

Dam and spillways
- Type of dam: Gravity, roller-compacted concrete
- Impounds: Murat River
- Height (foundation): 97 m (318 ft)
- Height (thalweg): 83.6 m (274 ft)
- Length: 364 m (1,194 ft)
- Dam volume: 1,220,000 m^{3} (1,600,000 cu yd)
- Spillway capacity: 10,528 m^{3}/s (371,800 cu ft/s)

Reservoir
- Total capacity: 369,060,000 m^{3} (299,200 acre⋅ft)

Power Station
- Commission date: 2015
- Type: Conventional
- Hydraulic head: 77 m (253 ft) (gross)
- Turbines: 3 x 183.5 MW, 1 x 31.6 MW Francis-type
- Installed capacity: 582 MW
- Annual generation: 1,294 GWh (est.)

The Beyhan I Dam is a gravity dam on the Murat River near the town of Beyhan in Palu District, Elazığ Province, Turkey. The primary purpose of the 97 m (318 ft) tall dam roller-compacted concrete dam is power and it supports a 582 MW hydroelectric power station. Construction on the dam began in 2011 and its first generator was commissioned in March 2015, the other three that same year. It is owned by Kalehan Energy Generation.

== See also ==
- Upper Kaleköy Dam – under construction upstream
