= Elazığ railway station =

Railway station in the city of Elazığ, Turkey

ELAZIĞ
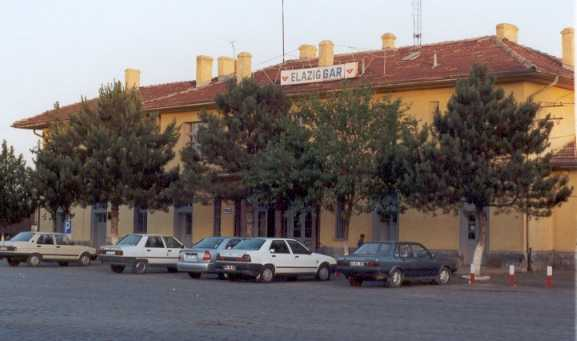
- Elazığ station building in June 2001.

General information
- Location: Harkaltı Sk. 57, Aksaray Mah. 23050; Elazığ Merkez/Elazığ; Turkey
- Coordinates: 38.6651°N 39.2227°E
- System: TCDD intercity and regional rail station
- Owner: Turkish State Railways
- Operator: TCDD Taşımacılık
- Line: Yolçatı-Tatvan railway
- Platforms: 2 (1 side platform, 1 island platform)
- Tracks: 2

Construction
- Structure type: At-grade
- Parking: Located in front of station building.
- Architectural style: Art deco

History
- Opened: 11 August 1934

Services
Preceding station	TCDD Taşımacılık	Following station
Yolçatı towards Adana	Euphrates Express	Terminus
Yolçatı towards Ankara	Lake Van Express	Yurt towards Tatvan
Terminus	Elazığ–Tatvan	Yurt towards Tatvan
Location

Elazığ station (Turkish: Elazığ garı) is a railway station in the city of Elazığ, Turkey. TCDD Taşımacılık operates two intercity trains to Ankara or Van, and Adana as well as one regional train to Tatvan.

The station was completed, by the Turkish State Railways, on 1 July 1934 and inaugurated on 11 August with a large ceremony. Originally, Elazığ was planned to be on the railway from Fevzipaşa to Diyarbakır but due to the difficult terrain, the route to Diyarbakır was chosen to diverge 24 km (15 mi) southwest at Yolçatı; nevertheless, a branch line was built from the junction to Elazığ. Unlike Malatya station, Elazığ was not built in the Art deco style instead consisting of a generic station building. When the railway was completed east to Tatvan, the Elazığ station building was enlarged to accommodate new offices and passenger traffic.
