= Our Lady of the Rosary Parish (Pirenópolis) =

Brazilian Catholic circumscription

- Paróquia Nossa Senhora do Rosário
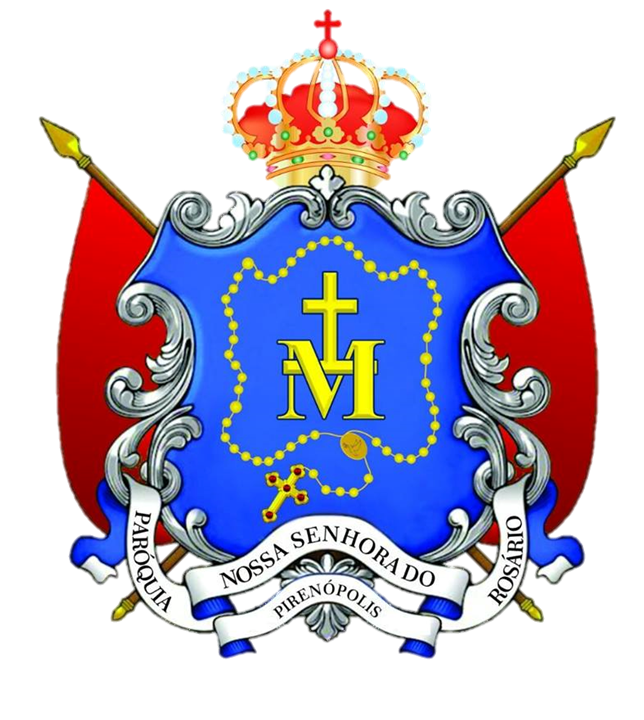
- Parish Coat of Arms

- Location of the parish

Religion
- Affiliation: Catholic
- Ownership: Roman Catholic Archdiocese of Goiânia; Roman Catholic Diocese of Anápolis

Location
- Location: Pirenópolis, Goiás; Brazil

Architecture
- Completed: October 07, 1736

Our Lady of the Rosary Parish is a Brazilian Catholic ecclesiastical circumscription located in the municipality of Pirenópolis, in Goiás, created in August 1736 with the establishment of Vila de Meia Ponte as a parish. Since its origin until 1745, it was part of the jurisdiction of the Diocese of Rio de Janeiro. Later, it became part of the Diocese of Goiás until 1956. Between 1956 and 1966 it was included in the territory of the Diocese of Goiânia, and from 1966 on, it has been in the Diocese of Anápolis, in Pastoral Region 03.

The Our Lady of the Rosary Parish has a considerable collection of material heritage in its territory, duly protected by municipal, state, and federal legislation. They are legacies preserved since the Brazilian colonial and imperial period, which consist of sacred images, lanterns and processional crosses, navets, palliums, scaffolds, bells, vestments, and other liturgical objects in silver and gold, deposited in chapels, churches, and museums. The Mother Church of Pirenópolis stands out, built by the Brotherhood of the Blessed Sacrament in 1728. In addition, there are other temples that influenced the urban growth of the city of Pirenópolis, its rural conglomerates, and other territorial portions that initially comprised partial or total parts of the current Diocese of Anápolis, Diocese of Formosa, Diocese of Uruaçu, Diocese of Luziânia, Archdiocese of Brasília, and Archdiocese of Goiânia.

The Our Lady of the Rosary Parish is a place that stands out for its popular Catholicism manifestations, an intangible heritage that is a great expression of the sociability of Pirenópolis. These manifestations are based on the traditional Catholic faith, on syncretism, on the diversity of symbols, and on the feasts that organize a specific culture, attracting not only the city's descendants who live in other places, but also tourists and visitors to see the performance of groups that have maintained the local culture for centuries. These customs are influenced by the European culture of the Portuguese who populated the city, especially the confraternities that dictated the local customs and knowledge from the 18th to the 20th centuries. Besides this, the presence of Afro-Brazilian cultural and religious manifestations is noticeable, whether in the ringing of the bells that are reminiscent of the congada and the Banda de Couro that accompany the celebrations, or in the influences of the people from the countryside, which are seen in the folias, the kermesses, the auctions, and in the simplicity of people's devotion.

Among the many festivities that take place in the Our Lady of the Rosary Parish are Holy Week, the Corpus Christi celebrations, the Feast of Mount Carmel in the Church of Our Lady of Mount Carmel, the Feast of Bonfim in the Church of Our Lord of Bonfim, and the Feast of the Good Death, among others. However, the Feast of the Divine is recognized as intangible cultural heritage by IPHAN and is world famous for its Cavalhadas, having been awarded in 2022 by the World Tourist Journalism Organization as the event of the year, receiving 30 thousand tourists in 2023.

== History ==
Due to the inexistence of official documents at the time, the origins of the Our Lady of the Rosary Parish are narrated by popular oratory, which relates it to the foundation of Meia Ponte, currently the city of Pirenópolis, that according to ancient local custom, has Our Lady of the Rosary as its patron saint, whose liturgical memory is celebrated on October 7. Only in 2021 a consensual agreement on the foundation date of Pirenópolis was established, with the Municipal Law Nº 941, which instituted October 7 as the city's foundation date.

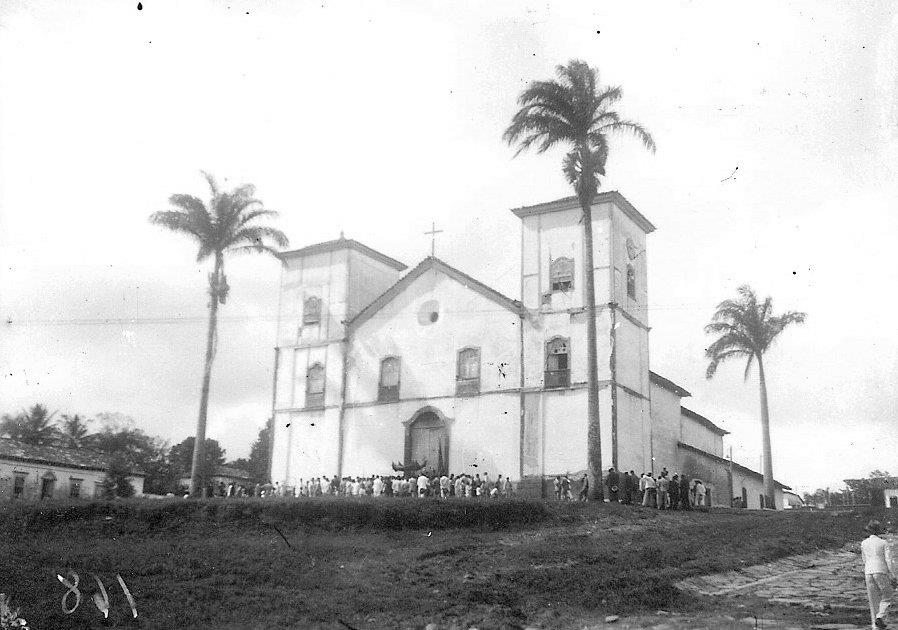
Palm Procession in Holy Week. Promoted by the Brotherhood of the Blessed Sacrament since 1728, Holy Week is the oldest local religious tradition, recorded here in the photo at the beginning of the 20th century.

However, it is known that in 1728, the society of the then Minas de Nossa Senhora do Rosário de Meia Ponte, with the proper provisions and licenses of the time, erected the Brotherhood of the Blessed Sacrament, which, as in other cities of the Brazilian colonial period, was the fraternity responsible for building the Mother Churches, the only ones that could have a tabernacle. The temple was built with characteristics of Brazilian colonial architecture and slave labor, by using the mixed technique of earth structure, stone masonry, and adobe, with ornamentation gradually produced in the following decades in the baroque, rococo, and neoclassical style altars.

In 1731, a mission of the Esmolares da Terra Santa was erected next to the current Coreto Square, founded in Meia Ponte by Friar João de Jesus e Maria, assisted by Friar Domingos de Santiago, and together, they also built the Hospice of the Holy Land, a network of hostels for Franciscan religious who traveled through towns and cities collecting alms for the conservation of the Holy Land, in Palestine. The company also established a presence in the cities of Salvador, Recife, Rio de Janeiro, Ouro Preto, Sabará, São João Del Rei, Diamantina, Goiás, Itu, and São Paulo. The convent of Pirenópolis was dedicated to Immaculate Conception.

According to the Baptistery Book that is still present in the parish archives, sections of the church were concluded quickly, since the first baptism in the Church of the Rosary took place in 1732, demonstrating the organization and agility of Meia Ponte, which aimed to be the capital of Goiás and seat of the Diocese. In 1734, the burials of the members of the Irmandade do Santíssimo and other authorities that took place there began to be registered in the obituary book. In this period, 15 diocesan priests were active, such as José Vieira de Paiva, José Pinto Braga, José Cardoso Marinho, Manuel Teixeira and Antônio de Oliveira Gago.

During this period, due to the many irregularities in the gold exploitation, murders and smuggling in the Arraial de Meia Ponte, the diocesan visitator Father José de F. Vasconcelos became chaplain as intervenor in 1732, being in charge of the Chapel of Our Lady of the Rosary until 1734, year in which Pedro Monteiro de Araújo assumed as the first provisioned priest, remaining in charge of the parish until 1741. During Monteiro's administration, the Chapel of the Rosary was upgraded to the condition of Mother Church, dismembered from the Parish of Saint Anne of Vila Boa, the first in Goiás.

In October 1737, the Book of Deaths started to register deaths in Corumbá de Goiás, where the Chapel of Our Lady of Peñafrancia, inaugurated in 1734 and subordinated to the Rosary Parish, began to be attended by Father Antônio Soares. The Chapel of Peñafrancia, elevated to the status of Mother Church in 1840, was the pioneer of the parishes of Abadiânia, Alexânia and Cocalzinho. The Portuguese influence of the Our Lady of the Rosary Parish replicated the traditions of Pirenópolis in the Chapel of Peñafrancia in Corumbá, such as the Brotherhood of the Blessed Sacrament, Holy Week celebrations, Feast of Saint Sebastian, Feast of the Divine, Choir, Orchestra and band in the masses and processions, as well as the Cavalhadas, held in the city in September during the patron saint's feast.

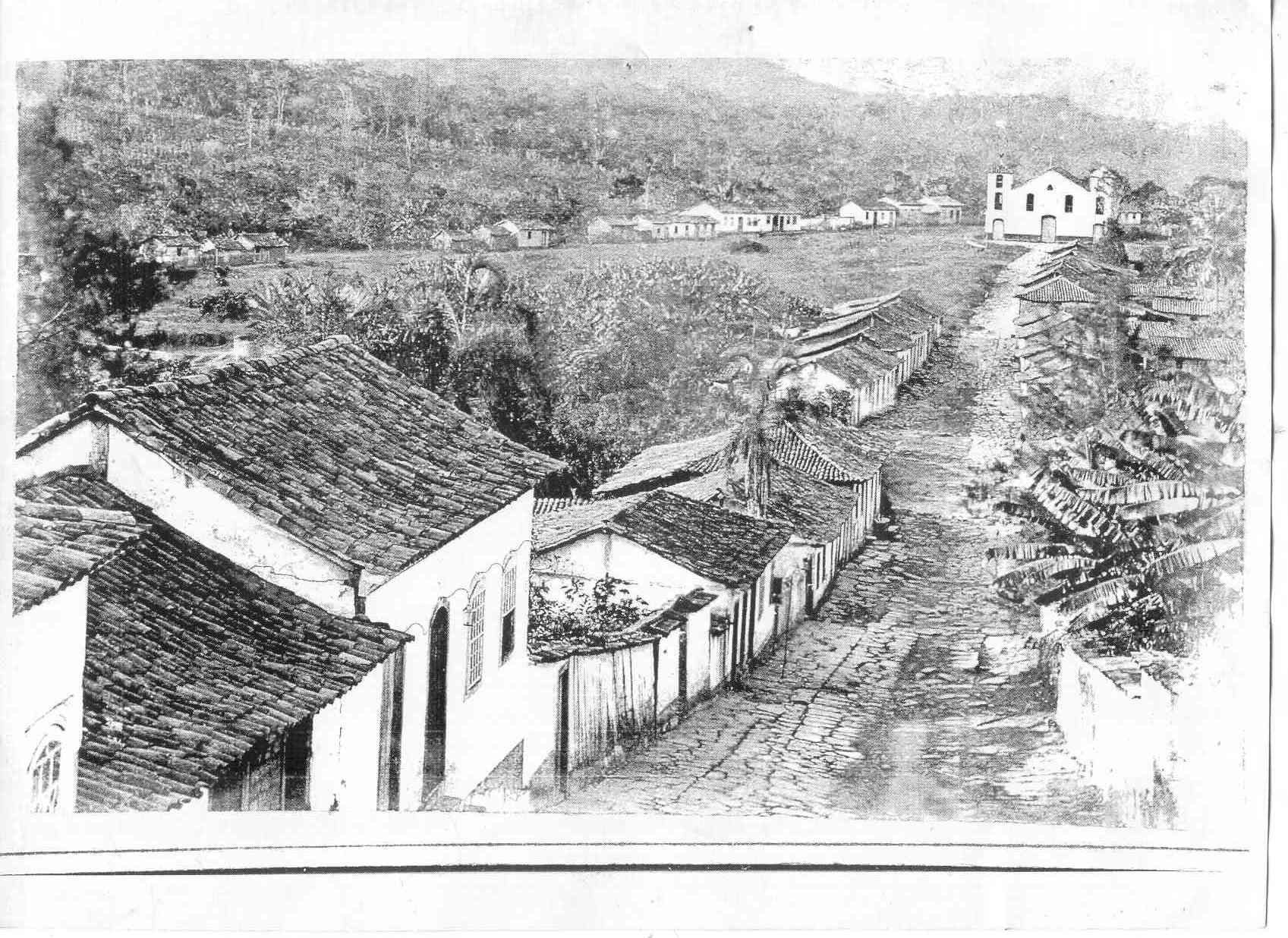
View of the Church of Our Lady of the Rosary of the Black People, around 1886.

On December 22, 1742, the Visitor Father José F. Vascocellos authorized the creation of the Brotherhood of Our Lady of the Rosary of the Black People, which, in 1743, began the construction of its headquarters, the Church of Our Lady of the Rosary of the Black People. As the works on the Church of the Rosary progressed, held by slaves on their Sundays off and built with characteristics of the Brazilian colonial architecture using the mixed technique of earth structure, stone masonry and adobe, with the main altar in baroque style and the altars of the nave carved in rococo style, the Brotherhood of the Rosary got its statute approved on August 22, 1758. At this time, with the organized structure, the Brotherhood of the Rosary started to celebrate the Reign of Our Lady of the Rosary in that church, always celebrated on the first Sunday of October and solemnly performed by the Brotherhood's Chaplain.

In this period, 03 other Brotherhoods were created in the Mother Church, with their respective side altars in the nave: Brotherhood of Souls of Saint Michael, Brotherhood of Saint Anthony and Brotherhood of Saint Anne, besides the Third Order of Saint Francis of Paola, also responsible for the construction of one of the side altars of the Mother Church. With the removal of the Esmolares from Terra Santa to Traíras, the third order began to administer the Hospice and Chapel until its transfer to the state government, which transformed it into an educational institution and eventually demolished it in the 19th century.

In mid-1746, the Chapel of Saint Lucy emerged in the jurisdiction of Luziânia, subordinated to the Rosary Parish. By decree of December 21, 1756, the Chapel of Saint Lucy was established as a parish. The Diocese of Luziânia, Diocese of Formosa and Archdiocese of Brasilia were created from the initial territory of the Luziânia Parish.

In 1748, in the current city of Jaraguá, the churches of Saint Joseph and Our Lady of Peñafrancia were completed in 1748, with the spiritual assistance of the Rosary Parish. As in Corumbá de Goiás, the customs performed in the Rosary Parish were reproduced in the Church of Peñafrancia in Jaraguá, elevated to the status of parish in 1833 and from it were created the parishes of the cities: Petrolina, Uruana, Goianésia, Rialma, Itaguaru, Santa Isabel and São Francisco de Goiás, which in turn originated the parishes of Jesúpolis.

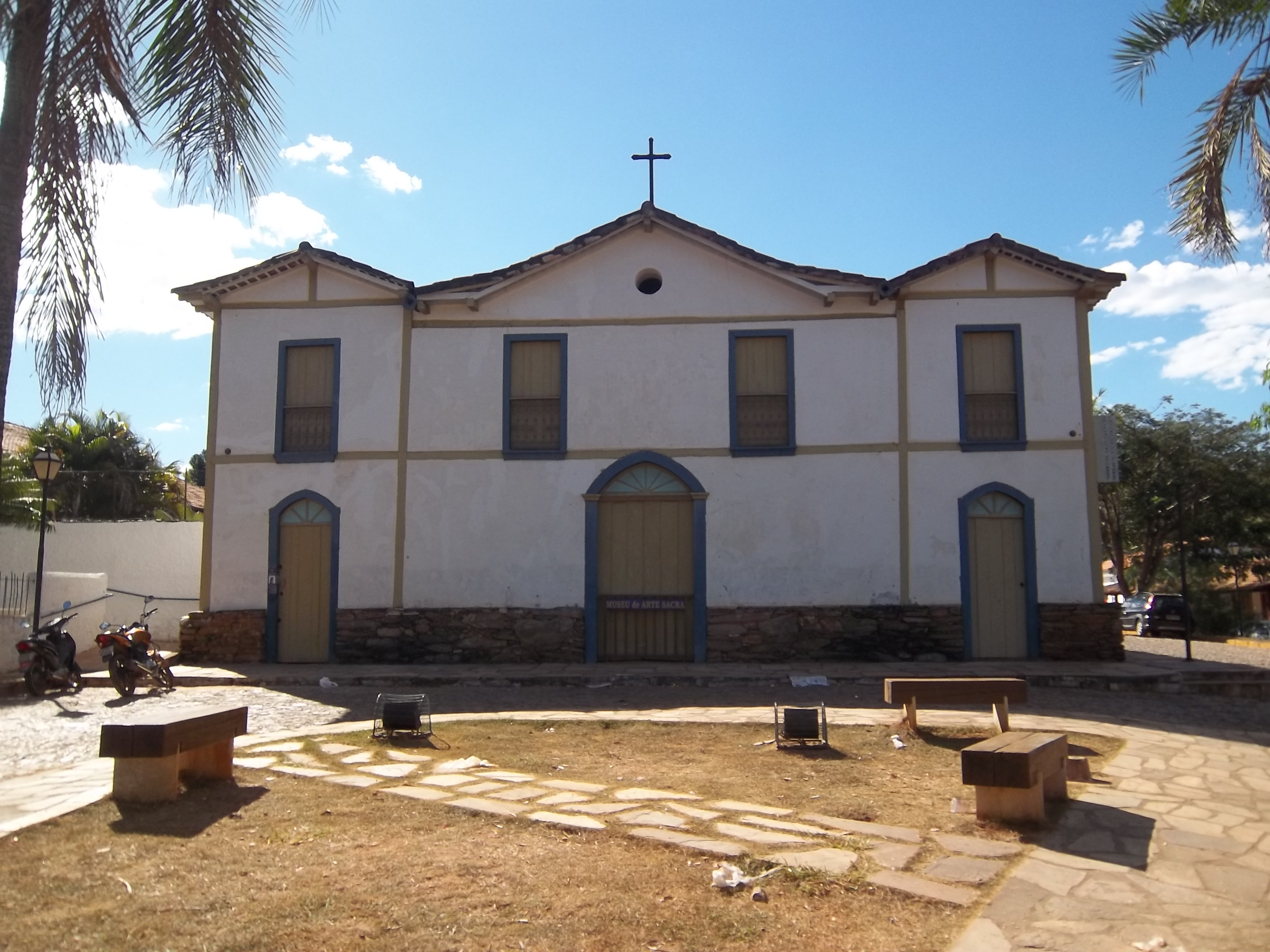
Church of Our Lady of Mount Carmel, built in 1750

In 1750, Luciano da Costa Teixeira and his son-in-law Antônio Rodrigues Frota, using slave labor, built the private church of Our Lady of Mount Carmel on the right bank of the Almas River. The chapel was built in colonial architecture, earth structure, stone stonework and adobe, and was endowed with everything necessary for divine worship. In the 19th century, after the death of the benefactors, who were buried in the church and left no heirs, the property of the church was included in the parish. The church has baroque and rococo carvings, and preserves altarpieces and pieces from the demolition of other temples in the city, which today make up the local Museum of Sacred Art. In 1940 the brotherhood of Our Lady of Carmel was created there, but is now extinct.

Also in 1750, under the initiative of Sergeant-Major Antônio José de Campos and making use of slave labor, the Church of Our Lord of Bonfim was built of adobe and in earth structure. Considered one of the state's baroque gems, Sergeant Campos bought and brought an image of Our Lord of Bonfim from Salvador, and decorated it with rococo altars and paintings. In the 18th century, the Brotherhood of Our Lord of Bonfim, now extinct, was installed in this church. This fraternity used to sponsor weekly mass celebrations on Fridays, with choir and orchestra. The Church of Bonfim, in several occasions served as a substitute for the Mother Church when it was under repairs.

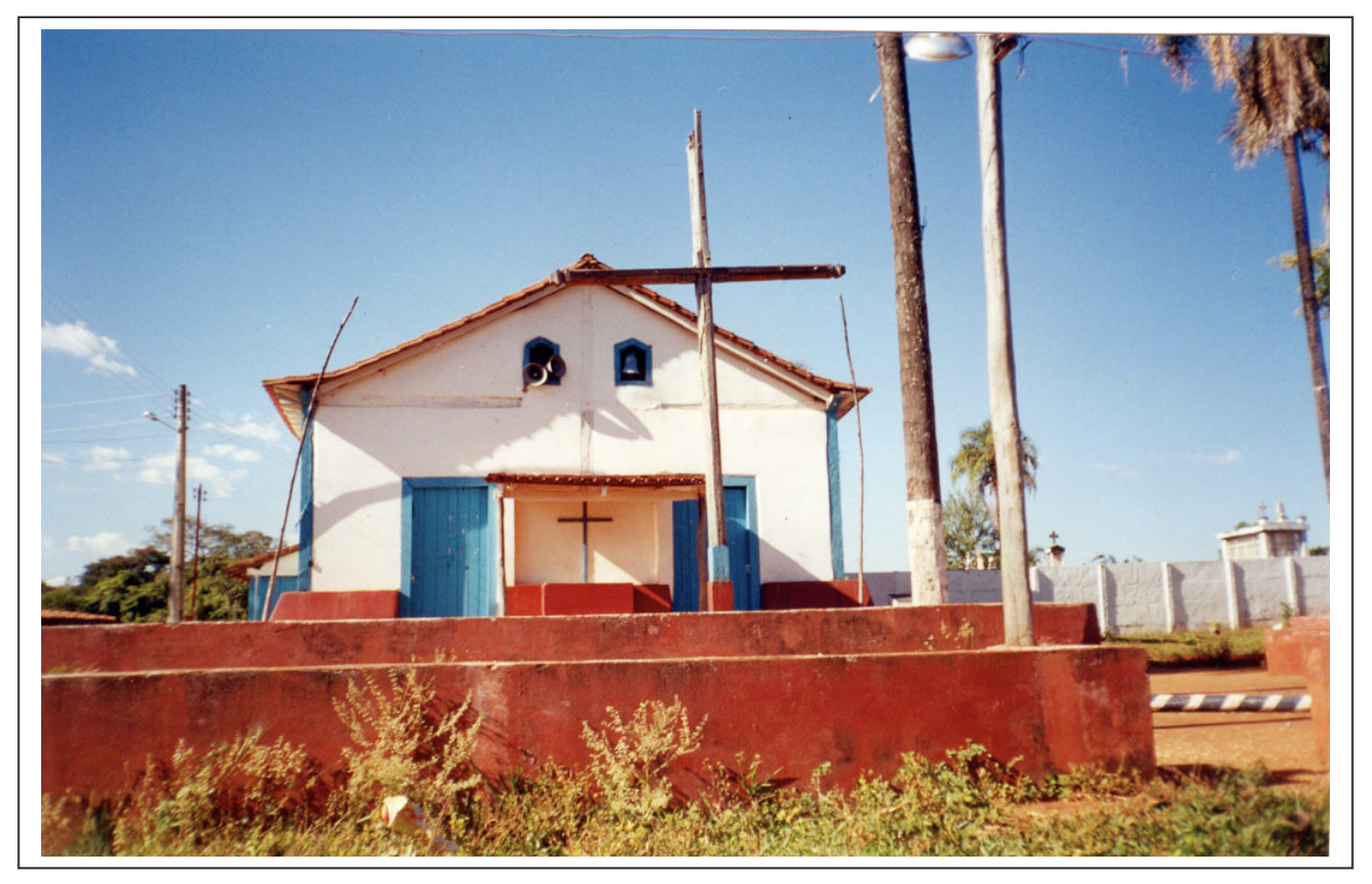
Current Chapel of Saint Anne, the third one built in the region. The first one was already in use in 1753.

The reputation of the gold deposits on the margins of the Peixe River brought many adventurers to the Chapel of Rio do Peixe region who were responsible for building the Chapel of Saint Anne that, besides being the patron saint, was considered the owner of the place, showing the presence of Catholicism in a landscape where the houses or ranches were simple and small, made of wattle and daub technique, adobe, with a roof of buriti leaves with a ground floor, of one or two pitches and single storey. The current one, the third one built, is located at the top of a square, a natural grassed elevated area, and has a facade with characteristics of the colonial period, formerly whitewashed and with turquoise blue frames, in a style that, at first, doesn't distinguish it from many others scattered throughout the recesses that sheltered populations in the Brazilian colonial period, and brings with it traits very characteristic of this period, such as having the local cemetery attached, being a great place of pilgrimage to the festivities celebrated there in July. In the mid-1980s, under the tutelage of the Goianésia Parish, the current temple underwent internal transformations, such as the removal of the original wood floor for a masonry and ceramic floor and lining with a plasterboard structure; two other rooms were added to the temple, one for the sacristy and the other to serve as the priests' dormitory during the festivities.

In 1757, the Church of Our Lady of Good Death of Lapa was built by the Brotherhood of Our Lady of Good Death of Lapa. Despite never having been finished, this temple had constant use, possessing valuable material goods such as silverware and other liturgical objects in addition to the image of Our Lady of Good Death. In 1869, the church was in ruins due to lack of repairs, leading to its demolition. All the images, vestments and furniture were transferred to the Church of Mount Carmel, where the image of the Good Death still stands today.

Also in 1757, as attested in the Books of Minutes of the Brotherhood of the Blessed Sacrament, the institution built the choir in the Mother Church, which enabled the beginning of sacred music in the city of Pirenópolis. At this time, through the sponsorship of the fraternities, several sacred orchestras began to perform Baroque music in Latin. The Brotherhoods also sponsored local musical production and composition; the local Antônio da Costa Nascimento stood out in this regard. The only remaining orchestra from centuries past and still performing is the Coro e Orquestra Nossa Senhora do Rosário, founded in 1893 together with the Phoenix Band. The Orquestra do Rosário still uses Latin and Baroque music, especially in traditional celebrations.

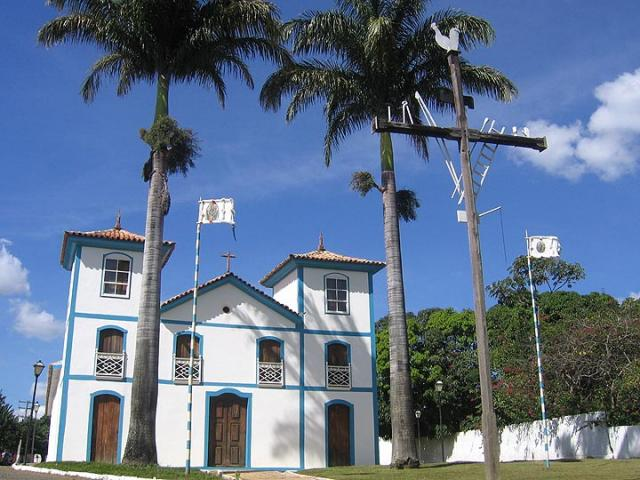
Church of Our Lord of Bonfim, built in 1750.

In 1811, the installation of the Brotherhood of Saint Benedict at the Church of Our Lady of the Rosary of the Black People was authorized. Like the Brotherhood of the Rosary, the Brotherhood of Saint Benedict concentrated a large portion of the black population. In the church of the Rosary, the Brotherhood of Saint Benedict was responsible for the maintenance of one of the side altars. Following the model of the Reign of the Rosary, the Brotherhood of Saint Benedict started the Feast of Saint Benedict, which is currently held on the Tuesday after Pentecost.

Despite being held since the mid-eighteenth century, only in 1819 the Feast of the Divine began to have the figure of the Emperor of the Divine. Initially, only influential people in society and members of the Brotherhood of the Blessed Sacrament could hold this position, but today it can be held by any resident of Pirenópolis. Manoel Amâncio da Luz had the Crown of the Divine made for the 1826 Feast, and donated it to the Brotherhood. It was also in the 1826 Festival that the existing practice of Cavalhadas was introduced or stimulated; in 2023, the feast received 30 thousand tourists.

On July 10, 1832, the district of Meia Ponte was elevated to town, and on November 18 of the same year, the first elections for the City Council took place. On April 14, 1833, the Brotherhood of the Blessed Sacrament gave the consistory to hold the council sessions, since there was no building designed for this purpose. Of the first 07 councilmen, 03 were priests of the parish and the others were members of the Brotherhood. The City Council operated there until it moved to a specific location.

In 1856, due to questions about public health, a discussion began in the city about the need to build a cemetery and to stop burials in religious temples. The City Council took action and required the region's farmers and ranchers to contribute financially to the project. In this period, most of the local population was rural, as the economy changed from gold mining to agriculture at the end of the 18th century. As the obligation imposed by the City Council did not work, the Brotherhood of the Blessed Sacrament, on its own initiative, built the Saint Michael Cemetery between the years 1867 and 1869, whose documentation still exists in the parish archive. Currently, the administration of the cemetery is the responsibility of the city hall; the entrance chapel and the chapel for celebrations, which still has an altarpiece with baroque traits, are currently Cultural Heritage of the Municipality.

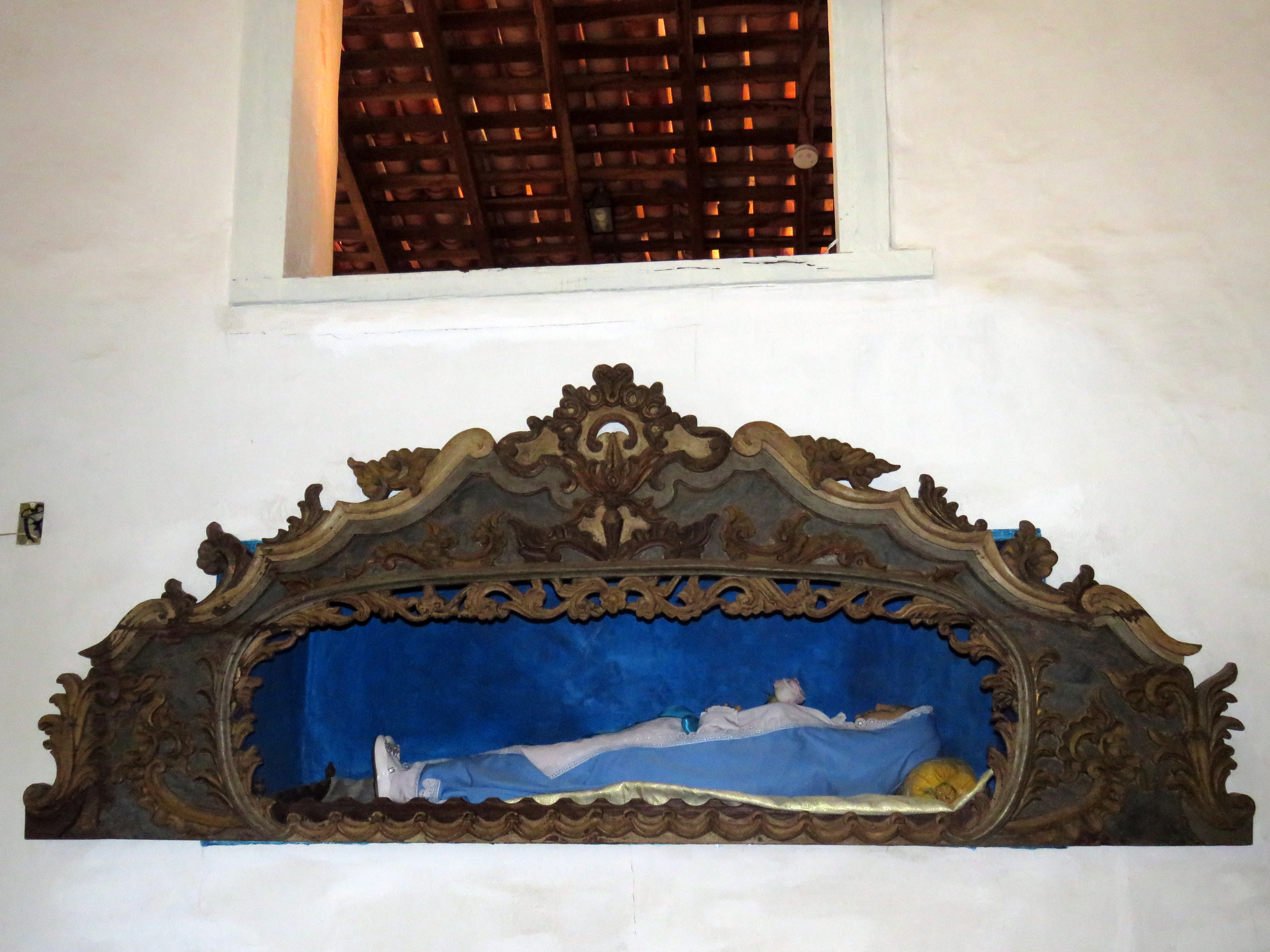
Image of Our Lady of Good Death, one of the few pieces left from the Church of Our Lady of Good Death of Lapa, now in the Church of Our Lady of Mount Carmel.

At the beginning of 1871, in the region of Sant'Ana das Antas, current Anápolis, the construction of the Chapel of Saint Anne began. Francisco Inácio da Luz became the first parish priest of this locality in 1873. Through the Saint Anne Parish were created all the parishes of Anápolis, today Diocese of Anápolis, besides the parishes in the cities of Nerópolis, Brazabrantes, Nova Veneza, Damolândia, Goianápolis, Ouro Verde de Goiás and Campo Limpo de Goiás.

On February 29, 1896, Dom Eduardo Duarte Silva emitted a decree in which he designated the Brotherhood of the Blessed Sacrament as the fabricator of the Mother Church. On March 22 of the following year, the confraternity unanimously elected Sebastião Pompeu de Pina to the position of fabricator, who exercised the respective functions until his death. On January 4, 1901, the Brotherhood of the Blessed Sacrament decided to acquire the house owned by Joaquim Gomes da Silva, located on the Vigário Nascimento Street, today Direita Street, for 1:300$000, to be the residence of the new vicar. After the death of Father José Joaquim do Nascimento, several priests visited Pirenópolis, but on a temporary basis. Once the aforementioned property was not purchased, on the following February 24, the confraternity decided to buy, for 1:500$000, the house at Nova Street, currently Pouso do Frade, which for decades was the parish house. With the improvements it needed, the property was valued at 4,000$000. As the Brotherhood only had $2,600,000 at the time, citizen Joaquim Pereira Vale lent the Brotherhood the sum of $1,400,000, interest-free. The first priest to occupy the house was the Italian Francisco Xavier Savelli who, in the same year, acquired in Rio de Janeiro an image of the Sacred Heart of Jesus that arrived on June 11 at the Church of Our Lord of Bonfim and from there, in procession accompanied by all the brotherhoods, the Euterpe Band and the Phoenix Band, was enthroned in the old altar of Saint Anthony in the Mother Church. Father Savelli also introduced the Apostleship of Prayer in the parish, which until today holds the celebrations of the Sacred Heart of Jesus.

In 1941, the Mother Church was registered as a National Historical and Artistic Heritage, under process number 241-T-1941, registered in the Book of Historical Records under number 165, on July 3, 1941. This registration included all its collection, according to the Resolution of the Advisory Council of SPHAN, on August 13, 1985, referring to Administrative Process number 13/85/SPHAN. At the same time that history was preserved through the registration of the Mother Church as historical heritage, the destruction of the Church of Our Lady of the Rosary of the Black People began. According to José Claudino da Nóbrega, during this period he bought several pieces of the old Church of the Rosary, and his salesman used the proceeds to help build a gymnasium, the former Colégio Nossa Senhora do Carmo, nowadays called Aldeia da Paz. He also says:

I went to Pirenópolis more than ten times. On one of them I bought a "pile" of carvings that was deposited in the sacristy of the Mother Church. The old comendador, who was in charge of everything, gathered the "brotherhood of the brown men of Our Lady of the Rosary" and, in the meeting, the sale was authorized, event registered in the minutes. The Brotherhood's treasurer received the payment and signed a receipt. He instructed a carpenter to provide wood and execute the packaging. When it was time for the truck to leave, the municipal mayor appeared, (who was from the Pina family) and embargoed the sale. I went to the district judge and, examining the documents I had in my hands, he told me that he would guarantee that the objects would be allowed to leave through the police. I left euphoric, but the joy didn't last, because the vicar informed me that both Professor Jarbas Jaime and the Curado brothers were against the deal. I preferred to return the goods and was promptly reimbursed. The Curados, doing justice to their aristocratic origin, spontaneously reimbursed me for the expenses incurred. Twenty-some years ago I went to Pirenópolis with the specific purpose of acquiring two chests of valuables. I found, in the nuns convent, some carvings from the old Church of the Rosary, the same ones that I had already bought and could not bring back. The most beautiful of all the images that belonged to that church was acquired by Mr. Renzo Pagliari in 1959. On this occasion I acquired from Prof. Jarbas an excellent chest of drawers "D. José", which I transferred to Mr. Hélio de Almeida Leite; today this piece decorates the Government Palace of São Paulo.

After the pieces were sold, included the main altar, the demolition of the Church of Our Lady of the Rosary of the Black People also began. The main altar had the image of Our Lady of the Rosary of the Black People enthroned, which today is located in the Church of Mount Carmel. In the two lateral niches of the main altar were the images of Saint Raphael and Saint Benedict. Both images were in the church on the day of the fire. However, the energetic reaction of the local population prevented it from being transported to São Paulo, and after the fire in the Mother Church, it is now installed as the main altar. The right side altar was dedicated to Saint Sebastian, whose image, taken to the Church of Our Lord of Bonfim, was stolen from there in 1978. The left side altar was dedicated to Saint Benedict, whose image is now in the Mother Church. The other images, ornaments, vestments, furniture, and other belongings of the temple were distributed among these three churches that still exist in the city today.

In mid-1953, through the initiative of Braz Wilson Pompêo de Pina, the Chapel of Saint Jude Thaddaeus was built in Carmo neighborhood, consecrated by Dom Emanuel Gomes de Oliveira, then metropolitan archbishop. With the construction of the chapel and the opening of the current São Judas Street, the urban occupation of the upper part of Carmo neighborhood took place.

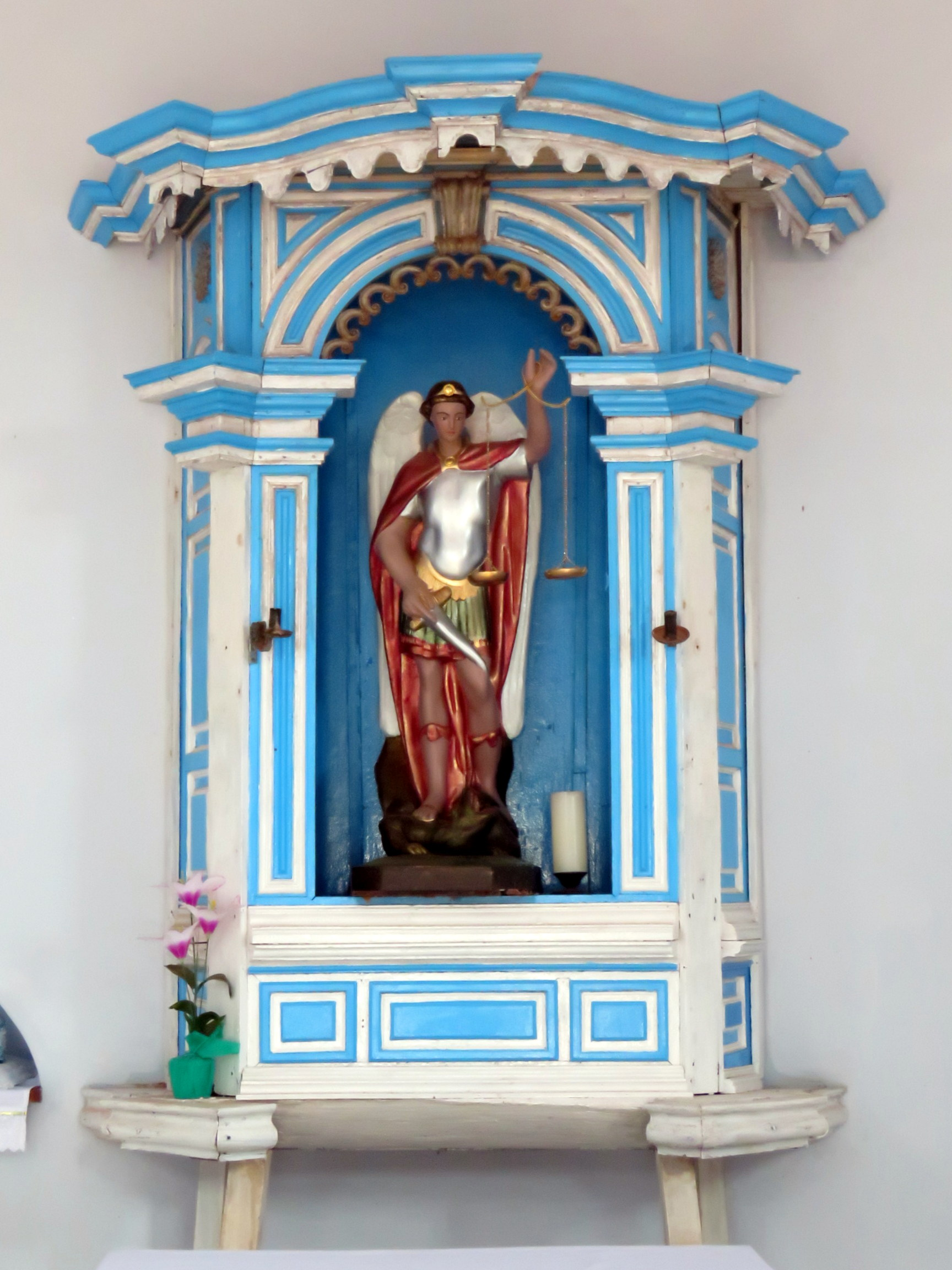
Saint Michael Cemetery chapel altarpiece.

In September 1978, the biggest theft of art pieces in Goiás occurred at the Church of Our Lord of Bonfim, at the time estimated at three and a half million cruzeiros. The pieces taken were from the 18th century, and included baroque images, silverware, and other objects, such as: one image of Saint Barbara and one of Saint Lucy, both French, one image of the Immaculate Conception and one of Saint Anne, and one of the Divine Eternal Father from Veiga Valle, besides four crucifixes and two wooden candlesticks. According to an article published in the O Globo newspaper, on November 1, 1978, the theft was attributed to Ivan Ferreira Santos, who went by the alias Sandra; he was arrested and then released. According to the report, Ivan had been arrested in Rio de Janeiro, also accused of stealing sacred pieces in São Paulo, Minas Gerais, Rio de Janeiro and in states of the northeast region. As for the location of the pieces from Pirenópolis, they are unknown to this day.

In 1989, with the registration of the Historic Center of Pirenópolis by IPHAN, the Churches of Bonfim and Mount Carmel, located within this perimeter, became National Heritage. On September 5, 2002, the Mother Church was burned to the ground, consuming the roof and the entire internal part of the building. In the same year, the emergency rescue work began. In 2004, the Canteiro Aberto exhibition was opened, and the inauguration of the reconstructed temple took place on March 30, 2006. Since then, the church has been in regular use, and has returned to being the main temple of the parish.

In 2010, the Feast of the Divine was recognized as a Brazilian Intangible and Cultural Heritage by IPHAN, and in 2019, the Brotherhood of the Blessed Sacrament and the customs initiated by it were declared Intangible and Cultural Heritage of the city. During the COVID-19 pandemic, in 2020 and 2021, the celebrations were held in an unprecedented format, without the presence of the faithful and transmitted by social media by the Pastoral of Communication, but without losing its traditional essence, with the use of baroque images, processions with music band and the chanting of the songs in Latin.

== Characteristics ==
=== Churches and Chapels ===
Overall, the urban area is formed by the communities where masses are celebrated and includes: the Mother Church of Our Lady of the Rosary, from 1728, the Church of Our Lady of Mount Carmel, from 1750, and the Church of Our Lord of Bonfim, also from 1750, as well as the Coreto Square, which is located on the exact spot where the Church of Our Lady of the Rosary of Black People used to be. In the same sense of occupation and respect for the local memory, on Saturdays, masses are celebrated in the Ermano da Conceição State School, where the Church of Our Lady of Good Death of Lapa used to be, in Alto da Lapa. In Carmo neighborhood are the Chapel of the Aldeia da Paz, belonging to the Missionary Sisters of the Poor, and the Chapel of Saint Jude Thaddaeus. In Vila Zizito, there is the Chapel of Our Lady of Fátima, while in the central region of the city, there is the Chapel of Saint Lucy, and in Residencial Luciano Peixoto, the Divine Eternal Father community.

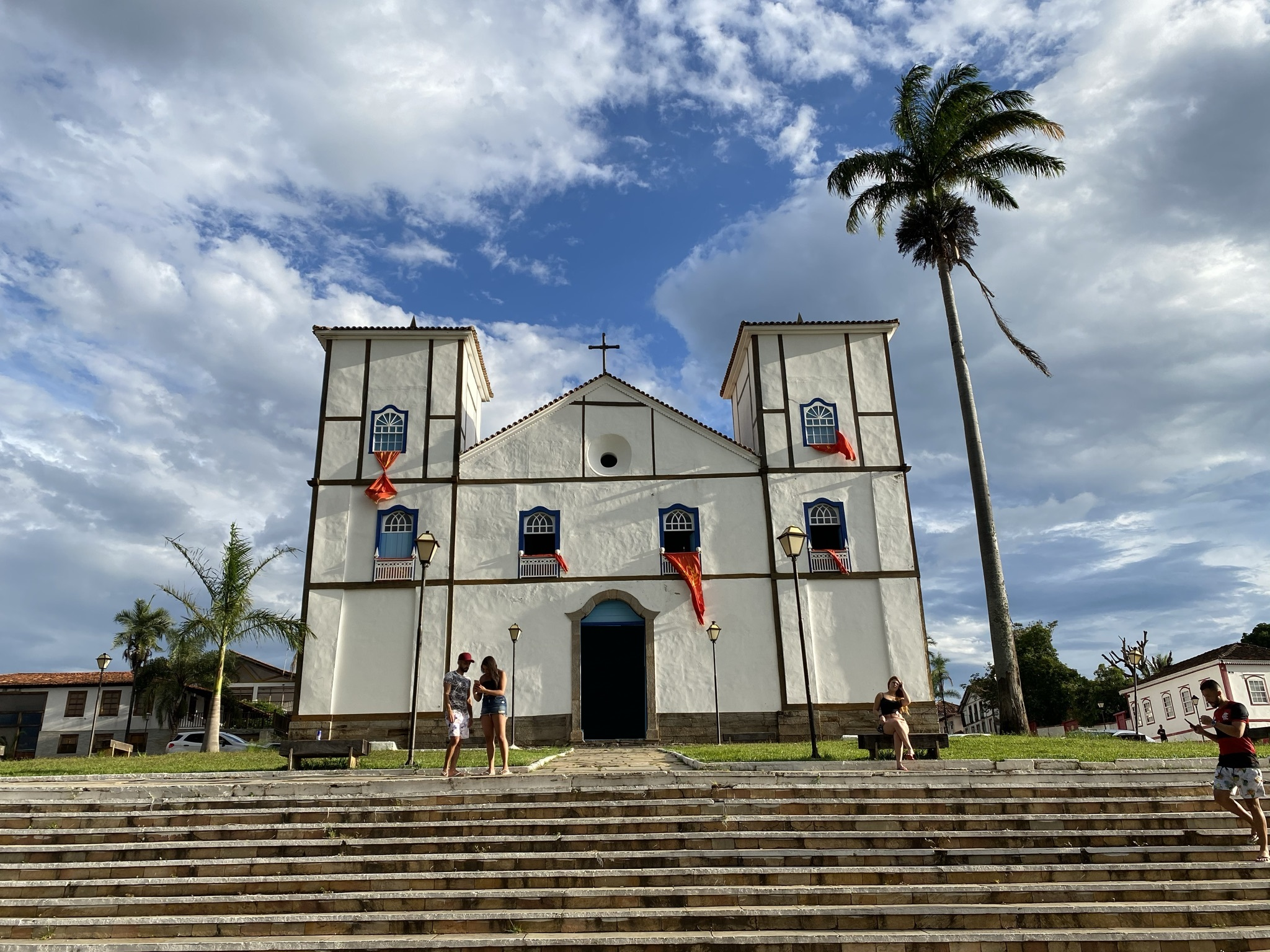
Mother Church of Our Lady of the Rosary

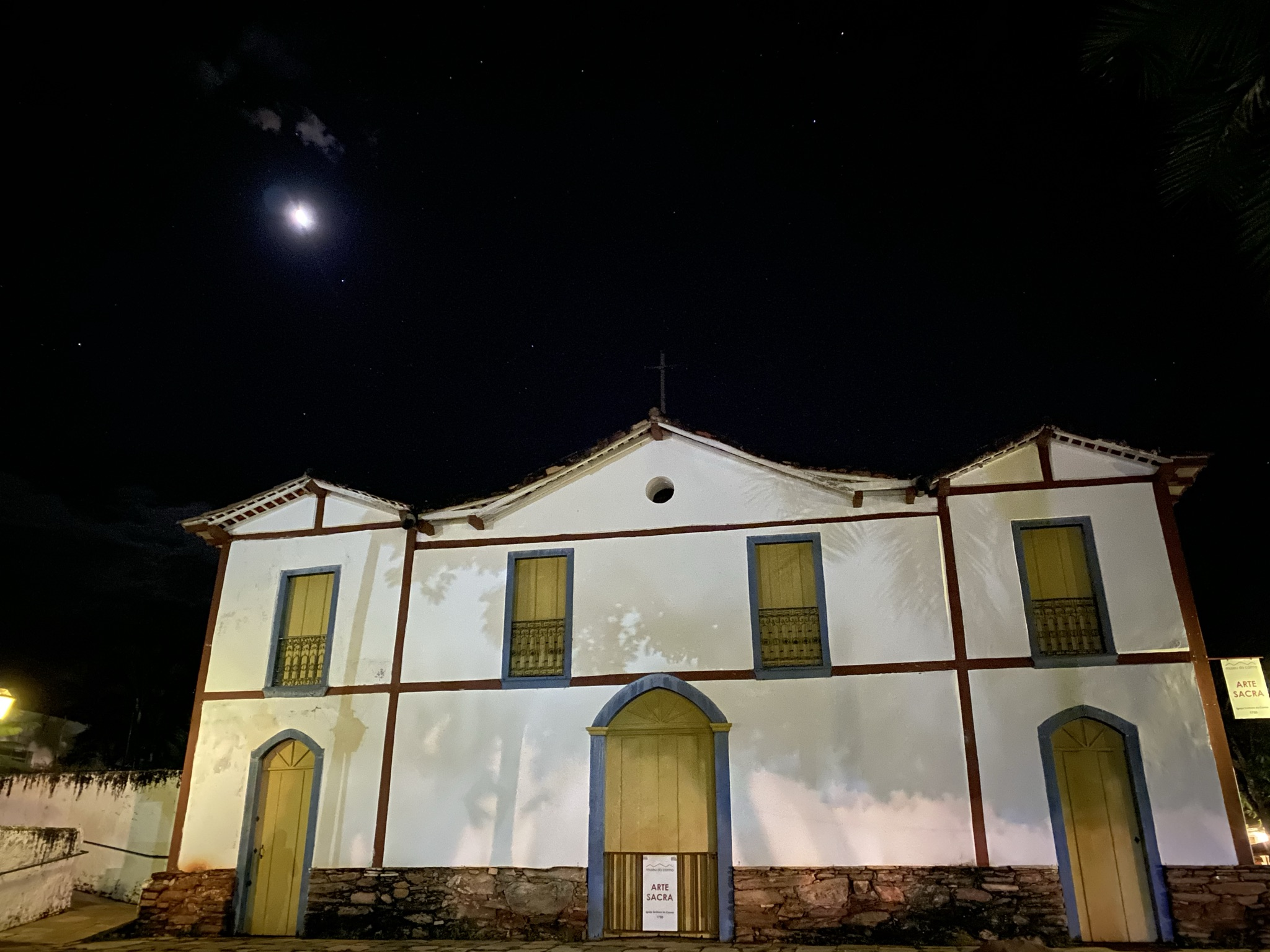
Church of Our Lady of Mount Carmel

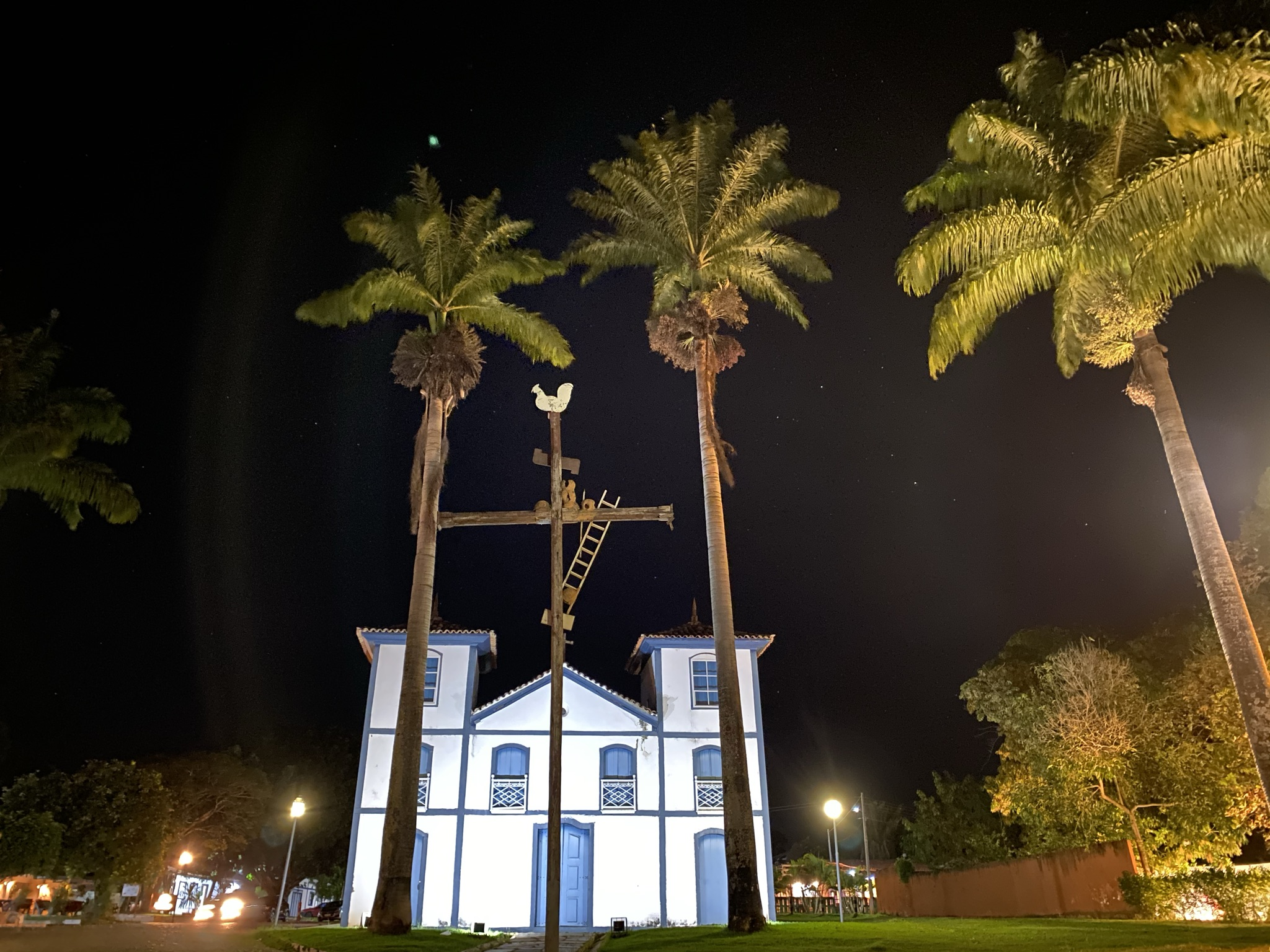
Church of Our Lord of Bonfim

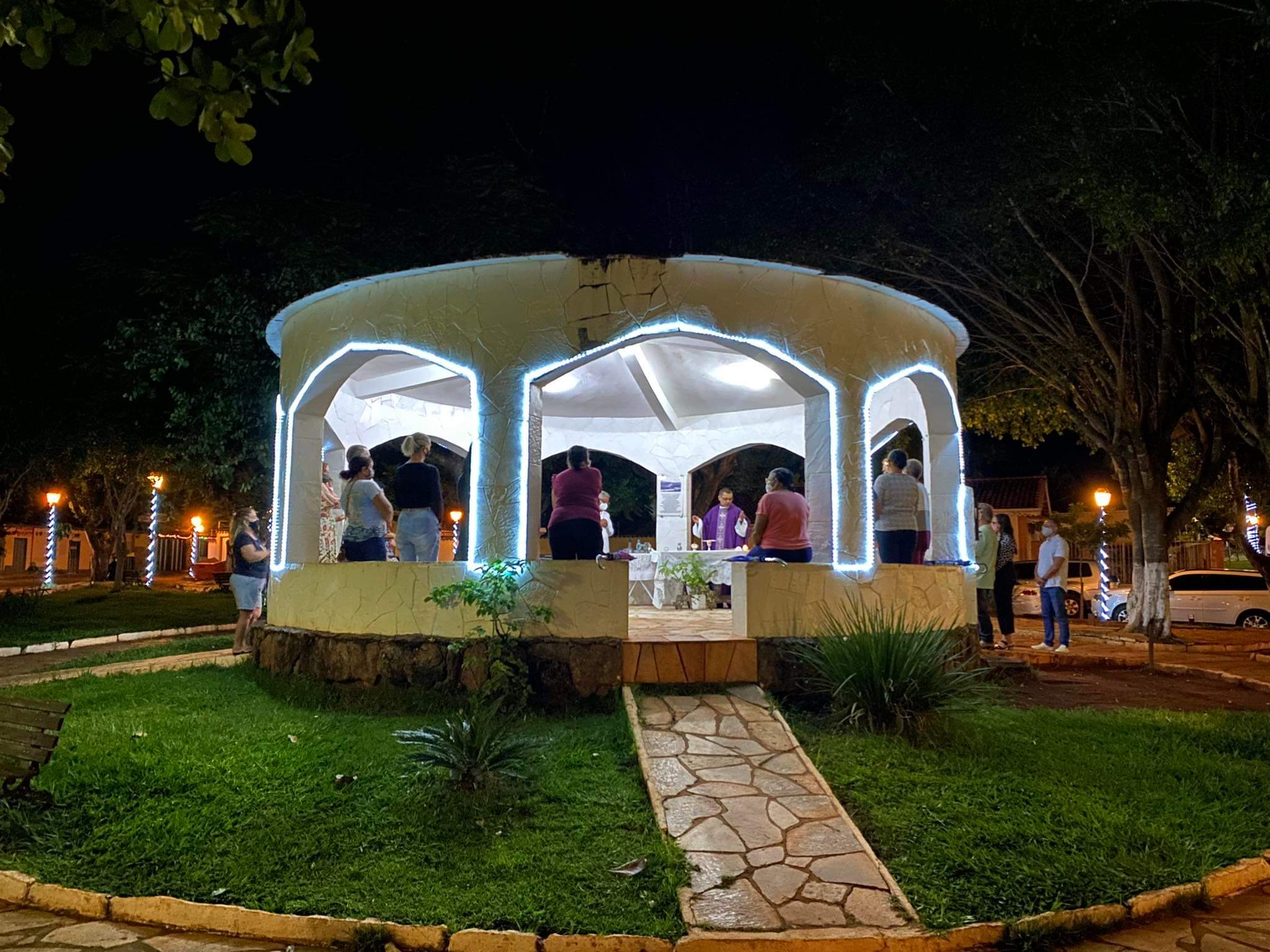
Mass at the memorial in the Coreto Square, site of the former Church of the Rosary of the Black People
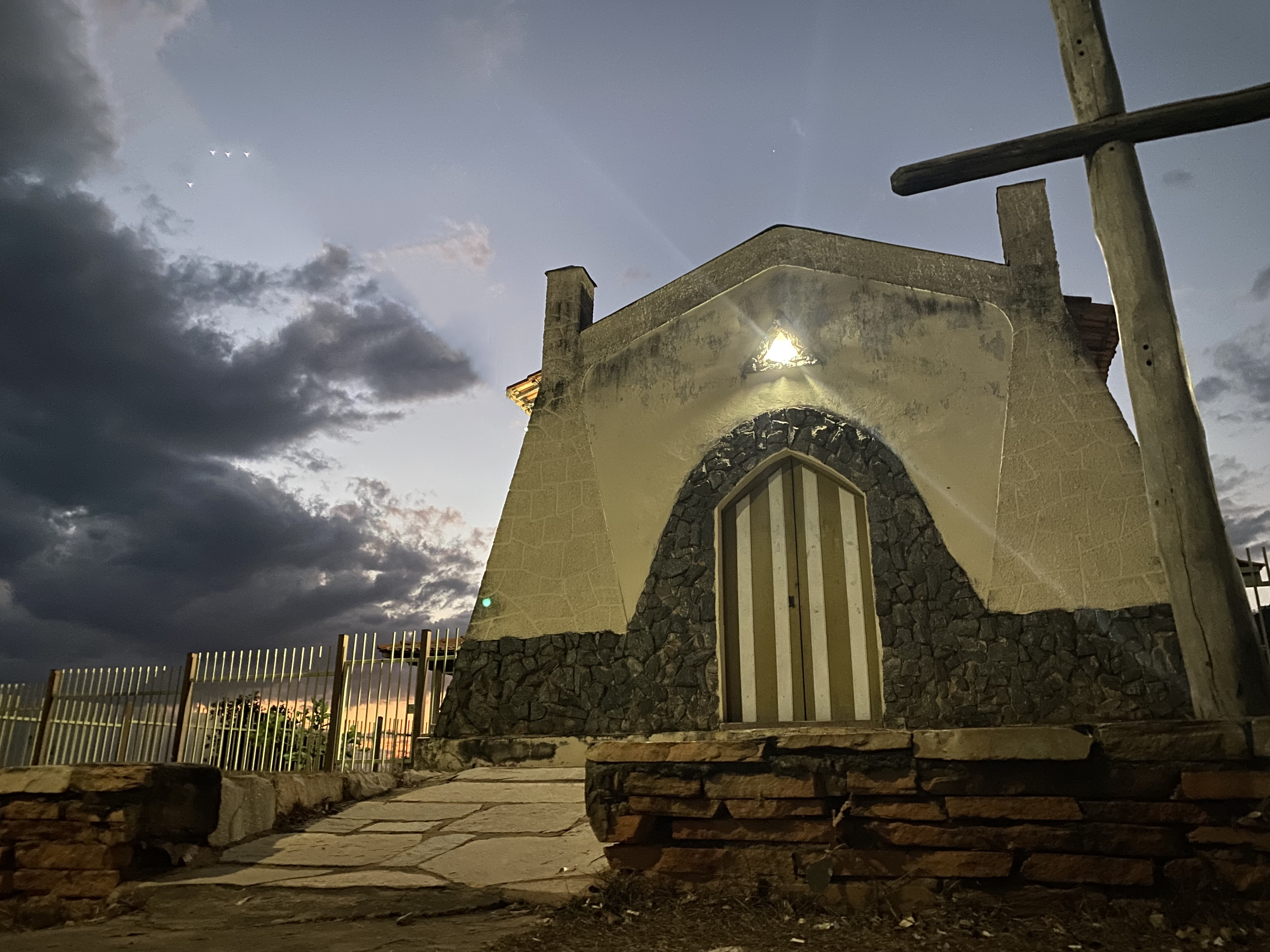
Chapel of Saint Jude Thaddaeus

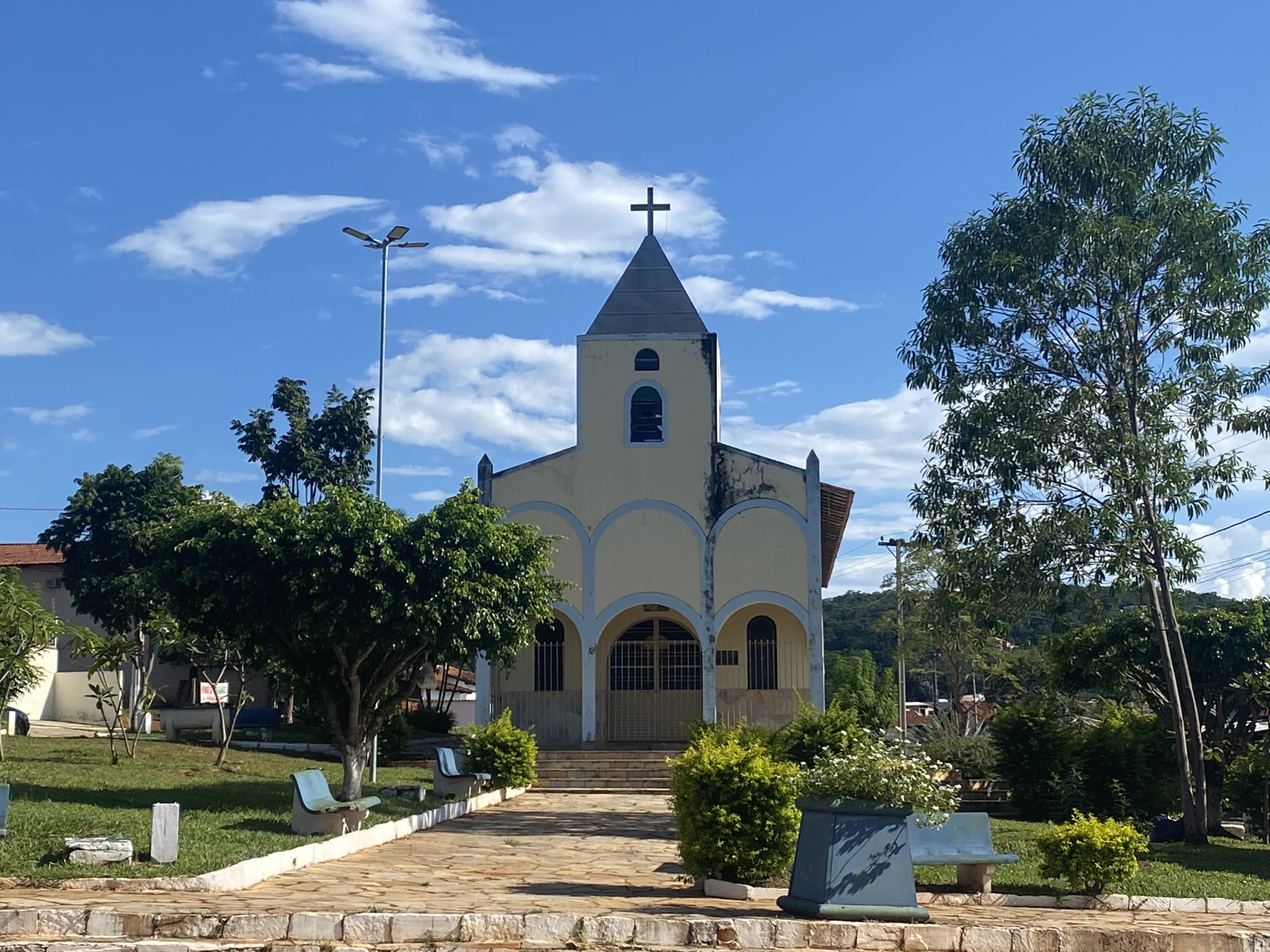
Chapel of Our Lady of Fátima

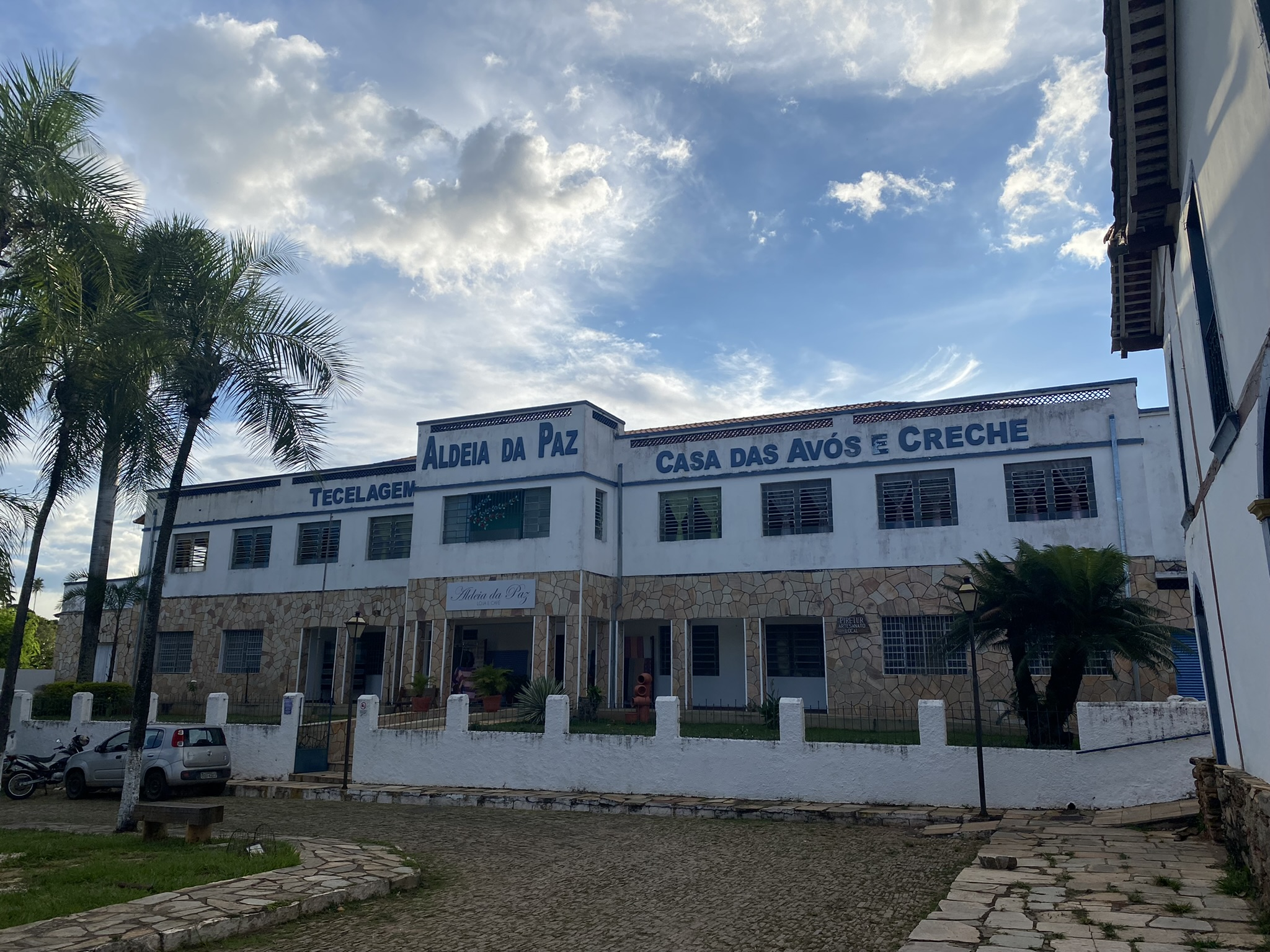
Aldeia da Paz, where the Missionary Sisters of the Poor reside

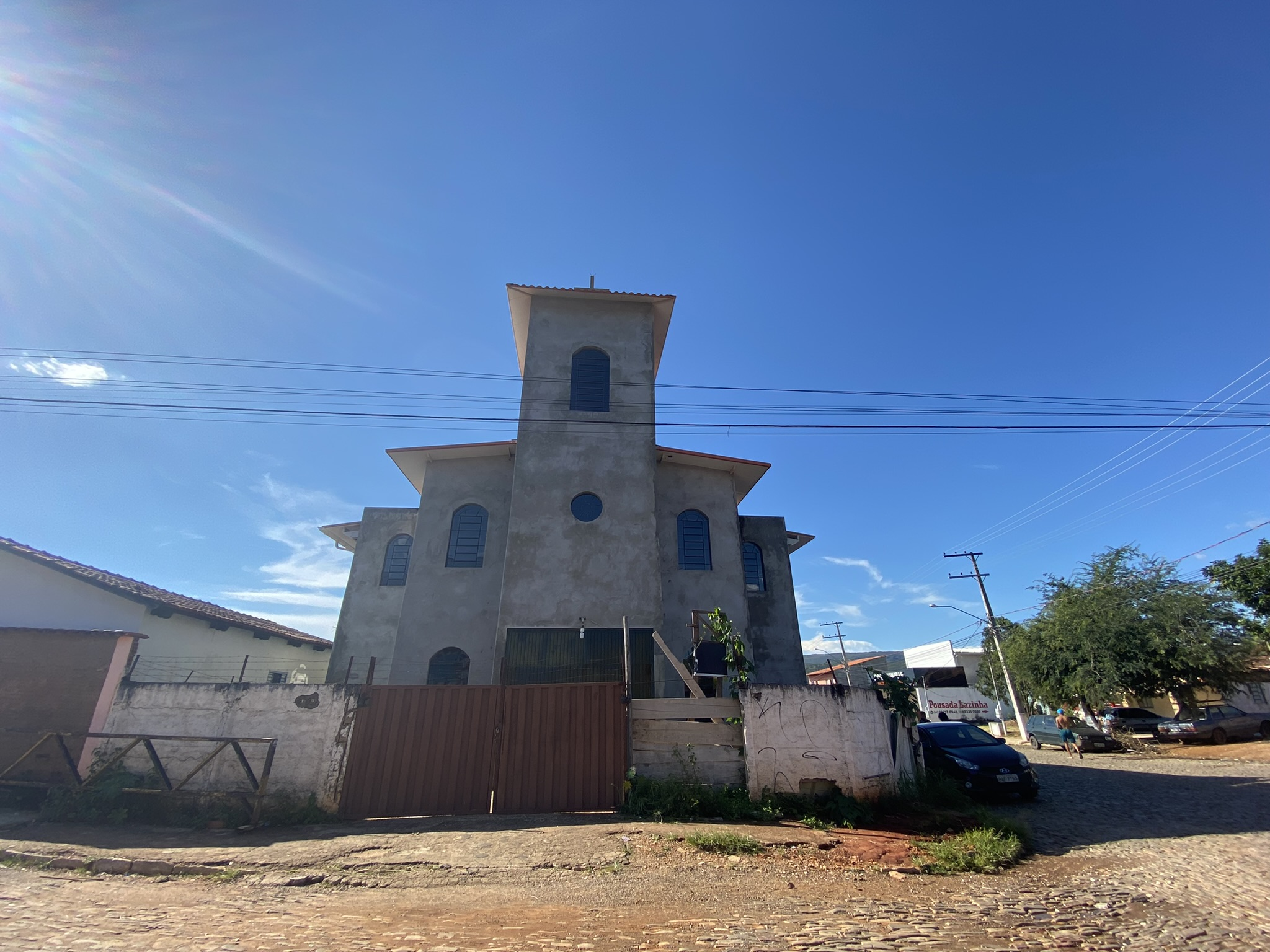
Chapel of Saint Lucy

The rural area has 11 chapels, as follows: Chapel of Our Lady of Aparecida in Soares Region, Chapel of Saint Lucy in Furnas Region, Chapel of Saint Monica in Chapada Region, Chapel of Saint Rita in Barbosa Region, Chapel of Our Lady of the Abbey in Retiro Region, Chapel of Saint Rita in Contendas Region, Chapel of Saint Benedictin the Region of Engenho de São Benedito, Chapel of Saint Joseph the Worker in the Region of Mar e Guerra, Community of Our Lady of Aparecida in the Region of Morro Grande, Chapel of Good Jesus in the Village of Bom Jesus and Chapel of Saint Anthony in the Village of Santo Antônio.

=== Feasts and celebrations ===
Since the beginning of the city, the religious celebrations have been great expressions of local sociability, based on the Catholic faith, on syncretism and on the diversity of symbols that have organized a specific culture that, to this day, is related to the society that participates in, organizes and preserves these customs.

Ladainha Rangel, from the traditional Novena for the patron saint in 2022.

Influenced by European people, especially the Portuguese who populated the city, a large part of the current celebrations still preserve a lively religiosity that is part of the memory and history of the local people, in which churches, secular sacred images, their own vestments, and vestments are still used. The African influence is also remarkable and visible in the daily life of the parish in the devotion to the patron saint, in the homes of the parishioners, who usually have an image of Saint Benedict in their kitchens, and in the ringing of the bells that recall the batuques, the congada and the Banda de Couro, as well as the numerous people baptized with the name Benedict. The life of the rural man is also present in the characteristics of the popular festivals through the folias, the kermesses, auctions and gifts that are usually donated in these festivals, in the simplicity and devotion of the people.

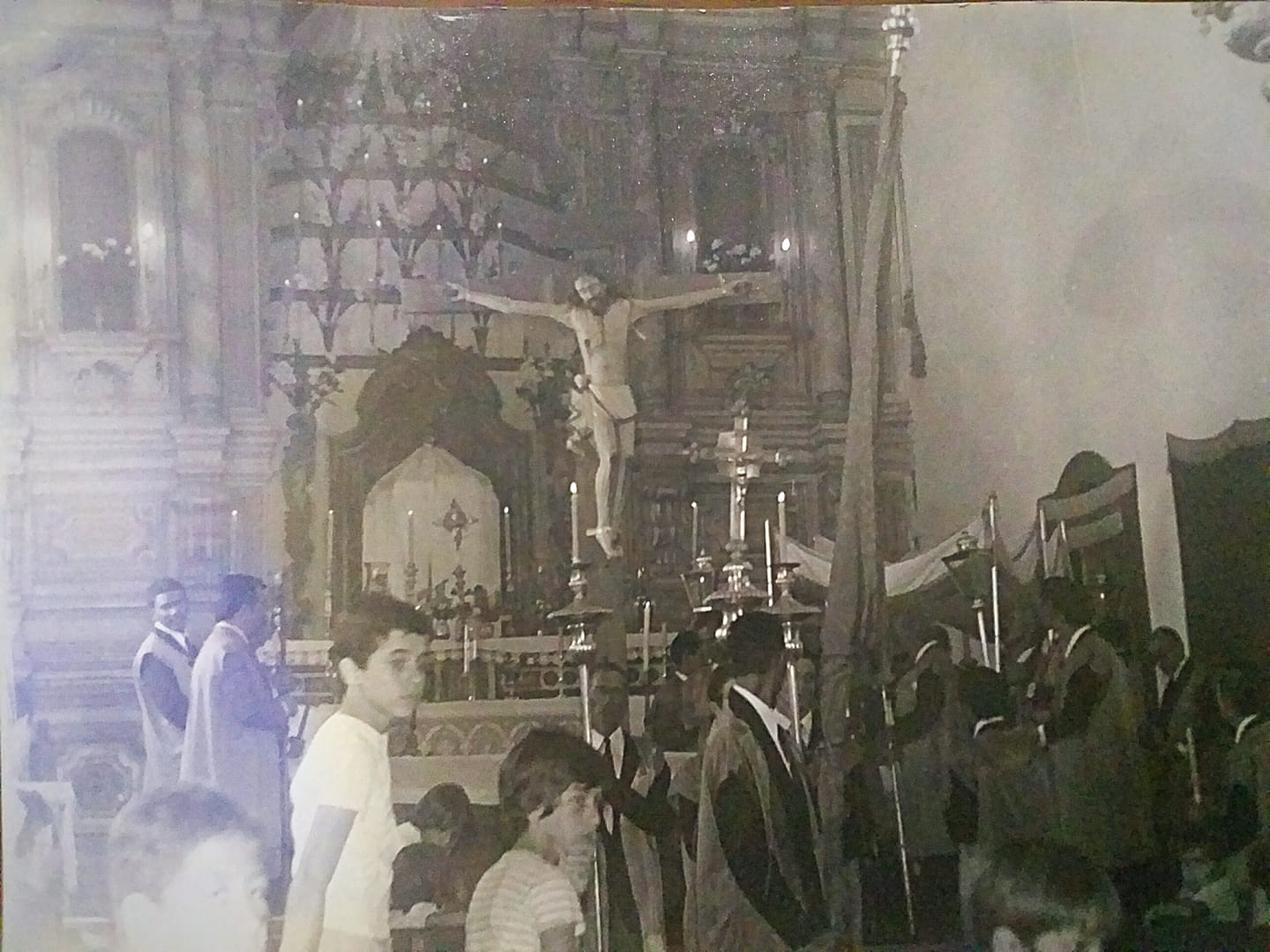
Celebration of the Lord's Passion, Holy Week in the mid-1960s.

For years, the Holy Week was the biggest celebration held in Pirenópolis, implemented at the very beginning of the city's establishment by the Brotherhood of the Blessed Sacrament, involving bands, orchestras, and the local community, customs that, for the most part, are still held, even during the COVID-19 pandemic in 2020 and 2021.

In addition to Holy Week, traditional celebrations have long included: the Feast of the Baby Jesus and Feast of Saint Sebastian in January, Lenten celebrations, Feast of the Steps, Feast of Sorrows, Feast of St. Joseph, Feast of St. Benedict between March and April, Corpus Christi, Feast of the Sacred Heart of Jesus, Feast of St. Anthony, Feast of Mount Carmel, Feast of the Good Death, Feast of Abbey, Feast of Our Lord of Bonfim, Feast of the Rosary (the patron saint), Feast of the Rosary of the Black People, Feast of Saint Jude Thaddaeus, Feast of Immaculate Conception, Feast of Saint Barbara, Feast of Saint Lucy, nativity scene prayers in addition to the Feast of the Divine, which is currently the festival of greatest projection, whose importance was confirmed in 2010 with the registration of such celebration as Intangible Heritage recognized by IPHAN, and also held the Reign of the Rosary and Court of Saint Benedict. In the Chapels and rural communities, the biggest devotion was to the Feast of Saint Anthony and Saint Gerald in the village of Santo Antônio, Feast of Good Jesus in the village of the same name, and other patron saints of the rural chapels mentioned in the section churches and chapels.

Over the years, the development and growth of the city, the romanization, the Second Vatican Council and adaptations to current times have shaped the characteristics that are visible today. As a result, many celebrations were simplified, adapted or even suppressed, especially between mid 1970 and 2000, the period when all brotherhoods were extinct, except for the Blessed Sacrament. Also during this time, new movements and forms of evangelization were introduced in the parish, pastoral activities were created, and events were organized to attract young people, which were strengthened after 2006 and in the following decade, events of great regional projection, such as the Youth Day, and other activities.

From 2012, there is the valorization of local culture and identity with the resumption of celebrations and festivals suppressed in the mid-1970s to 2000, in addition to the entry of young people into the Apostleship of Prayer, the Brotherhood of the Blessed Sacrament, the Choir and Orchestra Nossa Senhora do Rosário, and the Phoenix Band, highlighting the importance and harmony between past and present, well evidenced during the COVID-19 pandemic in 2020 and 2021.

==== Feast of Saint Sebastian ====
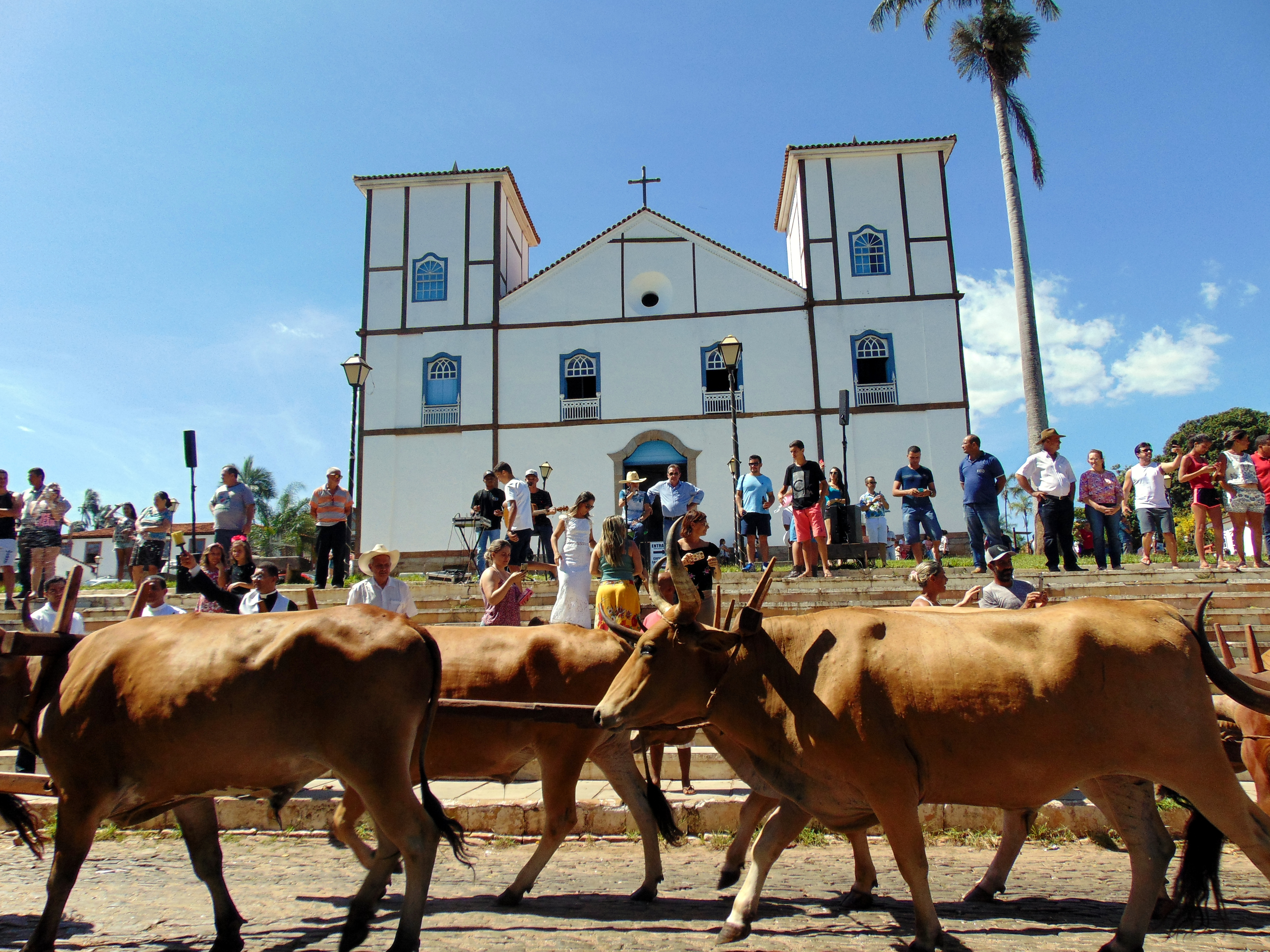
Parade of ox-cart drivers.

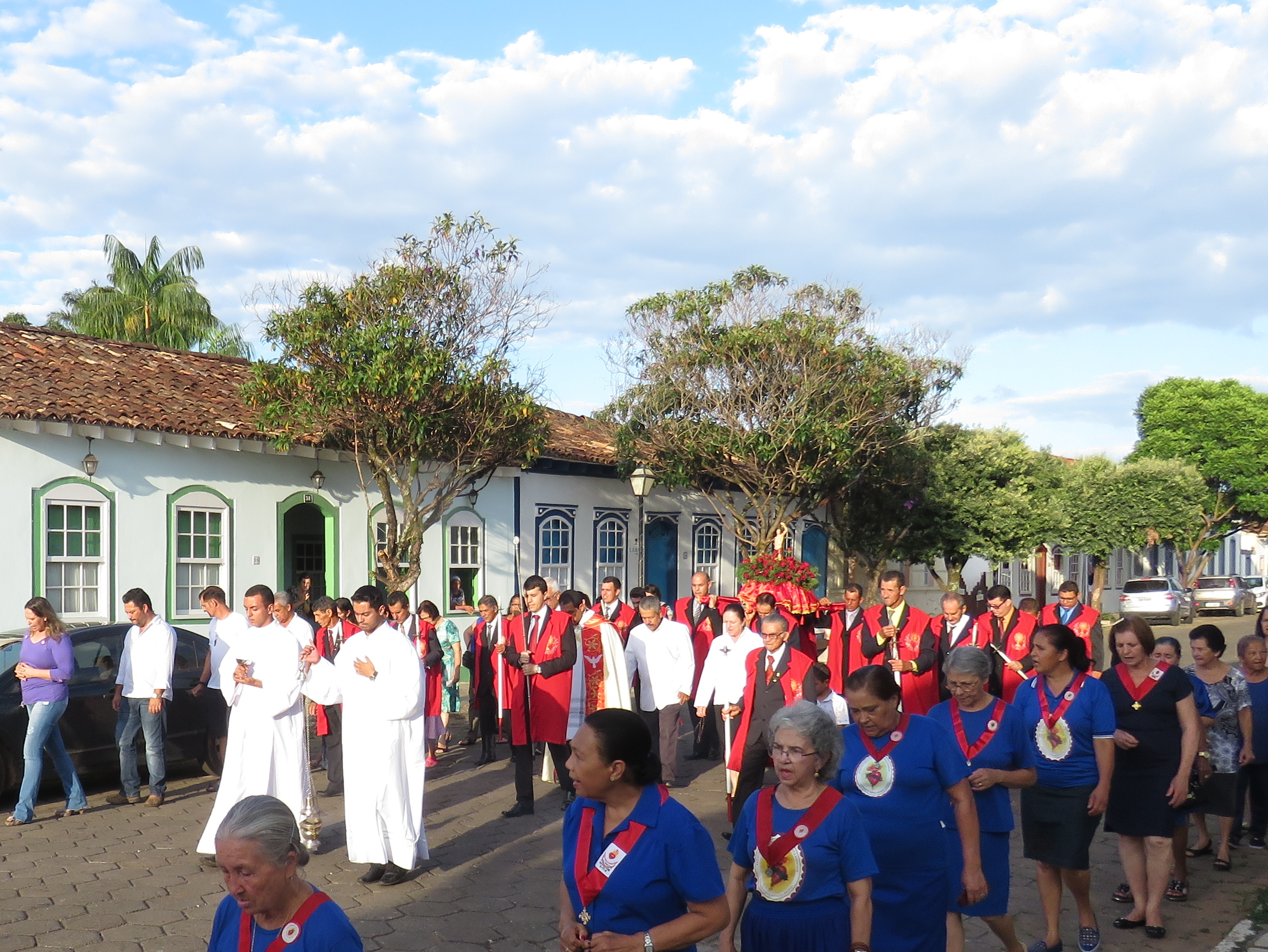
Saint Sebastian Procession.

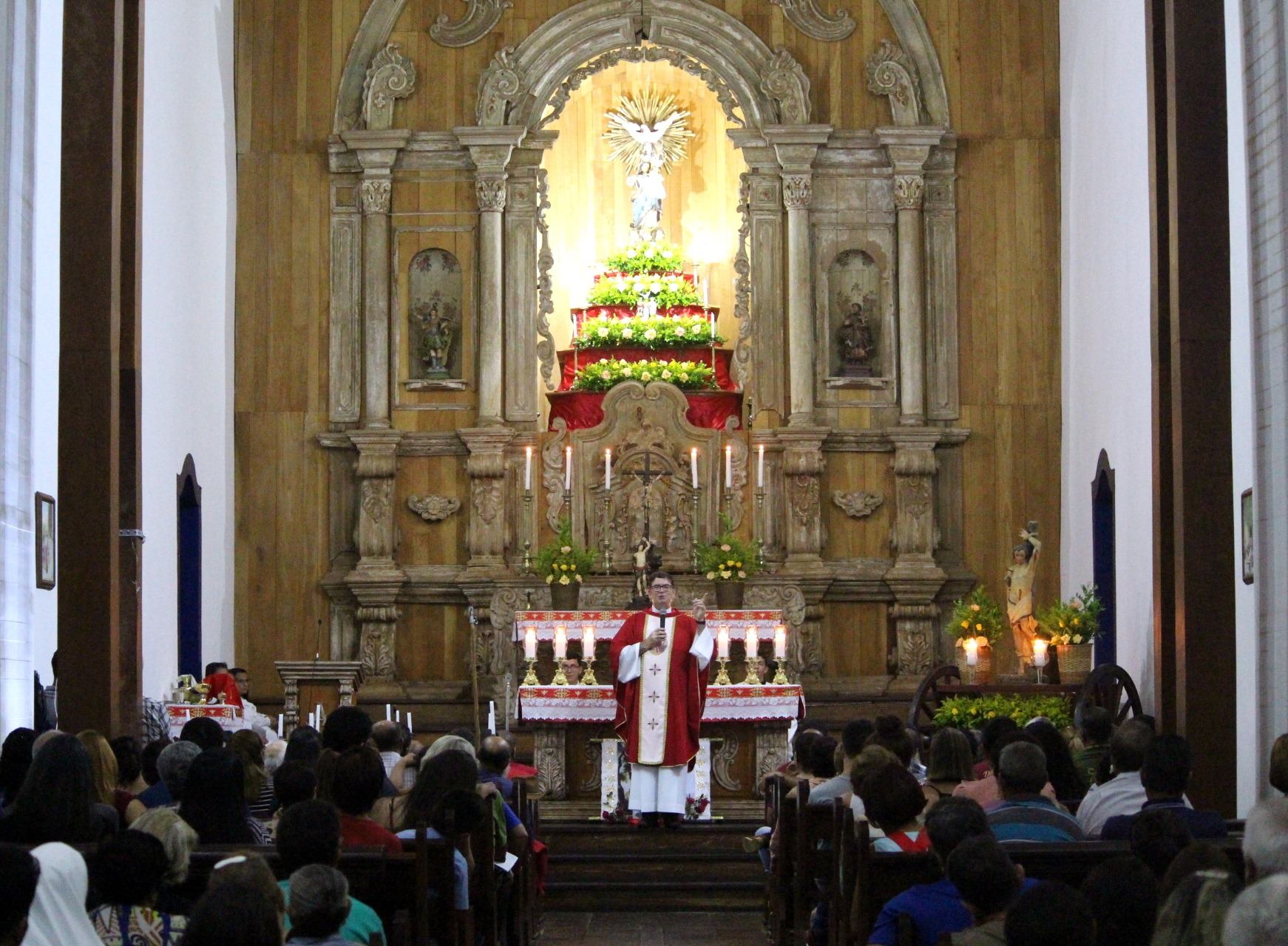
Festive Mass at the Mother Church of the Rosary.

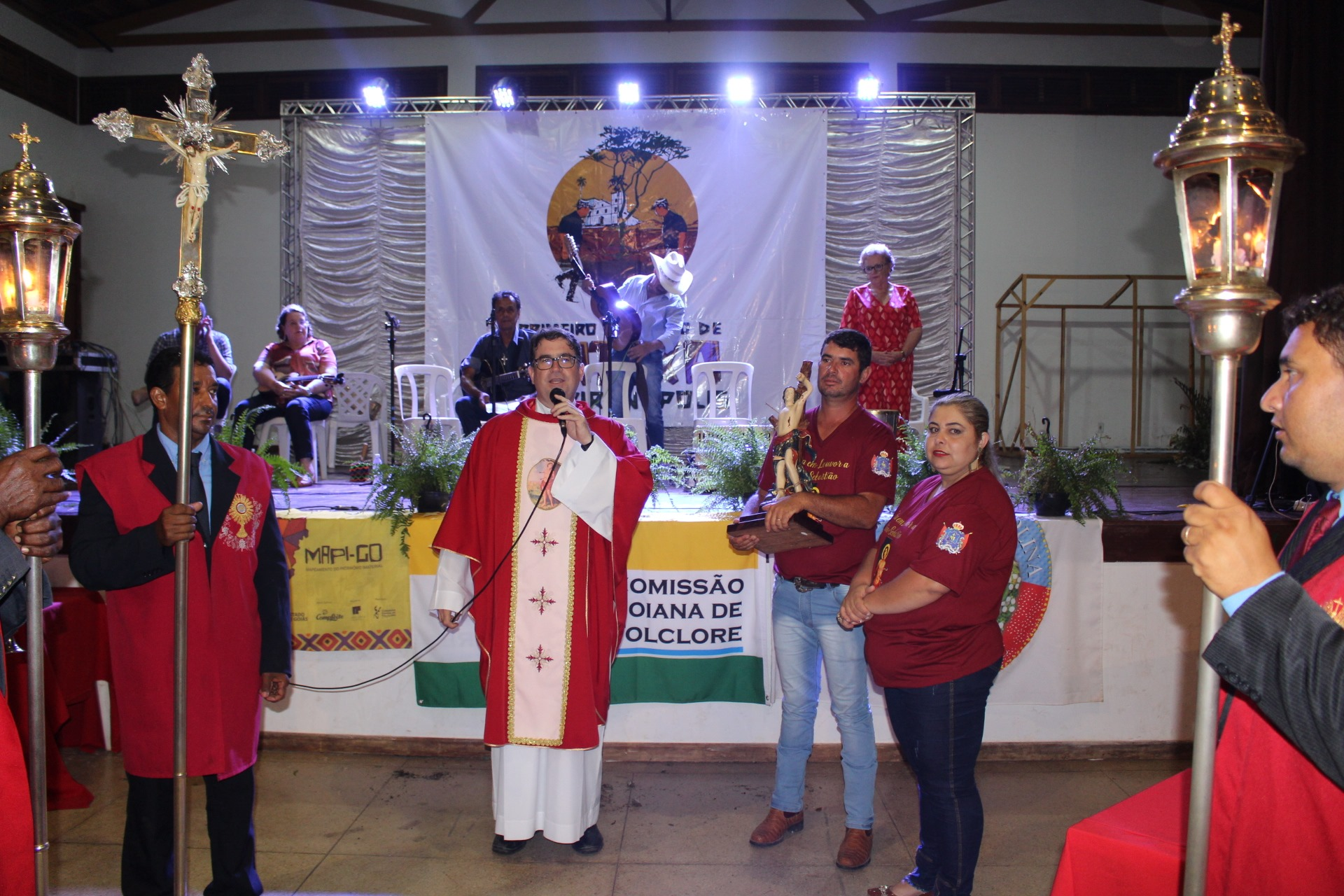
Kermesse, where typical food is served and regional singers perform.

Traditionally, the celebration of Saint Sebastian is the first novena held in the year in the parish. Since the 18th century, he was celebrated with great popular participation, orchestra in the traditional novena and music band in the Church of the Rosary of the Black People, where the right side altar was dedicated to him, and whose image, taken to the Church of Bonfim after the demolition of that church, was stolen from there in 1978. After the demolition of the Church of the Rosary of the Black People, the festivities are held in the Mother Church of the Rosary, and also include a kermesse, the raising of the flagpole, the burning of bonfires, and the auction of animals donated by local farmers as payment for their promises.

In order to value the local countryside culture, a parade of ox carts was added to the festivities that, on the morning of the last day of the novena, runs through the streets of the historical center, passing by the main historical buildings and stimulating local tourism

==== Week of Sorrows and Feast of the Steps ====
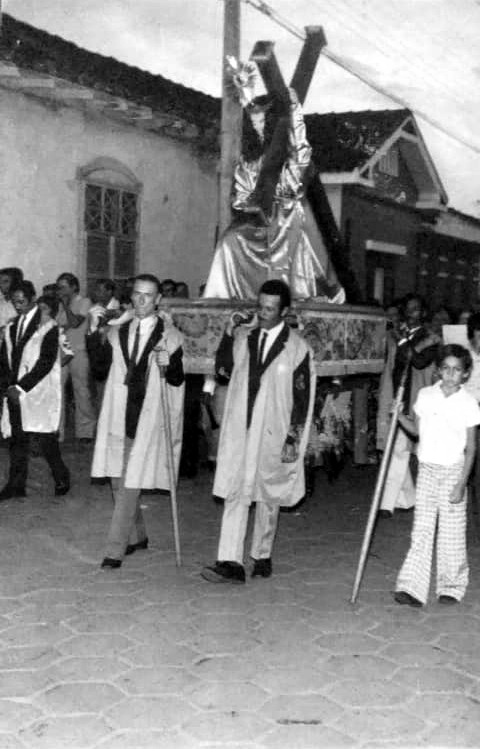
Our Lord of the Steps passing by on Direita Street on his way to the Gathering in the mid-1960s.

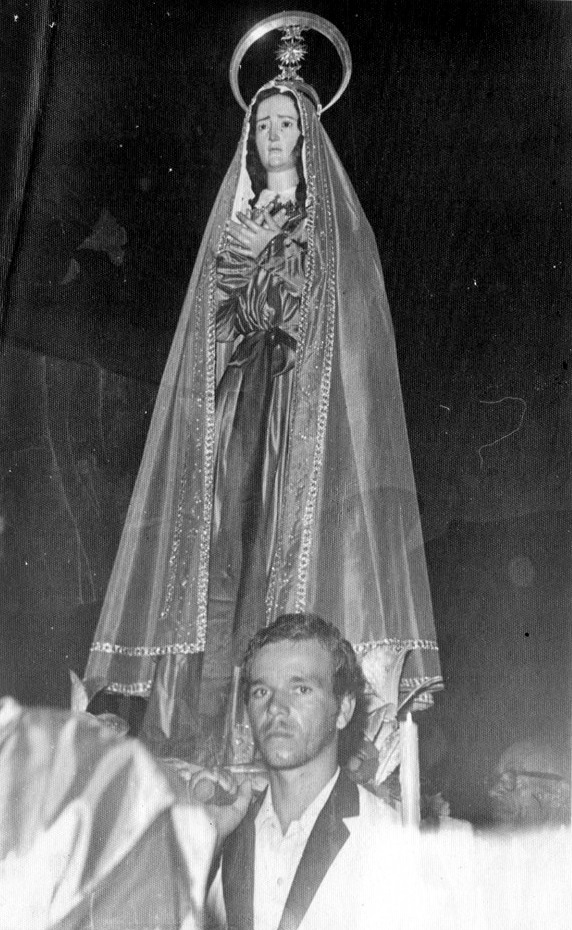
Our Lady of Sorrows on her way to the Gathering in mid-1960.

The religious traditions of the Week of Sorrows and the Feast of the Steps have been held during Lent since the 18th century by the local brotherhoods and confraternities, and with the extinction of these, the celebration was taken over by the Blessed Sacrament. Until mid 1940, on every Friday of Lent, there was a mass celebrated in the Church of Bonfim, where the choir and orchestra performed the Sorrows Motets attributed to Basílio Martins Braga Serradourada (1804-1874), as part of the celebrations of the Feast of the Steps. However, the festivities of the Steps were paralyzed between the penultimate and last Friday before the Holy Week for the Week of Sorrows, and in it, the celebration of the Septenary of Sorrows, which was a paraliturgy that, for seven days, commemorated the meditation of the seven sorrows of Mary. It was held at the altar of Saint Francis of Paola in the Mother Church, where the image of the Sorrows was placed, and was prayed over by the vicar, who exposed the Blessed Sacrament there for the recitation of prayers, and accompanied by the Choir and Orchestra that performed a repertoire in Latin and Portuguese, with compositions by composers from Goiás.

On Friday of Sorrows, before Palm Sunday, the Sorrows Procession takes place, and the image of Our Lady of Sorrows is carried in a large procession through traditional routes in the historical center: Direita Street, Nova Street, Mother Church Square, passing through the top of the plaza, going around it in part and returning to the Mother Church. At the departure of the procession, the choir, accompanied by the orchestra, performs the ejaculatory prayer Solo das Dores, attributed to José Iria Xavier Serradourada (1831-1898), from Goiás. During the course of the procession, choir and orchestra perform in ascending order the 06 Sorrows Motets: (No. 1) Virgo Virginum, (No. 2) - Ó Vós Omnes, (No. 3) - Factum Est, (No. 4) - Dilectus, (No. 5) - Quis Tibi, (No. 6) - Intenderunt Arcum in the so-called Passion Steps where prayers are said after the hymns. When the procession returns to the Mother Church, the Hymn of Sorrows is sung, concluding the procession and preparing the faithful for Mass.

On Saturday of the Steps, the day before Palm Sunday, the image of Our Lord of the Steps is carried in nocturnal procession by the Brotherhood of the Blessed Sacrament, from the Church of Our Lord of Bonfim, to the Church of Mount Carmel. Until mid-1940, the image stayed overnight at the Church of Our Lady of the Rosary of the Black People (now demolished). This parade is known as the Desterro Procession, where the image is gridded and covered with purple cloth, making it invisible. At the departure of the procession, the choir and orchestra performs the motet Pater mi (no. 1) in the churchyard, and during the route, sings the Miserere. In the churchyard of the Church of Mount Carmel, formerly inside the Church of the Rosary when the procession went there, the Senhor Deus and Vós Senhor are sung in Portuguese and alternated by the people. Several local personalities took turns annually as the feastmaster for this procession, and it was up to him to provide all the necessary apparatus as well as the ornamentation of the streets, which are decorated with lamps interspersed with tree branches and standing banana trees. On the sidewalks, not only the feastmasters, but also the residents of Aurora Street, scatter leaves and also basil and marjoram branches.

Execution of the Motet of the Steps in Pirenópolis during the Gathering Procession by the Choir and Orchestra Nossa Senhora do Rosário

On the evening of Palm Sunday, the Gathering Procession takes place within the celebrations of the Feast of the Steps, which consists of two parades that merge to form the Gathering. The Lord of the Steps Procession leaves the Church of Mount Carmel, accompanied only by men, the Brotherhood of the Blessed Sacrament, and religious authorities; women are only part of the choir. As it takes the public roads, the procession stops at the Passion Steps, where the Motets of the Steps are performed (No. 1) - Pater Mi, (No. 2) - Bajulans, (No. 3) - Exeamus, (No. 4) - Ó Vós Omnes - Encounter, (No. 5) - Anagariaverunt, (No. 6) - Filieae Jerusalem, (No. 7) - Domine Jesu, and (No. 8) - Popule Meus.

On Monday of Holy Week, the image of the Lord of the Steps, on the same lilac-covered and barred litter, was taken in procession at night to the Church of Our Lord of Bonfim, and finally placed back at its destination, where it had always been venerated. Upon arrival, the Pardon was sung.

==== Holy Week ====
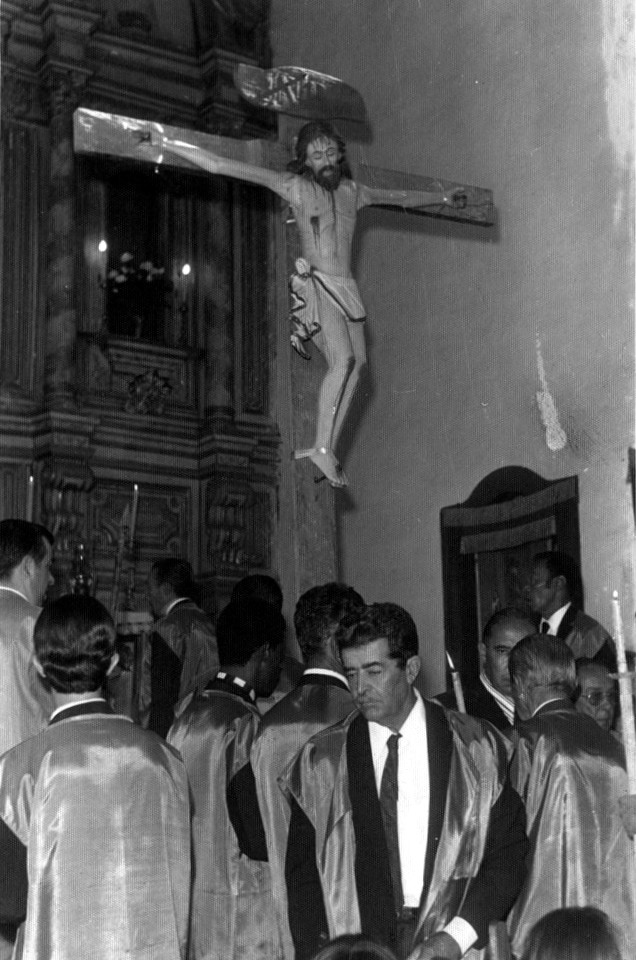
Celebration of the Lord's Passion in the mid-1960s.

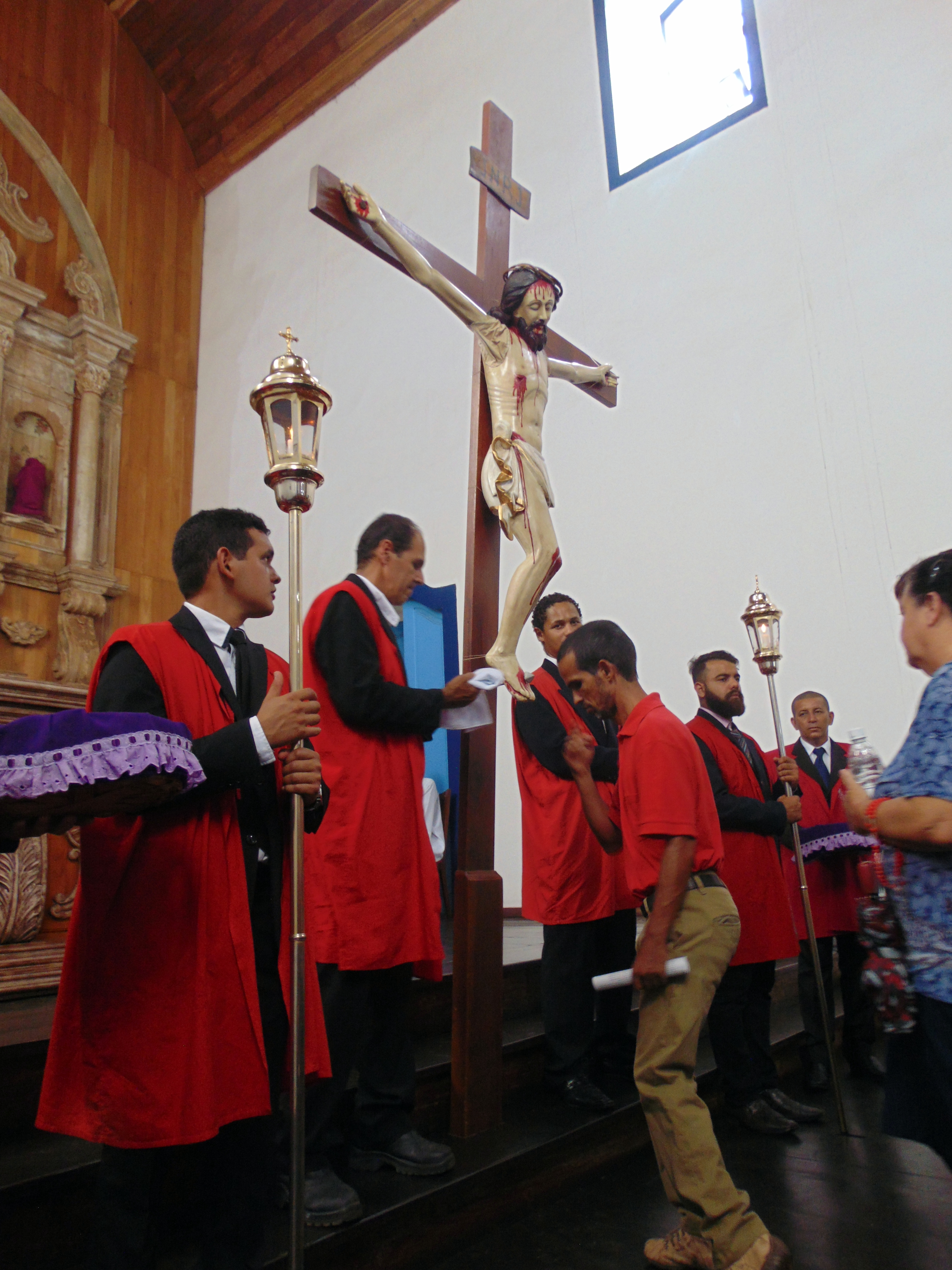
Celebration of the Lord's Passion on Good Friday in 2017. It is a local custom to use the life-size image of the Dead Lord from the 18th century.

In Pirenópolis, the manifestations of the religious traditions of Holy Week have been held since the 18th century, funded by brotherhoods, such as the Blessed Sacrament, and housed exclusively in parish churches. The rites of the celebration of the Passion of Christ, liturgical and paraliturgical acts, constitute an exceptional cultural moment, of emotional and affective value to the people of the place, and has been conceived since its origin and was the celebration of greatest local expression; it is the period when most celebrations were held.

On the morning of Palm Sunday is held the traditional Palm Procession. It is known that, until mid-1940, the procession was held in the Mother Church, where the priest, dressed in purple vestments appropriate for Mass, carried the cope. The faithful would take them home, devoutly keep them in their oratories, and burn them during storms, believing they would ward off the danger of lightning. Before Mass, there was a procession composed of only men, with a local music band, and that went around the perimeter of the Mother Church Square. The procession choir sang the Gloria Laus, answered from inside the church by another choir that sang the same composition with a variation in melody. Back in the Church, the procession found the main door of the temple closed. According to the ancient rite, a Brother of the Blessed Sacrament, wearing red opaque with the base of the large silver cross that opened the procession, knocked three times with it on the main door, which was then opened with the priest in front, courted by the other members of the Brotherhood, while the orchestra intoned the Pueri Hebræorum, following the sung Mass.

Nowadays, the celebration of the Palm Sunday, as well as the other celebrations, follow the rite promulgated by the Second Vatican Council, and begins at the windows of the Church of Our Lord of Bonfim. Upon arrival, the priest greets the people in the usual way, recites the prayers, and sprinkles the branches with holy water. The proclamation of the Gospel is made and then the procession is announced. At the beginning of the procession, immediately in front, goes the acolyte with the lighted thurible, and then, according to ancient local custom, the cruciferary, a Brother of the Blessed Sacrament with the ornamented cross; two Brothers leading the lanterns forming the wing of the faithful on the sides of the street in single line. In the center, the youth group of the Stations of the Cross Pastoral, followed by the guild of the Brotherhood of the Blessed Sacrament with the parish priest, accompanied by the Phoenix Band that performs the traditional dobrados and festive marches from its repertoire. When the priest arrives at the Mother Church, where the altar for the outdoor mass is located, he continues the celebration in the usual way, without the presence of the traditional choir and orchestra. On Palm Sunday evening and Holy Monday, the other celebrations of the Feast of the Steps take place.

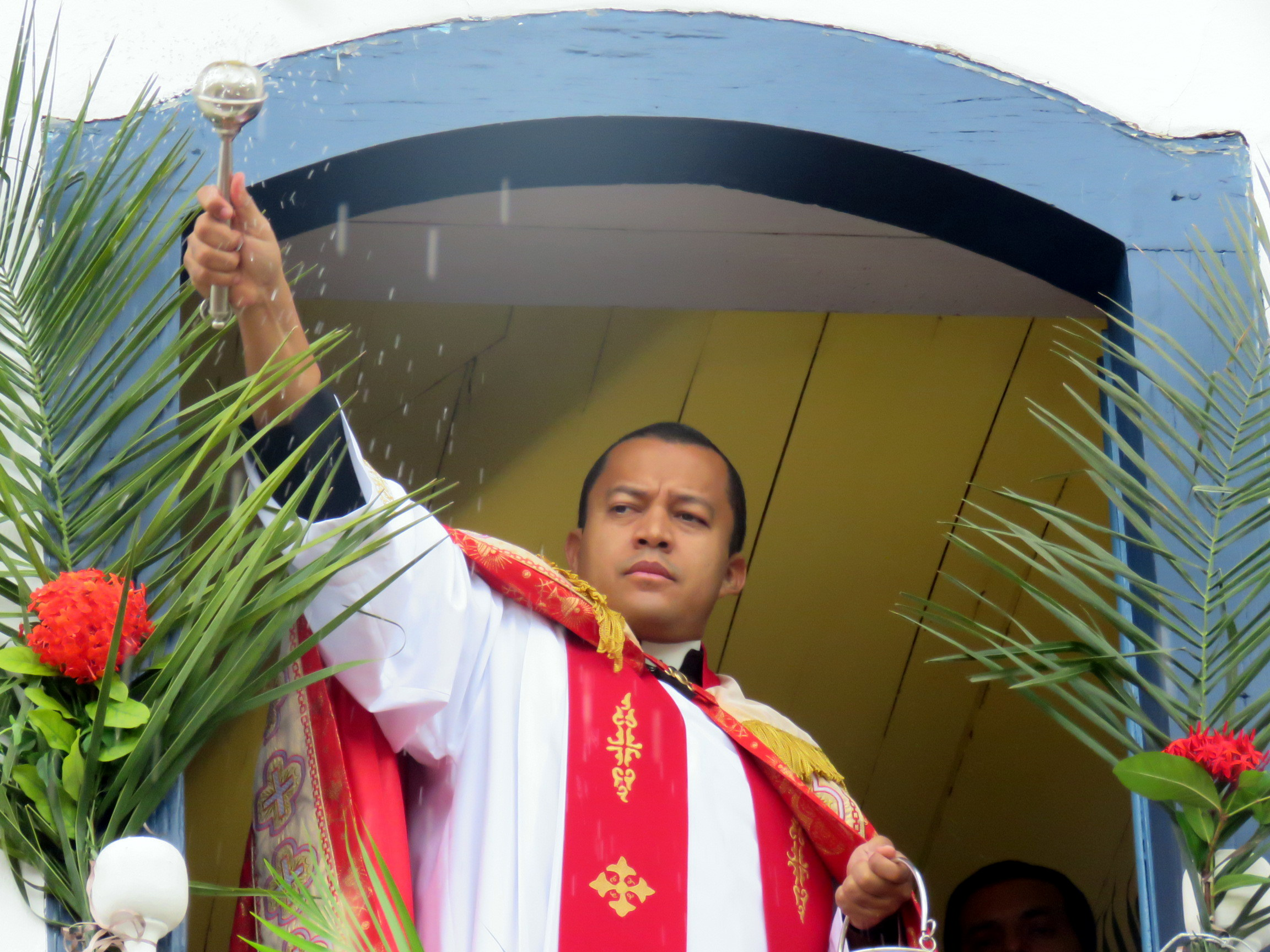
Priest blessing the branches from the window of the Church of Bonfim.

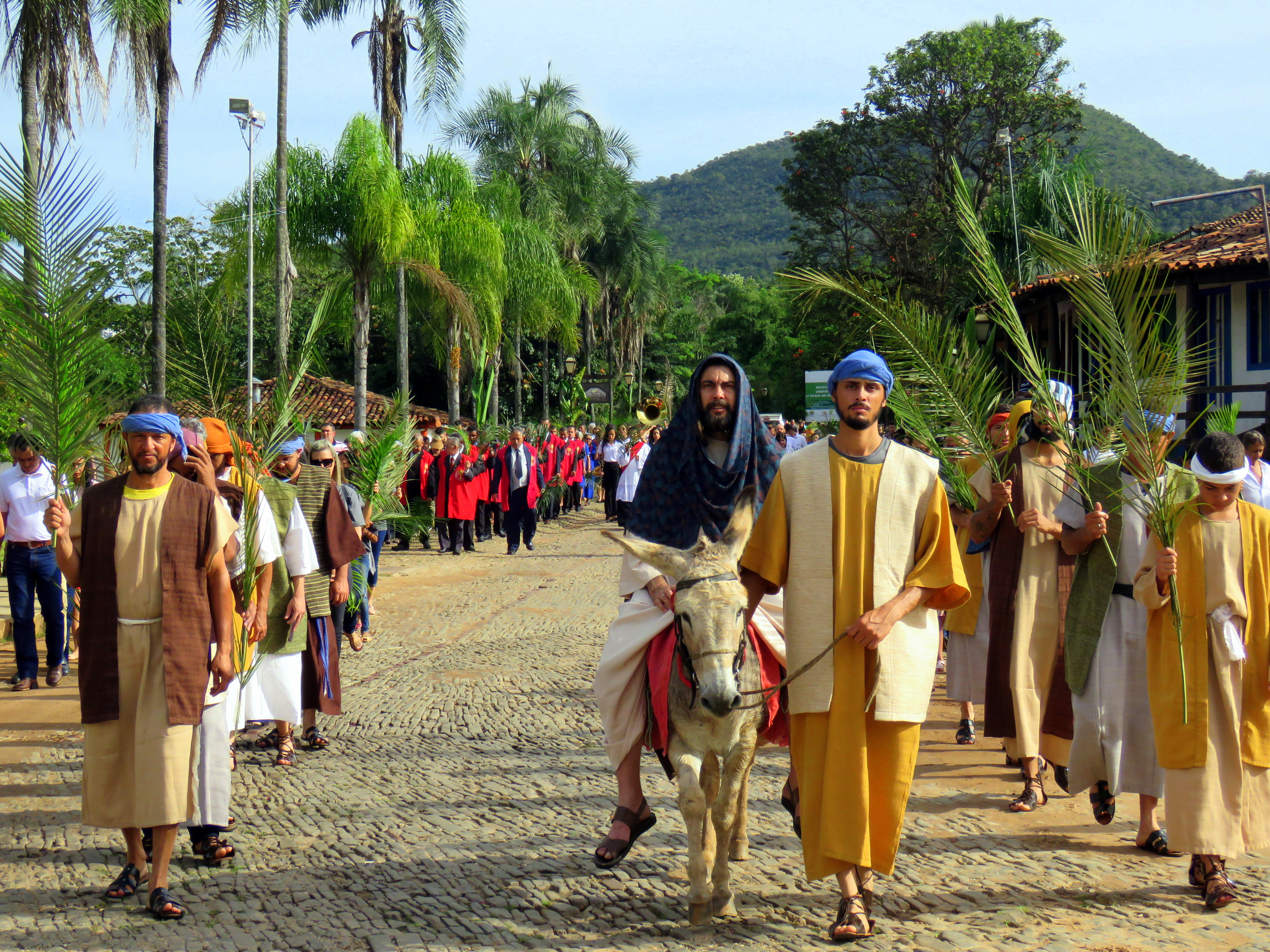
Members of the Stations of the Cross Pastoral Staging the Entry of Jesus into Jerusalem.

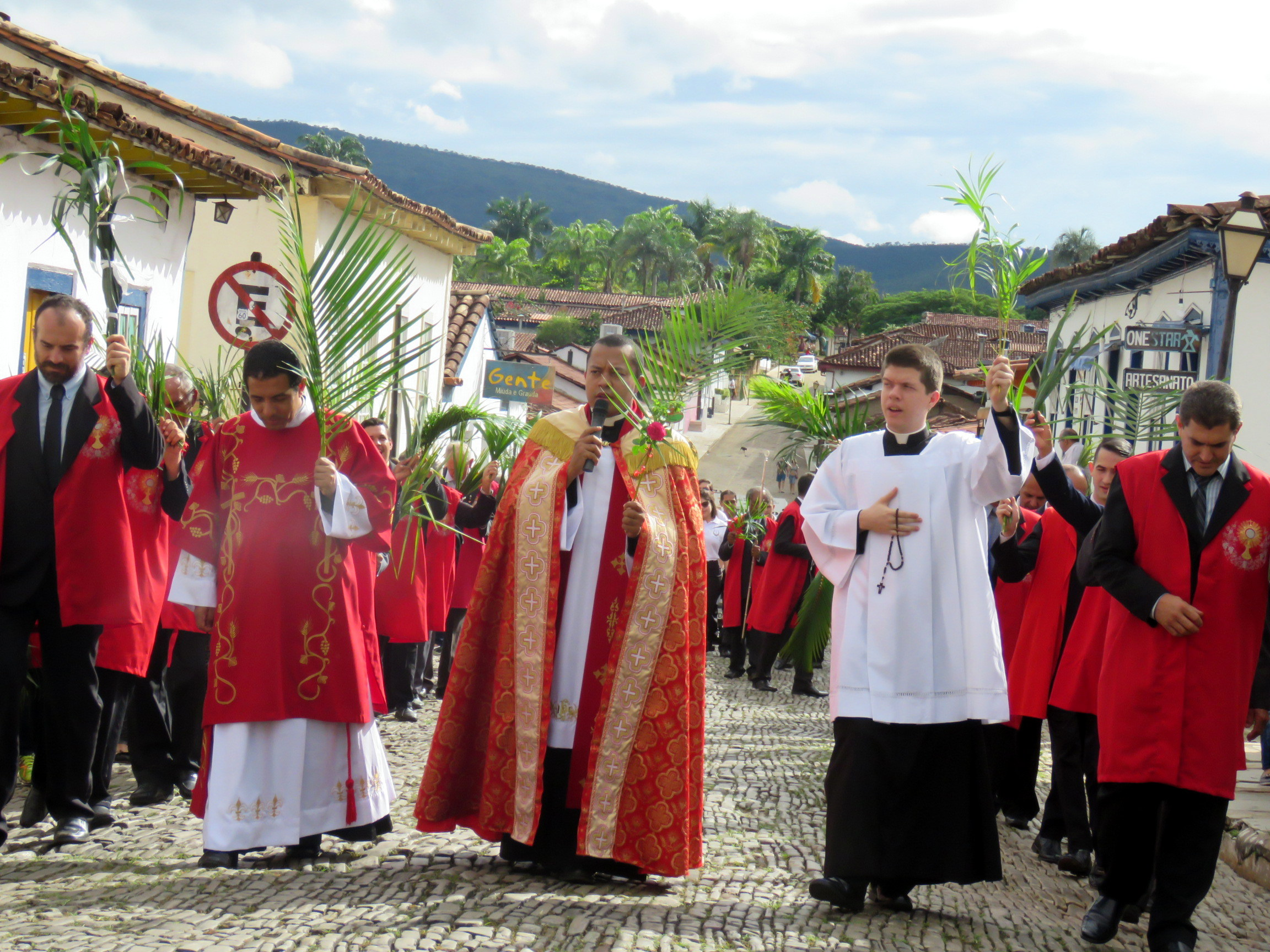
Inner procession of the Brotherrhood of the Blessed Sacrament with the pastor and the Phoenix Band.

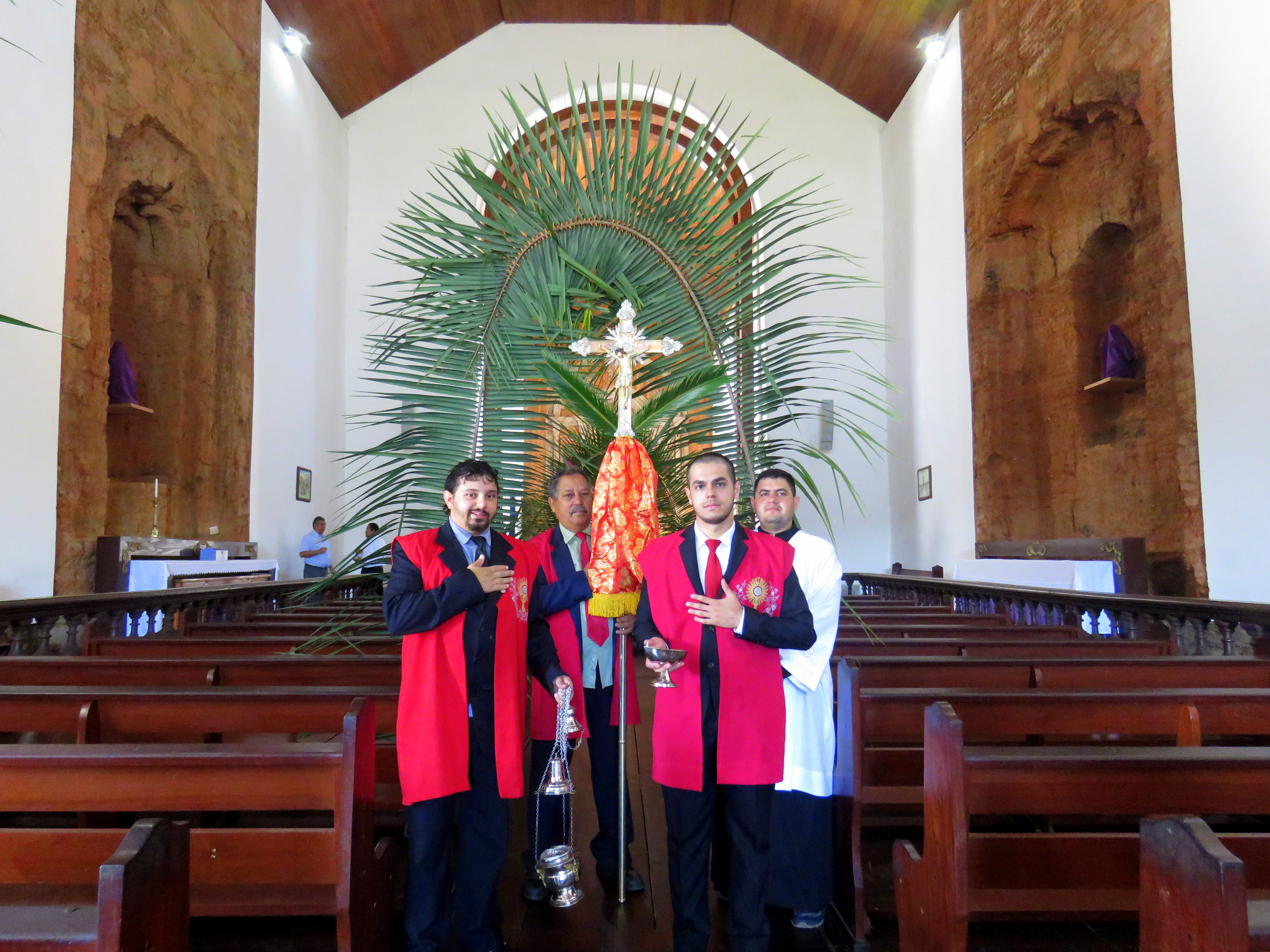
Palm Procession, exceptionally in the Mother Church without the faithful in 2020 in the COVID-19 pandemic.

On the evening of Holy Tuesday, there is a meditation on the seven last words of Christ on the cross, a custom introduced by Fr Augusto when he was parish priest in 2017. On Holy Wednesday, the evening mass is held in the Mother Church. Until mid-1940, Tuesday and Wednesday were days without ceremony, but dedicated to the preparation of the church for the next celebrations and the dismantling of the Calvary used in the Feast of the Steps.

At 9 o'clock in the morning on Maundy Thursday, the solemn mass In Coena Domini was celebrated in the Mother Church, according to the old custom before the liturgical reforms, sung by one of the city's orchestras that performed great pieces of national and international composers, in a true allusion to the baroque. At the hour of the glory, the bells were rung, and after the consecration, instead of the bell, as today, the rattle was used, whose shrill and loud sound echoed inside until the churchyard.

At dusk on Holy Thursday, the crowded church presided over the Foot Washing Ceremony, where the priest, wearing only the lava and the cincture on his cassock, and using the century-old silver basin and pitcher of the Brotherhood of the Blessed Sacrament, washed and kissed the feet of twelve boys, while the orchestra and choir performed Dómine Tu Mihi, specially composed for the Brotherhood of the Blessed Sacrament in 1899 by Antônio da Costa Nascimento, shortly after he had been the confraternity's provider. Also on that occasion, the orchestra played the mandatum for the celebrant to deliver the sermon.

At first, the adaptations of the liturgical reform of 1955 and 1962 were not very well received by the local community; with the principle of veritas horarium, the Missa In Coena Domini was transferred to the current time, in the evening, with the rite of foot washing within the celebration, suppressing the mandatum sermon. Currently, the ceremony includes the participation of the Choir and Orchestra Nossa Senhora do Rosário, which performs a mass from its repertoire, and the vigil with the Brotherhood guard, which remains until Good Friday. Since 2008, the Stations of the Cross Pastoral has staged the arrest of Christ in the churchyard of the church after the mass In Coena Domini.

On Good Friday at 9:00 a.m., the Passion ceremony began, now called the Solemn Liturgical Action, with the reading of the Passion Gospel sung and the choir and priest in black vestments, using the compositions of the tractus from the Choir's archive and proceeding with the adoration of the cross, using the image of the Dead Lord. Later, in the procession with the Blessed Sacrament, an urn used on Holy Thursday was brought in solemn procession to the main altar while the choir intoned the vexilla regis, and continued the ceremony of Adoration of the Cross, with its own ritual. At the end of the day, until nightfall, the population would wait for the Burial Procession.

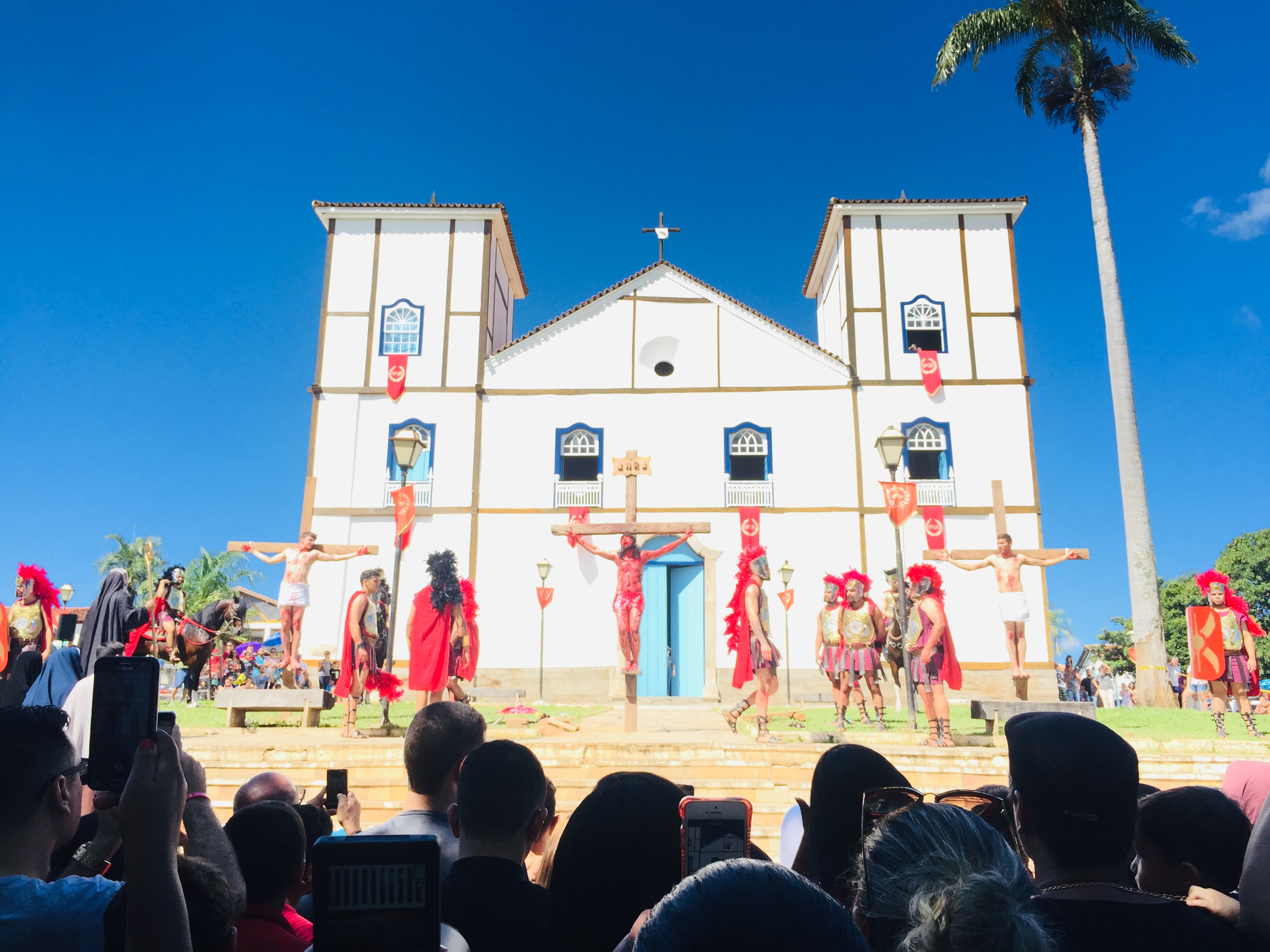
Staging of the Stations of the Cross.

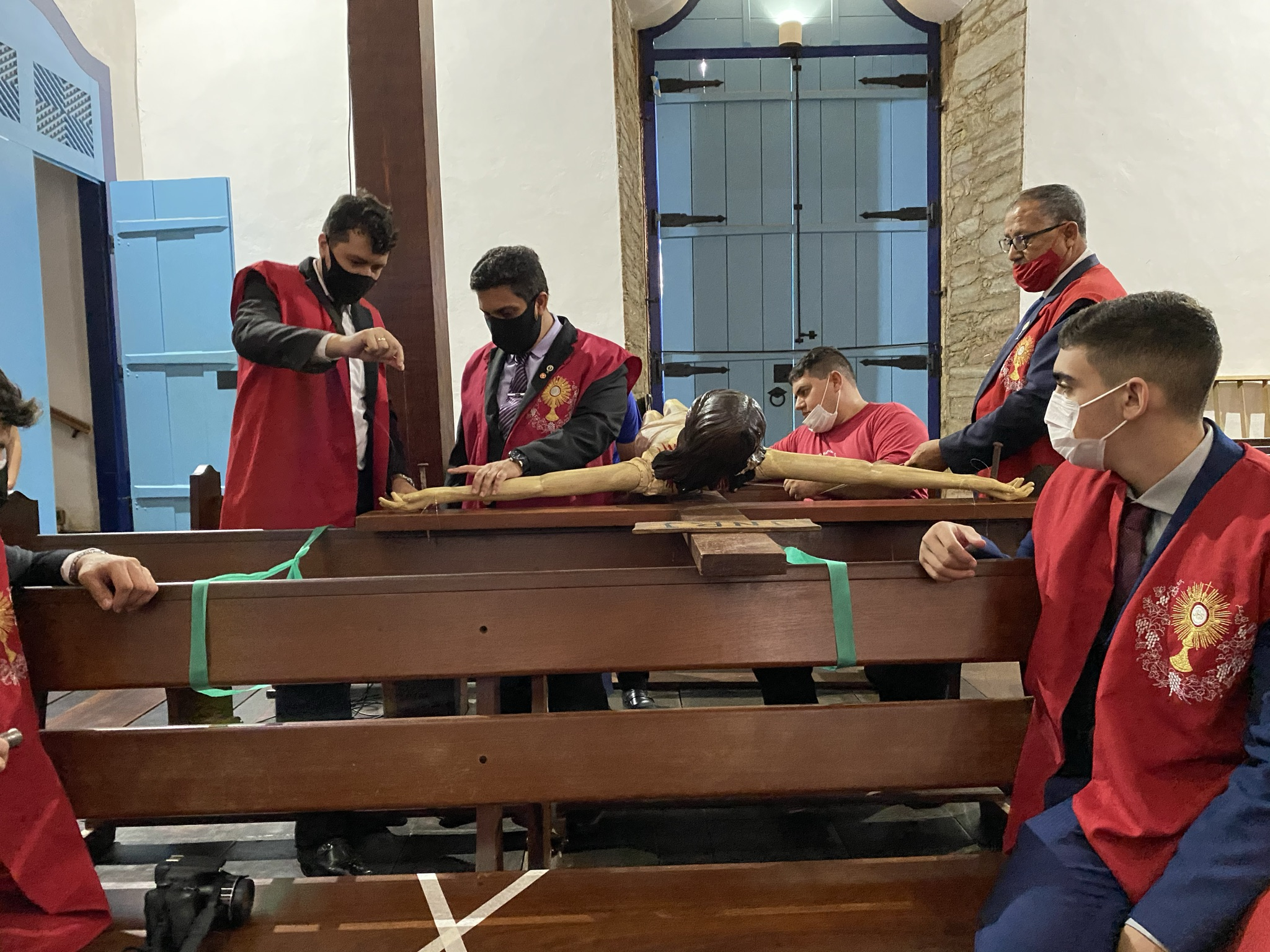
Brothers of the Blessed Sacrament preparing the image for adoration of the cross during the COVID-19 pandemic in 2021.

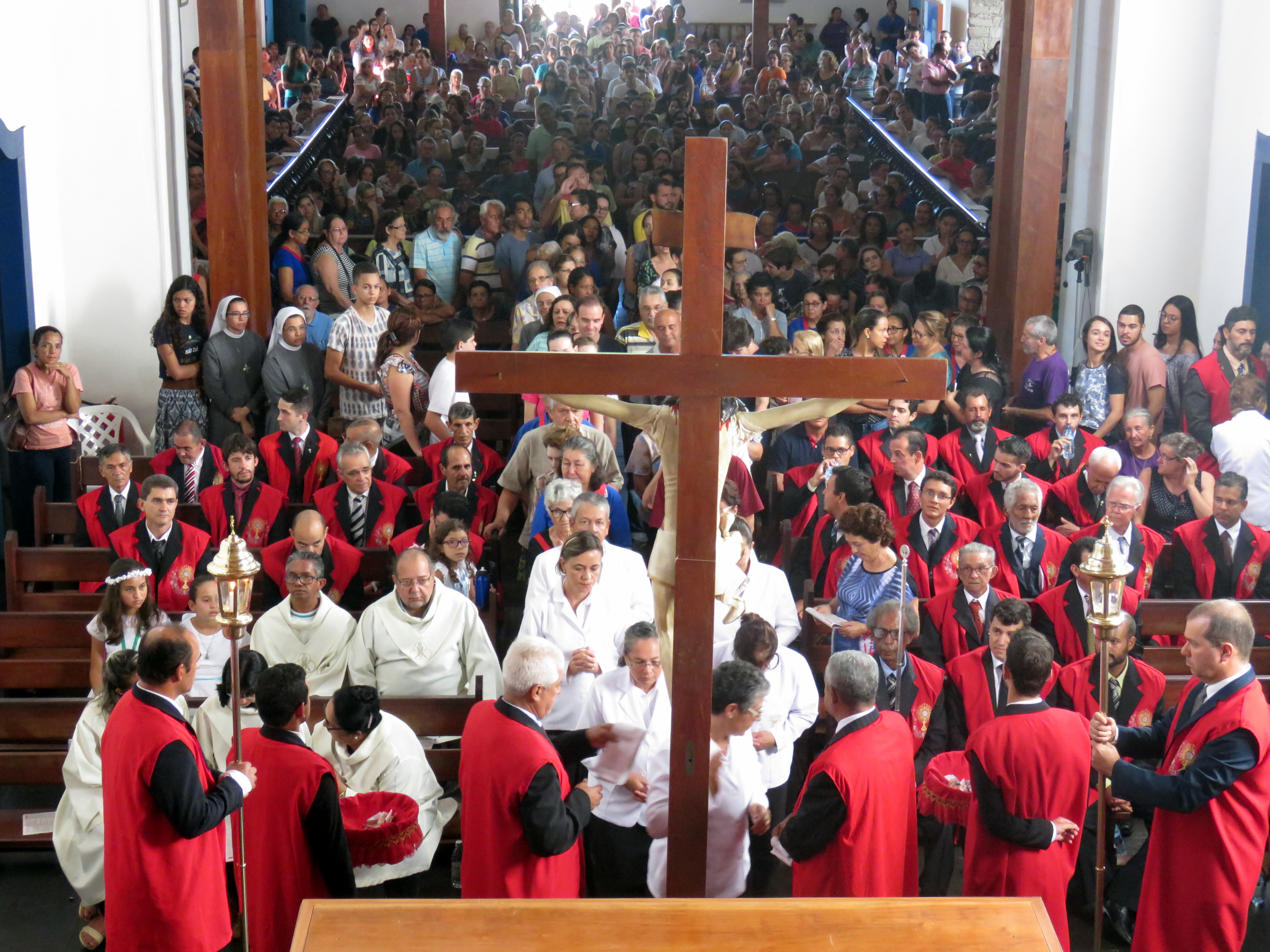
Solemn liturgical action.

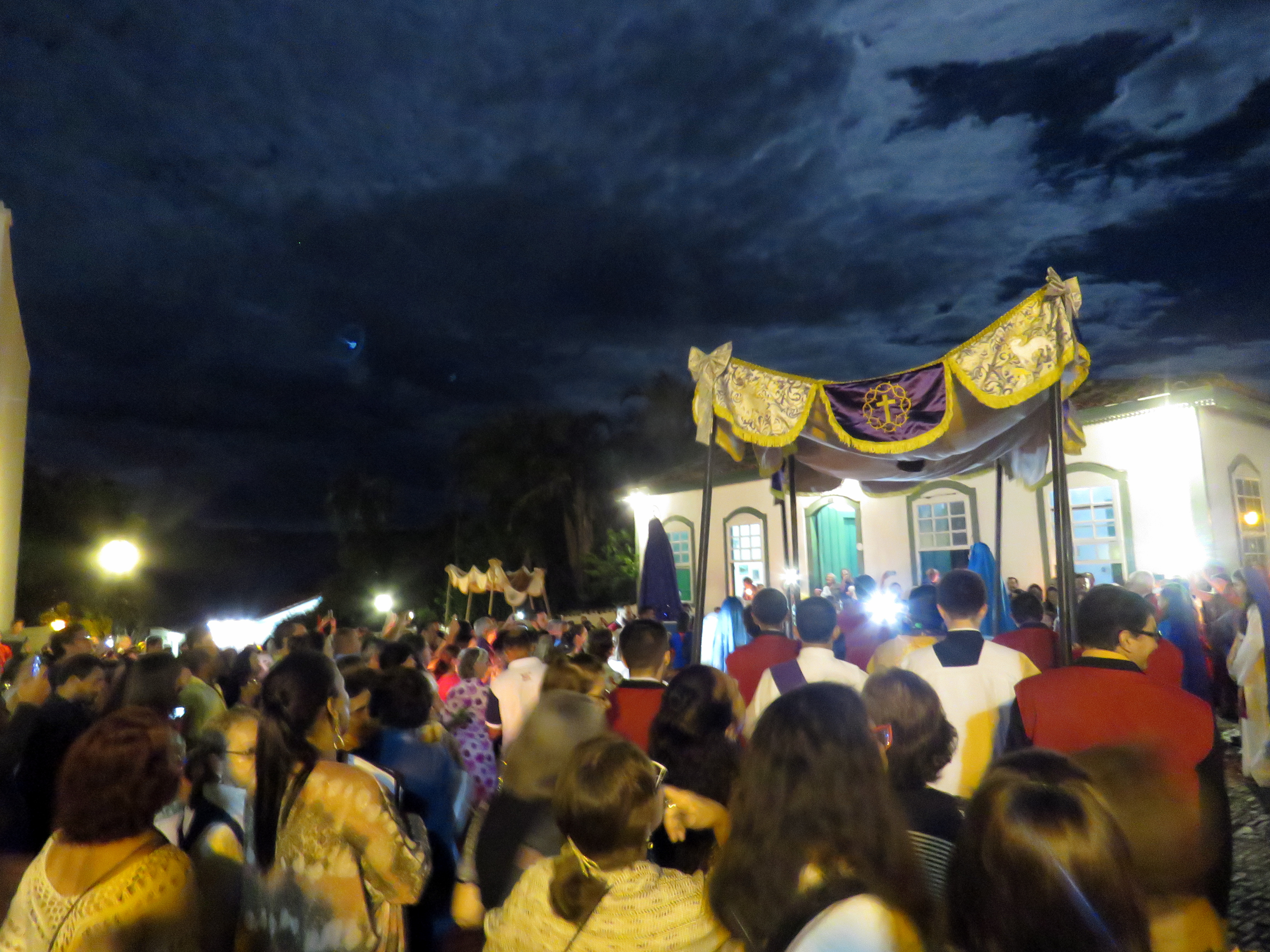
Burial procession through the streets of the historic center.

After the introduction of the liturgical reform and the current timetable, new customs have been introduced, such as the Stations of the Cross passing through the streets of the historic center in the morning with the image of the Lord of the Steps, suppressed by the staging promoted by young people since 2006, which today pleases residents and visitors. At 3 p.m., the solemn liturgical action takes place, using the image of the Dead Lord, but today without the presence of the choir and orchestra. At dusk, the burial procession proceeds, which, since the 18th century, parades through the streets of the historical center to the sound of funeral marches with the image used in the adoration of the cross, followed by the litter of Our Lady of Sorrows, dressed in dark purple, accompanied by the figure of the Veronica, followed by the choir, which intones the Heu and Pupilli a capella alternating with the funeral marches performed by the Phoenix Band.

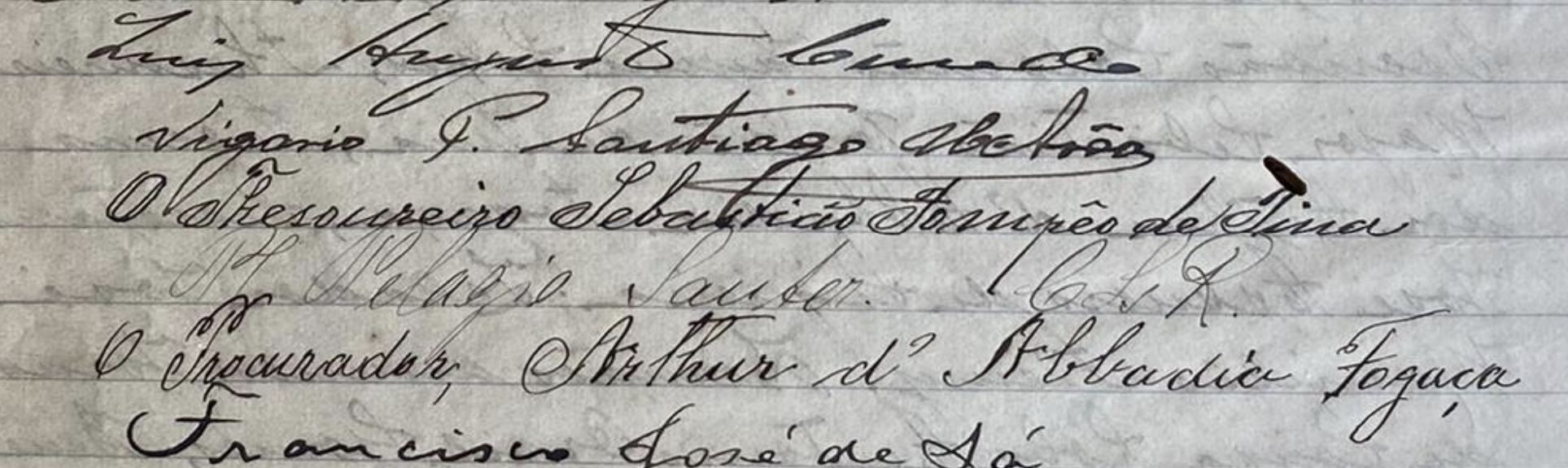
Father Pelágio Sauter's signature in the book of Minutes (1914-1940) of the Brotherhood of the Blessed Sacrament of Pirenópolis.

On Holy Saturday, before the reform, the solemn Easter Vigil was celebrated in the morning with a singing ceremony with choir and orchestra. After the celebration, the popular festival of the burning of the Judas took place, and at noon, the Folia do Divino, known as Folia dos Homens, now extinct, left the Church of Our Lady of the Rosary, accompanied by a crowd, brass band and a lot of fireworks, going through the historic center opening the Feast of the Divine, with the crown and the flag of the Divine passing from house to house, collecting alms for the cost of the feast.

At dusk, the traditional election of the board of the Brotherhood of the Blessed Sacrament was held, as it still is today. With the adoption of the liturgical reform, the solemn Easter Vigil is celebrated in the Mother Church at dusk, today without the presence of the Choir and Orchestra. After the celebration, the Resurrection Procession takes place, without the presence of the music band, which used to be held at dawn on Easter Sunday to the accompaniment of fireworks, bell peals with the band performing festive marches and doubados. This day began to be celebrated with a solemn sung Mass, in gratitude for the anniversary of the Brotherhood of the Blessed Sacrament, which in 2018 held the jubilee of 290 years of creation.

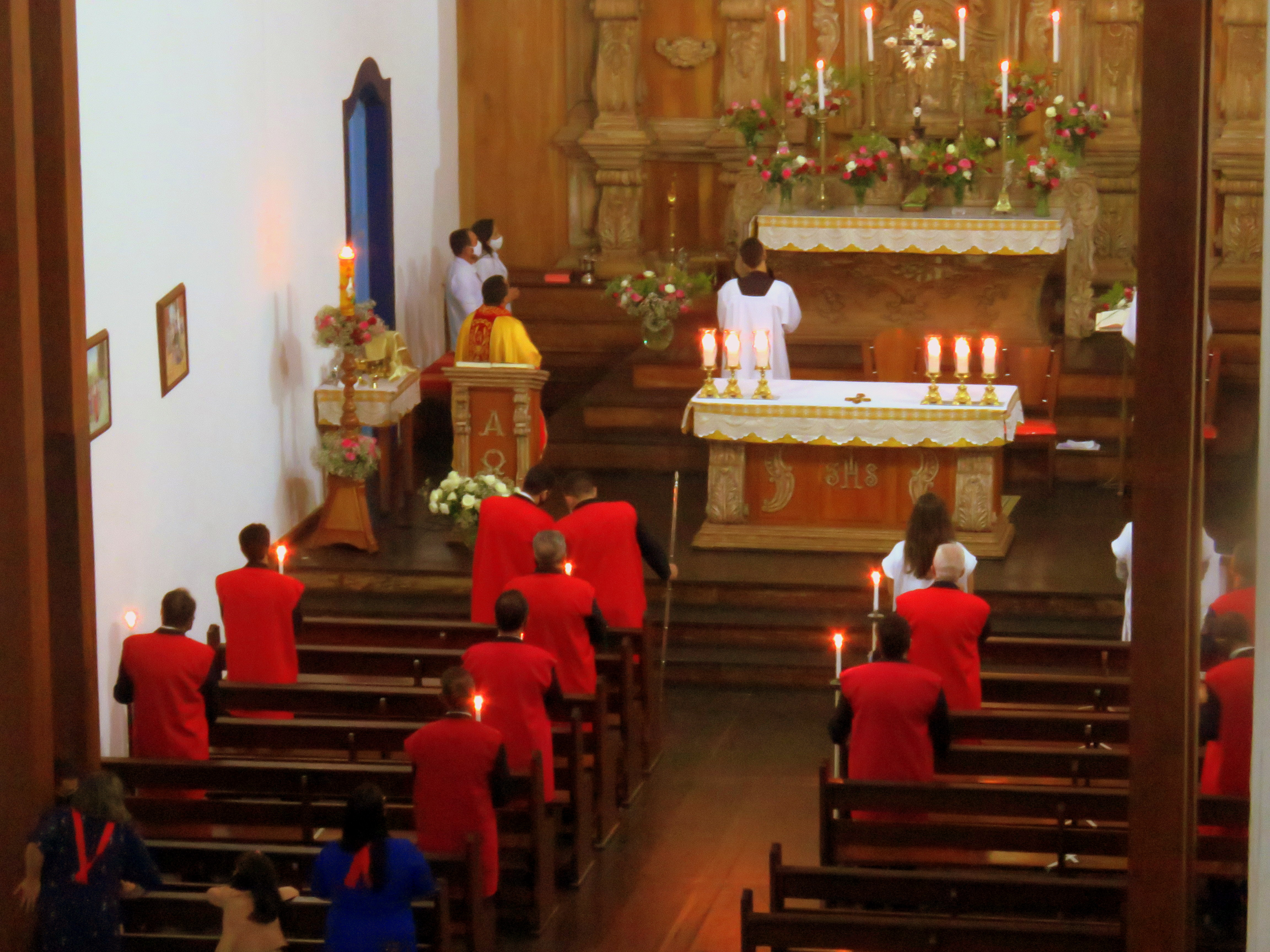
Easter Vigil in 2021, with pandemic restrictions.

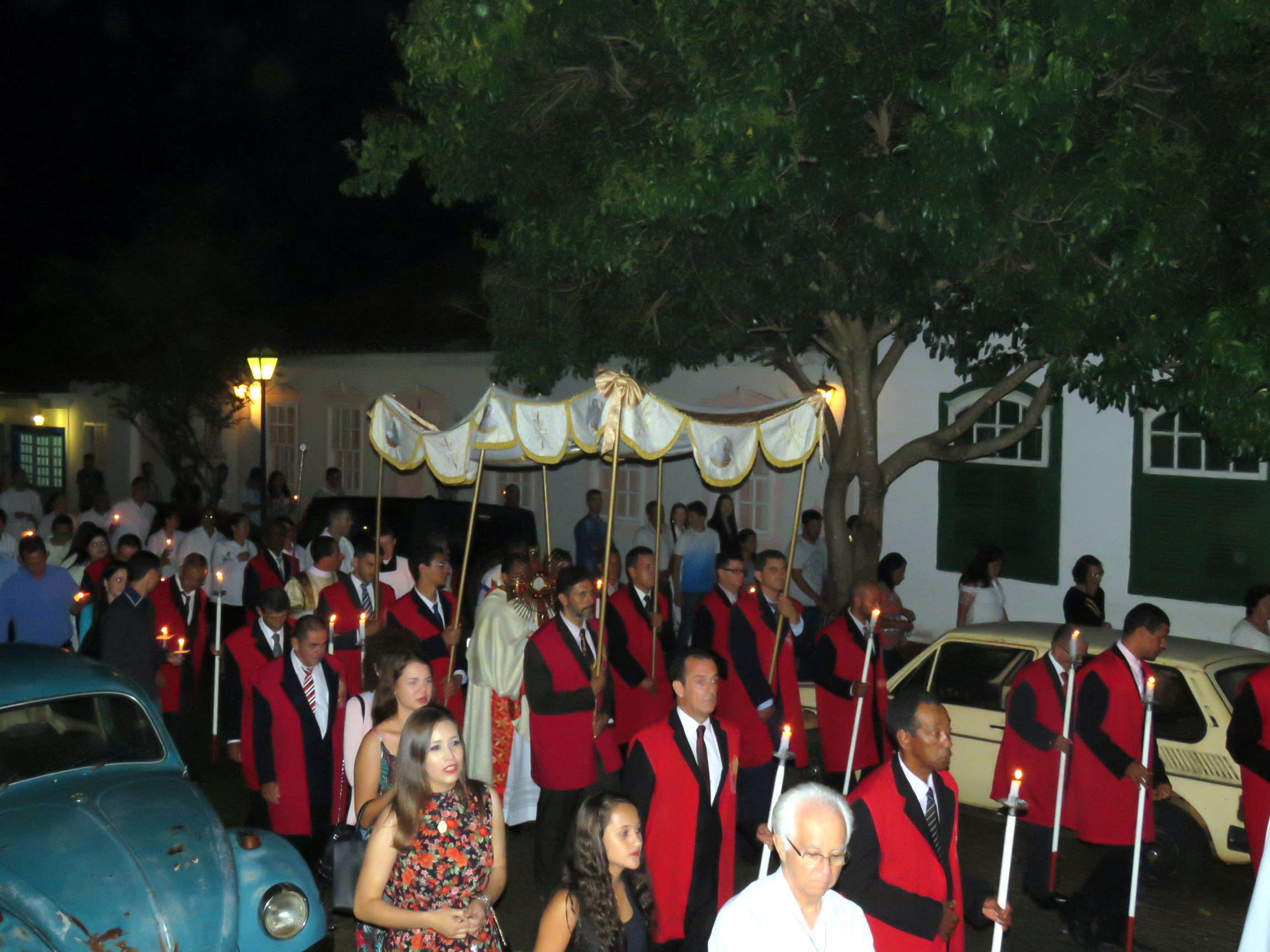
Resurrection Procession.

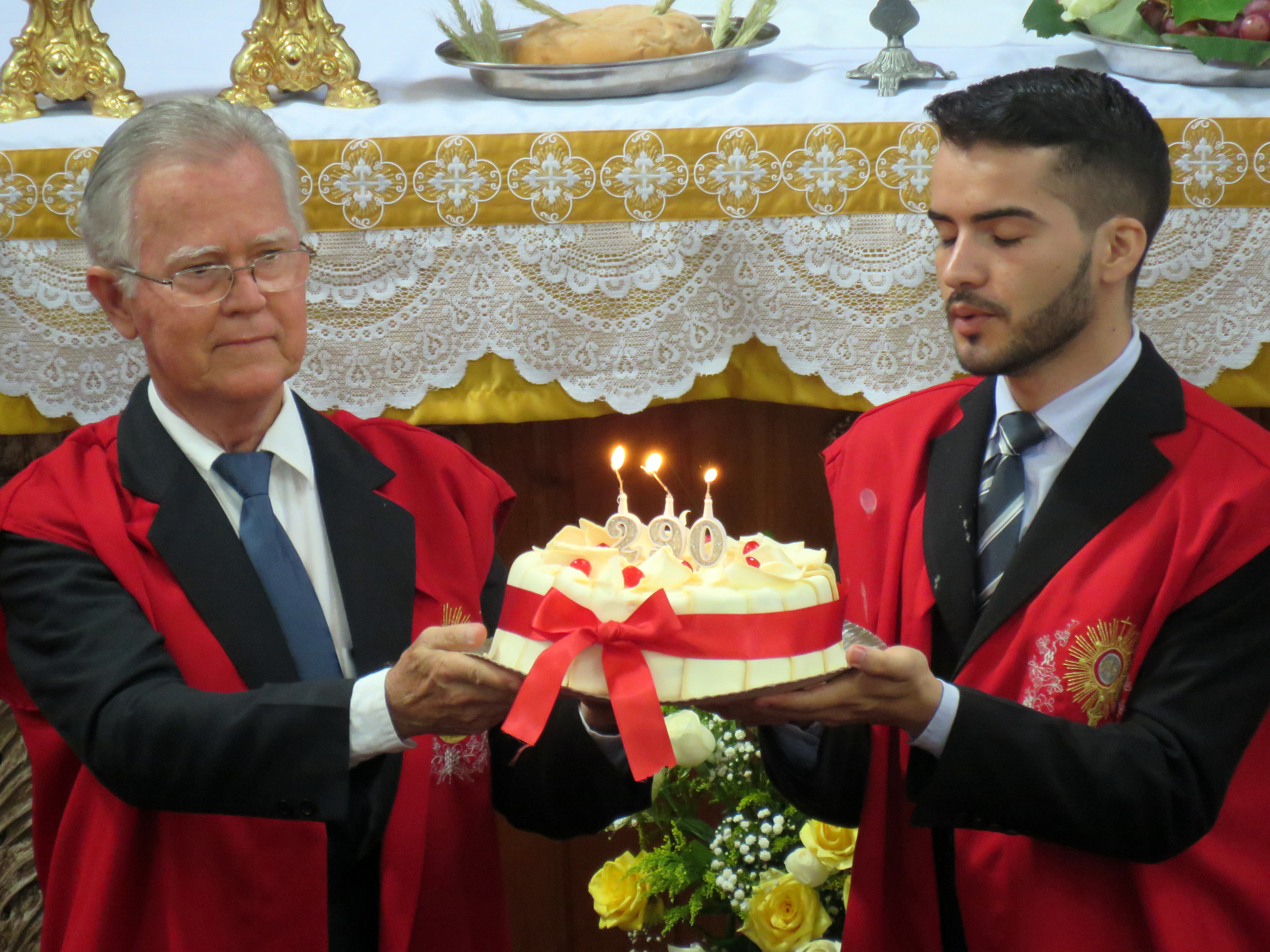
Brotherhood's 290th Anniversary Jubilee in 2018.

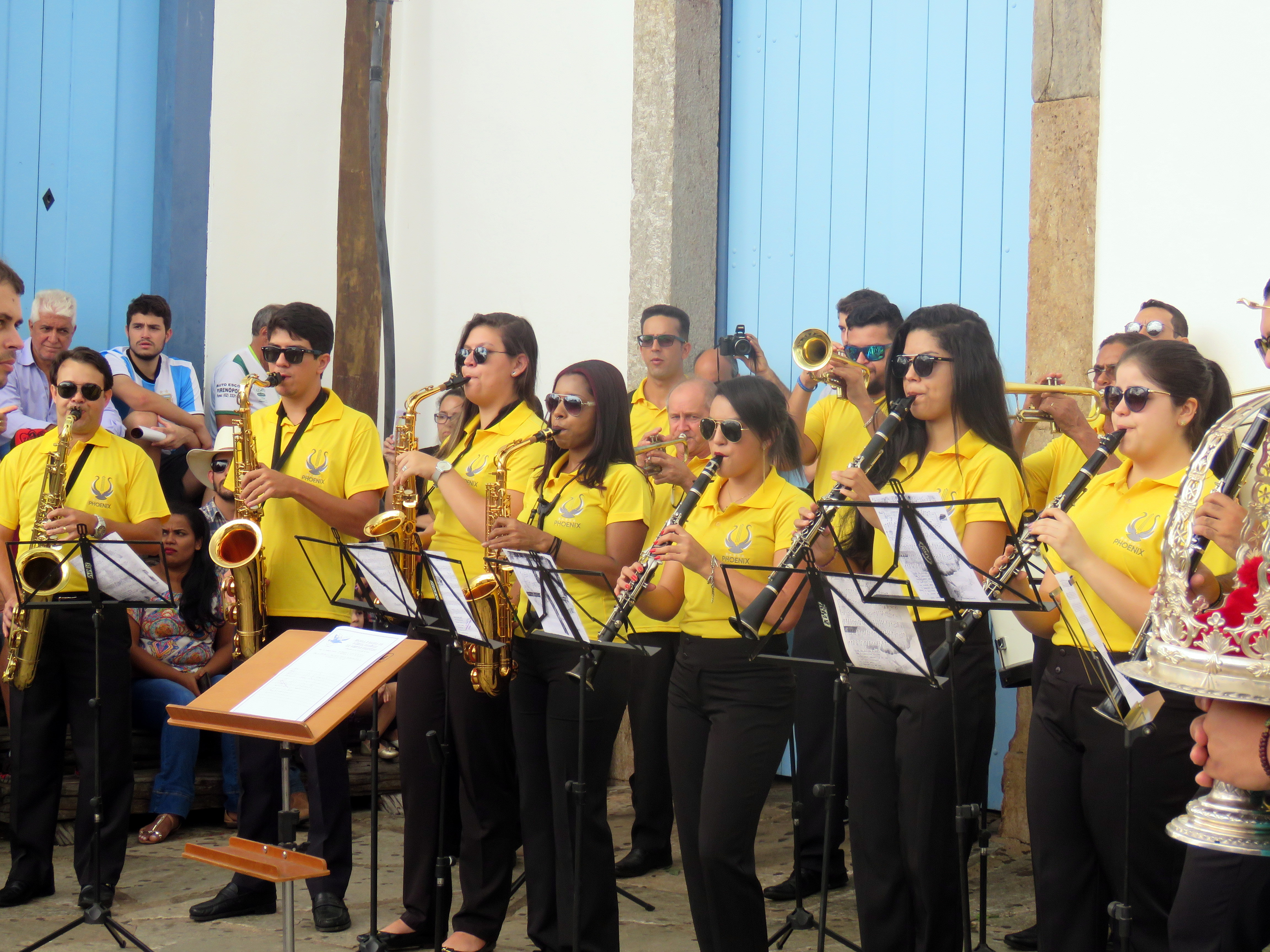
Departure of the Crown of the Divine.

At noon, there is the festive ringing of the bells of the Mother Church and a fireworks show with the exit of the crown of the Divine, formerly known as the Folia das Moças, with the same purpose as the men's folia; however, after the exit of the crown in the church, the band proceeds to the burning of the Judas. Another extinct ceremony on Easter Sunday was the Solemn Coronation with the singing of the Te Deum by the choir and orchestra, which ended Holy Week. Currently, the arrival of the crown of the Divine occurs in the last mass celebrated on this day, followed by a procession to the emperor's house for popular festivities.

==== Corpus Christi ====
Tantum Ergo Eugênio, by local composer Eugênio Leal da Costa Campos performed by the Choir and Orchestra Nossa Senhora do Rosário.

Since the first decades of the 18th century, when the Brotherhood of the Blessed Sacrament of the Mother of Rosary was created, the Corpus Christi is celebrated, and in the following centuries, was acquiring the current features, when the local community voluntarily added to the celebrations the tradition of the colorful carpets of sawdust, sand, seeds and flowers from the cerrado, that cover the secular stone streets in the Historical Center, especially Direita Street, the first road through which passes the procession of Corpus Christi, traditionally held always at dawn, before the solemn Mass, usually sung in Latin. In order for everything to be ready at dawn, the carpet is made by hundreds of volunteers between dusk on Wednesday, through the night and into the early morning hours before dawn on Thursday of Corpus Christi. The custom of the carpets were maintained even without the traditional procession in circumstances of the COVID-19 pandemic in 2020 and 2021, returning to the traditional procession in 2022. During the procession, it is an old custom to decorate altars for the adoration of the Blessed Sacrament; for a few moments, the group pauses and the hymn Tantum Ergo Sacramentum is sung, in Latin, composed in the beginning of the 20th century by Eugênio Leal da Costa Campos, and performed by the centenary Choir and Orchestra Nossa Senhora do Rosário. It is also on this day that the Emperor of the Divine receives the Crown of the Divine, beginning his reign for the Feast of the Divine of Pirenópolis the following year.

==== Feast of Mount Carmel ====
It is believed that the Feast of Our Lady of Mount Carmel, popularly known simply as the Feast of Mount Carmel, took place soon after the completion of the construction of the Church in 1754, which justifies the coming of the image of Our Lady of Mount Carmel, which Jarbas Jaime attributes to be of Portuguese origin. There are records in the archives of the Coro e Orquestra Nossa Senhora do Rosário of several musical compositions copied in the mid-1940s by the then conductor Sebastião Pompêo de Pina Jr, during the time of the Carmelite sisters, when the parish was under the leadership of the Franciscan priests. At this time, the Feast was boosted with the creation of the Confraternity of Mount Carmel, authorized in Rome by the Prior of the Order of Mount Carmelin 1947, a confraternity that today is non-existent. Through the Carmelite sisters, the popular Catholic custom of crowning images of Our Lady with children was promoted. After the Carmelite moved out and the end of the Nossa Senhora do Carmo School, the church was closed.

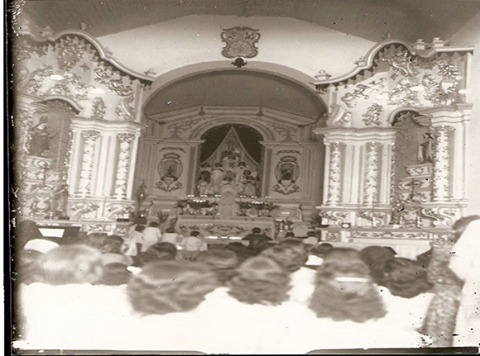
Feast of Mount Carmel in the mid-1950s.

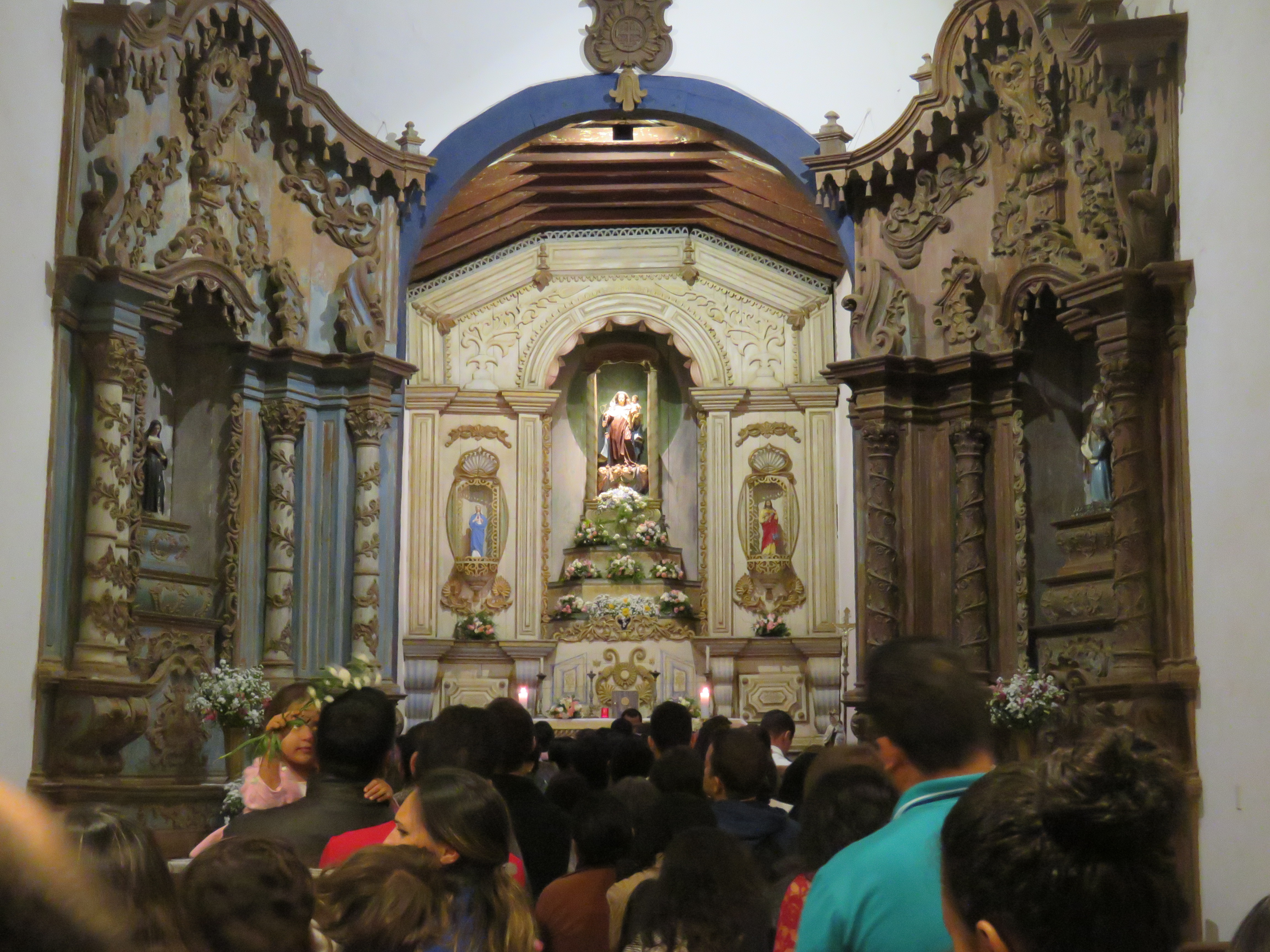
Feast of Mount Carmel in 2017.

In the mid 1990, the Novena of Mount Carmel was held in the Parish Hall, when the parish priest was Father Joel Alves Oliveira. Gradually, with the restoration of the Church of Mount Carmel and the return of the celebrations in the temple, on July 16, the Holy Mass was celebrated again. From 2014 to 2016 the Triduum was held. From 2017, with the consent of the parish priest, Father Augusto Gonçalves Pereira, the simple Novena was held again. In 2019, a group was assembled to sing the songs of the golden era of the Feast. In 2020, the Choir and Orchestra Nossa Senhora do Rosário returned to perform singing the solemn Holy Mass of July 16 in Latin, in a ceremony sine populo in the Church of Mount Carmel. In 2021, still with pandemic restrictions, Triduum was held in the Mother Church cum populo, with the presence on all days of the Choir of the Rosary and imposition of the scapular on the main day of the Feast.

== Parish priests ==
Number	Name	Image	Period	Vicars	
1	Father José de F. Vasconcelos (Diocesan Visitor - Intervenor)		1732-1733	Father Francisco Xavier de Oliveira	In 1732, the first baptism records appear in the Mother Church. From 1734 on, the obituary book of priests and brothers of the Blessed Sacrament appear in the church.
2	Father Francisco Xavier de Oliveira (First commissioned parish priest)		1733-1736	Father Antônio Borges Teixeira	
3	Father Pedro Monteiro de Araújo (First fixed parish priest)		1736-1741	Father Antônio Borges Teixeira	
4	Father Manuel Nunes Colares da Mota		1741-1747		In 1745, the Prelature of Goiás was created and the Rosary Parish was subordinated to it.
5	Father Gonçalo José da S. Guedes		1747-1749	Father Manuel Pereira de Sousa	
6	Father Jerônimo Moreira de Carvalho		1749-1754	Father Manuel Pereira de Sousa, Father Manuel da Silva Monteiro and Father João Pereira de Azevedo	
7	Father Custódio Barbosa de S. Miguel		1754-1759	Father Manuel Pereira de Sousa, Father Bernardo da Cunha Peixoto, Father Antônio Rodrigues Fontoura e Father Joaquim Gomes de Lima	
8	Father Luiz Manoel de M. Mascarenhas		1759-1766	Father Manuel Pereira de Sousa, Father José Cardoso Mariano, Father João Pires Ribeiro, Father José Pereira Camacho and Father Carlos Francisco Torres	
9	Father José Pires dos Santos		1766-1771	Father Manuel de Albuquerque, Father Francisco Xavier da Luz, Father Antônio Bueno da Veiga, Father Antônio Correia de Sant'Ana, Father José Caetano de Lobo and Father José Joaquim de Lima	
10	Father Manoel de Silva Contelo		1771-1773	Father Manuel Pereira de Sousa, Father Manuel Maia and Father Custódio Barbosa de S. Miguel	
11	Father Domingos Rodrigues de Carvalho		1774-1778	Father Carlos Francisco Torres, Manuel Pereira de Sousa, José Vieira de Magalhães, Fernando José Leal, Joaquim Gomes de Lima e Antônio Correia de Sant’Ana.	
12	Father Antônio Fernandes Barreto Valqueira		1778-1780	Father Carlos Francisco Tôrres e Manuel Ribeiro de Oliveira de Fontoura	
13	Canon José Correia Leitão		1780-1784	Father Bernardo Teles de Queiroz, Manuel Pinheiro de Oliveira, Joaquim Gomes de Lima, Manuel Pereira de Sousa e Francisco Xavier Guimarães.	
14	Father Bernardo Teles Queiroz		1784-1788		
15	Father Joaquim Gomes de Lima		1788-1790	Father Bernardo José Ferreira de Campos, Father Francisco Pinto Guedes, Father Antônio Coreia de Sant'Ana, Father Francisco Inácio de Faria Vivas and Father Custódio Barbosa de S. Miguel.	
16	Father Antônio Correia de Sant’Ana		1791-1795		
17	Father Vicente Ferreira Brandão		1795-1797		
18	Father Dr. José Caetano Ferreira de Aguiar		1797-1800		
19	Father Vicente Ferreira Brandão		1800-1803		
20	Father Conon Roque da Silva Moreira		1803-1805	Father Joaquim Gonçalves Dias Goulão.	
21	Father José Gomes de Lima		1805-1807	Father Francisco Pinto Guedes, Father Antônio Luiz de Amorim and Father Luiz Manuel dos Santos.	
22	Father Joaquim Gonçalves Dias Goulão		1807-1810	Father Antônio Rodrigues Santiago	
23	Father Francisco Xavier dos Guimarães Brito e Costa		1810-1816	Father Manuel Amâncio da Luz, Father Dr. Luiz Manoel dos Santos, Father Jerônimo José de Campos, Father Francisco Pinto Guedes e Father Francisco Inácio de Farias Vivas.	
24	Father Joaquim Gonçalves Dias Goulão		1816-1822	Father Luiz Gonzaga de Camargo Fleury, Father Bento Francisco de Paula and Father Manuel Pereira de Sousa (2nd of his name)	
25	Father Francisco José da Silva Sortes		1822-1824		
26	Father Joaquim Gonçalves Dias Goulão		1824-1840	Father Silvestre Alves da Silva, Father Manuel Amâncio da Luz and Father Manuel Pereira de Sousa	In 1826, the Prelature of Goiás was elevated to a Diocese
27	Father Manuel Amâncio da Luz		1840-1842		
28	Father Luiz Manoel de Guimarães		1842-1844	Father Manuel Amâncio da Luz and Father Luiz Manuel de Guimarães.	
29	Father José Joaquim do Nascimento		1844-1898	Father Marcelino Teixeira Chaves, Father Antônio dos Santos Mendonça, Father Francisco Inácio da Luz and Father Antônio Justino.	
30	Father Francisco Xavier da Silva		1898-1899	Father João Keerondir and Father Roberto Hansmaier (both Redemptorists)	
31	Father João Marques de Oliveira		1899-1900		
32	Father Francisco Xavier Savelli		1900-1902	Father Francisco da Cunha Peixoto Leal.	
33	Father Carlos José Bohrer		1902-1909		
34	Monsignor Bruno Alberdi Zugadi		1909-1917		
35	Father Santiago de Uchôa		1917-1936	Father Pelágio Sauter, Father Samuel Galbusara, Father Antonio Colbachinni and Father José Quintiliano Leopoldo e Silva.	In 1932, the Diocese of Goiás was elevated to Archdiocese. In 1941, the Mother Church was declared a Historical Heritage by IPHAN.
36	Monsignor Domingos Pinto de Figueiredo		1936-1937		
37	Father Santiago de Uchôa		1937-1941	Father José Trindade	
38	Friar Cipriano Bassler, Order of Friars Minor		1941-1944	Fr. João A. Jousou and Fr. André Antonio Quina (Order of Friars Minor)	
39	Friar Filipe Antonio Kennedy, Order of Friars Minor		1944-1950	Fr. André Antonio Quina, Fr. Anselmo Donvel, Fr. João B. Vianney Krieg, Fr. Saturnino (Order of Friars Minor)	
40	Friar Artur Gregorio, Order of Friars Minor		1950-1952		
41	Friar João Antonio Jousou, Order of Friars Minor		1952-1956		
42	Nelson Rafael Fleury		1956-1957		In 1956, the Archdiocese of Goiânia was created, and the Rosary Parish was subordinated to it.
43	Friar Filipe Antonio Kennedy, Order of Friars Minor		1957-1959	Fr. André Antonio Quina, Fr. Anselmo Donvel, Fr. João B. Vianney Krieg, Fr. Saturnino (Order of Friars Minor)	
44	Friar Primo Carrara, Order of Saint Augustine		1959-1967		In 1966, the Diocese of Anápolis was created, and the Rosary Parish was subordinated to it.
45	Father Francisco de Assis		1967-1968		
46	Father Joaquim Xavier de Lima		1968-1969		
47	Father Sebastião		1968-1969		
48	Conon Tennyson de Oliveira		1969-1979		
49	Father Vitório, Order of Friars Minor		1980-1981		
50	Father Primo Carrara		1982-1993		
51	Father Joel Alves de Oliveira		1993-1999	Father Primo Carrara	
52	Father Luiz Virtuoso		1999-2006		On September 5, 2002, the fire at the Mother Church of Pirenópolis occurred.
53	Father Oscar de Vasconcelos de Souza Filho		2006-2008	Father Joel Alves de Oliveira, Father Wôlnei Ferreira de Aquino, Father Anevair José da Silva and Father Éder Martins Pereira.	On March 30, 2006, the reinauguration of the Mother Church of Pirenópolis took place.
54	Father Anevair José da Silva		2009-2015	Father Joaquim Oliveira Neto, Father Paulo Assiol Alves Bittencourt, Father Antônio Carlos Pereira Vieira, Father Minta José Vellamattathil, Father Danilo Malta dos Santos, Father Carlito Bernardes Júnior and Father Wellison Borges de Lima.	In 2010, the Feast of the Divine was registered as a Cultural Heritage Site by IPHAN.
55	Father Augusto Gonçalves Pereira		2015-now	Father Paulo Assiol Alves Bittencourt, Father Wellington Gonçalves Pereira and Father Adair Cândido Correa	In 2019, the Brotherhood of the Blessed Sacrament, as well as the celebrations initiated by it, were declared cultural heritage of the municipality.

== See also ==
- Roman Catholic Diocese of Anápolis
- Roman Catholic Archdiocese of Goiânia
