= Birinci =

Birinci may refer to:

== Places ==
- Birinci Ağalı, a village in the Zangilan Rayon in Azerbaijan
- Birinci Alıbəyli, a village in the municipality of Alıbəyli in the Agdam District of Azerbaijan
- Birinci Aral, a village and municipality in the Agdash Rayon of Azerbaijan
- Birinci Aşıqlı, village and municipality in the Beylagan Rayon of Azerbaijan
- Birinci Baharlı, a village in the municipality of Üçoğlan in the Agdam District of Azerbaijan
- Birinci Biləcik,a village and municipality in the Shaki Rayon of Azerbaijan
- Birinci Çağan, a village in the Shamakhi Rayon of Azerbaijan
- Birinci Çaylı, a village and municipality in the Shamakhi Rayon of Azerbaijan
- Birinci Dördyol, a village in the municipality of Təzəkənd in the Agdam District of Azerbaijan
- Birinci İpək, a village in the Lachin District of Azerbaijan
- Birinci Mahmudlu, a village and municipality in the Fuzuli District
- Birinci Mayak, a village and municipality in the Neftchala Rayon of Azerbaijan
- Birinci Meyniman, a village and municipality in the Hajigabul Rayon of Azerbaijan
- Birinci Milli, a village in the Kalbajar District of Azerbaijan
- Birinci Nügədi, a village and municipality in the Quba Rayon of Azerbaijan
- Birinci Əlicanlı, a village and municipality in the Zardab Rayon of Azerbaijan
- Birinci Ərəbcəbirli, village in the Goychay Rayon
- Birinci Paşalı, a village in the Hajigabul Rayon of Azerbaijan
- Birinci Qaradəmirçi, a village and municipality in the Barda Rayon
- Birinci Qaralı, a village in the Neftchala District
- Birinci Quzanlı, a village in the municipality of Guzanly in the Aghdam District of Azerbaijan
- Birinci Şahsevən, a village municipality in the Beylagan Rayon of Azerbaijan
- Birinci Səmədxanlı, a village and municipality in the Masally Rayon of Azerbaijan
- Birinci Şıxlı, village and municipality in the Qazakh Rayon of Azerbaijan
- Birinci Şordəhnə, a village in the Agdash Rayon of Azerbaijan
- Birinci Tığik, a village in the Lachin District of Azerbaijan
- Birinci Udullu, a village and municipality in the Hajigabul District of Azerbaijan
- Birinci Varlı, a village and municipality in the Salyan Rayon of Azerbaijan
- Birinci Yeniyol, a village and municipality in the Ismailli Rayon of Azerbaijan
- Birinci Yuzbasili, a village in the Agdam District of Azerbaijan

== People ==
- Çağlar Birinci (born 1985), Turkish former footballer
- Yakup Kadri Birinci (born 1967), Turkish alpine skier
