= Cəngan =

Cəngan may refer to:

- Cəngan, Jalilabad, Azerbaijan
- Cəngan, Neftchala, Azerbaijan
- Cəngan, Sabirabad, Azerbaijan
- Cəngan, Salyan, Azerbaijan
- Dzhangyan, Azerbaijan
