= Mahmudlu =

Mahmudlu or Makhmudly or Makhmudlu may refer to the following places in Azerbaijan:

- Mahmudlu, Jabrayil
- Mahmudlu, Qubadli
- Mahmudlu, Shamkir
- Birinci Mahmudlu
- İkinci Mahmudlu
- Üçüncü Mahmudlu

== See also ==
- Mahmutlu (disambiguation)
