= Şıxlı =

Shikhly or Şıxlı may refer to:

- Birinci Şıxlı, Azerbaijan
- İkinci Şıxlı, Azerbaijan
- Şıxlı, Agdash, Azerbaijan
- Şıxlı, Fizuli, Azerbaijan
- Şıxlı, Goychay, Azerbaijan
