= IPEC =

IPEC can refer to:

- Indian Point Energy Center
- International Programme on the Elimination of Child Labour
- Institute of Permaculture and Ecovillage of the Cerrado, Brazil
- Inteligência em Pesquisa e Consultoria Estratégica, a Brazilian opinion polling company
- Intellectual Property Enterprise Court, a venue for legal actions relating to Intellectual Property in the United Kingdom
- International Pharmaceutical Excipients Council
- International Symposium on Parameterized and Exact Computation, an annual computer science conference
- Toll Ipec, an Australian logistics enterprise, subsidiary of Toll Group

== See also ==
- Ipek (disambiguation)
