= Aşıqlı, Beylagan =

Aşıqlı, Beylagan or Ashykhly may refer to:

- Birinci Aşıqlı, Azerbaijan
- İkinci Aşıqlı, Azerbaijan
