= Dördyol =

Dördyol may refer to:

- Birinci Dördyol, Azerbaijan
- İkinci Dördyol, Azerbaijan
