= İpək =

İpək may refer to:

- Birinci İpək, Azerbaijan
- İkinci İpək, Azerbaijan

== See also ==
- Ipek (disambiguation)
