= Qaradəmirçi =

- Municipality
- Location within Azerbaijan Location within Karabakh Economic Region
- Coordinates: 40°14′07″N 47°13′21″E
- Country: Azerbaijan
- Rayon: Barda

Population
  - Total: 456
- Time zone: UTC+4 (AZT)
  - Summer (DST): UTC+5 (AZT)

Qaradəmirçi (also, Karadamirchi and Karademirchi) is a village and municipality in the Barda Rayon of Azerbaijan. It has a population of 456.

== See also ==
- Birinci Qaradəmirçi
- İkinci Qaradəmirçi
