= Şordəhnə =

Coordinates: 40°37′N 47°32′E

- Municipality
- Location within Azerbaijan
- Country: Azerbaijan
- Rayon: Agdash

Population
  - Total: 669
- Time zone: UTC+4 (AZT)
  - Summer (DST): UTC+5 (AZT)

Şordəhnə (also known as Shordekhna or Shordekhne) is a village and municipality in the Agdash Rayon of Azerbaijan. It has a population of 957.

== See also ==
- Birinci Şordəhnə
- İkinci Şordəhnə
