= Səmədxanlı =

Səmədxanlı may refer to:

- Birinci Səmədxanlı, Azerbaijan
- İkinci Səmədxanlı, Azerbaijan
