= Ərəbqardaşbəyli =

Ərəbqardaşbəyli or Arabkardashbeyli may refer to:

- Ərəbqardaşbəyli, Neftchala, Azerbaijan
- Ərəbqardaşbəyli, Salyan, Azerbaijan
