= Üçüncü =

Üçüncü is a Turkish surname. Notable people with the surname include:

- Bülent Üçüncü, Turkish footballer
- Hasan Üçüncü, Turkish footballer

== See also ==
- Üçüncü Ağalı
- Üçüncü Beynəlmiləl
- Üçüncü Mahmudlu
