= Ipek =

Ipek or İpek may refer to:

== People ==
- İpek (given name)
- Ipek Duben (born 1941), Turkish artist
- Assiya İpek (born 1993), Turkish women's weightlifter
- Emrah Ipek (born 1971), Turkish singer and actor
- Hasan İpek (born 1959), Turkish bureaucrat
- Ozan İpek (born 1986), Turkish professional footballer
- Ipek Ersanli (born 2004), Turkish Businesswoman

== Places ==
- İpek, the Turkish name of Peja, a city in Kosovo
- Birinci İpək, also called Ipec-1, in Azerbaijan
- İkinci İpək, also called Ipec-2, in Azerbaijan
- Sanjak of İpek, an administrative division of the Ottoman Empire

== Other uses ==
- League of İpek, an Albanian political organization established in 1899
- İpek University, a former university in Ankara, Turkey

== See also ==
- IPEC (disambiguation)
- İpək (disambiguation)
