= Tığık =

Tığık or Tığıq or Tigik or Tygik may refer to:

- Birincı Tığık, Azerbaijan
- İkinci Tığık, Azerbaijan
