= Varlı =

- Location within Azerbaijan
- Coordinates: 39°48′47″N 49°05′16″E
- Country: Azerbaijan
- Rayon: Salyan
- Time zone: UTC+4 (AZT)
  - Summer (DST): UTC+5 (AZT)

Varlı is a village in the Salyan Rayon of Azerbaijan.

== See also ==
- Birinci Varlı
- İkinci Varlı
