= Əlicanlı, Zardab =

Əlicanlı, Zardab or Alidzhanly, Zardab or Alydzhanly may refer to:

- Birinci Əlicanlı, Azerbaijan
- İkinci Əlicanlı, Azerbaijan
