= Boranıkənd =

- Municipality
- Location within Azerbaijan
- Coordinates: 39°25′59″N 48°49′48″E
- Country: Azerbaijan
- Rayon: Salyan

Population
  - Total: 2,208
- Time zone: UTC+4 (AZT)
  - Summer (DST): UTC+5 (AZT)

Boranıkənd (also, Boranykend) is a village and municipality in the Salyan Rayon of Azerbaijan. It has a population of 2,208.
