= Tutabag =

Aşağı Kürkend
- Location within Azerbaijan
- Coordinates: 39°37′N 48°58′E
- Country: Azerbaijan
- Rayon: Salyan
- Time zone: UTC+4 (AZT)
  - Summer (DST): UTC+5 (AZT)

Aşağı Kürkend (also, Salyanstroy) is a village in the Salyan Rayon of Azerbaijan.
