= Varli =

Varli may refer to:

- Varli people, an ethnic community of Maharashtra and Gujarat, India
  - Varli language, the Indo-Aryan language spoken by the Warli people
  - Warli painting, an Indian painting style associated with the people
- Worli, a locality in Mumbai, India
- Varlı, a village in Azerbaijan
- Muharrem Varlı (born 1969), Turkish politician
