= Abadkənd =

- Municipality
- Location within Azerbaijan
- Coordinates: 39°45′N 49°01′E
- Country: Azerbaijan
- Rayon: Salyan

Population
  - Total: 2,680
- Time zone: UTC+4 (AZT)
  - Summer (DST): UTC+5 (AZT)

Abadkənd (also, Abadkend and Dzhindyrly) is a village and municipality in the Salyan Rayon of Azerbaijan. It has a population of 2,680.
