= Aşağı Kürkəndi =

Coordinates: 39°37′N 48°58′E

Aşağı Kürkəndi is a village and municipality that is located in the Salyan Rayon of Azerbaijan. It last recorded a population of 1,314.
