= Pambıqkənd =

- Municipality
- Location within Azerbaijan
- Coordinates: 39°49′59″N 48°54′51″E
- Country: Azerbaijan
- Rayon: Salyan

Population
  - Total: 1,981
- Time zone: UTC+4 (AZT)
  - Summer (DST): UTC+5 (AZT)

Pambıqkənd is a village and municipality in the Salyan Rayon of Azerbaijan. It has a population of 1,981. The municipality consists of the villages of Pambıqkənd and Bəşirbəyli.
