= Postal codes in Azerbaijan =

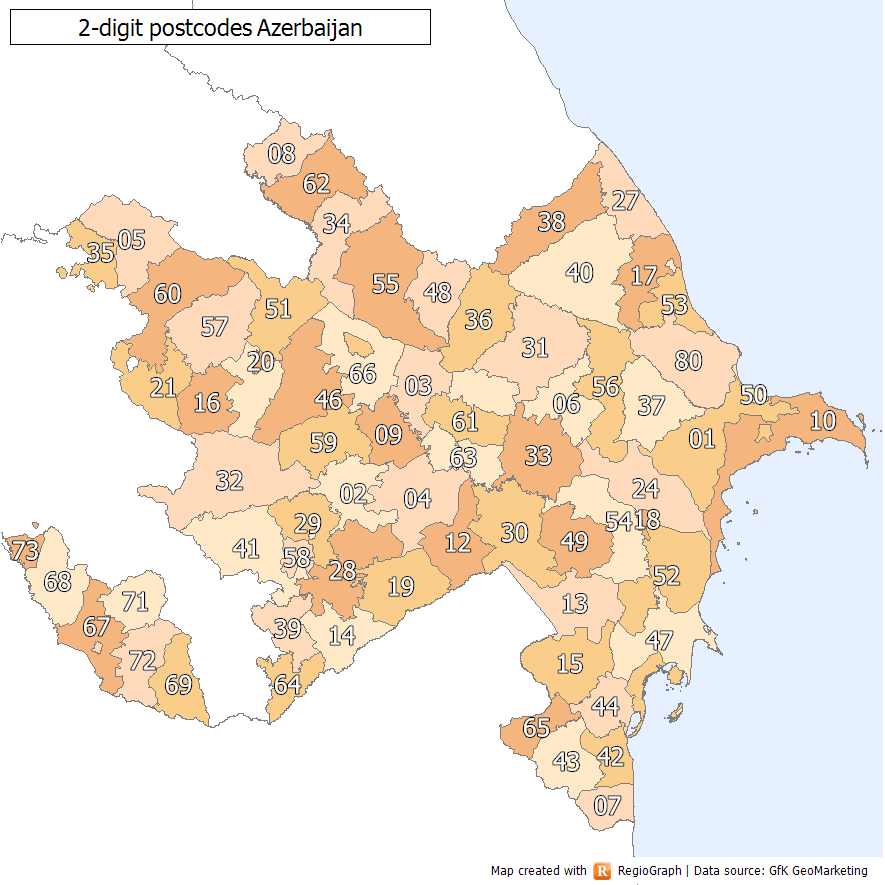
2-digit postcode areas Azerbaijan (defined through the first two postcode digits)

Postal codes in Azerbaijan consist of four digits.

The four-digit postcode indicates the nationwide format AZ NNNN. The first two digits indicate the regions of Azerbaijan in accordance with the modern administrative divisions, including the Nakhchivan Autonomous Republic the postal codes are technically out of use and there is no the delivery of mail conducted between Nagorno-Karabakh and the rest of Azerbaijan.

== History ==
From 1970 until 1991, when Azerbaijan was part of the Soviet Union as the Azerbaijan SSR, the entire territory of the Soviet Union used the six-digit postcode 37NNNN. After gaining independence, Azerbaijan switched to the current four-digit postcode.

== See also ==
- Postal code
- Azərpoçt
- Telephone numbers in Azerbaijan
- ISO 3166-2:AZ
- Administrative divisions of Azerbaijan
- Postage stamps and postal history of Azerbaijan
