= Yeni Uluxanlı =

- Municipality
- Location within Azerbaijan
- Coordinates: 39°47′57″N 49°00′41″E
- Country: Azerbaijan
- Rayon: Salyan

Population (2008)
  - Total: 1,060
- Time zone: UTC+4 (AZT)
  - Summer (DST): UTC+5 (AZT)

Yeni Uluxanlı (until 2008, Aydıngün) is a village and municipality in the Salyan Rayon of Azerbaijan. It has a population of 1,060.

== Notable natives ==
- Nazim Babayev — National Hero of Azerbaijan.
