= Marışlı =

- Municipality
- Location within Azerbaijan
- Coordinates: 39°33′44″N 48°55′10″E
- Country: Azerbaijan
- Rayon: Salyan

Population
  - Total: 2,050
- Time zone: UTC+4 (AZT)
  - Summer (DST): UTC+5 (AZT)

Marışlı (also, Maryshly) is a village and municipality in the Salyan Rayon of Azerbaijan. It has a population of 2,049.
