= Qardili =

Coordinates: 39°41′N 49°01′E

Qardili is a village and municipality in the Salyan Rayon of Azerbaijan. It has a population of 1,263.
