= Xurşud =

- Municipality
- Location within Azerbaijan
- Coordinates: 39°37′48″N 48°54′37″E
- Country: Azerbaijan
- Rayon: Salyan

Population
  - Total: 708
- Time zone: UTC+4 (AZT)
  - Summer (DST): UTC+5 (AZT)

Xurşud (also, Khurshud and Khurshut) is a village and municipality in the Salyan Rayon of Azerbaijan. It has a population of 708.
