= Seyidsadıqlı =

- Municipality
- Location within Azerbaijan
- Coordinates: 39°32′38″N 48°55′14″E
- Country: Azerbaijan
- Rayon: Salyan

Population
  - Total: 1,055
- Time zone: UTC+4 (AZT)
  - Summer (DST): UTC+5 (AZT)

Seyidsadıqlı (also, Seidsadykhly) is a village and municipality in the Salyan Rayon of Azerbaijan. It has a population of 1,055.
