= Dayıkənd =

- Municipality
- Location within Azerbaijan
- Coordinates: 39°27′19″N 48°51′51″E
- Country: Azerbaijan
- Rayon: Salyan

Population
  - Total: 1,279
- Time zone: UTC+4 (AZT)
  - Summer (DST): UTC+5 (AZT)

Dayıkənd (also, Daykend and Dayykend) is a village and municipality in the Salyan Rayon of Azerbaijan. It has a population of 1,279.
