= Bəşirbəyli =

Beshirbeyli
- Azerbaijani: Bəşirbəyli
- Location within Azerbaijan
- Coordinates: 39°51′N 48°55′E
- Country: Azerbaijan
- District: Salyan
- Municipality: Pambıqkənd
- Time zone: UTC+4 (AZT)
  - Summer (DST): UTC+5 (AZT)

Bəşirbəyli (also, Beshirbeyli) is a village in the Salyan District of Azerbaijan. The village forms part of the municipality of Pambıqkənd.
