= Subh =

Subh may refer to:

- Subh of Cordoba, also known as Aurora, 10th-century queen of Cordoba and spouse of the Umayyad caliph al-Hakam II
- Sübh, a village in Neftchala Rayon, Azerbaijan
