= Quyçu =

- Municipality
- Location within Azerbaijan
- Coordinates: 39°32′36″N 48°55′13″E
- Country: Azerbaijan
- Rayon: Salyan

Population
  - Total: 704
- Time zone: UTC+4 (AZT)
  - Summer (DST): UTC+5 (AZT)

Quyçu is a village and municipality in the Salyan Rayon of Azerbaijan. It has a population of 704.
