= Düzənlik =

- Municipality
- Location within Azerbaijan
- Coordinates: 39°50′44″N 49°02′37″E
- Country: Azerbaijan
- Rayon: Salyan

Population (2008)
  - Total: 954
- Time zone: UTC+4 (AZT)
  - Summer (DST): UTC+5 (AZT)

Düzənlik is a village and municipality in the Salyan Rayon of Azerbaijan. It has a population of 954.
