= Mahmutlu =

Mahmutlu can refer to:

- Mahmutlu, Akseki
- Mahmutlu, Buldan
- Mahmutlu, Erzincan
- Mahmutlu, Karakoçan
- Mahmutlu, Merzifon
- Mahmutlu, Saimbeyli

== See also ==
- Mahmudlu (disambiguation)
