= Pirenópolis =

- Municipality
- Municipality of Pirenópolis
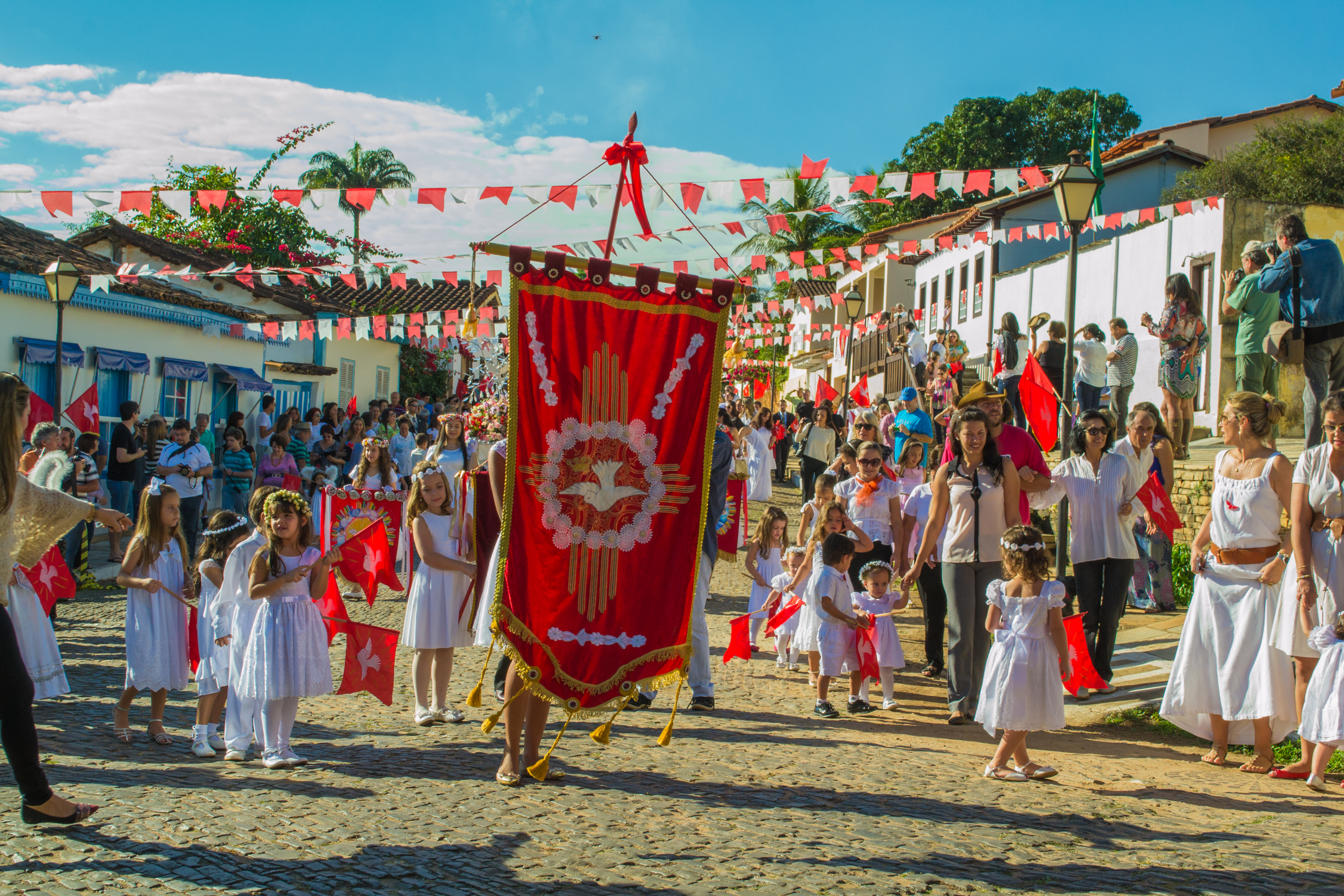
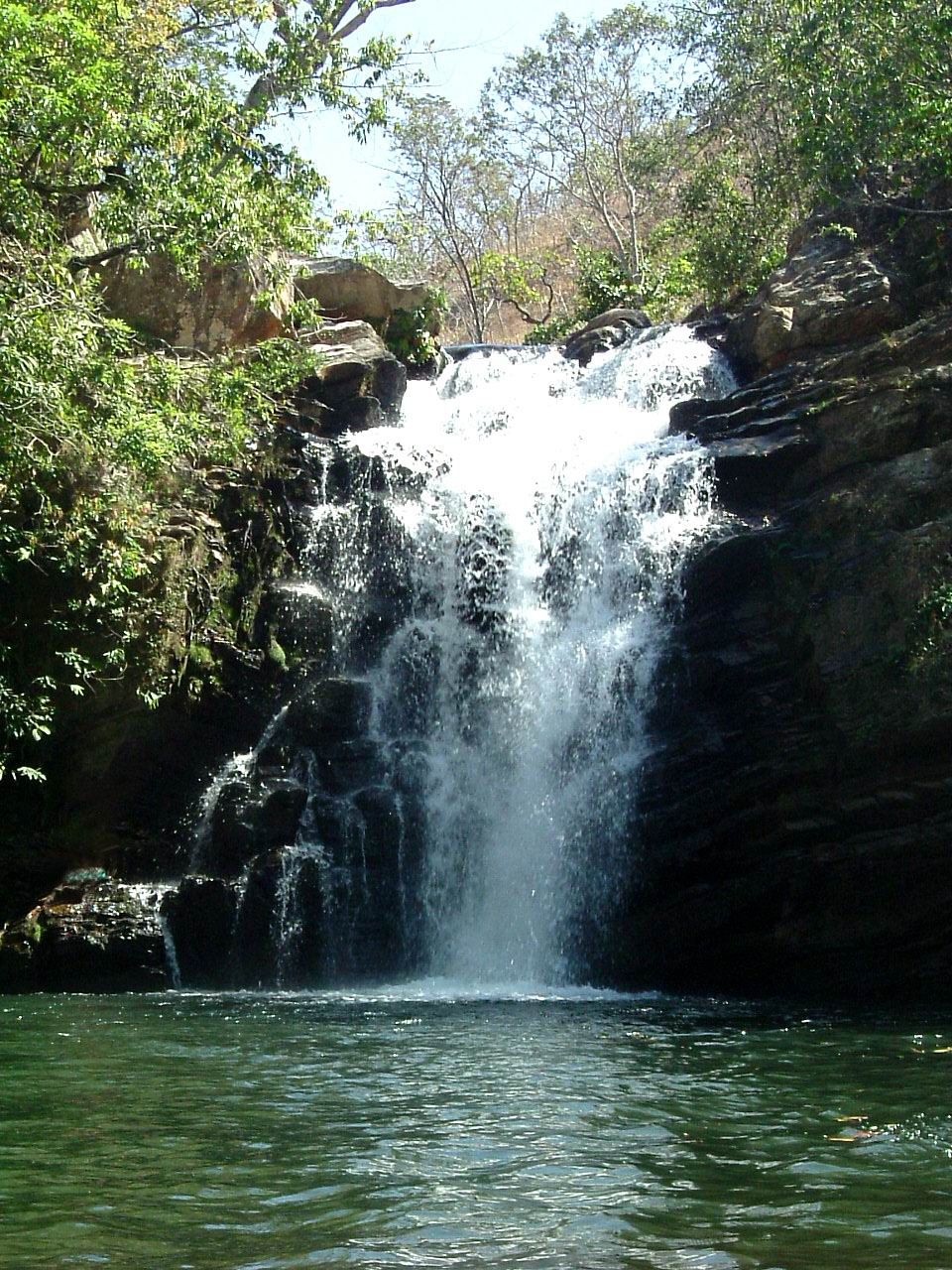
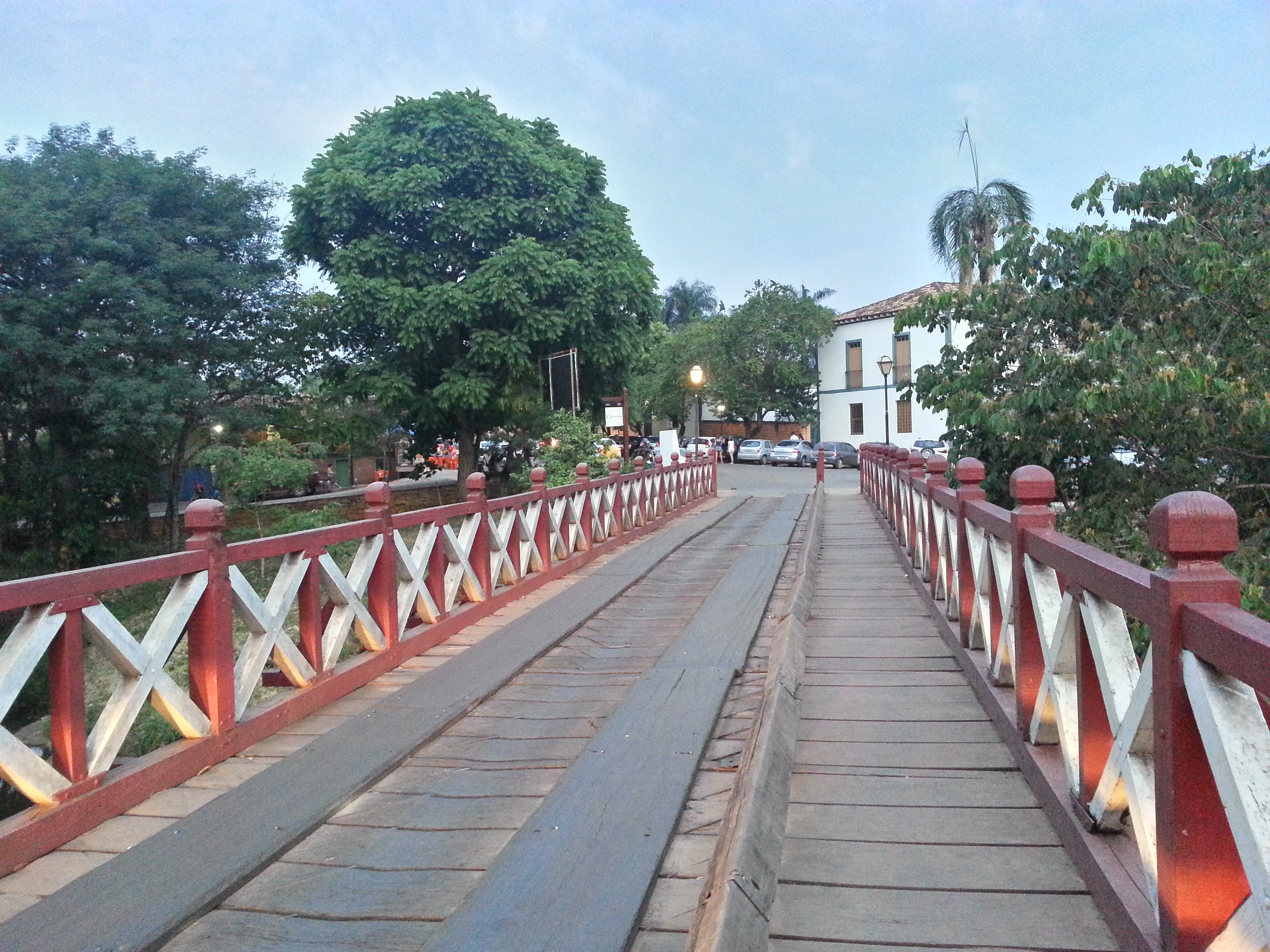
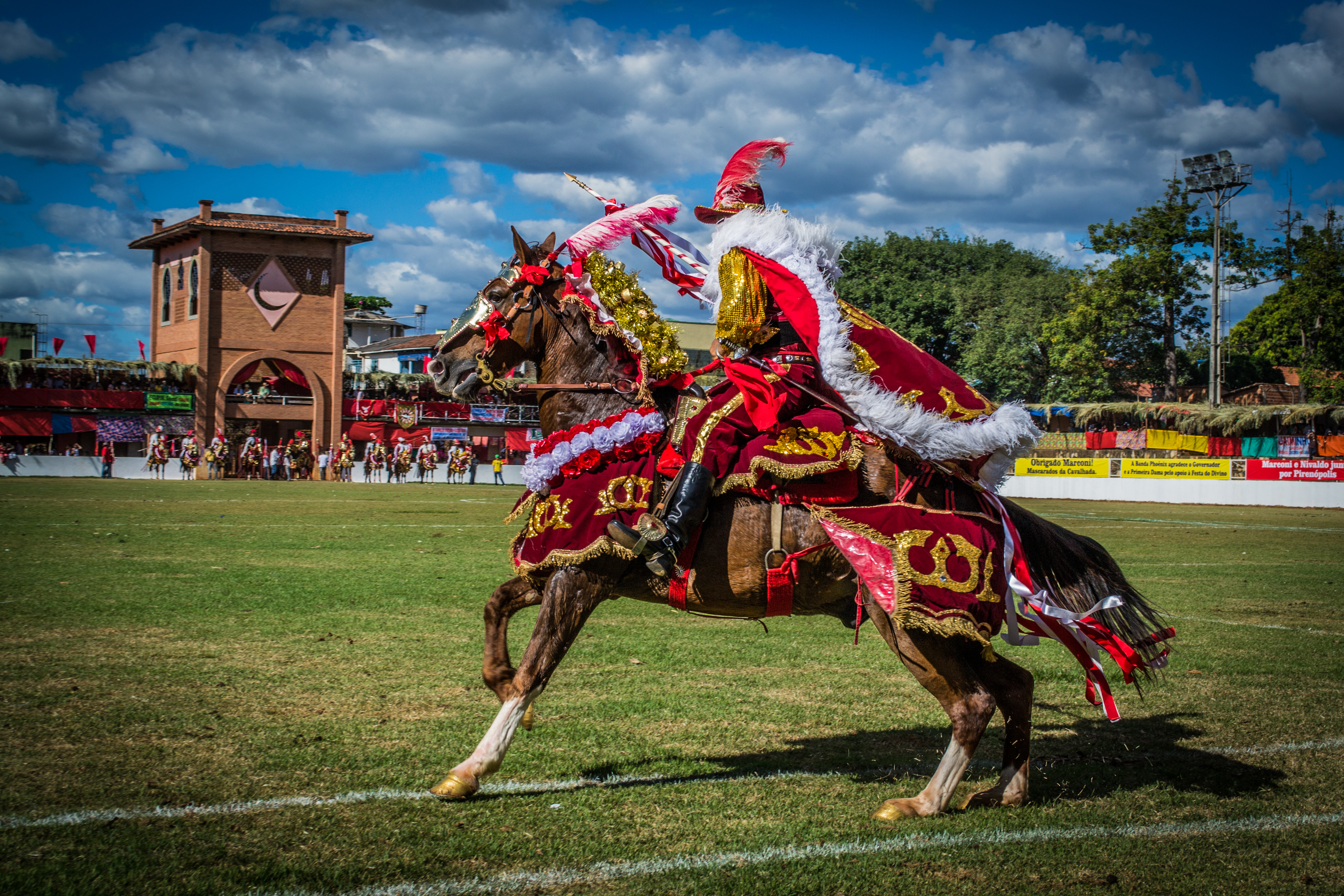
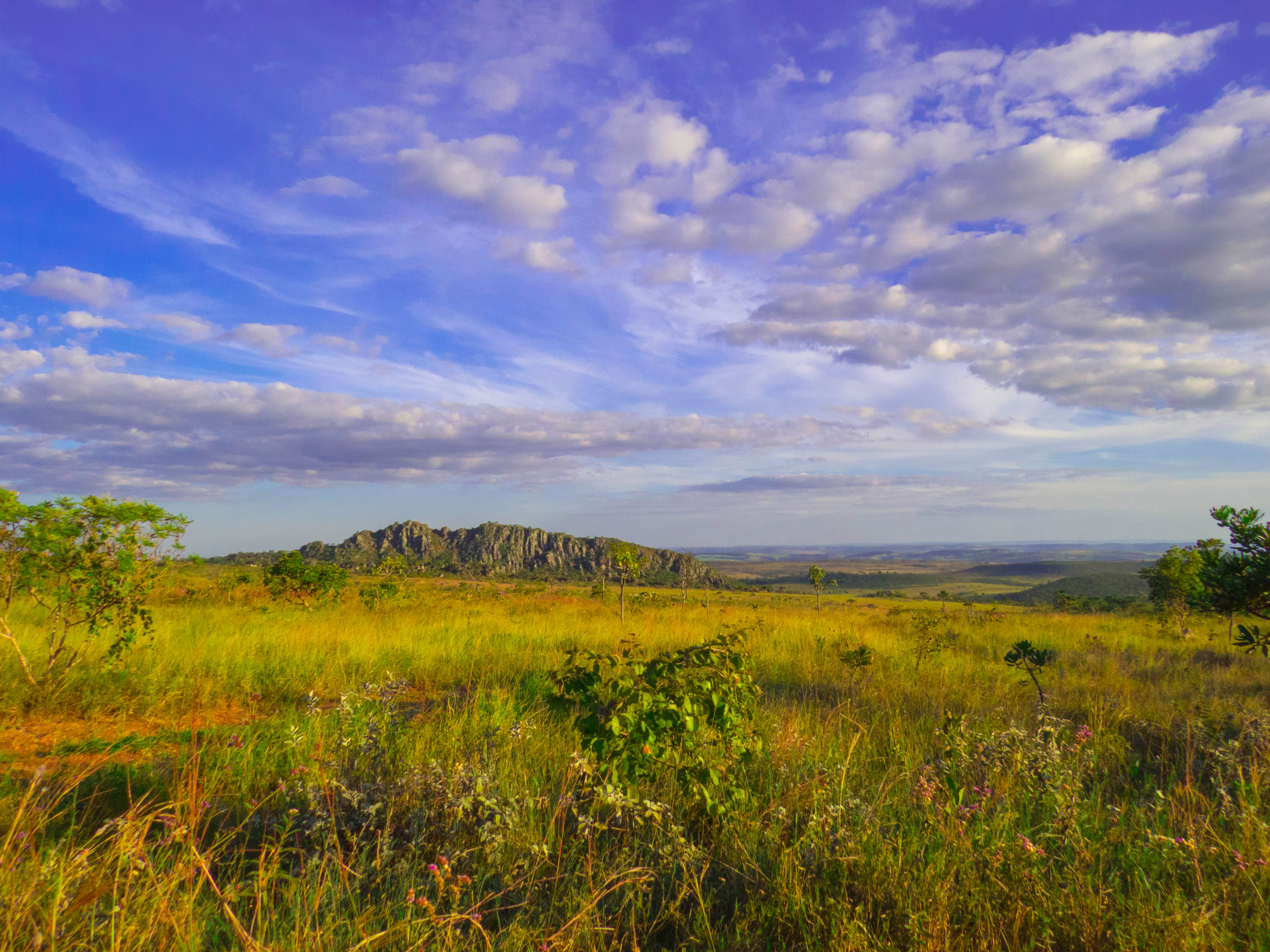
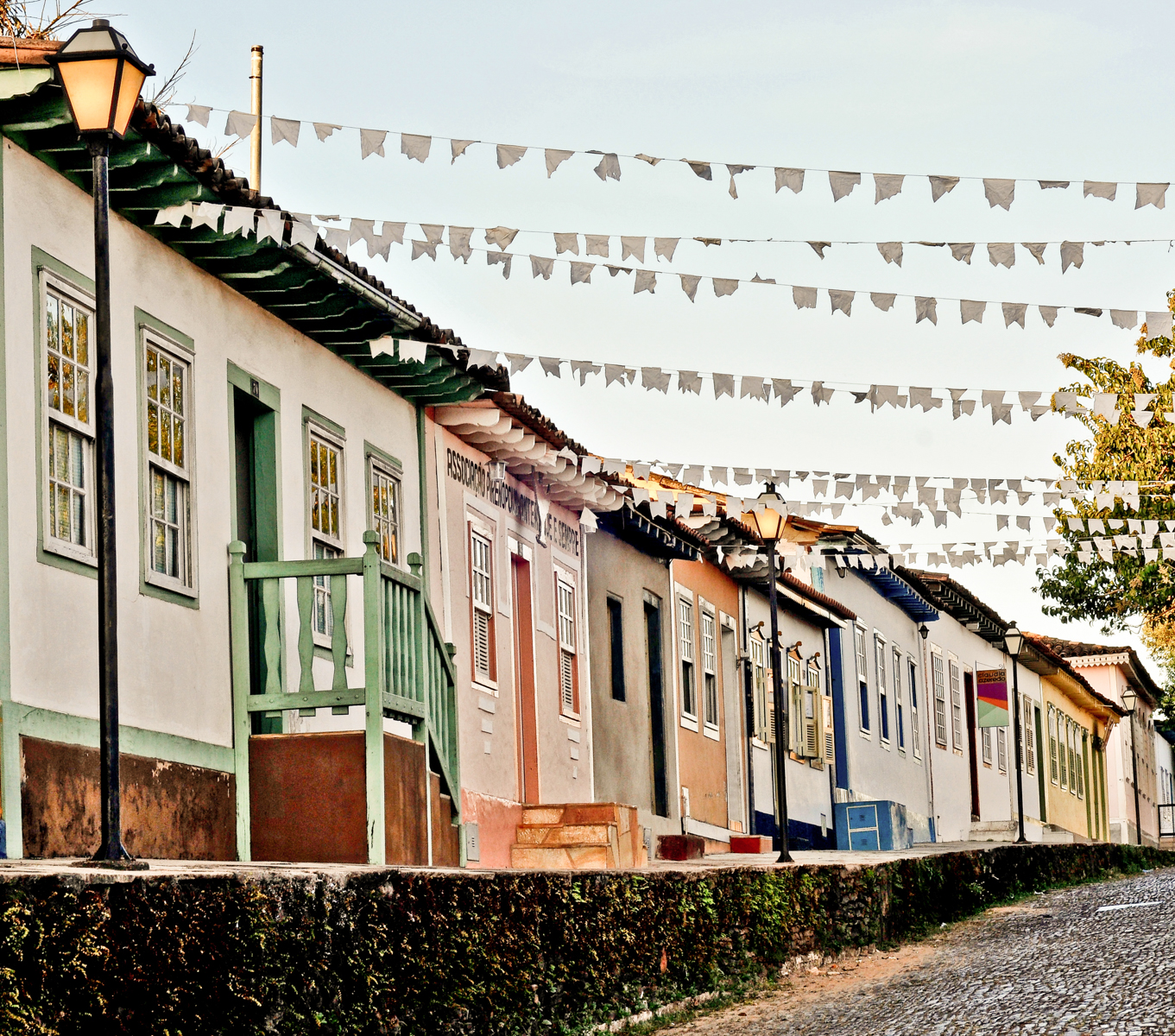
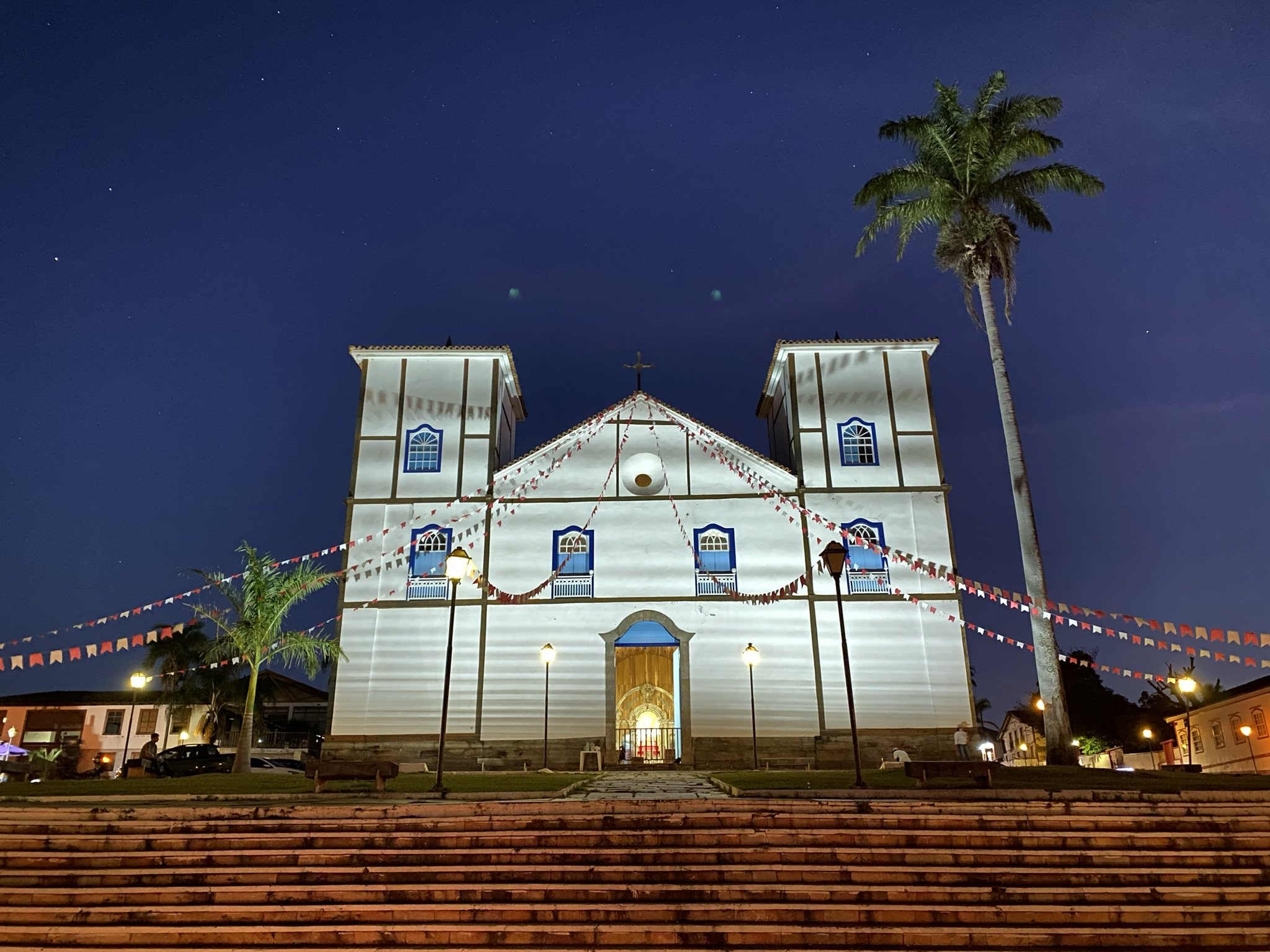
- Festa do Divino Espirírito Santo Santa Maria Waterfall Ponte do Carmo Knight of the Pirenópolis Cavalcades Pirineus State Park Historic center Igreja Matriz do Rosário

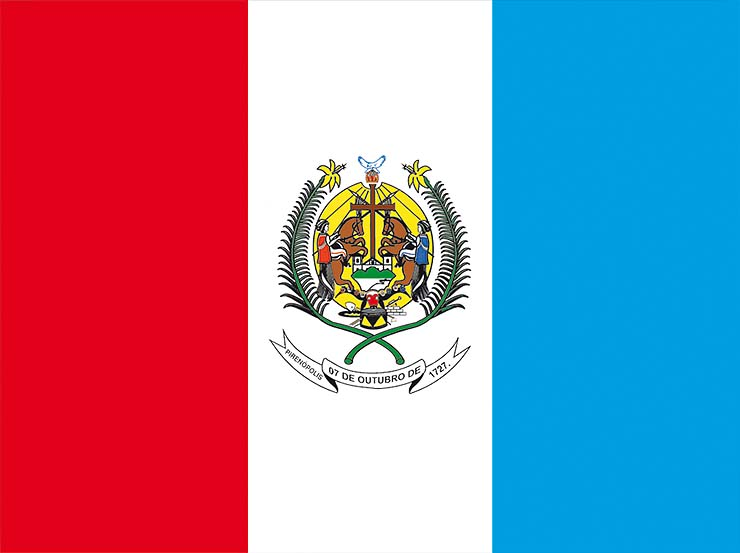
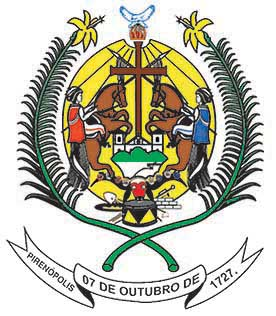
- Flag Coat of arms
- Nicknames: Cradle of the Goiana Press, rare Jewel of the center-west
- Location of Pirenópolis
- Coordinates: 15°51′07″S 48°57′32″W
- Country: Brazil
- Region: Centre-West
- State: Goiás
- Founded: 7 October 1727

Government
  - Mayor: Nivaldo Antônio de Melo
- Elevation: 770 m (2,530 ft)

Population (2020)
  - Total: 25,064
- Time zone: UTC−3 (BRT)
- Postal code: 72980-000
- HDI (2010): 0.693 – medium
- Website: pirenopolis.go.gov.br

Pirenópolis, also known as Piri, is a historic municipality located in the Brazilian state of Goiás. It is known for its waterfalls and Portuguese colonial architecture, and a popular festival involving mounted horses called Festa do Divino Espírito Santo which takes place 45 days after Easter. Pirenópolis is located 120 km from Goiânia, the state capital, and 150 km from Brasília, the federal capital.

== History ==
The history of Pirenópolis begins in 1727 when it was founded with the name of Minas de Nossa Senhora do Rosário de Meia Ponte, Meia Ponte (half a bridge) because half of the bridge over the Almas River was swept away in a flood. The first colonizers were Portuguese who came for the gold easily found in the Rio das Almas. From 1750 to 1800 there was a golden age when four churches were built and Pirenópolis competed with Vila Boa (present day Cidade de Goiás) as the richest town in the province. After 1800 a downturn over gold mining was set and the part of the population emigrated. With the change of commercial routes to Anápolis, the city became economically isolated. The first newspaper in the province, the Matutina Meiapontense, was published in Meia Ponte in 1830 by Joaquim Alves de Oliveira. In 1890 the city changed its name from Meia Ponte to Pirenópolis, the city of the Pireneus, the mountains located nearby. In 1960 with the construction of Brasília there was an intensive exploitation of the famous Pedra de Pirenópolis (quartzite-micáceo). In the 1980s the hippies arrived with their alternative communities and production of handicrafts. Pirenópolis was born again with a huge influx of tourists, especially from Brasília. Churches were restored and all the electrical wiring was put underground.

== Etymology ==
Pyrenópolis (archaic orthography), later Pirenópolis , means in Greek “the City of the Pireneus”. Its name comes from the mountain range that surrounds the city, that is Mountain range of the Pireneus . According to local tradition, the mountain range received this name for having in the region immigrant Spaniards, probably Catalans. Because of some similarity with their native Pyrenees of Europe, a mountain chain situated between Spain and France, they had then given this mountain range the Latin name of Pireneus.

== Historic site ==
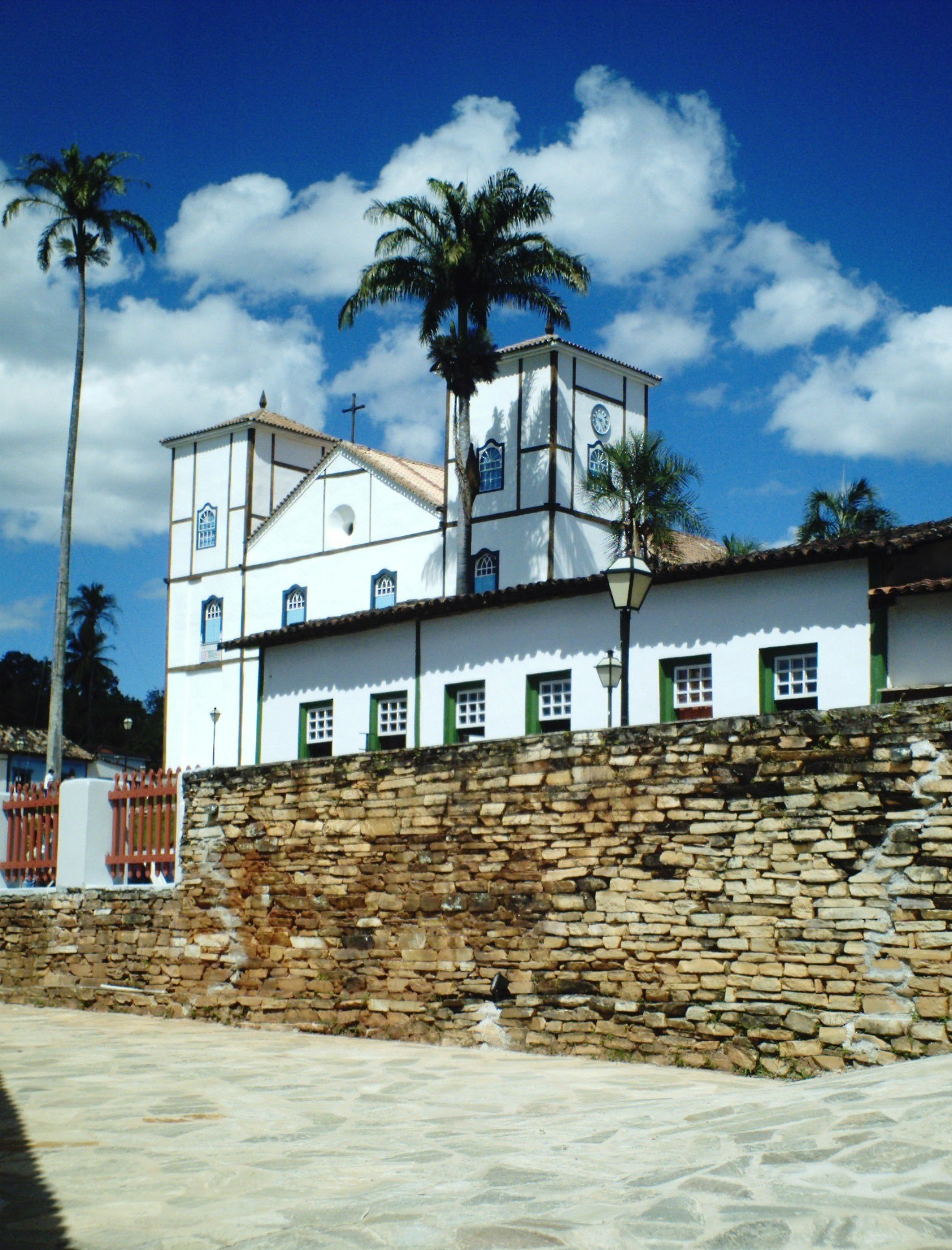
A church at Pirenópolis.

Listed as an architectural, urbanistic, landscape and historical heritage for IPHAN - the Institute of National Historic and Artistic Heritage, in 1989, the city has a Historical Center with large, ornate houses and churches of the 18th century, such as: First Church of Our Lady of the Rosary (1728–1732), Churches of Our Lady of the Carmo (1750–1754) and the Church of Our Lord of the Bonfim (Pirenópolis) (1750–1754), and buildings such as the Theater of Pirenópolis, a hybrid style between colonial and neo-classic, of 1899, and the Cine-Pireneus, built in the art-deco style, of 1919 and the House of Chamber and Jail constructed in 1919 as an identical restoration of the 1733 original.

== Climate ==
The climate is humid sub-tropical with two well-defined seasons: the rainy season, which goes from October to March, and the dry season, which goes from April to September. Parts of the municipality are mountainous and maintain some climatic variations due to altitude.

Climate data for Pirenópolis (1991–2020)
Month	Jan	Feb	Mar	Apr	May	Jun	Jul	Aug	Sep	Oct	Nov	Dec	Year
Mean daily maximum °C (°F)	30.0 (86.0)	30.4 (86.7)	30.4 (86.7)	30.9 (87.6)	30.5 (86.9)	30.1 (86.2)	30.6 (87.1)	32.5 (90.5)	33.7 (92.7)	32.9 (91.2)	30.5 (86.9)	30.0 (86.0)	31.0 (87.8)
Daily mean °C (°F)	23.7 (74.7)	23.6 (74.5)	23.6 (74.5)	23.4 (74.1)	22.0 (71.6)	20.9 (69.6)	21.0 (69.8)	23.1 (73.6)	25.2 (77.4)	25.1 (77.2)	24.0 (75.2)	23.8 (74.8)	23.3 (73.9)
Mean daily minimum °C (°F)	19.4 (66.9)	19.3 (66.7)	19.3 (66.7)	18.5 (65.3)	16.3 (61.3)	14.6 (58.3)	14.2 (57.6)	15.8 (60.4)	18.5 (65.3)	19.4 (66.9)	19.5 (67.1)	19.6 (67.3)	17.9 (64.2)
Average precipitation mm (inches)	281.7 (11.09)	238.4 (9.39)	254.7 (10.03)	155.3 (6.11)	28.5 (1.12)	6.4 (0.25)	1.8 (0.07)	11.1 (0.44)	37.0 (1.46)	134.9 (5.31)	239.8 (9.44)	277.7 (10.93)	1,667.3 (65.64)
Average precipitation days (≥ 1.0 mm)	18.9	16.7	18.0	10.7	2.7	0.9	0.2	0.9	3.8	11.2	16.1	18.6	118.7
Average relative humidity (%)	79.5	79.8	80.2	76.1	69.1	62.9	54.6	45.9	48.3	63.1	76.0	79.1	67.9
Average dew point °C (°F)	20.3 (68.5)	20.4 (68.7)	20.5 (68.9)	19.6 (67.3)	17.1 (62.8)	14.7 (58.5)	12.7 (54.9)	11.8 (53.2)	13.9 (57.0)	17.8 (64.0)	19.9 (67.8)	20.2 (68.4)	17.4 (63.3)
Mean monthly sunshine hours	148.3	147.4	163.1	202.8	242.0	247.9	268.0	268.3	217.7	198.2	148.3	137.2	2,389.2
Source: NOAA

== Economic information ==
The economy is based on agriculture (coffee, citrus fruits, soybeans, and corn), cattle raising (130,000 head in 2006), services, public administration, and small transformation industries. There are several small food, clothing, and furniture industries.

Agricultural data 2006

- Farms: 1,765
- Total area: 191,778 ha.
- Area of permanent crops: 1,920 ha.
- Area of perennial crops: 4,185 ha.
- Area of natural pasture: 125,908 ha.
- Area of woodland and forests: 52,775 ha.
- Persons dependent on farming: 4,300
- Number of tractors: 177
- Cattle herd: 144,700 IBGE

== Education and Health ==
- Higher education: Campus of the State University of Goiás
- Adult literacy rate: 84.4% (2000) (national average was 86.4%)
- Hospitals: 2 with 66 beds
- Infant mortality rate: 27.52 (2000) (national average was 33.0).
- Human Development Index: 0.713
- State ranking: 191 (out of 242 municipalities)
- National ranking: 2,748 (out of 5,507 municipalities) Frigoletto

== Tourism ==
Major attractions include Igreja Nossa Senhora do Rosário de Meia Ponte, the oldest church in Goiás, and the church Igreja Nosso Senhor do Bonfim. It also has a hippie-like colony which markets clothing and silverwork.

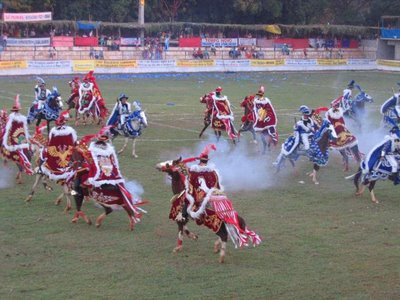
Festas de Cavalhadas.

Today Pirenópolis is known all over Brazil for its popular festivals, especially the "Cavalhadas", introduced in 1826, in which horsemen representing Moors and Christians recreate a battle fought by Charlemagne. This tradition, part of the Festival for the Holy Spirit (Festa do Espírito Santo), was brought to the town by Portuguese settlers. The Festas de Cavalhadas feature a parade beginning with a bugle fanfare announcing the knight's pages, then the mounted knights displaying their colors. Wearing papier-maché helmets, the Christian knights wear blue, the Moors wear red. The battle lasts three days and attracts thousands of visitors to the town. The Cavalhadas take place in medieval costume, with the highlight being the mock battle, performed in the city's bullring. The Moors invariably are defeated and convert to Christianity. Cavalhadas

The town has been restored artistically with its stone paved streets and colonial houses (casarões). The Almas River, a tributary of the Tocantins River which flows north to form the Serra da Mesa artificial lake, passes near the town and is crossed by a restored wooden bridge. There are an old theater, cinema, and a museum of the cavalhadas.

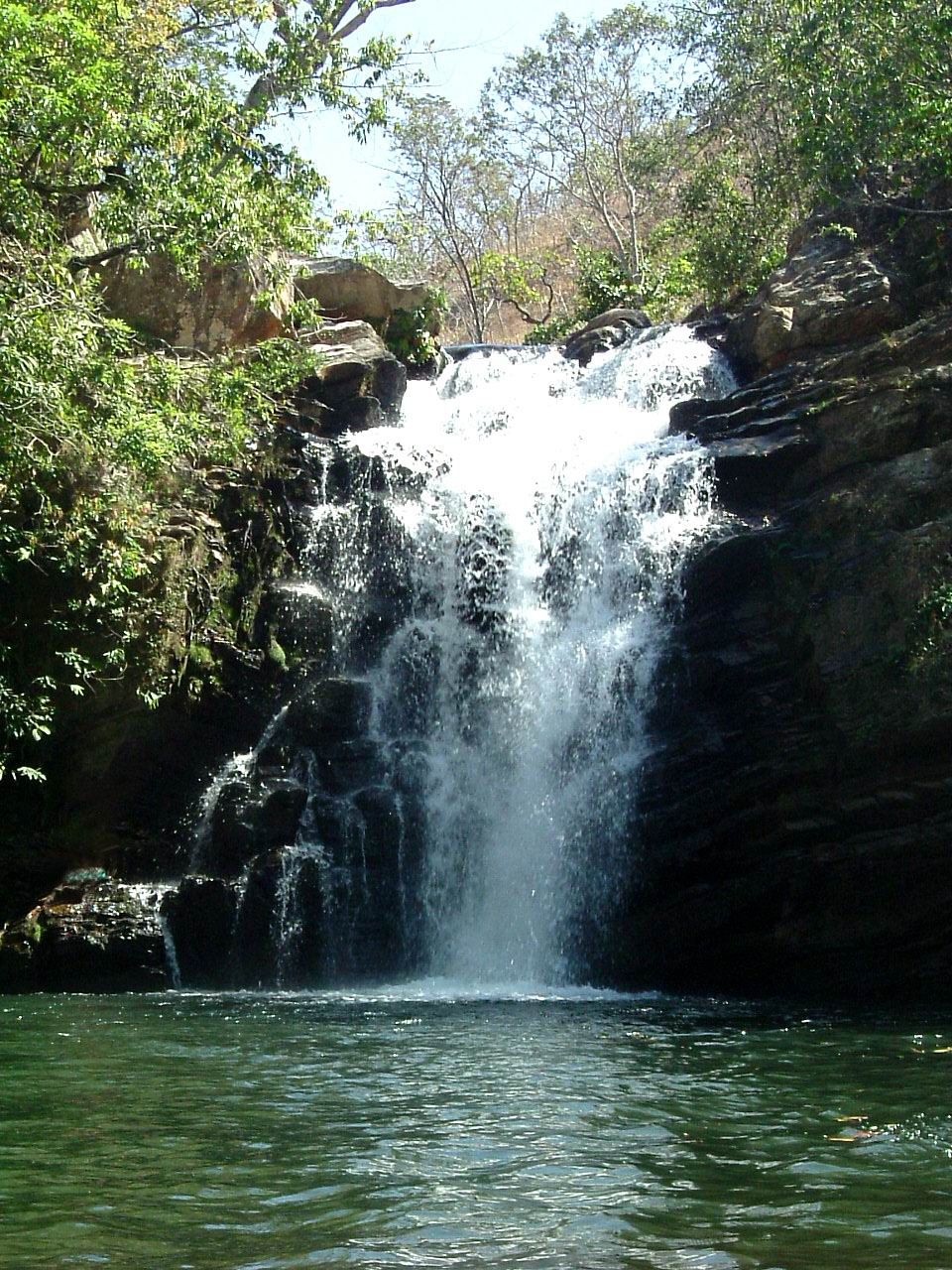
The Waterfall Vargem Grande in Pirenópolis.

The municipality contains part of the 2,833 hectares (7,000 acres) Pirineus State Park, created in 1987. Waterfalls are the primary tourist attraction for Pirenopolis and Corumbá. Around the town, in a distance of 15 km., there are more than twenty spectacular waterfalls with pristine water. Some of them are enormous such as the Salto de Corumba (which disappeared for decades when prospectors diverted the waters for dredging). Other waterfalls are formed by a series of cascades. Many are on private property and are operated as a business. Other falls can be found on hiking trails. One of the longest rivers in the state of Goiás, the Corumbá River has its source near Pirenópolis.

A new attraction to Pirenopolis is the small ecovillage and permaculture design institute located a few kilometers outside of town called the IPEC or The Institute of Permaculture and Ecovillage of the Cerrado. Bringing in foreign students through study abroad programs such as Living Routes, visitors get a first-hand account of the possibilities of sustainable living.

=== Waterfalls ===
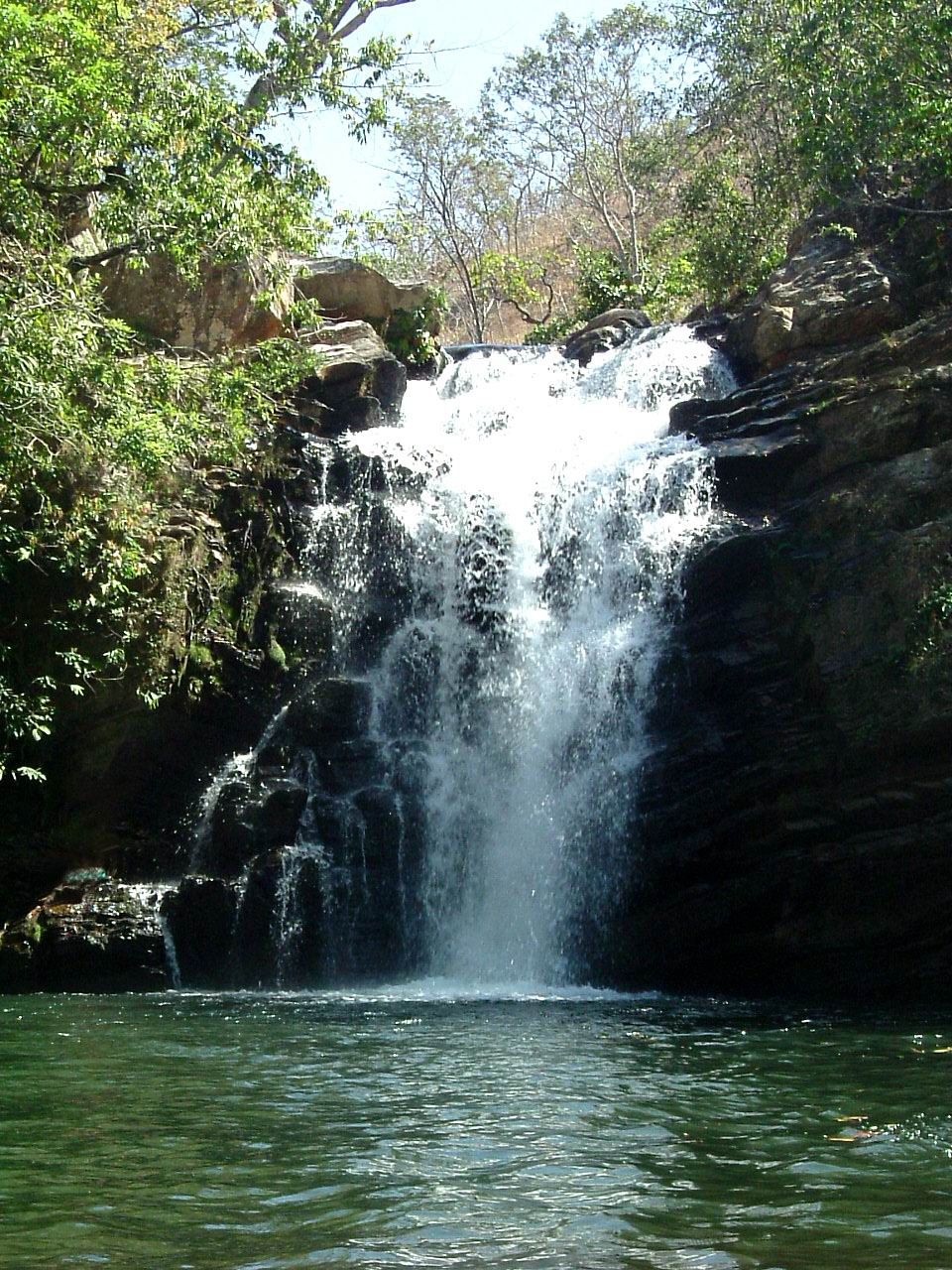
Waterfall Santa Maria, inside Vargem Grande farm.

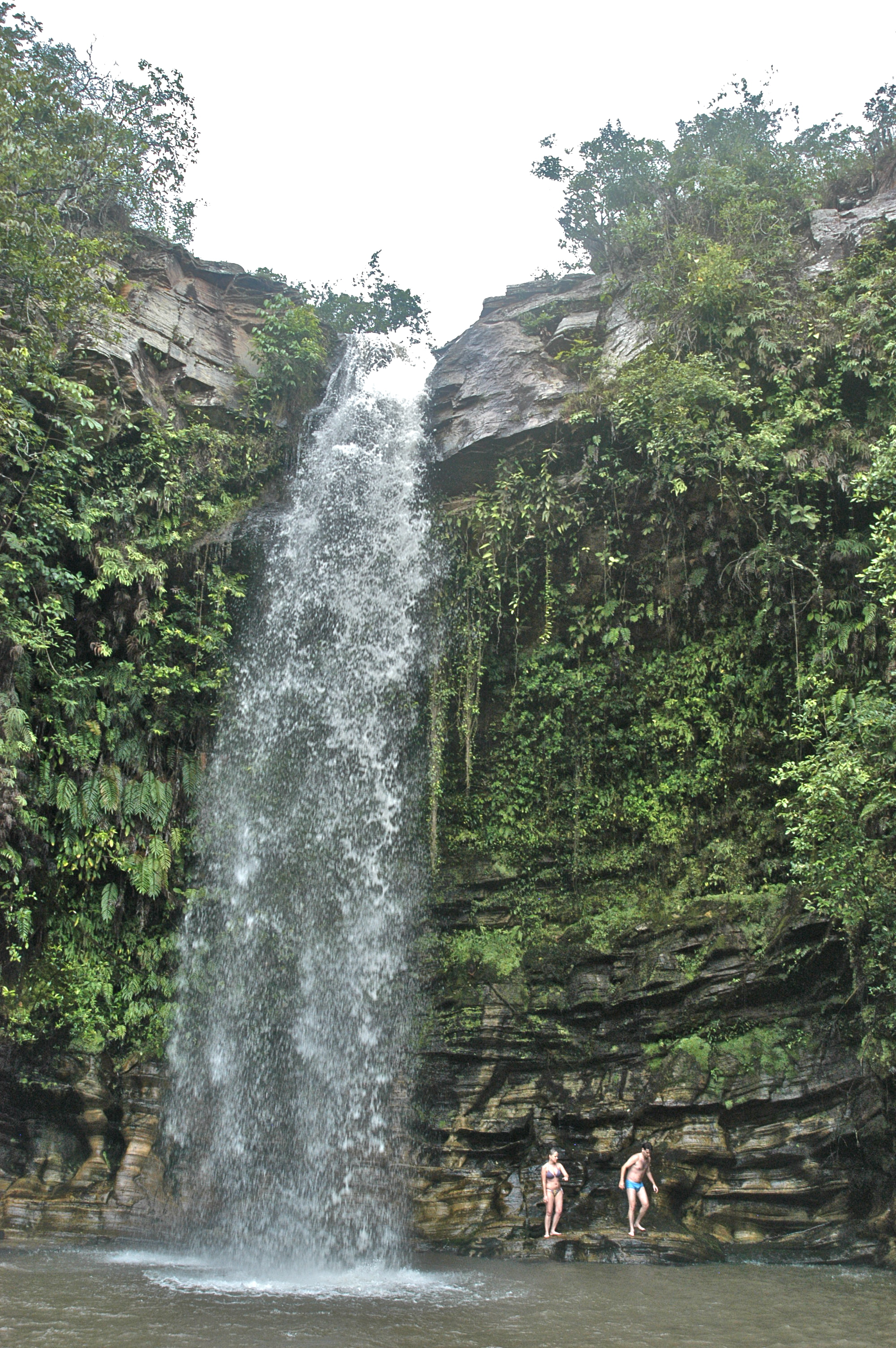
Abade waterfall

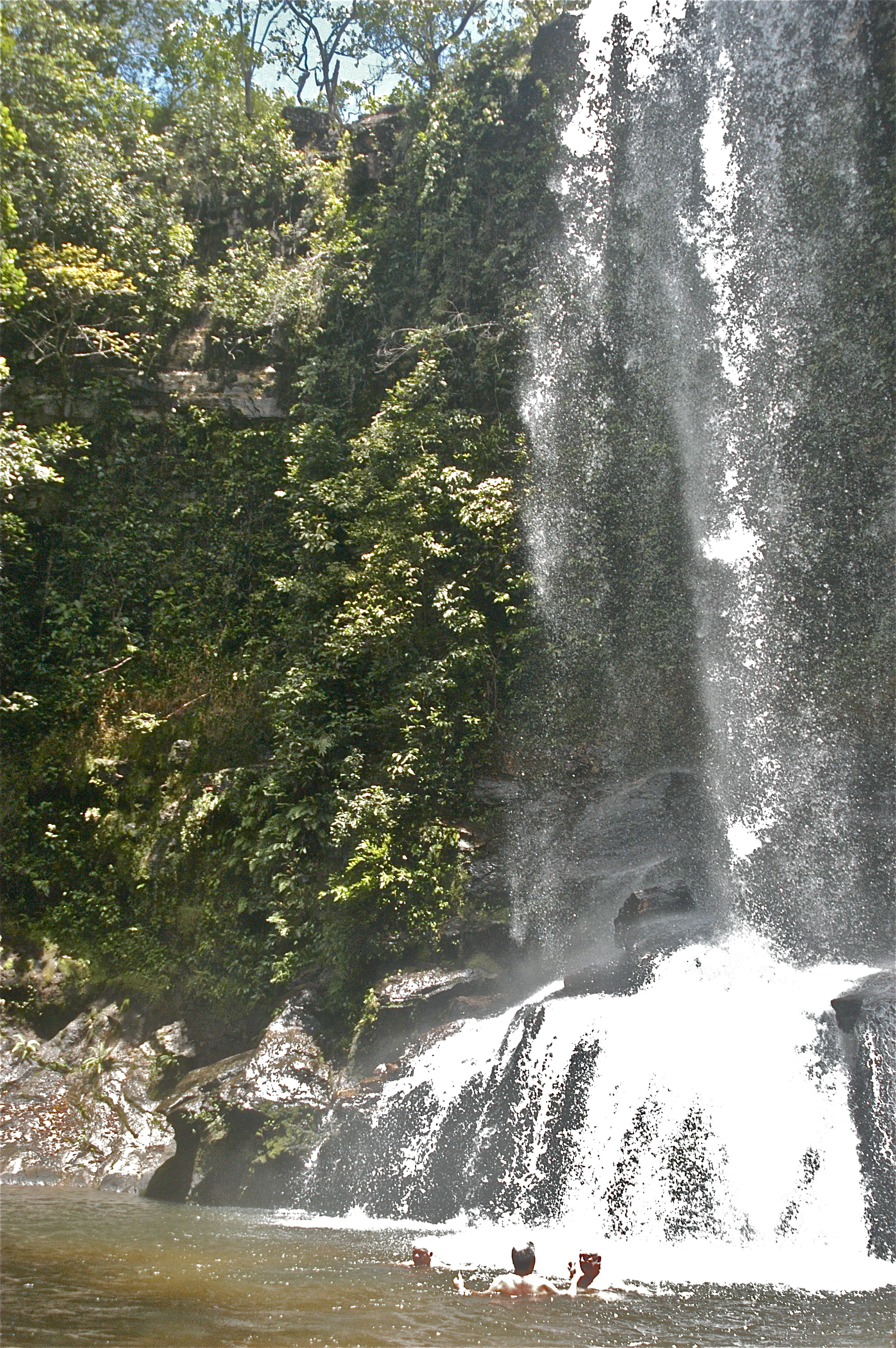
Rosário waterfall

== See also ==
- Church of Our Lady of the Rosary of Black Men
- Our Lady of the Rosary Parish
- List of municipalities in Goiás
