= Şıxlı, Agdash =

Şıxlı
- Village
- Location within Azerbaijan
- Coordinates: 40°37′42″N 47°24′14″E
- Country: Azerbaijan
- Rayon: Agdash
- Time zone: UTC+4 (AZT)
- Postal code: AZ0329

Şıxlı (also known as Sıxlı, Shikhly, and Shykhly) is a village in the Agdash District of Azerbaijan. It functions as a rural administrative settlement within the district and is officially serviced by the Agdash postal branch under the national postal code AZ0329.
