= Ərəbqardaşbəyli, Salyan =

Ərəbqardaşbəyli
- Municipality
- Location within Azerbaijan
- Coordinates: 39°31′53″N 49°00′46″E
- Country: Azerbaijan
- Rayon: Salyan

Population
  - Total: 935
- Time zone: UTC+4 (AZT)
  - Summer (DST): UTC+5 (AZT)

Ərəbqardaşbəyli (also, Arabkardashbeyli) is a village and municipality in the Salyan Rayon of Azerbaijan. It has a population of 935.
