= Azermarka =

- Company type: State-owned company
- Industry: Postage stamps
- Genre: Philately
- Founded: 1991
- Headquarters: Drogalny Street 702, 370010, Baku, Azerbaijan
- Area served: Azerbaijan
- Products: Postage stamps
- Owner: Republic of Azerbaijan
- Website: Azermarka.az (in Azerbaijani and English)

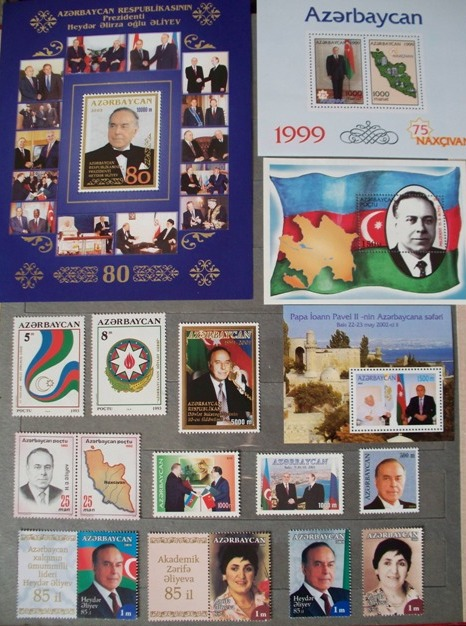
Definitive and commemorative stamps of prominent Azerbaijanis produced by Azermarka.

Azermarka (Azerbaijani: Azərmarka) was the Azerbaijani state company responsible for the production and sale of Azerbaijani postage stamps. It is not to be confused with the Azerbaijan Post Office, Azerpost, which is a separate organisation.

Since 1992 a variety of definitive and commemorative stamps have been produced depicting topical and local subjects. First day covers and postal stationery have also been issued.

On 27 April 2021 it was merged with Azərpoçt.

== See also ==
- Azərpoçt, the national postal service of Azerbaijan
- Postage stamps and postal history of Azerbaijan
