= Church of Our Lady of the Rosary of Black Men (Pirenópolis) =

Church in Pirenópolis, Goiás, Brazil

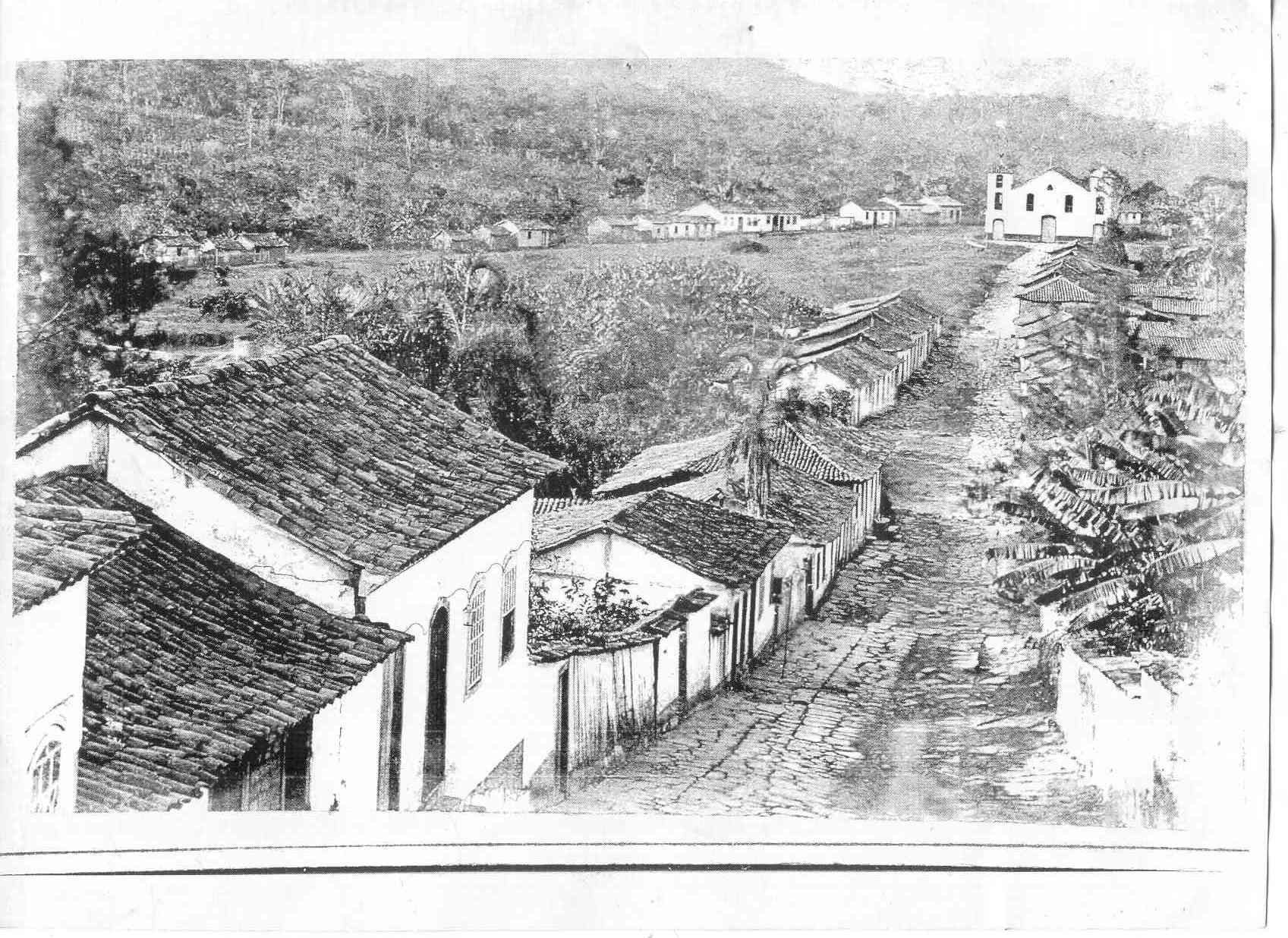
View from the Church of the Rosary, circa 1886.

The Church of Our Lady of the Rosary of Black Men was a Roman Catholic church located in Pirenópolis, in the Brazilian state of Goiás. It was built between 1743 and 1757 by a fraternity of black men, since Afro-Brazilians were forbidden from attending other local churches. It was demolished in 1944 by order of the Roman Catholic Diocese of Goiás. It was located where today stands the Praça do Coreto, which has a memorial in its honor. Of all the churches in the city, Our Lady of the Rosary of Black Men contained the most altars; seven in total. According to journalist Jarbas Jayme, these altars were "artistically carved and of costly and beautiful architecture". Its main altar is now located within the Mother Church of Our Lady of the Rosary and its two lateral altars are now located in the Church of Our Lady of Carmo.

== History ==
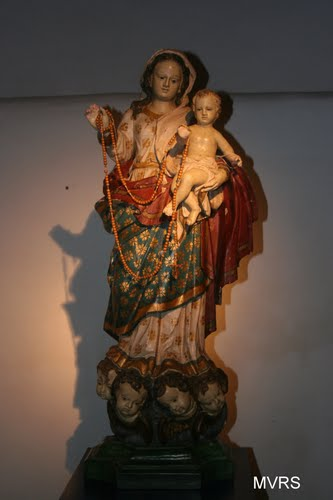
Our Lady of the Rosary of Black Men. This image once belonged to the church, but is now in the Church of Our Lady of Carmo.

The Church of Our Lady of the Rosary of Black Men was built between 1743 and 1757, according to the two documents available. It was built by thousands of slaves at a time when mining was the main economic activity of the city. It had a colonial style and its main altar had enthroned the image of Our Lady of the Rosary, now housed by the Church of Our Lady of Carmo. The two niches of this altar had images of Saint Raphael and Saint Benedict. Both images are now in the Mother Church of Our Lady of the Rosary. The right side altar was dedicated to Saint Sebastian, whose image was taken to the Church of Bonfim and stolen from there in 1978. The left side altar was dedicated to Saint Benedict the Moor, whose image is now in the Mother Church of Our Lady of the Rosary.

With the end of the Brazilian Gold Rush in the late 18th century, the local economy began to base itself in agriculture and the city became impoverished. Nevertheless, the Fraternity of Our Lady of the Rosary of Black Men strove to preserve the church for the next centuries. For over a century after its construction the church had only one tower, on the west side. In 1870, a second tower was built in its east side. At the same time, restoration work was conducted on the roof and walls. In 1886 the old clock of the Mother Church – the first public clock in Pirenópolis – was transferred to the Church of the Rosary. After the signing of the Golden Law in 1888, the Black population of the city grew increasingly poor and in lack of funds to keep the church clean and well maintained.

In the early 20th century the church suffered from a series of alterations in its original aspect. Its towers, sacristy and consistory were destroyed, and its façade was altered from its colonial style to a neo-Gothic one. The church was demolished in 1944 by order of then Bishop Emanuel Gomes de Oliveira. Its two lateral altars, along with its main altar, were taken to the Church of Our Lady of Carmo, while its bell was taken to the Church of Our Lord of Bonfim. Images, implements, vestments, furniture and other belongings of the church were distributed among the three other churches of the city. In 2002, after a fire partially destructed the Mother Church of Our Lady of the Rosary, the main altar of Our Lady of the Rosary of Black Men was set up in that church.

== See also ==
- Our Lady of the Rosary Parish

== Bibliographic references ==
- Jayme, Jarbas (1895-1968). Esbôço histórico de Pirenópolis. Pirenópolis: Prefeitura Municipal, 1971.
- Matos, Raimundo José da Cunha (1776-1839). Corografia histórica da província de Goiás. Rio de Janeiro: IHGB, 1979.
- Augustin Saint-Hilaire. Viagem à província de Goiás. Belo Horizonte: Ed. Itatiaia, 1975.
- Jayme, Jarbas (1895-1968) and Jayme, José Sizenando (1916-1994). Casas de Pirenópolis. Goiânia: Universidade Católica de Goiás, 2002.
