= Bala Surra =

- Location within Azerbaijan
- Coordinates: 39°31′N 49°01′E
- Country: Azerbaijan
- Rayon: Neftchala
- Municipality: Ərəbqardaşbəyli
- Time zone: UTC+4 (AZT)
  - Summer (DST): UTC+5 (AZT)

Bala Surra is a village in the Neftchala Rayon of Azerbaijan. The village forms part of the municipality of Ərəbqardaşbəyli.
