= Arabdzhabirli Vtoroye =

İkinci Ərəbcəbirli
- Location within Azerbaijan
- Coordinates: 40°38′N 47°43′E
- Country: Azerbaijan
- Rayon: Goychay
- Municipality: Ərəbcəbirli
- Time zone: UTC+4 (AZT)
  - Summer (DST): UTC+5 (AZT)

Arabdzhabirli Vtoroye (Azerbaijani: İkinci Ərəbcəbirli) is a village in the Goychay Rayon of Azerbaijan. The village forms part of the municipality of Ərəbcəbirli.
