= Cəngan, Salyan =

Cəngan
- Municipality
- Location within Azerbaijan
- Coordinates: 39°43′36″N 48°56′32″E
- Country: Azerbaijan
- Rayon: Salyan

Population
  - Total: 348
- Time zone: UTC+4 (AZT)
  - Summer (DST): UTC+5 (AZT)

Cəngan (also, Dzhangyan and Mugan’-Dzhangen) is a village and the least populous municipality in the Salyan Rayon of Azerbaijan. It has a population of 348.
