= İkinci Varlı =

Village in Salyan Rayon, Azerbaijan

Coordinates: 39°48′N 49°04′E

İkinci Varlı is a village and municipality in the Salyan Rayon of Azerbaijan. It has a population of 822.
