= Kürsəngi =

Kursangi Kürsəngi
- Village
- Kursangi
- Location within Azerbaijan
- Coordinates: 39°46′51″N 49°07′24″E
- Country: Azerbaijan
- Rayon: Salyan

Population (2020)
  - Total: 4,000
- Time zone: UTC+4 (AZT)
  - Summer (DST): UTC+5 (AZT)

Kürsəngi (Kursangi, Gursangya) is a village and municipality in the Salyan District of Azerbaijan. It has a population of 4000.
