= Qədimkənd =

Gadimkend
- Municipality
- Azerbaijani: Qədimkənd
- Location within Azerbaijan
- Coordinates: 39°26′02″N 49°03′46″E
- Country: Azerbaijan
- District: Neftchala

Population
  - Total: 2,320
- Time zone: UTC+4 (AZT)
  - Summer (DST): UTC+5 (AZT)

Qədimkənd (also, Gadimkend) is a village and municipality in the Neftchala District of Azerbaijan. It has a population of 2,320. The municipality consists of the villages of Gadimkend and Birinji Garaly.
