= Dzhangyan =

- Location within Azerbaijan
- Coordinates: 39°34′00″N 49°01′25″E
- Country: Azerbaijan
- Rayon: Salyan
- Time zone: UTC+4 (AZT)
  - Summer (DST): UTC+5 (AZT)

Dzhangyan (also Dzhangan) is a village in the Salyan Rayon of Azerbaijan.
