= Arabdzhabirli =

Arabdzhabirli Ərəbcəbirli
- Municipality
- Country: Azerbaijan
- District: Goychay Rayon

Population
  - Total: 3,839

Arabdzhabirli (Azerbaijani: Ərəbcəbirli) (also Arab Dzhabirly) is a municipality in the Goychay Rayon of Azerbaijan. It has a population of 3,839. The municipality consists of the villages of Birinci Ərəbcəbirli ("First Ərəbcəbirli") and İkinci Ərəbcəbirli ("Second Ərəbcəbirli").
