= İkinci Əlicanlı =

- Municipality
- Location within Azerbaijan
- Coordinates: 40°20′21″N 47°35′59″E
- Country: Azerbaijan
- Rayon: Zardab

Population
  - Total: 372
- Time zone: UTC+4 (AZT)
  - Summer (DST): UTC+5 (AZT)

İkinci Əlicanlı (also, İkinci Alıcanlı, Alidzhanly Vtoryye, Alydzhanly, Alydzhanly Vtoroy, and Alydzhanly Vtoroye) is a village and municipality in the Zardab Rayon of Azerbaijan. It has a population of 372.
