= Mahmudlu, Qubadli =

Mahmudlu
- Location within Azerbaijan
- Coordinates: 39°22′10″N 46°34′19″E
- Country: Azerbaijan
- District: Qubadli
- Time zone: UTC+4 (AZT)
  - Summer (DST): UTC+5 (AZT)

Mahmudlu is a village in the Qubadli District of Azerbaijan.
