= Birinci Qaralı =

Birinji Garaly
- Azerbaijani: Birinci Qaralı
- Location within Azerbaijan
- Coordinates: 39°27′N 49°02′E
- Country: Azerbaijan
- District: Neftchala
- Municipality: Gadimkend
- Time zone: UTC+4 (AZT)
  - Summer (DST): UTC+5 (AZT)

Birinci Qaralı (also, Birinji Garaly) is a village in the Neftchala District of Azerbaijan. The village forms part of the municipality of Gadimkend.
