= İkinci Şordəhnə =

- Location within Azerbaijan
- Coordinates: 40°36′33″N 47°30′32″E
- Country: Azerbaijan
- Rayon: Agdash
- Time zone: UTC+4 (AZT)
  - Summer (DST): UTC+5 (AZT)

İkinci Şordəhnə (also, Beylik-Shordekhne, Shordakhna Vtoroye, and Shordekhna Vtoroye) is a village in the Agdash Rayon of Azerbaijan.
