= Azərpoçt =

Azerbaijani postal company

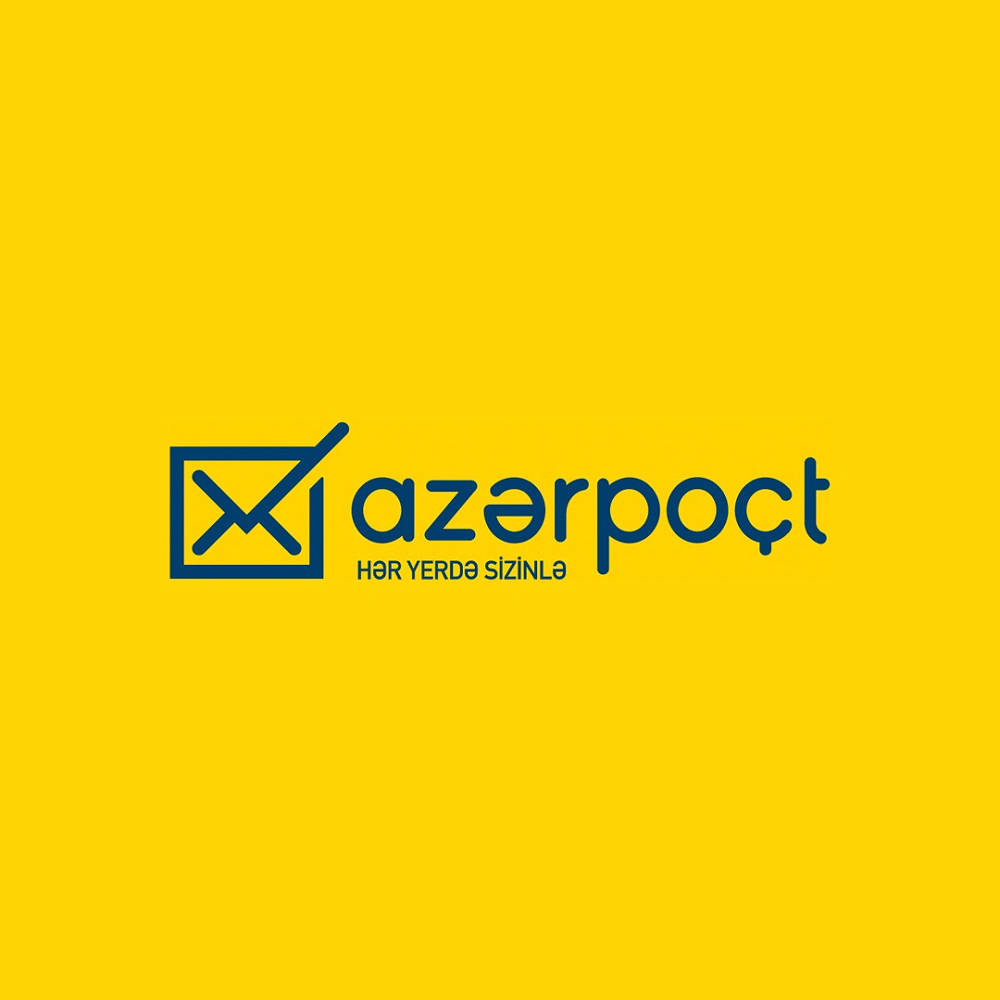
- Company type: State-owned company
- Industry: Postal service
- Founded: 29 September 1999
- Headquarters: Baku, Azerbaijan
- Area served: Azerbaijan / Worldwide
- Key people: Director General - Afghan Jalilov
- Services: Postal delivery/Package delivery/Mail collecting
- Revenue: 773.5 million Azerbaijani manat (2007)
- Owner: Republic of Azerbaijan
- Parent: AZCON Holding
- Website: www.azerpost.az (in Azerbaijani and English)

Previous logo until April 2021.

Azərpoçt is the company responsible for postal service in Azerbaijan.

Azərpoçt was founded on 29 September 1999 by the Ministry of Communication of Azerbaijan, by order "Number 151" titled "On continuation of reforms and improvement of a structure in post communication field". It replaced the previous "Azərpoçt İstehsalat Birliyi" (Azerpost Production Union) which had been created following the fall of the Soviet Union in 1991. Azərpoçt became the national postal operator in 2004, and covers all territories of Azerbaijan.

Azərpoçt has 4 affiliated branches. These are sorting and technical support services, express mail and special communication. Azərpoçt itself has 71 branches. These provide postal services and some commercial services to customers through the post offices. There are about 1,500 post offices of Azərpoçt. They are under the supervision of the branches and primarily provide postal services.

== Services ==
- Traditional postal or parcel services
- Non-traditional services (banking, insurance, etc.)
- Financial services – electronic payments (pensions, social benefits, money transfers, etc.), collection of payments (payments for public utilities, taxes), deposits (term and termless), sale of other savings products, improvement of existing money order system, issuance of debit cards (on the base of customers’ deposits) and date of birth.
- E-government e-services – issuance of various certificates, business and personal documents by local and central executive bodies,
- Payment of taxes, duties and other fees to local and central executive bodies;
- E-services of business, e-commerce, opening of cyber-mail and e-mail addresses, access to Internet network, information, and electronic databases.

== Development history ==
The first systematized postal communication within the modern-borders of Azerbaijan, was created in 1501 by Ismail I, the shah of Safavid Iran, for improving the economy, protecting the country from enemies, as well as establishing a robust state management system, and gathering information from remote areas of the country.

A modern post system was brought to Azerbaijan in the early 19th century, when it was part of the Russian Empire, and the first post office was opened in 1818 in Yelisavetpol (current Ganja). The first post of communication was created in Azerbaijan on June 1, 1818. Later on, post expeditions were organized in Baku in 1826, in Nakhchivan on March 12, 1828. On June 15, 1830, the establishment of a post bureau with the first degree in Shamakhi and Shusha was aimed to develop economic connections between Russia and the South Caucasus. So the first post bureaus appeared in Azerbaijan during the 1830s (first class in Shusha, Shamakhi, Baku and Nakhchivan, second class in Ganja and Quba).

Using railway for delivering postal items between Baku and Tbilisi on May 9, 1883, and between Baku and Derbent in 1900 were two milestones for further developments in postal service. The first post delivery between the ports of the Transcaucasus and Iran (Rasht and Astarabad) over the Caspian Sea took place in 1861. Postal communication between Tbilisi and Julfa was established to support transit trade of Iran between 1863–1972. The Azerbaijan Democratic Republic (1918–1920) established the Ministry of Post and Telegraph on October 6, 1918. On March 15, 1919, the interchange of postal items, money orders, valuable letters and parcels were organized between Azerbaijan and Georgia. Post-telegraph relations between Azerbaijan and Iran took place on April 6, 1920. On April 28, 1920, the Red Army invaded Azerbaijan and the country became a part of the Soviet Union as the Azerbaijan Soviet Socialist Republic.

During World War Two, improving the economy and social conditions of people required an increase in postal services. Thus, during that period postal communication networks increased 9 times and reached 524 compared to 1920 and 402 of them or 76.7% were located in the villages.

In 1945, the International Post Expedition was held in Baku. This event was aimed to ensure the movement of international parcels and also their protection and control. In the same year, the length of post-delivery by domestic air transport was 1042 km.

In the 1950s compared to the 1940s, interchange of letters increased 140%, parcels 80%, money orders 237%, periodicals 80%, and the number of post boxes grew to 3000.

In 1955, the total length of post routes was around 8668 km. Delivery capacity by air transportation was 736,1 ton, by sea 4212 ton.

In 1970 compared to 1940, the number of postal facilities increased 3 times and amounted to 1590 (especially in rural areas 1171), number of mail correspondence increased 3 times and consisted 75 million, parcels increased 2 times, periodicals 6,5 times, distance of post routes 3 times (reached 20023 km), number of automobile routes increased 9 times and reached 1705 thousand km. This process is considered as the reduction of horse-wagon routes.

In 1991, with the dissolution of the Soviet Union, "Azerpost" Production Union replaced the former postal system and started to the organization of postal and electrician communications and provide services in Azerbaijan.

"Azerpost" SE as a follower of "Azerpost" PU was founded by order of the Ministry of Communication dated 23.09.1999, #151 "On the continuation of reforms and improvement of a structure in post communication field". Enterprise was founded on the base of "Azerpost" Production Union and became its legal successor.

== Structure of the organization ==
- Sorting Center
- "Azerekspresspost" CU
- Special Communication Center
- Technical Support Center

"Azerpost" SE consisted of 63 post branches, 1537 post offices, and 130 post agencies.

== See also ==
- Azermarka, the company responsible for the production and sale of stamps
- Postage stamps and postal history of Azerbaijan
