= Təzəkənd, Agdam =

Təzəkənd
- Municipality
- Location within Azerbaijan Location within Karabakh Economic Region
- Coordinates: 40°13′N 47°03′E
- Country: Azerbaijan
- Rayon: Agdam

Population
  - Total: 3,659
- Time zone: UTC+4 (AZT)
  - Summer (DST): UTC+5 (AZT)

Təzəkənd (also, Tazakend) is a village and municipality in the Agdam Rayon of Azerbaijan. It has a population of 3,659. The municipality consists of the villages of Təzəkənd, Birinci Dördyol, İkinci Dördyol.
