= International Pharmaceutical Excipients Council =

The logo of IPEC Federation

International Pharmaceutical Excipients Council is a global organization founded in 1991 representing producers, suppliers, and end users of excipients. The body has three divisions in Europe, Japan, and the United States, each of which focuses on local regulations concerning the excipients market, as well as on new research and business practices.

== See also ==
- IFPMA
