= Institute of Permaculture and Ecovillage of the Cerrado =

The Institute of Permaculture and Ecovillage of the Cerrado is an experimental educational design center and international community located on the Cerrado savanna of Brazil. IPEC began on a bare, degraded cattle pasture in 1998 to teach and demonstrate permaculture and to apply this information in the construction of a prototype ecological village, or ecovillage. The community exists on 25 hectares (62 acres) of land and is located in Pirenópolis, in the state of Goiás, central Brazil. IPEC is connected to the national university in Brasília as well as many government ministries, schools and other non-profit organizations.

Ecoversidade is IPEC's educational arm and is dedicated to education for sustainable living.
