= Cəngan, Neftchala =

Cəngan
- Location within Azerbaijan
- Coordinates: 39°33′45″N 49°01′27″E
- Country: Azerbaijan
- Rayon: Neftchala
- Municipality: Ərəbqardaşbəyli
- Time zone: UTC+4 (AZT)
  - Summer (DST): UTC+5 (AZT)

Cəngan (also, Dzhalyan-Sal’yany and Dzhangyan) is a village in the Neftchala Rayon of Azerbaijan. The village forms part of the municipality of Ərəbqardaşbəyli.
