= Birinci Nügədi =

- Municipality
- Location within Azerbaijan
- Coordinates: 41°19′39″N 48°33′59″E
- Country: Azerbaijan
- Rayon: Quba
- Elevation: 571 m (1,873 ft)

Population (2009)
  - Total: 7,768
- Time zone: UTC+4 (AZT)
  - Summer (DST): UTC+5 (AZT)

Birinci Nügədi (also, Birindzhi-Nyugedi, Nyugedi Pervoye, Nyugedi Pervyye, Nyugedy, and Pervyye Nyugedy) is a village and municipality in the Quba Rayon of Azerbaijan.
