= İkinci Dördyol =

Village in Aghdam District, Azerbaijan

Coordinates: 40°15′N 47°06′E

İkinci Dördyol (also, Ikinji Dordyol) is a village in the municipality of Təzəkənd in the Aghdam District of Azerbaijan.
