= Inteligência em Pesquisa e Consultoria Estratégica =

Brazilian institute of market and opinion research

Ipec
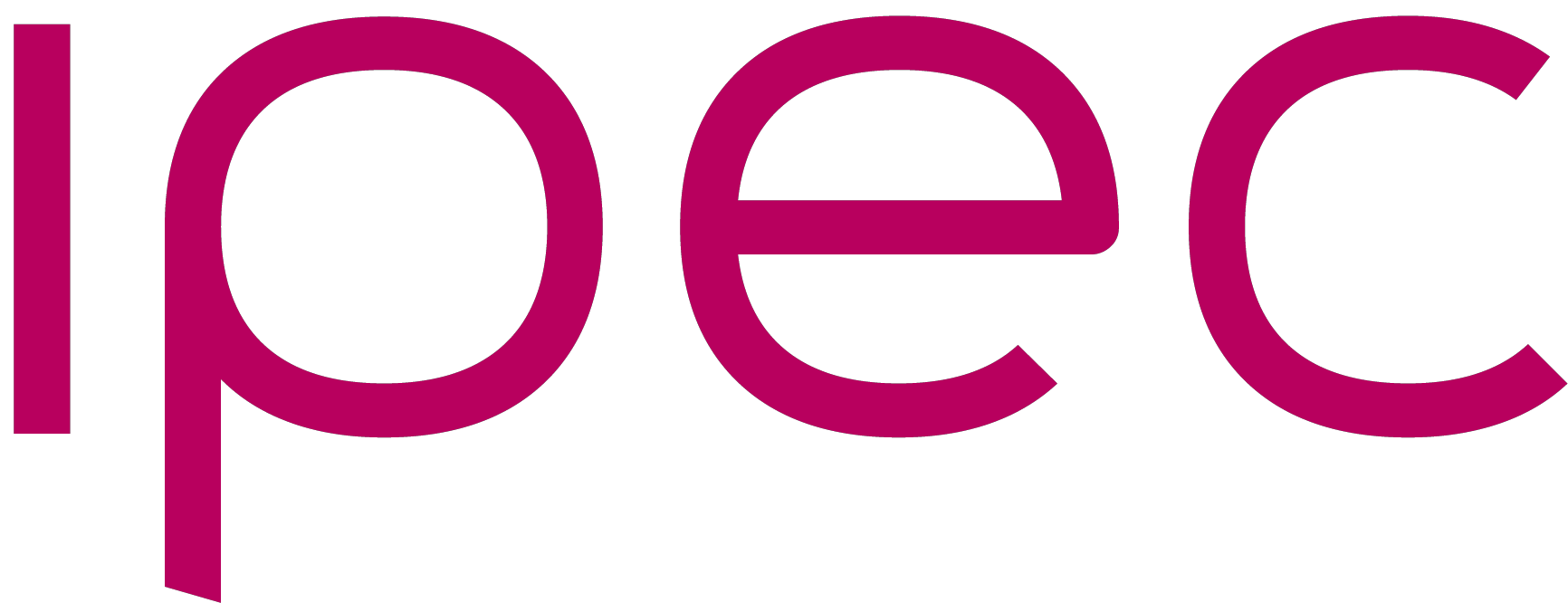
- Logo
- Company type: Private
- Industry: Research
- Predecessor: IBOPE Inteligência
- Founded: 2021
- Founder: Márcia Cavallari
- Headquarters: São Paulo, Brazil
- Area served: Brazil
- Products: Public opinion polling, market research
- Website: ipec-inteligencia.com.br

Inteligência em Pesquisa e Consultoria Estratégica, or Ipec (Intelligence in Research and Strategic Consultancy), is a Brazilian market research and public opinion polling institute founded in January 2021. It was founded by IBOPE's founders and directors after that institute was sold to Kantar Group and ceased its operations in opinion polling.

== History ==
The institute was founded in January 2021 by Márcia Cavallari, former CEO of IBOPE, and other employees who worked there. The IBOPE group, founded in 1942, was sold in 2014 to the British company Kantar Group, which divided the group into two and adopted the name Kantar IBOPE Media, focused on television audience measurement; according to the agreement, the other public opinion, market and voting intention operations were assumed by IBOPE Inteligência, which would retain the right to use the name until early 2021. Among the partners of the new company is Carlos Augusto Montenegro, one of the members of the family that controlled IBOPE since the 1970s.

== Operations ==
Starting operations with a significant part of the professionals and market share of the former IBOPE, Ipec has become notable as one of the main public opinion polling institutes in the country. The institute conducted several voting intention polls during the 2022 Brazilian general election, being the only institute to conduct polls in all states and the Federal District for state and federal elections.

=== Fake news in the 2022 elections ===
During the 2022 elections, the institute was the subject of different fake news articles aimed at discrediting the results of its polls that showed candidate Luiz Inácio Lula da Silva ahead of then-President Jair Bolsonaro in the presidential election. In August, a deepfake video circulated simulating journalist Renata Vasconcellos reporting on a supposed Ipec poll that showed Bolsonaro in the lead. That same month and for several weeks, a fake news article circulated claiming that the institute had the same address as the Lula Institute, which would point to collusion between the institutes to show this candidate ahead in the polls. The fake news was initially spread by Bolsonaro supporter Gustavo Gayer and widely debunked, including by the original spreader, but continued circulating on other channels afterwards.

== See also ==
- IBOPE
- Datafolha
- Ipsos
- Vox Populi
