= Sübh =

- Village
- Location within Azerbaijan
- Country: Azerbaijan
- Rayon: Neftchala
- Time zone: UTC+4 (AZT)
  - Summer (DST): UTC+5 (AZT)

Sübh is a village in the municipality of Birinci Mayak in the Neftchala Rayon of Azerbaijan.
