= Bülent Üçüncü =

Turkish footballer (born 1974)

Personal information
- Date of birth: 13 August 1974 (age 52)
- Place of birth: Istanbul, Turkey
- Height: 1.68 m (5 ft 6 in)
- Position: Attacking midfielder

Senior career*
Years	Team	Apps	(Gls)
- Stade Quimpérois
1994–1999	Lorient	72	(4)
1999–2000	Göztepe	26	(5)
2000–2002	İstanbulspor	52	(8)
2002–2003	Denizlispor	15	(0)
2003–2004	Kayseri Erciyesspor		
2004–2005	Karşıyaka		
2005	Akçaabat Sebatspor		
- * Club domestic league appearances and goals

Bülent Üçüncü (born 13 August 1974) is a Turkish former professional footballer who played as an attacking midfielder.

He acquired French nationality by naturalization on 30 September 1996.

Üçüncü retired from professional football in December 2005 at the age of 31, re-joining Stade Quimpérois in the French amateur-level Division d'Honneur. He had started his senior career at the club.
