= Postage stamps and postal history of Azerbaijan =

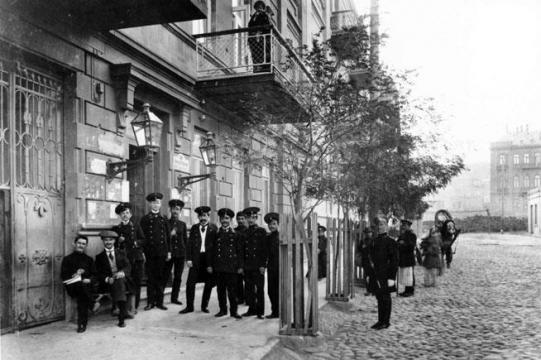
Mail carriers in Baku, 1914

The postage stamps and postal history of Azerbaijan describes the history of postage stamps and postal systems in Azerbaijan, which closely follows the political history of Azerbaijan, from its incorporation to the Russian Empire in 1806, to its briefly obtained independence in 1918, which it lost to the Soviet Union in 1920 and re-acquired in 1991 after the dissolution of the Soviet Union.

== Russian Empire ==
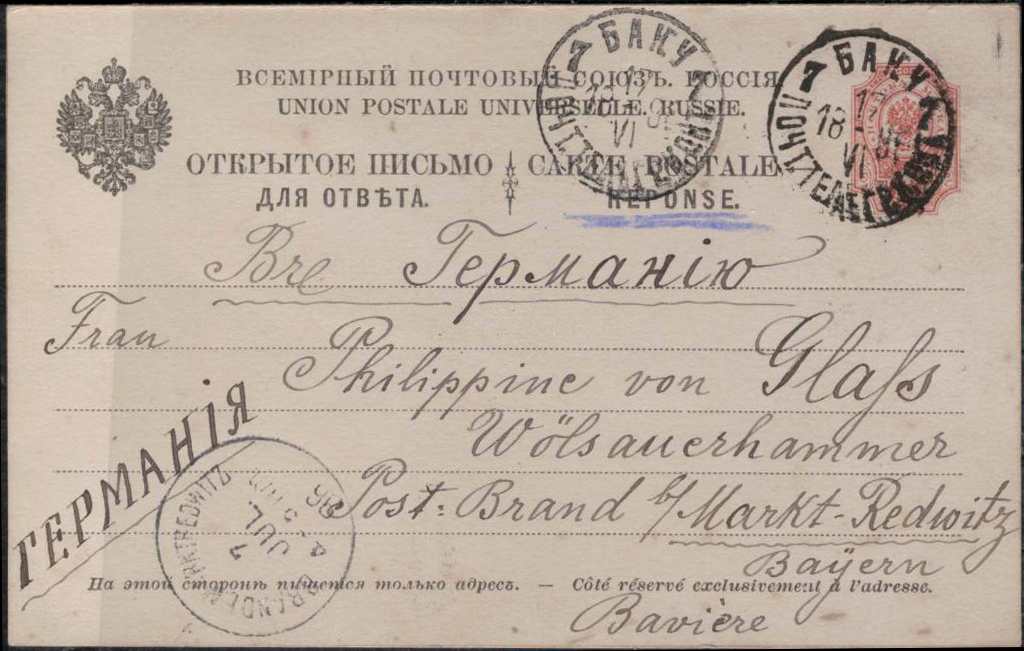
A postcard from Azerbaijan to Germany during the Russian Empire era, 1896

The modern postal service in Azerbaijan began in the early 19th century, when Azerbaijan became a part of the Russian Empire. The first post office was opened in 1818 in Yelizavetpol (now Ganja). The first mail forwarding service was established in 1826 in Baku, followed by the second mail forwarding service which was established in 1828 in Nakhichevan. Post offices were opened Quba, Shusha, Shamakhi, Lankaran, Nukha (now Shaki) and Salyan. Russian Empire postmarks and postage stamps were in use in the territory of Azerbaijan from 1858. The early postmarks were composed of dots in different shapes. Dated postmarks with city names soon followed.

== Azerbaijan Democratic Republic ==
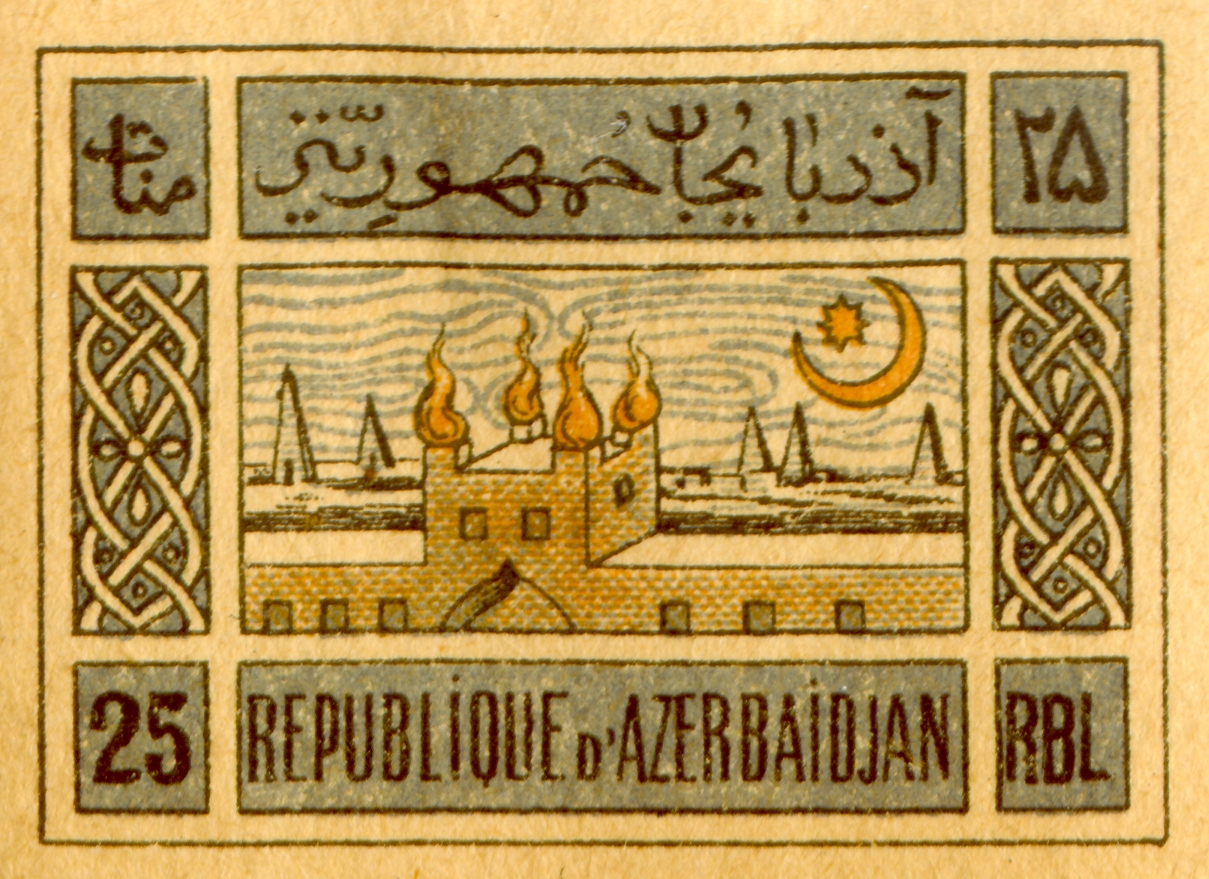
Azerbaijan Democratic Republic stamp, 1919

The first stamps of Azerbaijan were issued in 1919 by the Azerbaijan Democratic Republic and consisted of a set of ten pictorial designs to 50r. There are two distinct printings, a 1919 printing on white paper with whitish gum and a 1920 printing on buff paper with yellow gum or no gum. The first printing is scarcer and forgeries of it exist.

== Azerbaijan Soviet Socialist Republic ==
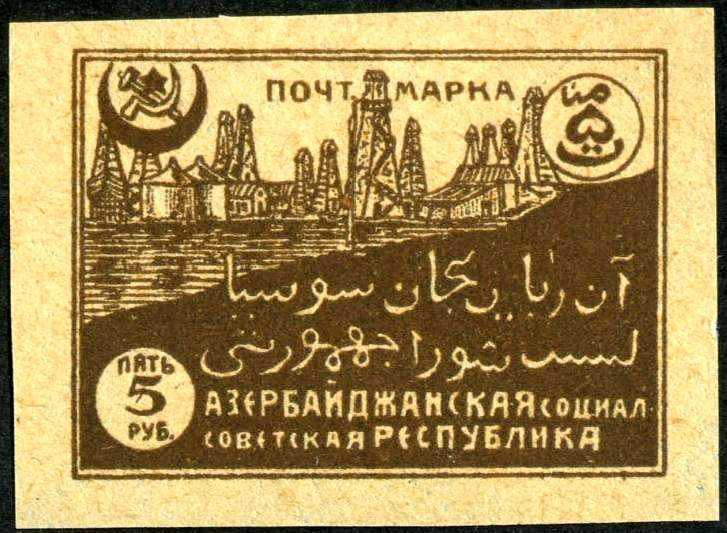
Azerbaijan Soviet Socialist Republic stamp, 1921

On 27 April 1920 the Red Army entered the capital Baku and the Azerbaijan Soviet Socialist Republic (ASSR) was created, which became a part of the Soviet Union (USSR). The first stamps of the ASSR were issued in 1921 and consisted of a set of 15 stamps showing local and political scenes including an oil well and a mosque. Further stamps were issued in 1921 for famine relief and overprints with local control inscriptions in 1922. However the 1923 famine relief stamps of Azerbaijan are bogus, and these were subsequently forged. The republic was periodically recognized in sets of stamps honoring the different parts of the USSR. During the entire Soviet period about 60 stamps with Azerbaijani nationalistic and ethnic topics were issued by the central USSR government itself, featuring prominent figures, buildings, flora, fauna, and other subjects related to Azerbaijan.

== Transcaucasian Socialist Federative Soviet Republic ==
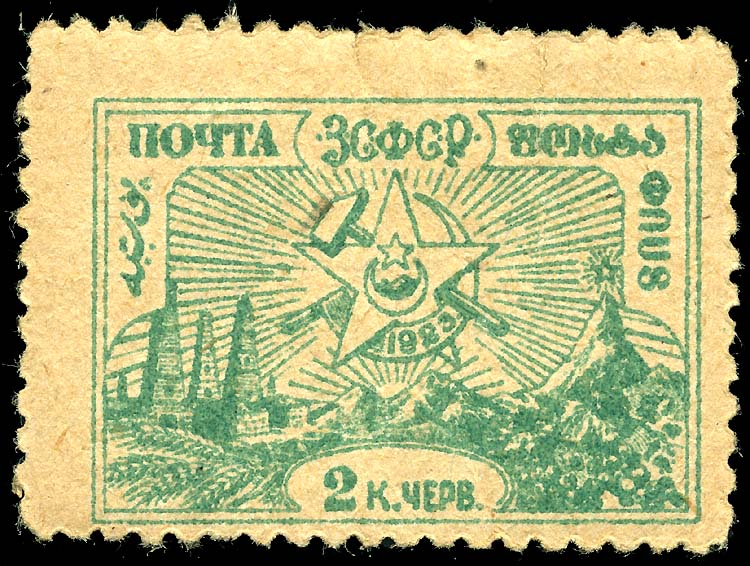
Transcaucasian Socialist Federative Soviet Republic stamp, 1923

On 12 March 1922, Azerbaijan, Armenia and Georgia were federated as the Transcaucasian Socialist Federative Soviet Republic (TSFSR). Azerbaijani stamps were overprinted first in Azeri currency, then Transcaucasian roubles. Overprinted country-wide Soviet stamps were issued in 1923. From 1 October 1923, ASSR stamps were replaced completely by stamps of the TSFSR which were used until the dissolution of the TSFSR and the second refounding of the Azerbaijan Soviet Socialist Republic (ASSR) in 1936. The stamps of the ASSR were issued again along with the country-wide Soviet stamps which were used until the dissolution of the Soviet Union and of the Azerbaijan SSR in 1991.

== Republic of Azerbaijan ==
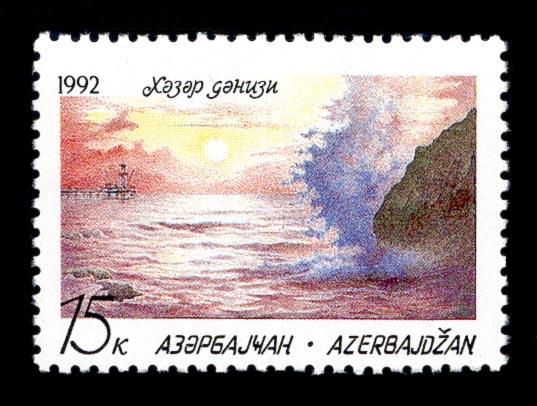
First stamp of the Republic of Azerbaijan, 1992

On 19 November 1990, the Azerbaijan Soviet Socialist Republic was renamed the Republic of Azerbaijan. It became an independent country on 18 August 1991 and its first stamp was issued on 26 March 1992 to mark its independence. Unlike most other ex-Soviet republics, Azerbaijan did not overprint Soviet stamps to meet their postal needs after independence. The national postal service Azərpoçt was founded in 1992, which was restructured in 1999 and which became the national postal operator in 2004. The national postage stamp company Azermarka began functioning in 1992 and is responsible for the production and sale of all Azerbaijani postage stamps. On 1 April 1993, Azerbaijan became a member of the Universal Postal Union. A variety of definitive and commemorative stamps have been produced depicting topical and local subjects. First day covers and postal stationery have also been issued. The first stamps depicting people were issued in 1993. The first person to be featured on a postage stamp after the dissolution of the Soviet Union was Heydar Aliyev, the third President of Azerbaijan. The first stamps to be issued in the new Azerbaijani currency, the manat, that was introduced to replace the Soviet rouble used for the previous issues since independence, appeared in October 1992, after the introduction of the new currency on 15 August 1992. The currency value of the stamps (in manats or in gapiks, the 1/100 division of the manat) varies depending on the year of issue. In 1998, 19 sets of illegal postage stamps, were allegedly issued in Nakhchivan, which depict among others, Diana, Princess of Wales and the British pop group Spice Girls. Consequently, Azerbaijani officials have issued notices to the Universal Postal Union, notifying them about counterfeit stamps on popular thematic subjects issued in their name.

On 27 April 2021 Azermarka was merged with Azərpoçt.

== See also ==
- Azermarka, the company responsible for the production and sale of stamps
- Azərpoçt, the national postal service of Azerbaijan

== References and sources ==
Sources

- Stanley Gibbons Ltd: various catalogues
- Dobin, Manfred (1993). Postmarks of Russian Empire (Pre adhesive period). Standard Kollektion. ISBN 978-5-85-387022-2.
- Rossiter, Stuart & Fowler, John (1991). World History Stamp Atlas (reprint ed.). Black Cat. ISBN 0-7481-0309-0.
