= İkinci Səmədxanlı =

Coordinates: 39°02′N 48°42′E

- Village and Municipality
- Interactive map of İkinci Səmədxanlı
- Country: Azerbaijan
- Rayon: Masally

Population
  - Total: 391
- Time zone: UTC+4 (AZT)
  - Summer (DST): UTC+5 (AZT)

İkinci Səmədxanlı is a village and municipality in the Masally Rayon of Azerbaijan. It has a population of 391.
