= Birinci Varlı =

Coordinates: 39°49′N 49°05′E

Birinci Varlı is a village and municipality in the Salyan Rayon of Azerbaijan. It has a population of 1,069.
