= Şıxlı, Fuzuli =

Şıxlı is a village in the Fuzuli District of Azerbaijan.
