= Ərəbqardaşbəyli, Neftchala =

Ərəbqardaşbəyli is a village and municipality (bələdiyyə) in the Neftchala Rayon of Azerbaijan. It has a population of 1,022. The municipality consists of the villages of Ərəbqardaşbəyli, Bala Surra, and Cəngan.
