= Cəngan, Sabirabad =

Village and municipality in Azerbaijan

Cəngan is a village and municipality in the Sabirabad District of Azerbaijan.
