= Birinci Ərəbcəbirli =

- Location within Azerbaijan
- Coordinates: 40°38′53″N 47°41′27″E
- Country: Azerbaijan
- Rayon: Goychay
- Municipality: Ərəbcəbirli
- Time zone: UTC+4 (AZT)
  - Summer (DST): UTC+5 (AZT)

Birinci Ərəbcəbirli (also, Arabdzhabirli Pervoye and Arab-Dzhabirly Pervoye) is a village in the Goychay Rayon of Azerbaijan. The village forms part of the municipality of Ərəbcəbirli.
