= Birinci Mayak =

- Municipality
- Location within Azerbaijan
- Coordinates: 39°22′53″N 49°20′58″E
- Country: Azerbaijan
- Rayon: Neftchala

Population
  - Total: 1,015
- Time zone: UTC+4 (AZT)
  - Summer (DST): UTC+5 (AZT)

Birinci Mayak (also, Birinci Nömräli Mayak, Pervomayskiy, and Pervyy Mayak) is a village and municipality in the Neftchala Rayon of Azerbaijan. It has a population of 1,015. The municipality consists of the villages of Birinci Mayak and Sübh.
