= Cəngan, Jalilabad =

Cəngan
- Municipality
- Location within Azerbaijan
- Coordinates: 39°10′59″N 48°19′20″E
- Country: Azerbaijan
- Rayon: Jalilabad

Population
  - Total: 585
- Time zone: UTC+4 (AZT)
  - Summer (DST): UTC+5 (AZT)

Cəngan (also known by the name Dzhangyan) is a village and municipality in the Jalilabad Rayon of Azerbaijan. It has a population of 585.
