= Birinci Qaradəmirçi =

- Municipality
- Location within Azerbaijan Location within Karabakh Economic Region
- Coordinates: 40°22′19″N 47°07′52″E
- Country: Azerbaijan
- Rayon: Barda

Population
  - Total: 1,865
- Time zone: UTC+4 (AZT)
  - Summer (DST): UTC+5 (AZT)

Birinci Qaradəmirçi (also, Karadamirchi, Karadamirchi Pervyye, Karademirchi Pervoye, and Karademirchi Pervyye) is a village and municipality in the Barda Rayon of Azerbaijan. It has a population of 1,865.
