= Birinci Mahmudlu =

- Municipality
- Location within Azerbaijan Location within Karabakh Economic Region
- Coordinates: 39°33′11″N 47°34′15″E
- Country: Azerbaijan
- District: Fuzuli

Population
  - Total: 1,091
- Time zone: UTC+4 (AZT)

Birinci Mahmudlu (also, Birindzhi-Makhmudlu, Makhmudlu Pervoye, and Makhmudly Pervyy) is a village and municipality in the Fuzuli District of Azerbaijan. It has a population of 1,091.
