= İkinci İpək =

Village in Azerbaijan

İkinci İpək (Ikinji Ipak) is a village in the Lachin District of Azerbaijan.
