= Birinci Səmədxanlı =

- Municipality
- Location within Azerbaijan
- Coordinates: 39°04′N 48°42′E
- Country: Azerbaijan
- Rayon: Masally

Population
  - Total: 885
- Time zone: UTC+4 (AZT)
  - Summer (DST): UTC+5 (AZT)

Birinci Səmədxanlı (also, Samedkhanly Pervyye and Samit-Khan) is a village and municipality in the Masally Rayon of Azerbaijan. It has a population of 885.
