= Birinci Şıxlı =

- Municipality
- Location within Azerbaijan
- Coordinates: 41°17′05″N 45°09′33″E
- Country: Azerbaijan
- Rayon: Qazakh

Population
  - Total: 3,177
- Time zone: UTC+4 (AZT)
  - Summer (DST): UTC+5 (AZT)

Birinci Şıxlı (also, Birindzhi-Shikhly, Pervyye Shikhly, Shikhili, Shikhly, and Shykhly Pervyye) is a village and municipality in the Qazakh Rayon of Azerbaijan. It has a population of 3,177.
