= Birinci Əlicanlı =

- Municipality
- Location within Azerbaijan
- Coordinates: 40°19′41″N 47°37′59″E
- Country: Azerbaijan
- Rayon: Zardab
- Elevation: 2 m (6.6 ft)

Population
  - Total: 1,143
- Time zone: UTC+4 (AZT)
  - Summer (DST): UTC+5 (AZT)

Birinci Əlicanlı (also, Alidzhanly Pervyye, Alydzhanly Pervoye, Alydzhanly Pervyy, and Birinci Alıncanlı) is a village and municipality in the Zardab Rayon of Azerbaijan. It has a population of 1,143.
