= Birinci Şordəhnə =

- Location within Azerbaijan
- Coordinates: 40°37′29″N 47°32′01″E
- Country: Azerbaijan
- Rayon: Agdash
- Time zone: UTC+4 (AZT)
  - Summer (DST): UTC+5 (AZT)

Birinci Şordəhnə (also, Shordakhna Pervoye, Shordekhna Pervoye, and Shordekhne) is a village in the Agdash Rayon of Azerbaijan.
