= Birinci Dördyol =

- Village
- Location within Azerbaijan
- Coordinates: 40°14′30.5″N 47°04′00.5″E
- Country: Azerbaijan
- Rayon: Agdam
- Municipality: Təzəkənd
- Time zone: UTC+4 (AZT)
  - Summer (DST): UTC+5 (AZT)

Birinci Dördyol is a village in the municipality of Təzəkənd in the Agdam District of Azerbaijan.
