= Birinci Aşıqlı =

- Municipality
- Location within Azerbaijan
- Coordinates: 39°49′09″N 47°40′46″E
- Country: Azerbaijan
- Rayon: Beylagan

Population
  - Total: 1,981
- Time zone: UTC+4 (AZT)
  - Summer (DST): UTC+5 (AZT)

Birinci Aşıqlı (also, Ashykhly Pervoye) is a village and municipality in the Beylagan Rayon of Azerbaijan. It has a population of 1,981.
