= Üçüncü Mahmudlu =

- Location within Azerbaijan Location within Karabakh Economic Region
- Coordinates: 39°34′54″N 47°13′24″E
- Country: Azerbaijan
- District: Fuzuli
- Time zone: UTC+4 (AZT)

Üçüncü Mahmudlu (Uchunju Mahmudlu) is a village in the Fuzuli District of Azerbaijan. It was under the control of Armenian forces of the Nagorno-Karabakh, however, it was recaptured by the Azerbaijan Army on or around November 7, 2020.
