= Birinci İpək =

Village in Azerbaijan

Coordinates: 39°45′N 46°32′E

Birinci İpək (Birinji Ipak) is a village in the Lachin District of Azerbaijan.
