= Salyan District (Azerbaijan) =

District in eastern Azerbaijan

Coordinates: 39°35′36.9″N 48°58′33.5″E

- District
- Map of Azerbaijan showing Salyan District
- Country: Azerbaijan
- Region: Aran
- Established: 8 August 1930
- Capital: Salyan
- Settlements: 51

Government
  - Governor: Sevindik Hatamov

Area
  - Total: 1,600 km^{2} (620 sq mi)

Population (2020)
  - Total: 139,900
  - Density: 87/km^{2} (230/sq mi)
- Time zone: UTC+4 (AZT)
- Postal code: 5200
- Website: salyan-ih.gov.az

Salyan District (Azerbaijani: Salyan rayonu) is one of the 66 districts of Azerbaijan. Located in the east of the country, it belongs to the Shirvan-Salyan Economic Region. The district borders the districts of Bilasuvar, Sabirabad, Hajigabul, Baku, Neftchala, and the city of Shirvan. Its capital and largest city is Salyan. As of 2020, the district had a population of 139,900.

== History ==
Salyan was a large, populated area and attracted the attention of the invaders in the XIII century. The approximate time of settlement is the 15th century. Trade relations of Shirvanshahs with Mughan, Tabriz and Iran were passing through Salyan. For a long time in the XVII-XVII century trade routes with Iran, the North Caucasus, Turkestan and Russia passed through Salyan. Fish and caviar from Salyan were transported to these cities for sale. In the 18th century, silver copper money was minted in the district.

In 1795 Agha Mohammad Khan Qajar attacked Shamakhi and completely ruined Salyan because of the confrontation he showed.

In February 1868, the Javad district was established within the Baku province, including Salyan as an administrative unit. Thus, Salyan transformed into a cultural centre.

At the beginning of the 20th century, 3 small cotton ginning enterprises with a capacity of 3–4 tons, small heating power stations, 4 elementary schools and a library were founded here. At that time in the city, there were 20 small knitting enterprises, 200 shops, 3 caravan-sheds, 5 trading banks, a ship bridge, a post station, a quarantine station and 11 madrasahs.

In the year 1894, the meteorological station was opened in Salyan for the first time in the whole of Southern Russia and the Caucasus.

Salyan was also the centre of trade, which was located on the Silk Road. Back in the II century AD. merchants from China and India, passing through the current Turkmenbashi (Krasnovodsk) along the sea route, passed through the Caspian depression into the Kura River, the lands of all Azerbaijan, as well as the territory of Salyan, crossed the Rioni River in Georgia, then reached the Poti port on the Black Sea, crossed the Black Sea and fell into the Sea of Azov.

Salyan for a long time, was the educational, cultural centre of Mughan. In 1881, the area of the whole city was 800 acres.

Since 1916, Salyan is officially considered a city.

== Etymology ==
Salyan's etymology is of Persian origin. The word "sal" translates from Persian as "year." The origin of this name is explained by the fact that one of the Persian shahs granted a certain Ibrahim Khan, for his services, the right to use the income from this place, which until then was called Mahmudabad, for a year.

According to the assumptions, part of the saloons along with the Avars moved to Azerbaijan. This is indicated by the historian of the XIV century, Hamdullah Gazvi, confirming his words by the fact of the existence of the city of "Abar" on the bank of the river Kura.

== Geography ==
Salyan region is located on the Kura-Araks lowland, in the Mughan plain. The region is located in the southeast of Azerbaijan. Highway and the railway linking all of Azerbaijan with its southern regions, as well as the countries of the Middle East, are situated in this region. One of the main rivers of the country, Kura flows through the territory of the Salyan region. There is the national park "Shirvan" in this district.

Grey-brown, grey-grass, meadow-wetlands, saline soils are spread. The vegetation cover is composed of desert and semi-deserted, mountainous and hilly areas and is rich in mud volcanoes. The main volcanoes are Durovdag, Aghzıbir, Rabbit-Dag, Babazanen, Duzdag, Galmas, Qirivdağ, Miashovdag, Khidirli, Kursangi, Hamam-mountain, Bandovan mud volcanoes. The flora is semidesert and desert type. These are mostly cypress, cypress, wildflower, algae, vulture, blackberries, adjacent, ordinary, winter, Caspian. The sword of the arms, the Russian herd, the aches, the sharp spells, the quails, the sable, the common figs, the rarest species of Hirkan figs have been spread.

=== Climate ===
The dominant climate here is considered a local steppe climate. A small amount of precipitation falls throughout the year. The average annual temperature is 15.2 °C. The average annual rainfall is 288 mm.

== Population ==
According to the State Statistics Committee, as of 2019, the population of the city recorded 138,600 persons, which increased by 25,600 persons (about 22.6 percent) from 113,000 persons in 2000. Of the total population, 69,300 are men and 69,300 are women. In 2018, more than 25.1 percent of the population (about 34,500 persons) consists of young people and teenagers aged 14–29.

Population of regions by the year (at the beginning of the year, thsd. persons)
| Region | 2000 | 2001 | 2002 | 2003 | 2004 | 2005 | 2006 | 2007 | 2008 | 2009 | 2010 | 2011 | 2012 | 2013 | 2014 | 2015 | 2016 | 2017 | 2018 | 2019 | 2020 | 2021 |
|---|---|---|---|---|---|---|---|---|---|---|---|---|---|---|---|---|---|---|---|---|---|---|
| Salyan region | 113,0 | 114,1 | 115,0 | 115,8 | 116,6 | 117,6 | 118,5 | 119,4 | 120,7 | 121,6 | 122,9 | 124,9 | 126,5 | 128,1 | 129,8 | 131,8 | 133,7 | 135,6 | 137,1 | 138,6 | 139,9 | 140,8 |
| urban population | 39,4 | 39,7 | 39,9 | 40,1 | 50,0 | 50,2 | 50,3 | 50,4 | 40,8 | 40,8 | 40,9 | 41,3 | 41,4 | 41,7 | 42,0 | 42,5 | 42,9 | 43,3 | 43,6 | 43,9 | 44,3 | 44,4 |
| rural population | 73,6 | 74,4 | 75,1 | 75,7 | 66,6 | 67,4 | 68,2 | 69,0 | 79,9 | 80,8 | 82,0 | 83,6 | 85,1 | 86,4 | 87,8 | 89,3 | 90,8 | 92,3 | 93,5 | 94,7 | 95,6 | 96,4 |

== Economy ==
The Salyan region is rich in fish. For example, Beluga, sturgeon, stellate sturgeon, salmon, catfish, pike perch. Also, the Salyan region is connected by a post road and a railway. The population of the district is mainly engaged in agriculture. The region is developing grain growing, cotton growing and livestock. Furthermore, melon and vegetables are grown in the area. The population is also engaged in viticulture (table varieties) and gardening.

== Historical monuments ==
In the Salyan district, there are a number of archaeological objects from the Bronze Age to the Early Middle Ages. Among them is the necropolis of Marimly, the necropolis of pitchers' graves in the village of Gursangya, the ruins of ancient settlements in the villages of Nokhudlu and Mahmudabad.

== Points of interests ==
Numerous mud volcanoes of Azerbaijan are situated not far from the regional center. Among which volcano Babazanan attracts local residents with the curative properties of its muds. There is also a reserve "Dashgil" - a place for hunting waterfowl and fishing for kutum, carp and other Caspian fish.

=== Shirvan National Park ===
By the decree of the President of the Republic of Azerbaijan, Heydar Aliyev, on July 5, 2003, the Shirvan National Park of the Republic of Azerbaijan was established for 54373.5 hectares of administrative units of the districts. The main goal of the National Park was to preserve the gazelles entered in the "Red Book" of the Republic of Azerbaijan, conduct ecological monitoring, educate the population from an ecological point of view, create all conditions for the development of tourism and recreation.
