= Júlio César Gomes Moreira =

Brazilian Roman Catholic bishop (born 1972)

The Most Reverend Júlio César Gomes Moreira
- Bishop of Rubiataba-Mozarlândia
- Church: Catholic Church
- Diocese: Rubiataba-Mozarlândia
- Appointed: 8 September 2026
- Predecessor: Adair José Guimarães
- Previous posts: Auxiliary Bishop of Belo Horizonte (2020–2026); Titular Bishop of Thisiduo (2020–2026)

Orders
- Ordination: 6 December 2003
- Consecration: 13 February 2021 by Walmor Oliveira de Azevedo

Personal details
- Born: 18 April 1972 (age 54) Fortaleza, Ceará, Brazil
- Education: University of Brasília; Seminário Maior Nossa Senhora de Fátima
- Motto: In finem dilexit eos
- Coat of arms

Júlio César Gomes Moreira (born 18 April 1972) is a Brazilian Roman Catholic prelate who has served as bishop of Rubiataba-Mozarlândia since 2026. He previously served as an auxiliary bishop of the Archdiocese of Belo Horizonte and as titular bishop of Thisiduo from 2020 to 2026.

== Early life and education ==
Moreira was born in Fortaleza, in the state of Ceará, Brazil, on 18 April 1972. He studied psychology at the University of Brasília from 1993 to 1997 and philosophy and theology at the Seminário Maior Nossa Senhora de Fátima in Brasília from 1997 to 2003. He later specialized in existential analysis and logotherapy, associated with the work of Viktor Frankl.

== Priesthood ==
Moreira was ordained a priest on 6 December 2003 and was incardinated into the Archdiocese of Brasília. From 2004 to 2005 he was parish priest of São José in Brazlândia, Federal District. He served as a formator at the Seminário Maior Nossa Senhora de Fátima from 2006 to 2007 and as rector of the Seminário Propedêutico São José from 2008 to 2010.

From 2011 to 2015, Moreira served in the Archdiocese of Goiânia, where he was rector of the São João Maria Vianney Interdiocesan Seminary and the Santa Cruz Seminary. During this period he also served as parish vicar of Menino Jesus and Santo Hilário and as parish priest of São Leopoldo Mandic.

He was subsequently involved in pastoral ministry in Brasília, including service at the Sanctuary of the Most Blessed Sacrament and as episcopal vicar of the Centro vicariate. From 2017 to 2020 he was parish priest of Nossa Senhora do Rosário de Fátima in Sobradinho and coordinator of priestly ministry in the Archdiocese of Brasília. He also served in the Organization of Seminaries and Institutes of Brazil (OSIB) at national and regional levels.

== Episcopate ==
On 23 December 2020, Pope Francis appointed Moreira auxiliary bishop of the Archdiocese of Belo Horizonte and titular bishop of Thisiduo. His episcopal ordination took place on 13 February 2021 at the Cathedral of Nossa Senhora Aparecida in Brasília. Walmor Oliveira de Azevedo, Archbishop of Belo Horizonte, was the principal consecrator, with Paulo Cezar Costa, Archbishop of Brasília, and Washington Cruz, Archbishop of Goiânia, serving as principal co-consecrators.

As auxiliary bishop of Belo Horizonte, Moreira served in the archdiocese's episcopal administration and pastoral ministry.

=== Bishop of Rubiataba-Mozarlândia ===
On 8 September 2026, Pope Leo XIV appointed Moreira bishop of the Diocese of Rubiataba–Mozarlândia, transferring him from the titular see of Thisiduo and from his office as auxiliary bishop of Belo Horizonte. The appointment made him the fifth diocesan bishop of Rubiataba-Mozarlândia.
