= Alexandre da Sagrada Família =

25th Bishop of Angra

D. Friar Alexandre da Sagrada Família O.F.M.
- Bishop of Angra
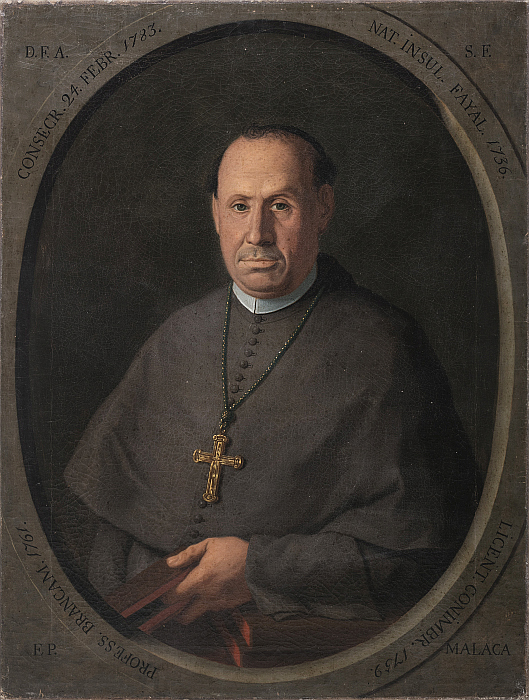
- Church: Sé Cathedral of Angra
- Province: São João Evangalista
- Diocese: Angra
- Appointed: 12 July 1816
- Installed: 4 November 1816
- Term ended: 22 April 1818
- Predecessor: José Pegado de Azevedo
- Successor: Manuel Nicolau de Almeida
- Other post: Bishop of São Paulo de Luanda

Orders
- Ordination: 11 June 1761

Personal details
- Born: Alexandre José da Silva; 22 May 1737 Horta (Azores), Portugal
- Died: 22 April 1818 (aged 80) Angra (Azores), Portugal
- Denomination: Roman Catholic
- Residence: Angra
- Parents: José Ferreira da Silva; Antónia Margarida Garrett
- Occupation: Bishop
- Profession: Theologian/orator

Alexandre da Sagrada Família (Horta, 22 May 1737 – Angra, 22 April 1818), born Alexandre José da Silva Garrett (sometimes referred to as António Ferreira da Silva in biographies), was the 25th Bishop of Angra, governing between 1816 until his death in 1818. The first Bishop born in the Azores (and only repeated in the 20th century by António de Sousa Braga), known as a poet, he was the paternal uncle of Almeida Garrett, and stayed with his parents when he visited Terceira.

== Biography ==
=== Early life ===
Alexandre José da Silva was born in a house along Rua de Santa Ana, in Horta, on the island of Faial, eldest son of ensign José Ferreira da Silva (native of Santa Catarina do Monte Sinai in Lisboa), and Antónia Margarida Garrett (of Madrid). He was baptised by ouvidor Domingos Pereira Cardoso, on 2 June 1737, in the parochial church of Horta, in the presence of his godparents Dr. Alexandre de Moura and his wife, D. Isabel Maria. He was one of ten children, many of whom followed him in ecclesiastical service, including Archdeacon Manuel Inácio da Silva and canon Inácio da Silva Garrett (both clergy at the Sé Cathedral in Angra).

He participated in classes supported by Franciscan friars at the Convent of Santo António in Horta, under the tutelage of teacher and spiritual orientor Friar Ivo da Cruz. He was a diligent and talented student, so much so that the brothers stopped his instruction, claiming "there was no more that they could teach". Alexandre's father died in Horta on 18 May 1753, when he was 16 years old.

Destined for an ecclesiastical career, in 1758 (at 21 years of age) he received his first tonsure, and by 1759 appeared as presbytery in a process, where he testified in Horta.

=== Career ===
On 11 June 1761 he became a novice in the Convent of Nossa Senhora dos Anjos de Brancanes in Setúbal (later garrison and then prison of Brancanes, until its closure in 2007). On 13 June 1762 he began to orate in the convent, taking on the religious name Friar Alexandre da Sagrada Família (sometimes written as Alexandre da Sacra Família).

Apparently self-sufficient, Alexandre José da Silva was an intellectual, recognized for his studies in theology, canonical and civil law, geography and mathematics. He exhibited an extensive scholarship, becoming an orator. But he adopted the trappings of a poor Franciscan friar, seeking alms between the Alentejo and Lisbon.

==== Orator/Intellectual ====
Due to his intellectual skills, in 1776 he was selected to solicit Pope Pius VI, in Rome, for the separation of the Convent of Brancanes from the Franciscan Province of the Algarve. He was able to accomplish this task and the convent, and all other functions of the autonomous seminary, began to depend directly on the General Order.

He became a famous polemicist, including his memorable arguments with Father Bartholomew Brandão, around theological issues raised by the preachings of Father Alexandre Beja on the feast of Corpus Christi in 1776.

He was also a notable humanist and archaic poet, writing under the pseudonym Sílvio, inserting himself within the pseudo-classic French movement of the period. He frequented the "literary evenings" at the home of the 4th Marquess of Alorna, Leonor de Almeida Portugal de Lorena e Lencastre (he was her spiritual counsellor), and who he later persuaded to enter the Convent of Chelas (as a consequence of the Távora affair) for 18 months. During his friendship, he produced a large body of poetry; many of his manuscripts were lost at the time of his death.

Owing to his oratory and learning, on 24 October 1781 he was presented to Queen D. Maria I for the position of Bishop of Malacca and Timor. He was confirmed by bull on 16 December 1782, and was consecrated in the Church of the Trinidade, in Lisbon, on 24 November 1783, during a ceremony presided over by D. António Caetano Maciel Calheiros (Archbishop of Lacedemónia), and with the participation of the Bishop of Macau, D. Alexandre da Silva Pedrosa Guimarães and Bishop of Goiases, Vicente do Espirito Santo.

Yet, even as he was confirmed as the Bishop of Malacca, he did not depart for his post, and remained in Lisbon until he was nominated as Governor and Administrator for the Bishopric of São Paulo de Luanda, with jurisdiction over Angola and region of the Congo. He obtained a papal confirmation by bull on 15 February 1784, and departed for Luanda on 6 April 1784, where he finally assumed the governorship of the diocese.

When he was preparing to receive the transference of the bishopric of the Diocese of Luanda, a conflict with the Captain-General of Angola, José de Almeida e Vasconcelos, 1st Baron of Mossâmedes, put him in opposition to the Portuguese government. As a consequence, the authorities refused his confirmation as prelate to Luanda. Offended, the bishop departed secretly for Lisbon, where stayed at the Convent of Brancanes.

While in exile, he was recognized as a poet and intellectual, and was elected social correspondent of the Academia Real das Ciências de Lisboa (Lisbon Royal Academy of Sciences) in 1791.

D. Alexandre da Sagrada Família was in Brancanes when, in 1808, his was selected by Jean-Andoche Junot to join a Portuguese delegation to France, to salute Napoleon Bonaparte. Demonstrating his courage and patriotism, he refused to participate and recognized the sovereignty of the Prince-Regent.

==== Bishop of Angra ====
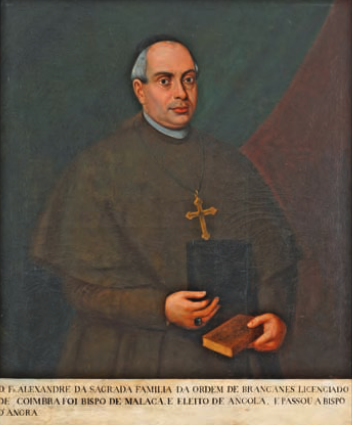
Alexandre da Sagrada Família in his later years, as Bishop of Angra

In the following year, during the Peninsular War, friar Alexandre escaped to the Azores, settling in Angra on the island of Terceira, with his brother António Bernardo da Silva Garrett and his family.

This move began a period of his life where he interacted with his nephew, João Baptista, who would later be known as Almeida Garrett. He was responsible for influencing the young artist, counseling and orienting him into an ecclesiastical life, going as far as soliciting for him a place in the college at the Church of Nossa Senhora da Conceição in Angra. Friar Alexandre strongly influenced his intellectual instruction, providing him with a solid understanding of literature and a taste for the classics, along with conservative ideals which the young intellectual would later reject. Yet, Almeida Garret would always manifest a sincere veneration for his uncle, and dropped many references in his poems during later parts of his life.

Apparently at the request of his brother Antonio Bernardo, who was seeking the appointment of his eldest son (also named Alexander) to Customshouse of Porto, D. Alexander left in 1811 for Rio de Janeiro in order to petition the Prince Regent. It was during his stay in the Corte in Rio de Janeiro that he learned of the death of Bishop José Pegado de Azevedo (then 24th Bishop of Angra), in the Convent of Graça, Ponta Delgada (where he was buried). With the vacancy at the Cathedral of Angra, on 7 January 1812 the Prince Regent presented D. Alexander for the position, requesting the necessary papal confirmation. He returned to Angra in 1813 as designate replacement, but papal confirmation never arrived and he returned to Rio de Janeiro.

Returning the following year to Angra, he discovered the diocesan caretaker in open revolt with the apostolic nuncio, Lorenzo Caleppi, then Archbishop of Nisibi, who wanted to nominate a head vicar. A reputed canon, and bishop designate of the diocese, he was solicited to provide an opinion on the complaint. He responded on 24 July 1813:

This Church, swears it fully belongs to the Military Order of Our Lord Jesus Christ, whose Grandmaster has in it legitimate jurisdiction, per alium exercenda, as spoken by the Jesuits. All the benefits, all offices, flow from the Grandmaster and cannot, without express will and commandment it be abolished, changed, replaced by some other authority. And after various Pontificates confirmed these rights to the Order, who incorporated them into the Crowns of these kingdoms, not even those same Pontificates could, without the offense of those authorities and against the rights of those same Crowns, order and dispose contrarily those offices, benefits and positions of this Church. How could their Nuncio, by a despotic act, even as the same Pontificate could not?

As Sagrada Família was awaiting papal confirmation which was dependent on the influence of the same apostolic nuncio, his impolite response was not left without a response. The papal nuncio delayed his process and directed his agents in the Vatican to cause Sagrada Família's confirmation to be blocked or repealed. Although his efforts were eventually unsuccessful, four uncertain years passed, during which time the post remained vacant, even as the bishop was present on the island. Finally, on 12 July 1816, the long-awaited apostolic letters of confirmation were issued, but still arrived in Angra without the royal Exequatur that normally accompanied these documents. Since they arrived directly, without passing through the Corte in Rio de Janeiro, the bishop maintained his residence situation and the Canon (priest) assumed temporary and spiritual power, as if the position was vacated.

Only four months later, on 4 November 1816, did Alexandre da Sagrada Família become the Bishop of Angra, through his proxy, the canon José Narciso de Mendonça. On 15 December of the same year, at the Church of the Misericórdia of Angra, did solemn ceremonies mark his investiture as the new bishop.

Even at 80 years of age (at the time an exceptional age) he assumed his position with vigor, taking-on many responsibilities in the religious and civil life of the Diocese. One of his first acts was his exhortation of the clerical classes to collect alms in order to maintain the Catholic presence in the Holy Land.

=== Later life ===
With the vacancy of the position of Captain-General, the Bishop held the interim title for the Captaincy-General of the Azore, until the arrival of the successor, Francisco António de Araújo, who was installed in a solemn ceremony on 14 May 1817 at which he assisted.

D. Alexandre da Sagrada Família died on 22 April 1818, at almost 81 years of age, and was buried in the Convent/Church of Santo António dos Capuchos, where he had regularly walked to venerate the image of Our Lady of Release.

== Published work ==
D. Alexandre wrote or published little during his life, but did leave an incomplete manuscript of his public works. Of his known works, one of his acolytes anonymously published Devoção das Dores da Virgem Mãe de Deus (Devotion of Sorrows of the Virgin Mother of God) in 1782, re-edited in 1817. There is also a reference in the Obras Poéticas, by the Marquess of Alorna, that is inserted in a poem of his authorship, entitled Epístola a Alcipe, and signed with the pseudonym Sílvio.

Almeida Garrett affirmed that his uncle did translate the tragedy Merope, by Scipione Maffei, but could not remember if it was published, and the manuscript had since disappeared.

A few of his pastoral writings are still documented, namely the Pastoral do bispo de Angra, dirigida à reverenda vigararia do convento de S. João Evangelista de Ponta Delgada na ilha de S. Miguel (later published in the Investigador Português in 1817) and the Pastorais ao clero da diocese de Angola e Congo (published in the Jornal de Coimbra in 1820).

António Ferreira de Serpa (1865–1939) later inserted the poem Cântico de Moisés in his published work D. Frei Alexandre da Sagrada Família.

The city of Horta later honoured the former Bishop with the establishment of one of its two main squares with the toponymy Largo do Bispo D. Alexandre.
