= Diocese of Luziânia =

Catholic ecclesiastical territory

Diocese of Luziânia Dioecesis Lucianiensis Diocese de Luziânia

Location
- Country: Brazil
- Ecclesiastical province: Brasília
- Metropolitan: Brasília

Statistics
- Area: 16,480 km^{2} (6,360 sq mi)
- Population: Total; Catholics: (as of 2004); 700,000; 500,000 (71.%)

Information
- Rite: Latin Rite
- Established: 29 March 1989 (36 years ago)
- Cathedral: Cathedral of Our Lady of Evangelization in Luziânia

Current leadership
- Pope: Leo XIV
- Bishop: Francisco Agamenilton Damascena
- Metropolitan Archbishop: Sérgio da Rocha

Website
- Website of the Diocese

The Roman Catholic Diocese of Luziânia (Latin: Dioecesis Lucianiensis) is a diocese in the ecclesiastical province of the Metropolitan of Brasília in Brazil.

Its cathedral episcopal see is Catedral Nossa Senhora da Evangelização, dedicated to Our Lady of Evangelization, located in the city of Luziânia, Goiás state.

== History ==
- Established on 29 March 1989 as Diocese of Luziânia, on territories split off from the Diocese of Anápolis, Diocese of Ipameri and Diocese of Uruaçu

== Statistics ==
As per 2015 it pastorally served 639,000 Catholics (78.3% of 815,600 total) on 16,424 km² in 32 parishes and 2 missions with 57 priests (30 diocesan, 27 religious), 4 deacons, 101 lay religious (62 brothers, 39 sisters) and 13 seminarians .

== Bishops ==
(all Roman rite)

=== Episcopal Ordinaries ===
Suffragan Bishops of Luziânia

- Agostinho Januszewicz, O.F.M. Conv. (born Poland) (1989.03.29 – retired 2004.09.15), died 2011
  - Auxiliary Bishop: José Carlos dos Santos, F.D.P. (2001.06.20 – 2002.03.25)
- Afonso Fioreze, C.P. (2004.09.15 – retired 2017.07.12), succeeded as a Coadjutor Bishop of Luziânia (2003.11.05 – 2004.09.15)
- Waldemar Passini Dalbello (2017.07.12 – 2025.02.05); previously Titular Bishop of Membressa (2009.12.30 – 2014.12.03) as Auxiliary Bishop of Archdiocese of Goiania (Brazil) (2009.12.30 – 2014.12.03)and Apostolic Administrator of Archdiocese of Brasília (Brazil) (2011.02.17 – 2011.06.15), Coadjutor Bishop of Luziânia (2014.12.03 – succession 2017.07.12).
- Francisco Agamenilton Damascena (2025.05.28 – present)

=== Coadjutor bishops ===
- Afonso Fioreze, C.P. (2003-2004)
- Waldemar Passini Dalbello (2014-2017)

=== Auxiliary bishops ===
- José Carlos dos Santos, F.D.P. (2001-2002)

== See also ==
- List of Catholic dioceses in Brazil

== Sources and external links ==
- GCatholic.org, with Google satellite photo - data for al sections
- Diocesan website (in Portuguese)
- Catholic Hierarchy
