= João Casimiro Wilk =

Polish-born Brazilian Roman Catholic prelate (1951–2025)

His Excellency João Casimiro Wilk O.F.M. Conv.
- Bishop of Anápolis
- Archdiocese: Goiânia
- Diocese: Anápolis
- Appointed: 9 June 2004
- Term ended: 11 November 2025
- Predecessor: Manuel Pestana Filho
- Successor: Vacant
- Previous post: Bishop of Formosa (1998–2004)

Orders
- Ordination: 24 June 1976
- Consecration: 4 April 1998 by José Freire Falcão, Agostinho Januszewicz and Marian Błażej Kruszyłowicz

Personal details
- Born: 18 September 1951 Seroczyn, Sokołów County, Poland
- Died: 11 November 2025 (aged 74) Anápolis, Goiás, Brazil
- Motto: Ut amor ametur
- Coat of arms

Styles of João Casimiro Wilk
- Reference style: His Excellency; The Most Reverend
- Spoken style: Your Excellency
- Religious style: Bishop

João Casimiro Wilk O.F.M. Conv. (18 September 1951 – 11 November 2025) was a Polish-born Brazilian Roman Catholic prelate. He was bishop of Formosa from 1998 to 2004 and of Anápolis from 2004 until his death. Wilk died on 11 November 2025, at the age of 74.

Catholic Church titles
Preceded by Manuel Pestana Filho	Bishop of Anápolis; 2004–2025	Succeeded by Vacant
Preceded by Victor João Herman José Tielbeek	Bishop of Formosa; 1998–2004	Succeeded by Paulo Roberto Beloto
