= Holy Cross Church, Hospet =

Church in India

Coordinates: 13°4′48″N 74°58′48″E

- Holy Cross Church, Hospet; Igreja da Santa Cruz Hospet
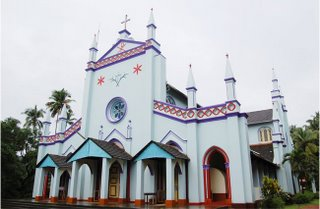
- Igreja da Santa Cruz Hospet (Hospet Church) along with the Monte Mariano Church was among the few churches in South Canara that escaped the demolition drive by Tippu Sultan during the early 1790s
- Former names: Bidrem Church
- Alternative names: Hospet Church, Igreja da Santa Cruz Hospet

General information
- Location: Hosabettu (Hospet), Mangalore, South Canara, India
- Completed: 1761

The Church of Holy Cross of Hospet (Portuguese: Igreja da Santa Cruz Hospet) in Dakshina Kannada, is one of the oldest churches in the Mangalore Diocese of India. Being situated in Hosabettu, it is also known as Hospet Church. This was the only church that escaped the drive for the demolition of churches by Tipu Sultan during the Captivity of Mangalorean Catholics at Seringapatam.

== History ==
This church existed well before the 17th century. According to official documents available to the Mangalore Diocese, the church was established in 1761. Hospet was under the rule of Jain kings for many centuries. Some documents in the Jain literature shows existence of this church even before 1648. At the time of the general demolition of churches by Tippu Sultan, this was the only church that escaped destruction owing to the friendly offices of the Chauta Raja of Moodbidri.

Church of the Holy Cross, formerly known as Bidrem Church. The name Hospet came after the death of Tippu Sultan (1799). The old church was repaired by Fr Jerome Paul Carvalho in 1865. Under the jurisdiction of Goa, 11 vicars had served this church. Fr Jacob Sequeira (1901–1904) was the first diocesan vicar and he was succeeded by Fr Cajetan M. Pereira. The foundation stone for the present church, designed by Fr A. Diamanti sj, was laid on 1 October 1905 by V. Rev. Frachetti sj, the vicar general. Fr Cajetan M. Pereira (1904–1907) began the construction of the church and Fr Rosario P.B. Lewis (1908–1919) completed it and it was blessed on 7 February 1909 by Bishop A. Cavadini sj. This church is one of the first in the diocese built in Cruciform and gothic in style.

The earlier presbytery was built in 1854. Moodbidri, Shirthady, Ferar, Paladka and Taccode parishes are carved out of this parish. The present presbytery was built by Fr Cyprian Coelho in 2000. There are 9 wards in Hospet parish. Around 285 catholic families are living in this parish and total Catholic population is at around 1500. Currently around 40% of populations have migrated to the city of Mumbai and Middle East counties.

Fr Asissi Rebello is the 21St diocesan vicar of the parish.

Hospet, widely known as Hosabettu, is a place with lush greenery and a rich natural landscape. Its scenery features coconut, areca nut, and betel leaf plantations, sprawling rice paddies, and dense forests that once supported abundant wildlife. Tiny lakes, seasonal streams that flow during the rainy season, the chirping of birds, and hillocks are also featured in the area's landscape.

Amidst all this lies a Roman Catholic Gothic style Church built in cruciform, by the name of HOLY CROSS CHURCH HOSABETTU . This church is 41 km north-east of Mangalore, and 6 km from Moodbidri Town. Kuppepadav, Tacode and Moodbidri parishes surround this church. The Hospet Church comes under village Hosabettu. The church is covered with a dense forest. The place is just 46 km from Mangalore International Airport.

This is the first church in the whole of South Canara district to be dedicated to the Holy Cross. Just as it is very difficult to narrate the origin of the place and the people of Hosabettu, so, it is all the more hard to trace the exact date of the beginning of the parish. But it is for sure that the parish has the Portuguese origin. Thus this parish has made its impression on the pages of The Roman Catholic history in South Canara. According to the ancient records The church was called "Bidrem Church". But many also called it as The Hospet Church (Portuguese: Igreja da Santa Cruz Hospet). This is because 'Bidrem' or Moodbidri was famous even in ancient days, owing to the Chouta Raja and his rule as well as numerous Bhasatis which are religious institutions of Jains. Hospet was under the rule of Jain kings for many centuries. The only Catholic institution near Bidrem and the surrounding areas was The Church of Hosabettu. Hence this Church was called as the "Bidrem Church".

History mentions the raids and the devastations of Hyder Ali and Tippu Sultan over the Catholic institutions. It also mentions the torture and killings of the Catholics in South Canara. Soon after the Treaty of Mangalore in 1784 Tippu Sultan gained control of Canara and issued orders to seize The Christians in Canara. He also ordered the destruction of 27 Catholic churches, all beautifully carved with statues depicting various saints. But tradition has it that The Church of Hosabettu was not destroyed by Tippu Sultan. This is because the Catholics of the locality used to cultivate betel leaves and were the main suppliers of the same to the Bidrem Chouta Raja and his officers. These people in turn saved the church and the Catholics from the ravage of Tippu Sultan by not disclosing the existence of the church. Thus this was the only church that escaped the drive for the demolition of churches by Tippu Sultan between the years 1784 to 1799.

According to the church records Rev. Fr. Benedict Reis De Trividad was the first parish priest in 1798. During this time there were hardly any Churches in 'Dakshina Kannada' (South Canara). Hence for many years the jurisdiction of the parish extended over a large area in South Canara. Gurpur River being the southern boundary, Western Ghats were the eastern ones. Chilmby was the dividing line between Karkal Attur Parish and Hosabettu. Kirem, Pezar and Agrar were the other neighbors for the parish. All the rest of the parishes of the neighborhood are of later origin.

Though the arrival of Rev. Fr. Benedict Reis De Trividad in 1798 marks the beginning of the parish, the existence of it can be guaranteed even before 1798. Because, the recent enquiries with the 'Bidrem Jain Bhasati' authorities have revealed the existence of the church prior to 1648. Some documents in the ancient Jain literature in Moodbidri show The Church of Hosabettu as well established before 1648. Secondly, St. Thomas the Apostle of India kindled the light of faith during the first century AD in the Southern Part of India. And the early Franciscan Missionaries later continued the Gospel preached by him in Canara in 1510. Therefore, we presume that the church might have begun soon after 1510 or even before that. But because of the lack of sources available and because of the early records not being maintained, it is really difficult to know the exact beginning and the unknown realities. Hence till date The Alfa or The Genesis of the church remains mysterious and untraceable. Therefore, one has to do nothing but calculate and imagine the long-lost realities.

Since 1798, several daughter churches have been built within The Holy Cross Church Parish. As of 2026, the parish accommodates 294 families in 9 wards.

== Church building ==
Bidrem church building was located on S.N. 75 about 300 yards to the south of the present church building site. It was on the plot presently called 'Bhat'. It is not sure whether there was yet another site originally. The building of the church in 'Bhat' can be more or less located as there is a place which is considered to be a cemetery in which Rev. Fr. Benedict Reis De Trividad believed to have buried. Now there is a cross erected in this area and the place is called the old cemetery.

The church building was erected on S.N. 74-3A. This was a beautiful church with artistic gilt altar. This was to the west of present church building (built in 1909). The sanctuary of the same was made use of as a sacristy till 1932. The Parochial house too was built at the same time as the old church was but in which year the old church and the old parochial house were built and by whom they were built is not known. In 1865 Rev. Fr. Jerome Paul Carvallo repaired this church and made additions to the Sanctuary.

By 1904 the church building was rickety and the restoration was really important. In the two confraternities of the parish called "Church Confraternity" and "Fabrica", there were Rs. 40,000 in cash. Rev. Fr. Cajitan M. Pereira decided to build a new church. Rev. Fr. Diamanthy S.J. drew up the plan for a grand Gothic style church with a cupola in the centre. Then Vicar General, Rev. Dr. E. Fraketti S.J. laid the foundation stone on 1 October 1905. The building work commenced under the supervision of Rev. Fr. A. Diamanthy and Rev. Fr. Giovanni S.J. The foundation and half the superstructure almost drained the coffers of the church.

Rev. Fr. Cajitan M. Pereira began to be worried and was no more able to carry on the work. Msgr. M. P. Colaco took him and was with him at Cordell Church for 3 months. As his health did not improve, he was taken to Fr. Muller's Hospital Kankanadi, Mangalore. Here he died a broken man and his remains were laid to rest at the Leper's Chapel in Kankanady. During this time Fr. Cortie S.J. was helping in the parish work.

Rev. Fr. Rosario P.B. Lewis who succeeded him as the parish priest had to complete the work. He altered the plan in order to reduce the expenditure. The Cupola of the plan was dispensed with and the windows were converted into half Roman in style. He wanted to complete the plan instead of going for style and unnecessary debt. In spite of this he had to borrow Rs. 8000 from Mr. S. L. Mathias of Karkalla. He further raised a loan of Rs. 2,500 locally payable in 3 years time. He repaid the loan locally borrowed before he was transferred. The church building was blessed by The Bishop Rt. Rev. Dr. A. Cavadini S.J. on 7 February 1909 and on the next day Pontifical High Mass was sung.

== Progress ==
Here below we give some details that are available to us, so that we have a better view of the progress of the place and the parish. However the exact chronological order of each event is difficult to describe. Hence we mention main activities that have taken place during the tenure of each priest. Since we have no landed property now, various improvements done there on, are left out (are not available to us too). There was water scarcity near the parish church and practically every parish priest has tried to dig a well and they too will not be mentioned.

Between the years 1919 and 1931 Rev. Fr. J.M.A. Vas built the Triple Porticos to the church and began to build the kitchen cum store house. The out houses of the church were built during the time of Rev. Fr. Albert D'Sa between the years 1931 to 1937. At the same time he improved the flooring of the church as well. In 1937, when Rev. Fr. A. J. Silva arrived, he modified the plan and completed the work of Kitchen cum store house.

In 1950 the much desired pulpit was ordered from St. Joseph's workshop, Jeppu at the cost of Rs. 1000. In 1951 the passages from the parochial house to the church were repaired and the room that was store room so far, was slightly reshaped and was converted into an Office room.

In 1952 and 1953 the two side porticos to the church were constructed. In 1954 the church was given a suitable frontage by constructing steps and side porticos for the protection of the doors. At the same time the statues inside the church were painted. In 1956, the church flooring, the presbytery (lower) portion, the kitchen and the passages were cement plastered at the cost of Rs. 4000. On 28 September 1968 three roofs around the sanctuary of the church were repaired introducing new raptors and reapers.

On 26 November 1969 the front railings of the Sanctuary were removed and the Sanctuary was extended so as to have The Altar made visible to the People. In February 1971 the benches and kneelers were provided to the church at the cost of Rs. 5000. And on 14 February 1973 the altar made out of marble was consecrated by the bishop on the parish feast day in the presence of vast congregation and 20 priests.

On 8 October 1977, lightning struck the front façade of the church. A part of the façade and a portion of the roof got damaged. After this incident, as a safety measure, the church roof was mounted with a lightning rod.

On 25 December 1977 a microphone set was installed in the church. And on 24 June 1979, the church and The school buildings were electrified at the cost of Rs. 13,000. The amount was contributed by the local people. Mr. P.F. Rodrigues, the honorable minister was the inaugurator.

In 1988 the store house that was built years ago was plastered. In 1989, 14 fans along with as many points for the tube light sets were installed in the church building. The cost involved Rs. 17114 from the local people.

== Unique facts ==
- The aerial view of the church from the sky is the exact sign of The Cross, because the church is built in cruciform.
- The church possesses a relic of the True Cross.

== Daughter churches ==
In 1863, some of the parishioners submitted themselves to the jurisdiction of propaganda and built a separate church at Tacode. This was Goa-Verapoly Schism. Though it meant only introduction of 'Propaganda Jurisdiction'. Both parishes had their families intermingled for quite a long time. Hence there was personal Jurisdiction, instead of a territorial one. On 16 February 1887, Indian Hierarchy was introduced. Thus Hosabettu came under the jurisdiction of the Bishop of Mangalore. Local Jurisdiction was introduced in 1914. Thanks to the efforts of His Lordship Bishop Rev. Dr. Perini S. J.

The church at Ferar came into existence in 1912 for the convenience of The Catholic families living there. Vadoor village with about 30 families from the Parish of Hosabettu were ceded to Ferar.

The church at Paladka came into existence in 1913 separating itself from Kirem Parish and about 40 families were handed over to this new parish dedicated to St. Ignatius Loyola.

In Fenchar there was a chapel started by the church of Hosabettu for the people of the locality. This was shifted and formed into Shirthady Parish in 1929, by the decree of Rt. Rev. Dr. V. J. D'souza, the 1 st Manalorean Bishop of the Diocese.

Moodbidri –Alangar Parish dedicated to the Holy Rosary was formed into an independent parish in 1929 with Msgr. Francis D'souza as its parish priest. On 1 October 1958, a plot for the erection of a church at Kuppepadavu was acquired. One acre was donated by Mrs. Matilda C. Pais of Mangalore, in memory of her son who had died and about 4 acres of land was bought paying Rs.1750. Thus the construction of the church building at Kuppepadau commenced. The major part of the building was completed by the end of June 1958 at the cost of Rs. 23,000. Rev. Fr. Abel Coelho who was residing at Hosabettu from 22 March 1958 was put in charge of this parish on 22 August 1958. And thus Kuppepadav was made an independent parish by the decree of Bishop Rt. Rev. Dr. Raymond D'mello from 7 June 1964.

By the decree of Rt. Rev. Dr. Basil S. D'souza, Bishop of Mangalore, Corpus Christi Church, Moodbidri was made an independent parish in April, 1971. A few houses belonging to The Church of Hosabettu were ceded to this new parish.

== Property ==
There is no evidence as to who bought or donated the original property to the church. But it is for sure that the church owned a huge area of property. Patta No.27 of Hosabettu was 'Inam Land' (sort of gift) to The Church of Hosabettu. That is, the church had not to pay land revenue to the government. The assessment was Rs. 37.50 in those days, which was to be 'Tasdik'. The government was thinking of cancelling the 'Tasdik', but thanks to the collector's recommendation the status quo was maintained by the order of the Governor of Madras dated 12 January 1915.

The acquisition of the property commences from 1841. Mr. Savantha is supposed to have borrowed money from the church prior to 1841. He did not repay the loan, instead, he repeatedly borrowed. The church went to the court and the property called 'Savantha Bailu' and 'Biravu' lower portion became a part of the church property.

'Muchur Palke Gadde' and 'Kalpane' were owned by S. Colaco. The church bought these places. A sacristan Surnamed Rosario owned 'Mirni Hithlu'. He mortgaged it to the church and finally he had to sell it.

'Bare Hithlu' and 'Karingana' were too mortgaged to the church and then finally were sold. 'Biravu Moolgheni' property was acquired by Rev. Fr. J.M.A. Vas from Mr. Nagaraj Shetty paying Rs. 800 and incurring an expenditure of Rs. 127. Rev. Fr. J.M.A. Vas bought 3 darkasts of 'Konne Padavu' and 'Bhat' portion from Mr. Joseph Marian Rodrigues. Rev. Fr. A. J. D'Silva acquired the portion belonging to Mr. John D. Rodrigues. A portion belonging to Mr. P.P.F. Rebello was handed over to the church as legacy.

A portion of upper Karingana, Simaun Palke of Maroor and a portion of Bhat belonging to Mr. Marian Rodriguez were bought by Rev. Fr. A. J. D'silva. A portion of Bhat belonging to Mr. Rosario Pinto was ceded to the church as a legacy during the time of Rev. Fr. A. D'sa. He bought 'Dhonds' share of 'Alangar' property.

The rest of the properties were acquired at the time of Rev. Fr. Manuel Salvador Costa, Rev. Fr. Jerome Paul Carvalho and Rev. Fr. Rangel. Rev. Fr. P.B. Lewis acquired the property in S.N.110-1 as a Darkest.

There was a long-standing dispute regarding the Maroor property. This was settled when the neighbor sold his property and the one who bought it did not want the litigation to continue. Darkasts bearing S.N. 141-2, S.N.141-5 and S.N.197-1B were acquired during the time of Rev. Fr. F.M. Pinto. Hosabettu was one of the richest parishes in Mangalore Diocese because of large holdings of landed property. The church used to get 314 'Muras' (one mura equals 40 kg) of rice and Rs. 1150 as Gheni.

The property of the church in Boliyar at Maroor village was made over to Immaculate Conception Church, Kuppepadavu, by a gift deed executed in favor of that church on 30 October 1962. The property used to fetch 65 Muras (one mura equals 40 kg) of rice as annual Gheni.

The property measuring 5.10 acres in S.N. 150-2 of Pranthya village of Moodgbidri was made over to the Apostolic Carmel Sisters of Mangalore for the purpose of erecting a girls' high school at Moodbidri. The gift deed was executed on 13 July 1964.

Finally, the church lost all the properties that were in the hands of tenants as per Karnataka Land Reforms Act 1974. There is still some land that was held as darkest by the church and which was not given to anyone for Gheni. The church gets annuity as per law.

== Disputes ==
The property also invited a number of disputes. The 'Inam Land' held by the church was Pascu Varg. It was a classification in revenue records. The other similar classifications of the time are Ales, Juvaum, Rochi and so on.

In 1882 the Rodrigues family of Hosabettu probably instigated by Mr. Diego Noronha of Karkal (His wife was from Rodrigues family Hosabettu), claimed this 'Inam Land' as theirs. They alleged that Pascu was their ancestor and the property belonged to him and the church had usurped it. They refused to pay the Gheni to the church. So the church filed a case against them and the church won at the first instance. They seem to have stolen the documents from the church archives and hence the church lost in the subsequent appeal. Finally they were debarred from all sacraments. So they approached the Bishop Pagani in 1889 and in the compromise they had to pay only the Tasdik.

There was a court case in acquiring Savantha Bailu property as already mentioned. There was once again a long dispute in court over some encroachment in Maroor property. Besides all these the church had to go to court several times to get the arrears of Gheni.

== Administration ==
The temporalities of the parish were administered by 'Junta'. It was found unwieldy and uncontrollable. Hence, a 'Board System' was introduced since 12 April 1922 by Rt. Rev. Dr. Paul Perini S.J.

Rev. Fr. Rosario Lewis had borrowed Rs. 8000 from Mr. S.L. Mathias to roof the church building. He had to raise a further loan of Rs. 2,500 to plaster the church. In 1919 when he was transferred to Udyavar he paid back Rs. 2500 that he had locally borrowed.

Rev. Fr. J. M. A. Vas who came to Hosabettu to succeed Rev.Fr. Rosario Lewis initially paid back Rs. 2000. The work of constructing Triple Porticos, The Kitchen work, Acquiring of Birau Moolgheni property increased the liability of the church to Rs. 11,500 when he died in July 1931.

Rev. Fr. Albert D' SA who succeeded him in 1931 paid off Rs.5500 by the time he left the parish in May 1937. Rev. Fr. A. J. Silva who succeeded him paid off the entire balance loan and its interest. Besides he spent about Rs. 2000 for the plastering of three facades. He spent Rs. 2000 in buying and improving the properties. He had to spend Rs. 600 for the flood repairs. The interest on loan itself was Rs. 1,100; he left a balance of Rs. 1180 to Rev. Fr. A. M. L. D'souza when he left the parish on 3 June 1945. Such a big parish in those days with so much of annual Gheni had to be in debt for years should speak in volumes. The only work that was undertaken was of construction of the church building.

== School ==
The parish school by the name St. Sebastian Higher Primary School was started towards 1890 probably Rev. Fr. G.E.S. Rangel. It was housed in a building that existed near the northern gate of the church compound. In 1895 the school was sanctioned with the permanent approval by the Government. During the time of the construction of the church building 1905–09 it was blocking the way. So the classes were conducted in the sacristy of the old church. During the time of Rev. Fr. A. D'sa the strength of the students rose from 45 to 120. The Sanctuary which was used as the sacristy to the new church so far was now shifted to a room within the new church. And the sanctuary of the old church as well as its sacristy formed the school building. But this place lacked proper ventilation and light.

On 6 September 1940, Rt. Rev. Dr. V.R. Fernandez permitted Rev. Fr. A.J. Silva to demolish The Old Sacristy and use the material to build The school building without using the church funds. He changed the school site and thus in Oct, 1940 the work of the building was begun. The local people contributed little free labor and Rs. 30 in cash. Fr. A.J. Silva spent Rs. 820 from personal resources. And thus the school building was inaugurated on Easter Monday 1941.

The school was upgraded into higher primary school on 1 June 1950. A block forming the shape of the building into 'L' shape was added at the cost of 4,000 from the church funds by Rev. Fr. John G. Pinto. The length of the additional building was about 100 feet. In the years 1986 and 1987 under the leadership of Rev. Fr. Harold C. D'souza, works of repairs to the school building and construction of a new stage were undertaken. Thus on 25 October 1987 Rev. Fr. Lawrence C. D'souza, Secretary of Catholic Board of Education inaugurated the school-cum-stage building after the Sunday morning Mass.

== Post office ==
For years, a room in the corner of the old Parochial House was used as the Post Office. In 1988 Rev. Fr. Harold Cyril D'sousa built a building that comprised a post office, shop and a bus waiting shelter for the commuters.

== Parochial house ==
It is not known in which year the old Parochial house was built. But it is believed to have built in the same year as the old church was. Since the old Parochial House was rickety, Rev. Fr. Cyprian Coelho planned to build a new one and started the work immediately. On 30 January 2000, Rt. Rev. Dr. Aloysius Paul D'souza inaugurated the new Parochial House. Since Rev. Fr. Cyprian Coelho was transferred to Rosario Cathedral, Rev. Fr. Alban D'souza completed the remaining work of the new Parochial house by 30 November 2002. This included flooring and the completion of the first floor.

== Arc ==
The road running from the church to the post office was tarred in 1993. In 2001, on the occasion of its silver jubilee, The I.C.Y.M. Hosabettu built an arc on this church road near the post office. Thus on 29 April 2001, His Lordship, Rt. Rev. Dr. A.P. D'sousa, officially inaugurated this memorial (The Arc).

== Convent ==
During the time of Rev. Fr. Albert Menezes in 1985, it was decided to get some nuns to the parish of Hosabettu in order to improve the standard of the school. But the plan remained only as the parish council resolution since Rev. Fr. Albert Menezes had a transfer order to some other parish. In 1996 Str. Malvina Emidia Debona travelled all the way from Brazil to India to find a suitable place to erect a convent. She landed in Tamil Nadu and lived there for about a year and then moved to Mangalore. In November, 1997 she came to Hosabettu and met Rev. Fr. Cyprian Coelho and expressed the intention of her travel. After the matter was discussed in the parish general meeting, the parishioners promised to donate them a portion of the land behind the St. Sebastian Higher Primary School. Initially Str. Malvina E. Debona stayed in the house offered by Mr. Jerome Elias Goveas for about three months. In 1998 they moved to a room in the old Parochial house building. Thus the nuns stayed there till the building work of the Convent completed. Hence The Benedictine Sisters of Divine Providence erected the convent and on 29 May 1999 The Bishop inaugurated and blessed it officially. For more details kindly log on

== Community hall ==
Under the leadership of Rev. Fr. Alban D'souza, it was planned to have a community hall for the convenience of the parishioners. On 10 June 2007 The Vicar General Rev. Fr. Denis Moras Prabhu laid the foundation stone for a long desired new parish hall. It is situated on the purchased land in front of the church. On 17 April 2009 the new community hall was inaugurated by the Bishop Rt. Rev. Dr. Aloysius Paul D'souza

== See also ==
- Mangalorean Catholics
