= Bisca (bishopric) =

Bisica was a civitas of Roman North Africa, tentatively identified with ruins at Bijga in today's Tunisia.

== Bishopric ==
Bisca was the seat of an ancient episcopal see of the Roman province of Proconsular Africa, and a suffragan of the Bishop of Carthage.

There are two documented bishops of this site.

- Among the bishops present at the Carthage conference of 411, participated Felix episcopus Visicensis, who declared that he had no Donatist competitors in his diocese.
- Valentinianus who called himself gratia Dei episcopus sanctae ecclesiae Visicensis, was one of the signers of the letter addressed by the bishops of the late antiquity province of Byzacena in 646 to the patriarch Paul of Constantinople.

Today Bisica survives as a titular bishopric and the current titular bishop is Andrew Harmon Cozzens, auxiliary bishop of Saint Paul and Minneapolis.

== Bishops ==
- Felix (mentioned in 411)
- Valentinian (mentioned in 646)
- Manuel Borras Ferré † (19 April 1934 - 12 August 1936)
- Francis Xavier Zhao Zhen-sheng, (2 December 1937 - 11 April 1946)
- Francisco Prada Carrera, (3 September 1946 - 17 January 1957)
- Walter William Curtis (June 27, 1957 - September 23, 1961)
- Francis Edward Hyland (11 October 1961 - 31 January 1968)
- Jayme Henrique Chemello (11 February 1969 - 1 September 1977)
- Gustavo Girón Higuita, O.C.D. (8 February 1990 - 29 October 1999)
- Jan Franciszek Wątroba (20 April 2000 - 14 June 2013)
- Andrew Harmon Cozzens, (11 October 2013 - current)
