= Aedinia gens =

Obscure plebeian family of ancient Rome

The gens Aedinia, occasionally found as Haedinia or as Edinia, was an obscure plebeian family of ancient Rome. No members of this gens are mentioned by Roman writers, but a number are known from inscriptions. A few held minor magistracies, or were locally important, and by the third century some were of senatorial rank. A Marcus Aedinius Julianus of this period was governor of Gallia Lugdunensis, and later praetorian prefect.

== Origin ==
The nomen Aedinius is primarily attested in Roman Africa, though there are four Aedinii found in Rome, and three Aedinii attested in Volcei in Lucania. The classicist Benet Salway notes that, in the same area—that being, Lucania—there is also a gens Haedinia attested, which Schulze regarded as an orthographic variation of Aedinius. The name aíífineís has been uncovered in one Oscan inscription, which has been etymologically connected to the nomen Aedinius, though this theory is problematic given that the Aedinii are primarily attested in Africa. Moreover, it is possible that the Oscan name instead ought to be equated with a putative Latin *Aefinius. Carl Darling Buck, who does accept the connection with the Oscan word, suggests a possible further etymological relationship with Latin aedēs ("temple, shrine"). More specifically, the Thesaurus Linguae Latinae suggests that the term is a derivative of Aedius, another nomen gentilicium.

== Praenomina ==
The only praenomina found among the Aedinii known from epigraphy are Lucius, Gaius, Quintus, Marcus, and Publius, all of which were among the most common names at all periods of Roman history.

== Members ==
This list includes abbreviated praenomina. For an explanation of this practice, see filiation.

- Lucius Haedinius L. f. Rufus, one of the duumvirs at Volcei in Lucania, named in an dedicatory inscription dating from the late first century BC, or the first half of the first century AD.
- Lucius Aedinius Rogatus, a cavalryman in the sixth cohort of the Praetorian Guard at Rome, serving in the century of Marcianus, was buried at Rome, aged twenty-nine, having served for nine years, in a tomb dating from the latter half of the first century, or the early part of the second.
- Lucius Haedinius, named in an inscription mentioning the municipal officers of a city near the site of modern San Gregorio Magno, formerly part of Lucania, dating between the latter half of the first century, and the end of the second.
- Aedinius, named in a list of members of the carpenters' guild at Rome, in an inscription dating from the middle portion of the first century.
- Aedinia Lampas, together with her husband, Gaius Vibius Eutychus, dedicated a tomb at Rome, dating between the latter half of the first century, and the end of the second, for their son, Gaius Vibius Fortunatus, aged two years, twenty-two days.
- Lucius Haedinius Charidemus, made an offering at Norba in Latium, dated from the late first or early second century.
- Edinia Hospita, buried in a second-century tomb at Castellum Celtianum in Numidia, aged sixty-five.
- Gaius Edinius Martialis, buried in a second-century tomb at Castellum Celtianum, aged sixty.
- Lucius Haedinius L. f. Sanius Marcellus, aedile, duumvir, and quaestor, honored at Volcei with a second-century monument dedicated by his grandchildren, Marcus Vaonius, Haedinius Sanius Lucanus, and Vaonia Sania Marcella.
- Edinia Fortunata, (Note: The existence of this individual is tentative, for the actual inscription reads "Candiediniae Fortuna[tae]," which could be interpreted as referring to an individual named Candiedinia Fortunata. However, the classicist John McCaul argues that this reading is likely inaccurate, on the basis that the name Candiedinia would supposedly be an otherwise unattested hapax. Alternatively, McCaul proposes that the individual is instead named Edinia Fortunata, with the segment cadi being explained as an inflected form of cadus ("bottle, jar, jug") that refers to a type of receptacle for the deceased. To explain the form Ediniae instead of Aediniae, McCaul adduces the common substitution of A for E. However, there are in fact, other texts with the name Candidinius, and the word Candiedo is also attested as a name local name for Jupiter. For this reason, the current standard rendition of the text endorsed by Roman Inscriptions of Britain reads "Candiediniae Fortuna[tae].") buried in a second- or third-century tomb at the site of modern Adel, formerly part of Britannia.
- Quintus Aedinius Gracilis, a native of Utica in Africa Proconsularis. In AD 157, during the reign of Antoninus Pius, he was a soldier in the Legio II Traiana Fortis, serving in the century of Sempronius Geminus, stationed at Nicopolis in Egypt.
- Aedinius Pan[...], named in a dedicatory inscription from the site of modern Menaâ, formerly part of Numidia, dating from about AD 171.
- Aedinia Amanda, buried at Volcei, in a tomb built by her father, Aedinius Pretiosus, dating between the late second century and the end of the third.
- Lucius Aedinius Pretiosus, buried at Volcei, in a tomb built by his son and namesake, Aedinius Pretiosus, dating between the late second century, and the end of the third.
- (Lucius) Aedinius Pretiosus, dedicated a tomb at Volcei, dating between the late second century and the end of the third, for his father, Lucius Aedinius Pretiosus. He is probably the Aedinius Pretiosus who dedicated another tomb at Volcei for Aedinia Amanda.
- Quintus Aedinius Faustus, a soldier serving in fifth cohort of the vigiles at Rome, in the century of Antullus, early in the third century.
- Edinia Regilla, buried at Ammaedara in Africa Proconsularis. In the same place is the third-century tomb of Titus Lartius Vegetus, aged eighty, along with a Julia Quintulla, aged sixty, and Titus Lartius Pudens, aged forty-two.
- Marcus Aedinius Julianus, a man of senatorial rank, was one of the patrons of Canusium in Apulia in AD 223. He may be the same Marcus Aedinius Julianus who was governor of Gallia Lugdunensis.
- Marcus Aedinius Julianus, formerly governor of Gallia Lugdunensis, and later praetorian prefect, was one of those honored in an inscription from Aragenua in Gallia Lugdunensis, known as the Marble of Thorigny, dating from AD 238.
- Publius Aedinius Urbanus, together with Lucius Lollius Felix and Marcus Alfius Januarius, made an offering to Hercules at Setifis in Mauretania Caesariensis, dating from AD 241.
- Aedinia Valeria, together with her sons, Julius Principinus and Julius Commodus, dedicated a monument to her husband, Gaius Julius Honorius, a priest at Setifis, who died the day before the Nones of October, (Note: October 6.) AD 311, aged forty-two.

=== Undated Aedinii ===
- Aedinia, together with her husband, Nicius Maximus, dedicated a tomb at Calama in Numidia for their son, Nicius Clemens, aged twenty-three.
- Publius Aedinius, the father of Aedinia Sperata, a woman buried at Thibilis in Numidia.
- Edinia Candida, buried at Bulla Regia in Africa Proconsularis, aged nineteen. An Axilia Nina, aged seventy-five, and at least two other persons are buried in the same place.
- Lucius Aedinius Citinus, buried at Castellum Elefantum in Numidia, aged thirty.
- Aedinius Crescens, buried at Thubursicum in Numidia, aged twenty-one.
- Gaius Aedinius Crescens, buried at Castellum Phuensium in Numidia, aged sixty.
- Quintus Aedinius Crescens, also called "Burca", buried at Thubursicum, alongside his wife, Lucia Saturnina, aged sixty.
- Aedinius Felix, named in the funerary inscription of Gaius Aedinius Repentinus at Bisica Lucana in Africa Proconsularis.
- Edinius Felix, veteran of an unspecified Roman legion, was buried at Lambaesis in Numidia, aged fifty-five, with a monument dedicated by his wife, Cornificia Victoria.
- Quintus Aedinius Felix, dedicated a tomb at Lambaesis for his son, Quintus Aedinius Fortunatus.
- (Gaius Aedinius) Felix Sterceianus, dedicated a tomb at Thibica in Africa Proconsularis for his son, Gaius Aedinius Sterceianus.
- Gaius Aedinius C. f. (C. n.) Felix Renatus Sterceianus, the son of Gaius Aedinius Sterceianus and Felicula Sterceia, and grandson of Felix Sterceianus, was buried at Thibica.
- Quintus Aedinius Festus, buried at Thubursicum, aged sixty-five. His wife may have been Junia Bona, buried in the same place with a monument dedicated by her husband.
- Edinia L. f. Flora, buried at Rome, aged fifty years, sixteen days, in a tomb dedicated by her husband, Gaius Clodius Nectareus.
- Edinia Fl[.]ta, buried at Bulla Regia in Africa Proconsularis, aged twenty-nine years, ten months.
- Quintus Aedinius Q. f. Fortunatus, a soldier in the Legio III Augusta, was buried at Lambaesis, aged thirty, in a tomb dedicated by his father, Quintus Aedinius Felix.
- Gaius Aedinius Gloriosus, buried at Castellum Phuensium, aged twenty-five.
- Edinius Honoratus, buried at Thubursicum, aged forty-one.
- Aedinia Julia, buried at Cirta in Numidia, aged forty-five.
- Aedinia P. f. Lucilla, buried at Thibilis, aged twenty.
- Quintus Aedinius Matutinus, buried at Thibilis, aged forty-one.
- Aedinius Mensor, buried at Castellum Phuensium, aged thirty-five.
- Edinius Messor, buried at Castellum Elefantum, aged sixty-one.
- Edinia Nampamina, buried at Uchi Maius in Africa Proconsularis, aged fifty-five.
- Marcus Aedinius Qetus, buried at Castellum Elefantum, aged nineteen.
- Gaius Aedinius Repentinus, buried at Bisica Lucana in Africa Proconsularis, aged twenty-five An Aedinius Felix is named in the inscription.
- Edinius Restutus, buried at the site of modern Doucen, formerly part of Numidia, aged fifty.
- Aedinia Rogata, buried at Thubursicum, aged sixty, alongside her husband, Lucius, the son of Gaetulicus, aged ninety.
- Edinia Rogata, the daughter of Amozcuar, buried at Mididi in Africa Proconsularis, aged forty, alongside Lucius Ef[...] Firmulus, aged fifty-one.
- Aedinia C. f. (C. n.) Rufa, the daughter of Gaius Aedinius Sterceianus and Felicula Sterceia, and granddaughter of Felix Sterceianus, buried at Thibica.
- Marcus Edinius Rusticus, buried at the site of modern Mechta Ouled Zerara, formerly part of Numidia, aged seventy-one.
- Haedinius Salvius, named in an inscription from Rome, along with Maria Tyrannis.
- Lucius Aedinius L. f. Saturnius, buried at Sicca Veneria in Africa Proconsularis, aged eighty-three.
- Aedinia P. f. Sperata, buried at Thibilis, aged thirty-one.
- Gaius Aedinius (C. f.) Sterceianus, the husband of Felicula Sterceia, and father of Gaius Aedinius Felix Renatus Sterceianus and Aedinia Rufa, was buried at Thibica, aged thirty-five years, two months, ten days, and one hour, in a tomb dedicated by his father, Felix Sterceianus.
- Aedinia Thelge, dedicated a tomb at Rome for her husband, Sextus Nonius Herma.
- Publius Aedinius Valens, buried at Thigillava in Numidia, aged one hundred, along with an Attia Lucia, perhaps his wife, aged ninety-five.
- Clodia Aedinia, buried at Castellum Elefantum, aged sixteen and a half.

== See also ==
- List of Roman gentes
