= Diocese of Rubiataba–Mozarlândia =

Catholic ecclesiastical territory

Diocese of Rubiataba–Mozarlândia Dioecesis Rubiatabensis-Mozarlandensis

Catholic

Location
- Country: Brazil
- Ecclesiastical province: Goiânia

Statistics
- Area: 26,797 km^{2} (10,346 sq mi)
- Population: Total; Catholics: (as of 2004); 105,550; 84,835 (80.4%)

Information
- Rite: Latin Rite
- Established: 11 October 1966 (60 years ago)
- Cathedral: Catedral Nossa Senhora da Glória, Rubiataba
- Co-cathedral: Co-Catedral Nossa Senhora do Perpétuo Socorro, Mozarlândia

Current leadership
- Pope: Leo XIV
- Bishop: Júlio César Gomes Moreira
- Bishops emeritus: José Carlos de Oliveira, C.Ss.R.

The Roman Catholic Diocese of Rubiataba–Mozarlândia (Latin: Dioecesis Rubiatabensis-Mozarlandensis) is a diocese located in the cities of Rubiataba and Mozarlândia in the ecclesiastical province of Goiânia in Brazil.

== History ==
On 11 October 1966, Pope Paul VI established the Diocese of Rubiataba–Mozarlândia as the Territorial Prelature of Rubiataba from the Diocese of Goiás and Diocese of Uruaçu. Blessed John Paul II renamed the prelature as the Territorial Prelature of Rubiataba–Mozarlândia on 18 April 1979. On 16 October of the same year the prelature was elevated to a diocese.

== Leadership ==
- Prelates of Rubiataba (Roman Rite)
  - Bishop Juvenal Roriz, C.Ss.R. (1966.10.27 – 1978.05.05), appointed Archbishop of Juiz de Fora, Minas Gerais
- Prelates of Rubiataba – Mozarlândia (Roman Rite)
  - Bishop José Carlos de Oliveira, C.Ss.R. (1979.09.14 – 1979.10.16)
- Bishops of Rubiataba–Mozarlândia (Roman rite)
  - Bishop José Carlos de Oliveira, C.Ss.R. (1979.10.16 – 2008.02.27)
  - Bishop Adair José Guimarães (2008.02.27 – 2019.02.27), appointed Bishop of Formosa, Goias
  - Bishop Francisco Agamenilton Damascena (2020 – 2025), appointed Bishop of Luziânia
  - Bishop Júlio César Gomes Moreira (since 2026.09.08)
