= Diocese of Formosa, Brazil =

Catholic ecclesiastical territory

Coordinates: 15.5451°S 47.3372°W

Diocese of Formosa Dioecesis Formosensis Diocese de Formosa
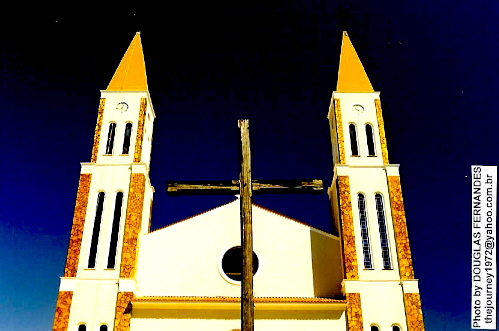
- Cathedral of Our Lady of the Immaculate Conception

Location
- Country: Brazil
- Ecclesiastical province: Brasília
- Metropolitan: Brasília

Statistics
- Area: 47,604 km^{2} (18,380 sq mi)
- Population: Total; Catholics: (as of 2016); 366,900; 262,100 (71.4%)

Information
- Rite: Latin Rite
- Established: 26 March 1956 (70 years ago)
- Cathedral: Cathedral of the Immaculate Conception in Formosa, Goiás

Current leadership
- Pope: Leo XIV
- Bishop: Adair José Guimarães
- Metropolitan Archbishop: Paulo Cezar Costa
- Bishops emeritus: José Ronaldo Ribeiro

The Roman Catholic Diocese of Formosa (Latin: Dioecesis Formosensis) is a Latin suffragan diocese in the ecclesiastical province of Brasília in central Brazil.

Its cathedral episcopal see is Catedral Nossa Senhora da Imaculada Conceição, dedicated to Our Lady of the Immaculate Conception, in the city of Formosa, in the state of Goiás, central Brazil.

== History ==
- Established on March 26, 1956, as the Territorial Prelature of Formosa, on territory split off from the then Archdiocese of Goiás (at the same time demoted to a suffragan itself) and from the suppressed Territorial Prelature of São José de Alto Tocantins
- Promoted on October 16, 1979, as the Diocese of Formosa.

== Statistics ==
As per 2014, it pastorally serves 256,900 Catholics (73.5% of 349,500 total) on 47,604 km^{2} in 27 parishes and 240 missions with 37 priests (diocesan), 52 lay religious (4 brothers, 48 sisters) and 14 seminarians.

== Bishops ==
(all Roman rite)

== Ordinaries ==
Bishop-Prelates of Formosa

- Victor João Herman José Tielbeek, Picpus Fathers (SS.CC.) (February 4, 1961 - October 16, 1979 see below), Titular Bishop of Tipasa in Numidia (1961.02.04 – 1978.05.26), born 1919.08.16 in the Netherlands

Suffragan Bishops of Formosa

- Victor João Herman José Tielbeek, SS.CC. (see above October 16, 1979 - death December 24, 1997)
- João Casimiro Wilk, O.F.M. Conv. (January 28, 1998 - June 9, 2006), transferred Bishop of Anápolis (Brazil) (2004.06.09 – ...), born Poland 1951.09.18
- Paulo Roberto Beloto (November 16, 2005 – 2013.10.23), first Brazilian incumbent; transferred Bishop of Franca (Brazil) (2013.10.23 – ...)
- José Ronaldo Ribeiro (2014.09.24 – 2018.09.12), previously Bishop of Janaúba (Brazil) (2007.06.06 – 2014.09.24); retired
- Adair José Guimarães (2019.02.27 -

=== Another priest of this diocese who became bishop ===
- Dilmo Franco de Campos, appointed Auxiliary Bishop of Anápolis, Goias in 2019

== See also ==
- List of Catholic dioceses in Brazil
- namesame Roman Catholic Diocese of Formosa, Argentina

== Sources and external links ==
- GCatholic.org
- Catholic Hierarchy
- Diocese website (Portuguese)
