= Territorial Prelature of Bananal =

Former Catholic jurisdiction in Brazil (1924-1956)

See Bananal for namesakes

The Territorial Prelature of Bananal was a short-lived Latin Church jurisdiction of the Catholic Church in Brazil from 1924 until 1956.

== History ==
Established on 1924.07.04 as Territorial Prelature of Bananal, named after the Microregion of Bananal (in São Paulo state), where its territory was split off from the Diocese of Porto Nacional.

Suppressed on 1956.03.26, its territory being reassigned to the Diocese of Goiás, to which its last Prelate was transferred and promoted, and to establish the Territorial Prelature of Cristalândia.

== Ordinaries ==
It was initially vacant, with a single Apostolic Administrator :

- Father Francesco Ozamiz Corta, Claretians (C.M.F.) (1926 – 1930), no other episcopal office; later Apostolic Administrator of the (still later suppressed) Territorial Prelature of São José de Alto Tocantins (1936 – 1937).

Its only proper episcopal Bishop-Prelate of Bananal was :

- Cândido Bento Maria Penso, Dominican Order (O.P.) (1947.06.19 – 1957.01.17), Titular Bishop of Cœla (1947.06.19 – 1957.01.17); later Bishop of Diocese of Goiás (Brazil) (1957.01.17 – death 1959.11.27).

== External links and sources ==
- GCatholic
