= Diocese of Ipameri =

Latin Catholic ecclesiastical territory in Brazil

Coordinates: 17.7225°S 48.1606°W

Diocese of Ipameri Dioecesis Ipameriensis

Catholic

Location
- Country: Brazil
- Ecclesiastical province: Goiânia

Statistics
- Area: 22,947 km^{2} (8,860 sq mi)
- Population: Total; Catholics: (as of 2006); 285,000; 214,000 (75.1%)

Information
- Denomination: Catholic Church
- Sui iuris church: Latin Church
- Rite: Roman Rite
- Established: 11 October 1966 (60 years ago)
- Cathedral: Catedral Divino Espírito Santo

Current leadership
- Pope: Leo XIV
- Bishop: José Francisco Rodrigues do Rêgo

The Diocese of Ipameri (Latin: Dioecesis Ipameriensis) is a Latin Church ecclesiastical territory or diocese of the Catholic Church in Brazil. It is a suffragan diocese in the ecclesiastical province of the metropolitan Archdiocese of Goiânia.

Its cathedral is Catedral Divino Espírito Santo, dedicated to the Holy Spirit, in the episcopal see of Ipameri. The current bishop is José Francisco Rodrigues do Rêgo.

== History ==
- Established on 11 October 1966 as Diocese of Ipameri, on territory split from its Metropolitan, the Archdiocese of Goiania.
- Lost territory on 1989.03.29 to establish the Diocese of Luziânia

== Statistics ==
As of 2015, it pastorally served 299,000 Catholics (93.4% of 320,000 total population) on 296,426 km² in 17 parishes with 33 priests (17 diocesan, 16 religious), 66 lay religious (21 brothers, 45 sisters) and 5 seminarians.

== Episcopal Ordinaries ==
(all native Brazilians)

Bishops of Ipameri

- Gilberto Pereira Lopes (1966.11.03 – 1975.12.19), next Titular Archbishop of Aurusuliana (1975.12.19 – 1982.02.10) as Coadjutor Archbishop of Campinas (Brazil) (1975.12.19 – 1982.02.10), succeeding as Metropolitan Archbishop of Campinas (Brazil) (1982.02.10 – retired 2004.06.02)
- Antônio Ribeiro de Oliveira (1975.12.19 – 1985.10.23); previously Titular Bishop of Arindela (1961.08.25 – 1975.12.19) as Auxiliary Bishop of Goiânia (Brazil) (1961.08.25 – 1975.12.19); later Metropolitan Archbishop of Goiânia (Brazil) (1985.10.23 – retired 2002.05.08), died 2017
- Tarcísio Sebastião Batista Lopes, O.F.M. Cap. (1986.12.19 – 1998.07.29), died 2001: previously Bishop of Grajaú (Brazil) (1984.04.04 – 1986.12.19)
  - Apostolic Administrator Archbishop Geraldo do Espírito Santo Ávila (1998.07.29 – 1999.05.19), while Titular Archbishop of Gemellæ in Numidia (1990.10.31 – 1998.03.07) as Archbishop Military Ordinariate of Brazil (1990.10.31 – 2005.11.14); previously Titular Bishop of Gemellæ in Numidia (1977.06.27 – 1990.10.31) as Auxiliary Bishop of Archdiocese of Brasília (Brazil) (1977.06.27 – 1990.10.31)
- Guilherme Antônio Werlang, Missionaries of the Holy Family (M.S.F.) (1999.05.19 – 2018.02.07)), next Bishop of Lages (Brazil) (2018.02.07 – ...).
- José Francisco Rodrigues do Rêgo (2019.05.15 - ...,,)

== See also ==
- List of Catholic dioceses in Brazil

== Sources and external links ==
- GCatholic.org, with Google satellite map & HQ picture - data for all sections
- Catholic Hierarchy
