= Territorial Prelature of São José de Alto Tocantins =

Former Catholic jurisdiction in Brazil

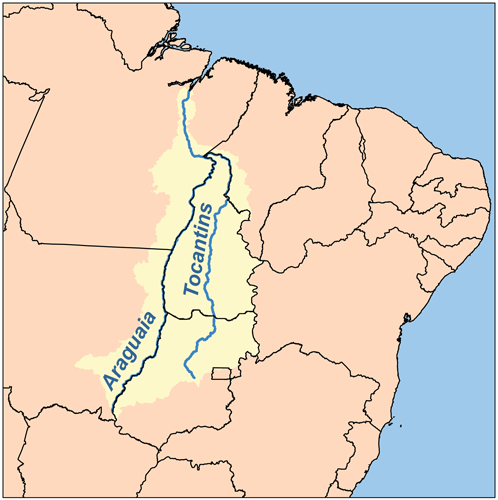
The Araguaia/Tocantins bassin in Brazilian Amazonia

The Territorial Prelature of São José de Alto Tocantins was a short-lived (1924–1956) Latin Church missionary jurisdiction of the Catholic Church administered by the Claretians in inner Brazil's Amazon basin.

== History ==
Established on 25 July 1924 as Territorial Prelature (a pre-diocesan jurisdiction) of São José de Alto Tocantins, on vast territory in the upper basin of the Tocantins River, split off from the Diocese of Goiás. It was run by the Missionary Sons of the Immaculate Heart of Mary (Claretians, C.M.F.), mainly Spanish missionaries.

On 26 March 1956 it was suppressed, its territory being divided to establish the Territorial Prelature of Formosa, Diocese of Uruaçu (to which see its last incumbent was promoted) and Territorial Prelature of Cristalândia.

== Ordinaries ==
Bishop-Prelates of São José de Alto Tocantins

- Apostolic Administrator Father Francesco Ozamiz Corta, Claretians (C.M.F.) (1925 – 1930 see below)
- Florentino Simón y Garriga, C.M.F. (1931.04.10 – 1935.11.23), Titular Bishop of Leuce (1931.04.10 – death 1935.11.23), born on 1868.03.14 in Spain
- Apostolic Administrator Father Francesco Ozamiz Corta, Claretians (C.M.F.) (see above 1936 – 1937)
- Apostolic Administrator Father Francisco Prada Carrera, Claretians (C.M.F.) (1937 – 1946.09.03 see below), Titular Bishop of Bisica (1946.09.03 – 1957.01.17)
- Francisco Prada Carrera, C.M.F. (see above 1946.09.03 – 1957.01.17), later Bishop of Uruaçu (Brazil) (1957.01.17 – retired 1976.02.25-) (born 1893.07.27 in Spain, died 1995.06.07).

== See also ==
- List of Catholic dioceses in Brazil

== Sources and external links ==
- GCatholic - data for all sections
