= José Carlos de Oliveira =

Brazilian Roman Catholic bishop (born 1931)

The Most Reverend José Carlos de Oliveira C.SS.R.
- Bishop Emeritus of Rubiataba–Mozarlândia
- Church: Catholic Church
- Diocese: Diocese of Rubiataba–Mozarlândia
- Appointed: 14 September 1979
- Term ended: 27 February 2008
- Predecessor: Juvenal Roriz
- Successor: Adair José Guimarães

Orders
- Ordination: 27 January 1957
- Consecration: 25 November 1979

Personal details
- Born: 14 March 1931 (age 95) Aparecida, São Paulo, Brazil
- Denomination: Roman Catholic
- Occupation: Missionary, bishop
- Motto: Per te, Virgo

José Carlos de Oliveira, C.SS.R. (born 14 March 1931), also known as Dom Carlinhos, is a Brazilian Roman Catholic prelate, who served as bishop of the Diocese of Rubiataba–Mozarlândia from 1979 until his retirement in 2008.

== Early life and priesthood ==
Oliveira was born on 14 March 1931 in Aparecida, in the state of São Paulo, Brazil. At the age of thirteen, he entered the seminary of the Congregation of the Most Holy Redeemer (Redemptorists). He was ordained a priest on 27 January 1957.

Before his appointment as bishop, he served in parish ministry and missionary work and held leadership positions within the Redemptorist congregation in Brazil.

== Episcopacy ==
On 14 September 1979, Oliveira was appointed as prelate of Rubiataba–Mozarlândia by Pope John Paul II. He received episcopal consecration on 25 November 1979. On 4 December 1979 the territorial prelature was elevated in the ramk of diocese.

During his nearly 29 years as diocesan bishop, he emphasized pastoral outreach to the poor, missionary activity, and support for indigenous peoples. He also supported the development of diocesan institutions and social initiatives, including communication and educational projects.

His resignation was accepted by Pope Benedict XVI on 27 February 2008, upon reaching the canonical retirement age. He was succeeded by Bishop Adair José Guimarães.

== Later life ==
After his retirement, Oliveira continued to participate in ecclesial activities as bishop emeritus. His 90th and 91st birthdays were publicly celebrated by the diocese and by the National Conference of Bishops of Brazil regional section.
