= Our Lady Help of Christians Cathedral, Goiânia =

Our Lady Help of Christians Cathedral
- Catedral Metropolitana Nossa Senhora Auxiliadora
- Our Lady Help of Christians Cathedral
- 16.6790744°S 49.2535955°W
- Location: Goiânia
- Country: Brazil
- Denomination: Roman Catholic Church

Administration
- Archdiocese: Goiânia

The Our Lady Help of Christians Cathedral (Portuguese: Catedral Metropolitana Nossa Senhora Auxiliadora) Also Goiânia Cathedral Is the name that receives a religious building that belongs to the Catholic Church and that is located in Goiânia, capital of the state of Goiás in Brazil.

It is the seat of the Archdiocese of Goiânia (Archidioecesis Goianiensis), created by the bull Sanctissima Christi Voluntas by Pope Pius XII, on March 26, 1956. Don Fernando Gomes dos Santos, Archbishop of Goiânia, was one of the great promoters of The construction of the cathedral, which began as a chapel in 1937.

The current Metropolitan Archbishop of Goiania is D. Washington Cruz, of Bahia.

== See also ==
- Roman Catholicism in Brazil
- Our Lady Help of Christians
