= Diocese of Tumaco =

Diocese of the Catholic Church in Colombia

Diocese of Tumaco Dioecesis Tumacoënsis

Catholic

Location
- Country: Colombia
- Ecclesiastical province: Popayán

Statistics
- Area: 16,400 km^{2} (6,300 sq mi)
- Population: Total; Catholics: (as of 2004); 250,000; 210,000 (84.0%)

Information
- Denomination: Catholic Church
- Rite: Latin Rite
- Established: 1 May 1927 (99 years ago)
- Cathedral: Catedral San Andrés

Current leadership
- Pope: Leo XIV
- Bishop: Franklin Misael Betancourt
- Bishops emeritus: Gustavo Girón Higuita, OCD

Map

Website
- www.diocesisdetumaco.org

The Roman Catholic Diocese of Tumaco (Latin: Tumacoënsis) is a suffragan Latin diocese in the ecclesiastical province of Popayán, in southwestern Colombia.

Its cathedral episcopal see is the Catedral San Andrés, dedicated to Saint Andrew, in the city of Tumaco, Nariño Department.

== History ==
- Established on 1 May 1927 as Apostolic Prefecture of Tumaco, on territories split off from the Diocese of Cali and Diocese of Pasto
- Lost territories twice : on 1952.11.14 to establish the Apostolic Vicariate of Buenaventura and on 1954.04.05 to establish the then Apostolic Prefecture of Guapi
- Promoted on 7 February 1961 as Apostolic Vicariate of Tumaco, hence entitled to a titular bishop
- It enjoyed a Papal visit from Pope John Paul II in July 1986.
- 29 October 1999: Promoted as Diocese of Tumaco.

== Statistics ==
As per 2014, it pastorally served 249,520 Catholics (74.4% of 335,320 total) on 16,000 km^{2} in 17 parishes with 31 priests (19 diocesan, 12 religious), 9 deacons, 39 lay religious (26 brothers, 13 sisters) and 7 seminarians.

== Ordinaries ==
(all Roman rite)

Apostolic Prefects of Tumaco

- Bernardo Merizalde Morales, Augustianian Recollects (O.A.R.) (born Colombia) (1928.03.30 – retired 1949), died 1971
- Peitro Nel Ramirez, O.A.R. (1949.07.14 – ?)
- Luis Francisco Irizar Salazar, Discalced Carmelites (OCD) (born Spain) (1954.04.23 – 1961.02.07 see below)

Apostolic Vicars of Tumaco

- Luis Francisco Irizar Salazar, OCD (see above 1961.02.07 – death 1965.11.05), Titular Bishop of Philæ (1961.02.07 – 1965.11.05)
- Miguel Angel Lecumberri Erburu, OCD (born Spain) (1966.05.03 – retired 1990.02.08), Titular Bishop of Lambiridi (1966.05.03 – death 2007.03.14)
- Gustavo Girón Higuita, OCD (born Colombia) (1990.02.08 – 1999.10.29 see below), Titular Bishop of Bisica (1990.02.08 – 1999.10.29)

Suffragan Bishops of Tumaco

- Gustavo Girón Higuita, OCD (see above 1999.10.29 – retired 2015.07.25)
- Orlando Olave Villanoba (born Colombia; first non-regular incumbent) (2017.03.18 – 11 July 2024)
- Franklin Misael Betancourt (23 October 2025 – Present)

== See also ==
- List of Catholic dioceses in Colombia
- Roman Catholicism in Colombia

== Sources and external links ==
- GCatholic.org, with Google photo - data for all sections
- www.diocesisdetumaco.org Diocesan website
