= Bananal =

Bananal may refer to the following places and jurisdictions :

- Bananal, São Paulo, city in Brazil
- Bananal (micro-region), micro-region in Brazil
- Bananal Island, island in Araguaia River, Brazil
- the former Territorial Prelature of Bananal
