= Francisco de Paula Victor (bishop) =

Brazilian Roman Catholic bishop (1935–2018)

- Auxiliary bishop of Brasilia
- Church: Roman Catholic Church
- See: Roman Catholic Archdiocese of Brasilia
- In office: 1996–2018
- Previous post: Auxiliary bishop of Brasilia

Orders
- Ordination: December 1, 1990
- Consecration: October 26, 1996 by Cardinal José Freire Falcão

Personal details
- Born: 11 November 1935 Paraisópolis, Brazil
- Died: 22 November 2018 (aged 83) Brasília, Brazil
- Denomination: Roman Catholic Church

Styles of Francisco de Paula Victor
- Reference style: His Excellency
- Spoken style: Your Excellency
- Religious style: Auxiliary bishop

Francisco de Paula Victor (11 November 1935 – 21 November 2018) was a Brazilian Roman Catholic bishop.

== Biography ==
He was born in Paraisópolis in 1935, and he graduated in Chemistry at Federal University of Minas Gerais and was ordained to the priesthood in 1990.

He served as titular bishop of Turres in Numidia and as auxiliary bishop of the Roman Catholic Archdiocese of Brasilia, Brazil, from 1996 to 2018.

== Notes ==
Catholic Church titles
Preceded by Martino Matronola, O.S.B.	Titular Bishop of Turres in Numidia; 1990–2018	Succeeded by -
