= João Evangelista Martins Terra =

Brazilian priest (1925–2022)

The Most Reverend João Evangelista Martins Terra
- Auxiliary Bishop of Brasília
- Diocese: Brasília
- Appointed: 15 June 1994
- Term ended: 16 June 2004
- Other post: Titular Bishop of Bagis (1988–2022)
- Previous post: Auxiliary Bishop of Olinda and Recife (1988–1994)

Orders
- Ordination: 22 December 1956
- Consecration: 20 November 1988 by Carlo Furno

Personal details
- Born: 7 March 1925 Jardinópolis, São Paulo, Brazil
- Died: 11 March 2022 (aged 97) Brasília, Brazil
- Motto: CUM CHRISTO ET IN ECCLESIA
- Coat of arms

Styles of Joăo Evangelista Martins Terra
- Reference style: His Excellency; The Most Reverend
- Spoken style: Your Excellency
- Religious style: Auxiliary bishop

Joăo Evangelista Martins Terra, S.J. (7 March 1925 – 11 March 2022) was a Brazilian Roman Catholic bishop.

Born in Brazil, Martins Terra was ordained to the priesthood in 1956 for the Society of Jesus. He was appointed titular bishop of Bagis and then served as the auxiliary bishop of the Roman Catholic Archdiocese of Olinda and Recife, Brazil, from 1988 to 1994 and as the auxiliary bishop of the Roman Catholic Archdiocese of Brasilia, Brazil, from 1994 until his retirement in 2004. Martins Terra died on 11 March 2022, four days after his 97th birthday.

Catholic Church titles
Preceded by José Afonso Ribeiro	Titular Bishop of Bagis; 1988–2022	Succeeded by Sede vacante
