= Cincara =

Civitas of Africa Proconsularis during the Roman Empire

Africa Proconsularis (125 AD)

During the Roman Empire Cincara, was a civitas of Africa Proconsularis.

The town was on the Medjerda river and therefore in the bread basket of Roman North Africa. The Ruins of Cincara can still be seen at Bordj Toumi in Tunisia.

== Bishopric ==
Cincara was a seat of an ancient Christian diocese, of which we know two bishops, one donatist and one catholic indicating the controversy had reached the town. Both bishops attended the Council of Carthage in 411.

Today Cincara survives (since 1933)as a titular see of the Roman Catholic Church.

- Restituto (fl 411)
- Campano (fl 411)(donatista)
- Bishop José Andrés Corral Arredondo (1989 – 1992)
- Bishop Roger Francis Crispian Hollis (1987 – 1988)
- bishop Ricardo Blanco Granda (1969 – 1986)
- Bishop Manuel Castro Ruiz (1965 – 1969)
