= Crich-El-Oued =

Crich-El-Oued Qarish el-Wadi Thisiduo
- Village
- Nickname: Chisiduo
- Location in Tunisia
- Coordinates: 36°38′37″N 9°36′15″E
- Country: Tunisia
- Governorate: Béja Governorate

Crich El Oued, also known as Qarish el-Wadi, is a village in Tunisia, located between Bordj Toumi and Majaz al Bab (36° 41' 00" N 9° 40' 00" E) in Béja Governorate east of Tunis. The village is on the Medjerda river at the confluence with the Oued el-Ahmar and the town has a mosque

== Roman Ruins ==
The ruins west of Crich-El-Oued are the remains of the Roman city of Thisiduo otherwise Thisiduum, a city of Africa Proconsularis which flourished 330 BC - 640AD.

=== Roman Name ===
The original name of the town was probably Thisinduo / Thisinduum. Thomas, reconstructed it thus, and recently found inscriptions which have confirmed this.

The town appears on the Tabula Peutingeriana, and Ravenna Cosmpographica The name evolved following the Muslim conquest of the Maghreb from Thisinduo to Chisiduo. and then Crich.

== Roman History ==
The history of Thisiduum is hardly known. The inscription CIL 14763 = ILS 6781 testifies to a municipium under Latin law, and to an aedile. Toulotte suspects in Bishop Tadduensis of the year 646 an origin from Thisiduum.

There are few remains meaningfully sited in the ruins because of reuse of the stone in the Middle Ages and building over the former structures. There are remains of a Roman bridge that crosses the Oued el Hamar and some temples are discernible, with a number of trunks of columns, some in stone, others in white marble, littering the town. Inscriptions bear witness to at least two temples

There are also separate ruins nearby at Chouigui and Goubellat and 7 km away at Medjez el Bab.

=== Ancient Bishopric ===
During the Roman Empire this part of the Medjerda river valley had a high density of bishoprics with four other bishops resident within 10 kilometers of Crich El Oued.
