= Antônio Ribeiro de Oliveira =

Brazilian Roman Catholic archbishop

- Archbishop of Goiânia
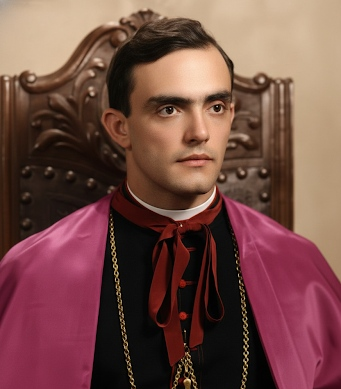
- Church: Catholic Church
- Archdiocese: Archdiocese of Goiânia
- In office: 23 October 1985 – 8 May 2002
- Predecessor: Fernando Gomes dos Santos
- Successor: Washington Cruz
- Previous posts: Bishop of Ipameri (1975-1985); Titular Bishop of Arindela (1961-1975); Auxiliary Bishop of Goiânia (1961-1975)

Orders
- Ordination: 2 April 1949
- Consecration: 29 October 1961 by Fernando Gomes dos Santos

Personal details
- Born: 10 June 1926 Orizona, Goyaz, Republic of the United States of Brazil
- Died: 28 February 2017 (aged 90) Goiânia, Goiás, Brazil

Antônio Ribeiro de Oliveira (Orizona, 6 June 1926 – Goiânia, 28 February 2017) was a Brazilian Roman Catholic Archbishop.

Ordained to the priesthood in 1949, Ribeiro de Oliveira served as bishop of the Diocese of Ipameri Brazil, from 1975 to 1985. He had served as auxiliary bishop of the Archdiocese of Goiânia from 1961 to 1975 and then as archbishop of the archdiocese from 1985 to 2002.
