= José da Silva Chaves =

Brazilian Roman Catholic bishop (born 1930)

The Most Reverend José da Silva Chaves
- Bishop Emeritus of Uruaçu
- Church: Roman Catholic Church
- Diocese: Uruaçu
- Appointed: 29 November 1967
- Term ended: 24 January 2007

Orders
- Ordination: 8 December 1955
- Consecration: 11 February 1968 by Fernando Gomes dos Santos

Personal details
- Born: José da Silva Chaves; 15 May 1930 (age 96) São Domingos, Goiás, Brazil
- Motto: OBŒDIENTIA ET PAX

José da Silva Chaves (born 15 May 1930) is a Brazilian Roman Catholic prelate who served as Bishop of the Diocese of Uruaçu in the state of Goiás from 1976 until his retirement in 2007. He previously served as auxiliary bishop and in various leadership roles within the diocese.

== Early life and priesthood ==
José da Silva Chaves was born on 15 May 1930 in São Domingos, in the state of Goiás, Brazil. He undertook philosophical studies in Minas Gerais and theological studies at the Theological Seminary Santa Cruz in Silvânia, completing his formation in 1955. Chaves was ordained as a priest on 8 December 1955 in the Archdiocese of Goiânia.

== Episcopal ministry ==
On 29 November 1967, Chaves was appointed auxiliary bishop of the Diocese of Uruaçu and titular bishop of Rusubbicari. He received his episcopal consecration on 11 February 1968 at the cathedral in Goiânia, with Archbishop Fernando Gomes dos Santos serving as principal consecrator.

After serving as auxiliary bishop and later as administrator sede plena of Uruaçu, Chaves was named Bishop of Uruaçu. He led the diocese from 1976 until his resignation was accepted on 24 January 2007, upon reaching the age limit established by church law. During his nearly four decades of leadership, he oversaw diocesan growth, clergy formation, pastoral programs, and the establishment of new parishes within the region.

== Later life and activities ==
Following his retirement, Chaves became Bishop Emeritus of Uruaçu. In 2023 he was noted in local media for celebrating liturgical events, including Mass at the chapel of the Tribunal de Justiça de Goiás (TJGO), where his long service and pastoral presence in the community were highlighted.
