= Tomás Balduino =

Brazilian Catholic bishop (1922–2014)

Tomás Balduíno, O.P.
- Bishop of Diocese of Goiás (emeritus)
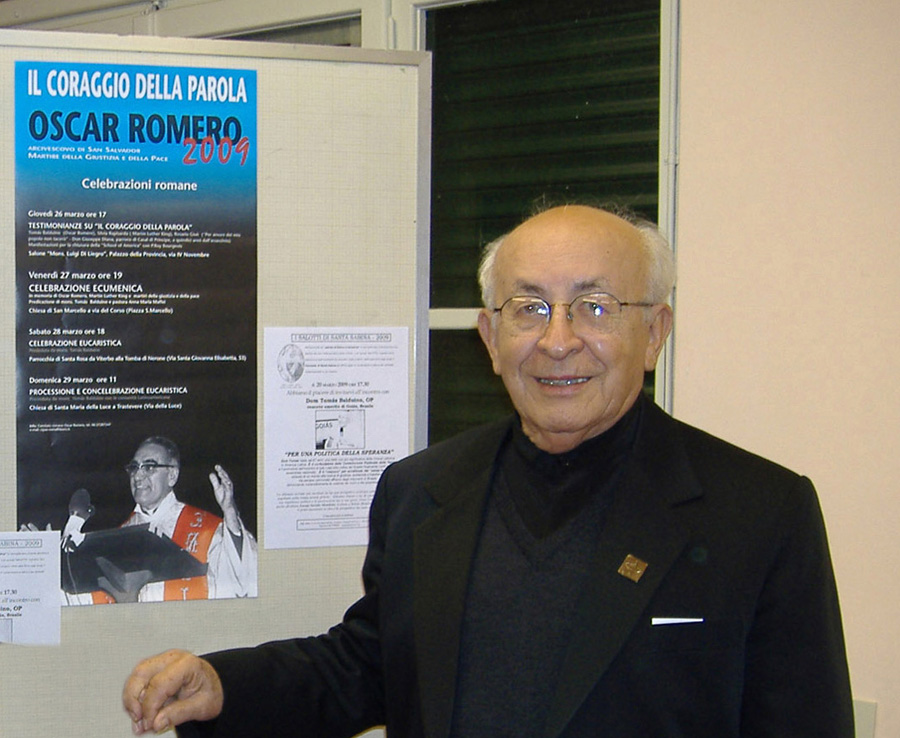
- Church: Roman Catholic Church
- See: Diocese of Goiás
- In office: 1967–1998
- Predecessor: Abel Ribeiro Camelo
- Successor: Eugène Lambert Adrian Rixen
- Previous post: Prelate

Orders
- Ordination: July 4, 1948

Personal details
- Born: December 31, 1922 Posse, Goiás, Brazil
- Died: May 2, 2014 (aged 91) Goiânia, Goiás, Brazil

Tomás Balduíno, O.P. (born Paulo Balduino de Sousa Décio, December 31, 1922 – May 2, 2014) was a Brazilian Catholic diocesan bishop.

== Biography ==
Tomás Balduíno was born in Posse, Goiás, and was ordained a priest on July 4, 1948, from the religious order of the Order of Friars Preachers, known as the Dominican Order. Balduíno was appointed Coadjutor Prelate of the Roman Catholic Diocese of Santíssima Conceição do Araguaia on August 15, 1967, as well as titular bishop of Vicus Pacati.

Balduíno was appointed bishop of Roman Catholic Diocese of Goiás on November 10, 1967, and was ordained bishop on November 26, 1967.

He was the founder, in 1975, and first president of the Comissão Patroral da Terra.

Balduíno retired as bishop on December 2, 1998.

Balduíno has been referred to as one of the most important promoters of the Liberation theology. In March 2009, he participated in ceremonies in Rome commemorating the 29th anniversary of the murder of Mgr. Óscar Romero.
