= Microregion of Bananal =

Coordinates: 22°41′02″S 44°19′22″W

- Microregion
- Location of Microregion of Bananal in the state of São Paulo
- Country: Brazil
- Region: Southeast
- State: São Paulo
- Mesoregion: Vale do Paraíba Paulista
- Time zone: UTC-3 (UTC-3)
  - Summer (DST): UTC-2 (UTC-2)

See Bananal for namesakes

The Microregion of Bananal (Portuguese: Microrregião de Bananal) is a microregion in the east of São Paulo State, Brazil.

It is the easternmost microregion of the state, bordered by the state of Rio de Janeiro to the east.

== Municipalities ==
The microregion consists of the following municipalities:

- Bananal city
- Arapeí
- Areias
- São José do Barreiro
- Silveiras

== See also ==
- Bananal Island
- the former Catholic Territorial Prelature of Bananal
