= Afonso Fioreze =

Brazilian priest (1942–2021)

Afonso Fioreze (1 June 1942 – 6 February 2021) was a Brazilian Roman Catholic bishop.

Fioreze was born in Rio Branco do Sul, Paraná, and was ordained to the priesthood in 1970. He served as coadjutor bishop of the Roman Catholic Diocese of Luziânia, Brazil in 2003 and 2004 and as bishop of the diocese from 2004 to 2017. He died in São Paulo from cancer.
