= Archdiocese of Brasília =

Catholic ecclesiastical territory in Brazil

Coordinates: 15.7833°S 47.9000°W

Metropolitan Archdiocese of Brasília Archidioecesis Metropolitae Brasiliapolitanus Arquidiocese Metropolitano de Brasília
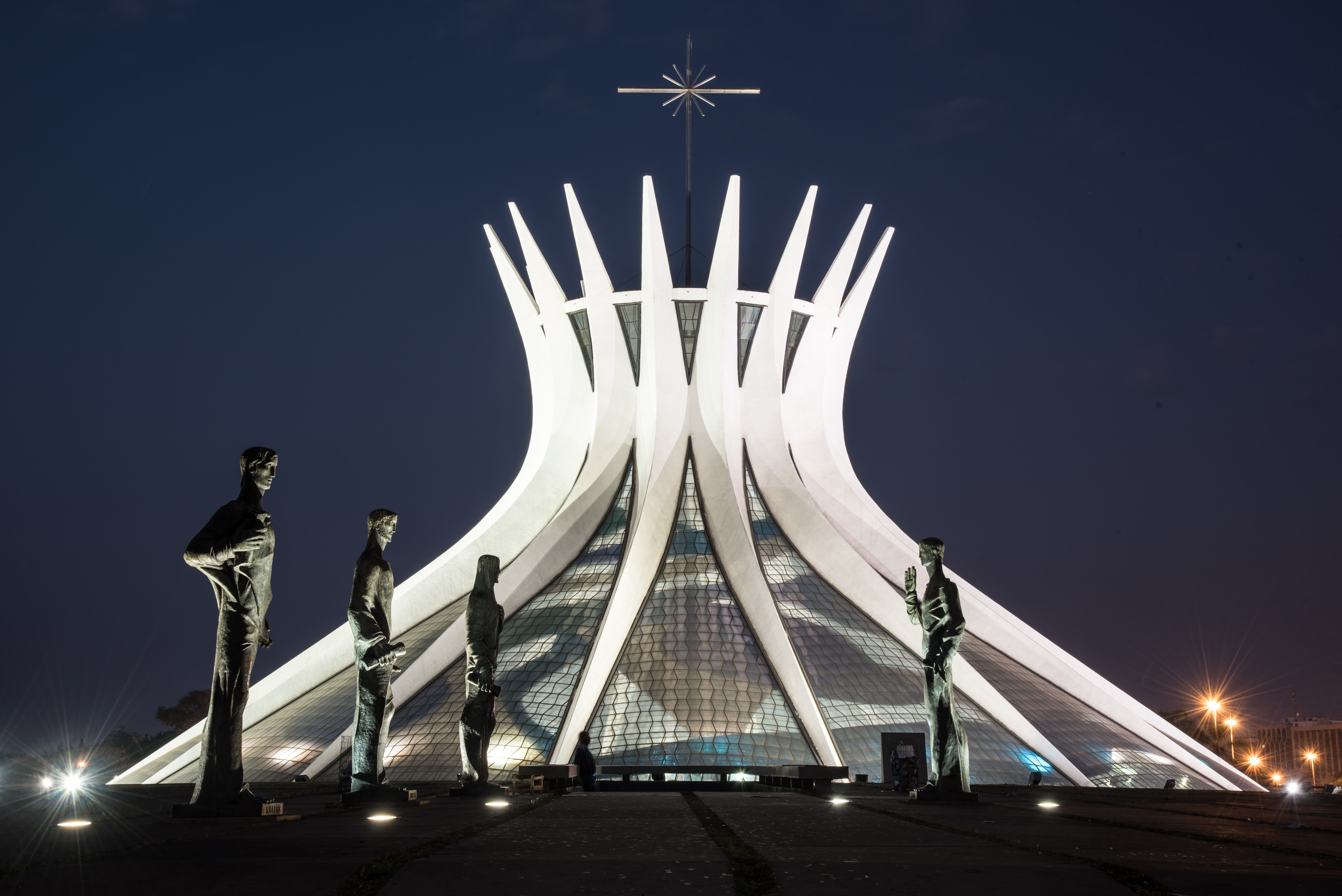
- Metropolitan Cathedral of Our Lady of Aparecida

- Coat of arms

Location
- Country: Brazil
- Ecclesiastical province: Brasilia

Statistics
- Area: 5,814 km^{2} (2,245 sq mi)
- Population: Total; Catholics: (as of 2012); 2,267,000; 1,555,000 (68.6%)

Information
- Denomination: Catholic Church
- Sui iuris church: Latin Church
- Rite: Roman Rite
- Established: 16 January 1960 (66 years ago)
- Cathedral: Cathedral of Our Lady of Aparecida

Current leadership
- Pope: Leo XIV
- Archbishop: Paulo Cezar Costa
- Metropolitan Archbishop: Paulo Cezar Costa
- Auxiliary Bishops: José Aparecido Gonçalves de Almeida; Marcony Vinícius Ferreira

Website
- www.arquidiocesedebrasilia.org.br

The Metropolitan Archdiocese of Brasília (Latin: Archidioecesis Metropolitae Brasiliapolitanus) is ecclesiastical territory or archdiocese of the Latin Church of the Catholic Church located in the city of Brasília in Brazil. The archdiocese is a metropolitan see.

== History ==
- January 16, 1960: Established as Diocese of Brasília from the Metropolitan Archdiocese of Goiânia
- October 11, 1966: Promoted to Metropolitan Archdiocese of Brasília

== Bishops ==
=== Archbishops of Brasília ===
- Jose Newton de Almeida Baptista (1960–1984), was Archbishop (personal title) until the see was raised to archdiocese in 1966
- José Freire Falcão (1984–2004) (Cardinal in 1988)
- João Braz de Aviz (2004–2011), appointed Prefect of the Congregation for Institutes of Consecrated Life and Societies of Apostolic Life (Cardinal in 2012)
- Sérgio da Rocha (2011–2020) (Cardinal in 2016), appointed Archbishop of São Salvador da Bahia
- Paulo Cezar Costa (2020–present) (Cardinal in 2022)

=== Auxiliary bishops ===
- Aloísio Sinésio Bohn (1977-1980), appointed Bishop of Novo Hamburgo, Río Grande do Sul
- Geraldo do Espírito Santo Ávila (1977-1990), appointed Archbishop of Brazil, Military
- Raymundo Damasceno Assis (1986-2004), appointed Archbishop of Aparecida, São Paulo (Cardinal in 2010)
- Alberto Taveira Corrêa (1991-1996), appointed Archbishop of Palmas, Tocantins
- Jésus Rocha (1993-2004), appointed Bishop of Oliveira, Minas Gerais
- João Evangelista Martins Terra, S.J. (1994-2004)
- Francisco de Paula Victor (1996-2011)
- Leonardo Ulrich Steiner, O.F.M. (2011-2019), appointed Archbishop of Manaus, Amazonas
- Valdir Mamede (2013-2019), appointed Bishop of Catanduva, São Paulo
- José Aparecido Gonçalves de Almeida (2013-
- Marcony Vinícius Ferreira (2014-

=== Other priests of this diocese who became bishops ===
- José Ronaldo Ribeiro, appointed Bishop of Janaúba, Minas Gerais in 2007
- Waldemar Passini Dalbello, appointed Auxiliary Bishop of Goiânia, Goias in 2009; Apostolic Administrator here in 2011
- Marcos Antônio Tavoni, appointed Bishop of Bom Jesus do Gurguéia, Piaui in 2014
- Jeová Elias Ferreira, appointed Bishop of Goias in 2020
- Giovanni Carlos Caldas Barroca, appointed Bishop of Uruaçu (Uruassu), Goias in 2020

== Suffragan dioceses ==
- Diocese of Formosa
- Diocese of Luziânia
- Diocese of Uruaçu

== Sources ==
- GCatholic.org
- Catholic Hierarchy
