= Diocese of Uruaçu =

Catholic ecclesiastical territory

Diocese of Uruaçu Dioecesis Uruassuensis Diocese de Uruaçu
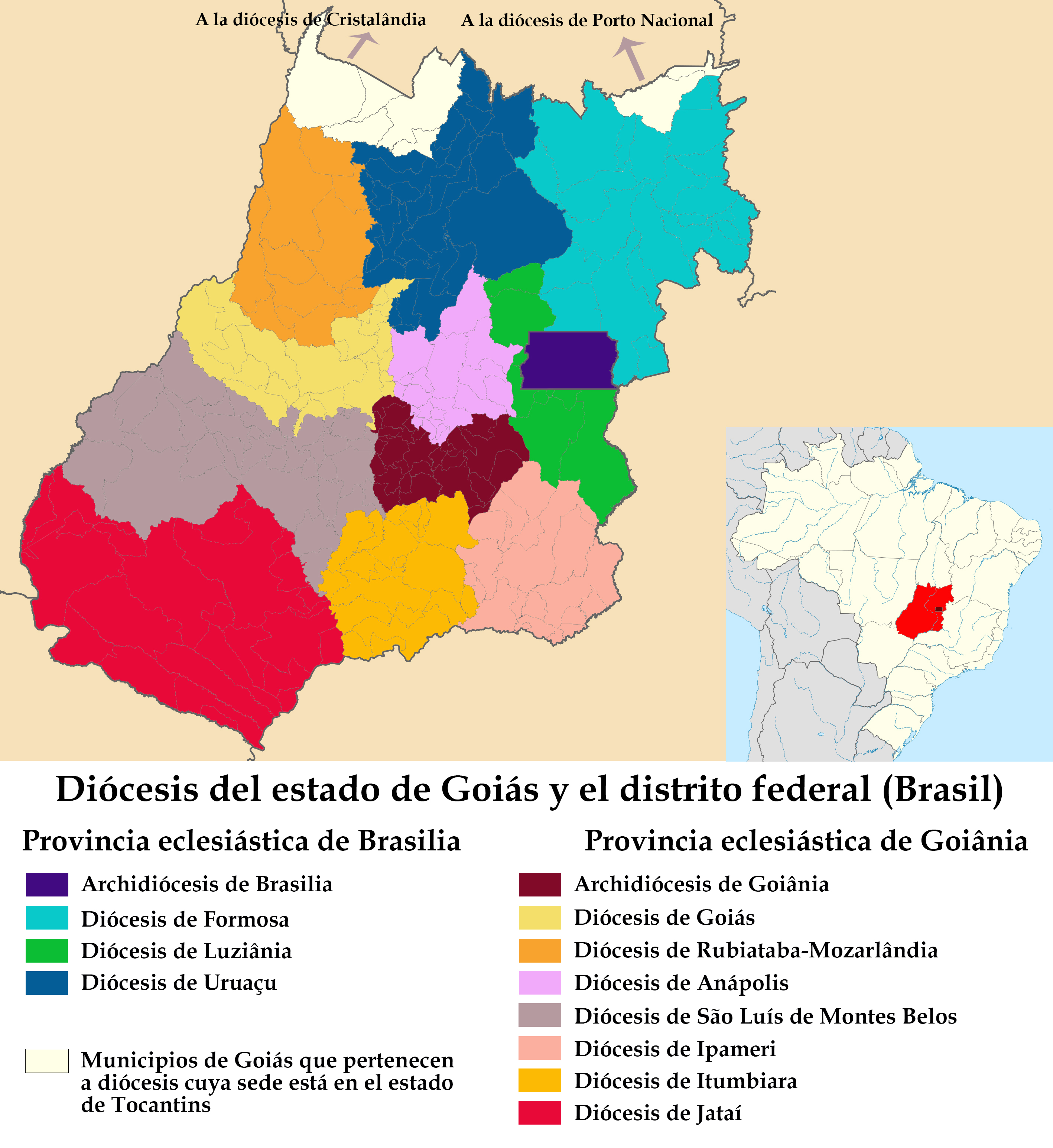
- Dioceses of the Catholic Church in the state of Goiás and the Federal District of Brazil

Location
- Country: Brazil
- Ecclesiastical province: Brasília
- Metropolitan: Brasília

Statistics
- Area: 43,000 km^{2} (17,000 sq mi)
- Population: Total; Catholics: (as of 2010); 376,000; 319,000 (84.8%)

Information
- Rite: Latin Rite
- Established: 26 March 1956 (69 years ago)
- Cathedral: Cathedral of St Anne in Uruaçu

Current leadership
- Pope: Leo XIV
- Bishop: Giovanni Carlos Caldas Barroca
- Bishops emeritus: José da Silva Chaves

The Roman Catholic Diocese of Uruaçu (Latin: Dioecesis Uruassuensis) is a diocese located in the city of Uruaçu in the ecclesiastical province of Brasília in Brazil.

On June 17, 2020, Giovanni Carlos Caldas Barroca, a priest of the Brasilia archdiocese, was appointed the new Bishop here.

== History ==
- 1956.03.26: Established as Diocese of Uruaçu from the Metropolitan Archdiocese of Goiás

== Bishops ==
- Bishops of Uruaçu (Roman rite), in reverse chronological order
  - Bishop-Elect Giovanni Carlos Caldas Barroca (2020.06.17 – ...)
  - Bishop Messias dos Reis Silveira (2007.01.03 – 2018.11.14), appointed Bishop of Teófilo Otoni, Minas Gerais
  - Bishop José da Silva Chaves (1976.05.14 – 2007.01.03)
  - Bishop Francisco Prada Carrera, C.M.F. (1957.01.17 – 1976.02.25)

=== Auxiliary bishop ===
- José da Silva Chaves (1967-1976), appointed Bishop here

=== Other priests of this diocese who became bishops ===
- Adair José Guimarães, appointed Bishop of Rubiataba-Mozarlândia, Goias in 2008
- José Francisco Rodrigues do Rêgo, appointed Bishop of Ipameri, Goias in 2019

== Sources ==
- GCatholic.org
- Diocese website
