= Nomen =

Nomen may refer to:

- Nomen gentilicium, the ancient Roman family name carried on by members of the gens
  - Nomen est omen, a Latin quote about nominative determinism
- Nomen (ancient Egypt), the personal name of Ancient Egyptian pharaohs
- Jaume Nomen (born 1960), Catalan astronomer
- Nomen, Latin for noun
- Nomen, part of the FRSAD library model

== See also ==
- Nō-men, the mask used in Noh performances
- Nomina (journal), published by the Society for Name Studies in Britain and Ireland
