= Hosabettu =

- village
- Location in Karnataka, India
- Coordinates: 13.02°N 75.00°E
- Country: India
- State: Karnataka
- District: Dakshina Kannada

Government
  - Body: Gram panchayat

Area
  - Total: 10.06 km^{2} (3.88 sq mi)

Population (2011)
  - Total: 2,260
  - Density: 225/km^{2} (582/sq mi)

Languages
  - Official: Kannada
- Time zone: UTC+5:30 (IST)
- PIN: 575026
- ISO 3166 code: IN-KA
- Vehicle registration: KA
- Website: karnataka.gov.in

Hosabettu is a village located in Mangalore Taluk of Dakshina Kannada District in the Indian state of Karnataka. It is located near Moodbidri and Mangalore.

== Demographics ==
As of 2011 India census, Hosabettu had a population of 2,260. There are 1043 Males 1095 and 1165 females. Hosabettu village has geographical area of 1006.63 hectares with 498 families residing in it. Languages are primarily Tulu, Konkani and Kannada.

Also there is another place by same name Hosabettu a residential locality near Surathkal coming under Mangaluru City Corporation limits. This Hosabettu adjoins national highway 66 ( previously NH-17 ) running from Panvel (near Mumbai city) to Kochi (Cochin).
