= Agostinho Januszewicz =

Roman Catholic bishop

Agostinho Stefan Januszewicz O.F.M. Conv. (29 November 1930 – 20 March 2011) was the Roman Catholic bishop of the Roman Catholic Diocese of Luziânia, Brazil.

Born in Podwojponie, a village in Podlaskie Voivodeship, Poland, just on the Polish-Lithuanian border. Januszewicz was ordained a Franciscan priest in 1958. In 1989, he was named Roman Catholic bishop of the Roman Catholic Diocese of Luziânia, but resigned in 2004. He died of cancer on 20 March 2011 in Juruá, Amazonas, where he was buried.
