= Manuel Pestana Filho =

- Bishop of the Diocese of Anápolis Emeritus
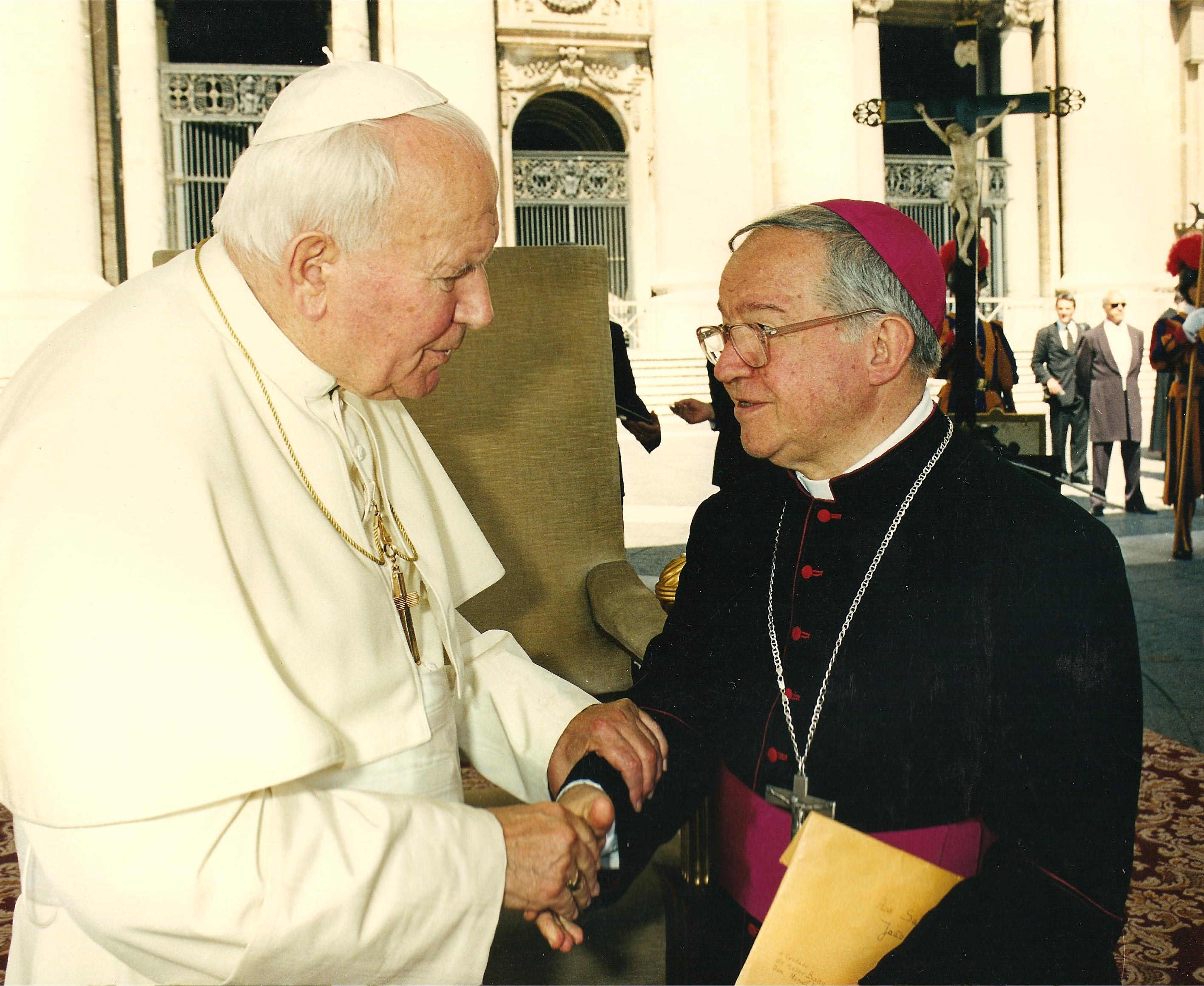
- Bishop Pestana Filho meets Pope John Paul II in Rome
- Church: Roman Catholic Church
- See: Roman Catholic Diocese of Anápolis
- In office: 1978 - 2004
- Predecessor: Epaminondas José de Araújo
- Successor: João Casimiro Wilk

Orders
- Ordination: October 5, 1952
- Consecration: February 18, 1979 by Carmine Rocco

Personal details
- Born: April 27, 1928 Santos, Brazil
- Died: January 8, 2011 (aged 82) Santos, Brazil

Manuel Pestana Filho (April 27, 1928 – January 8, 2011) was the Roman Catholic bishop of the Roman Catholic Diocese of Anápolis, Brazil.

Ordained to the priesthood in 1952, he was appointed bishop of the Anápolis Diocese in 1978 and consecrated on February 18, 1979. During this time, Bishop Pestana requested that students and professors of the Canons Regular religious congregation assist in his reforms to the seminary in his diocese. Bishop Athanasius Schneider was amongst the first 12 students of the Canons Regular sent to Brazil. Schneider was ordained by Bishop Pestana on March 25, 1990.

Bishop Pestana Filho retired in 2004.
