= Vicente do Espirito Santo =

Most Reverend Vicente do Espirito Santo
- Prelate of Goiás
- Church: Catholic Church
- Diocese: Territorial Prelature of Goiás
- In office: 1782–1788
- Predecessor: None
- Successor: José Nicolau de Azevedo Coutinho Gentil
- Previous post: Bishop of São Tomé e Príncipe (1778–1782)

Orders
- Ordination: 29 Sep 1754
- Consecration: 30 Nov 1779 by Antonio Bonifacio Coelho

Personal details
- Born: 15 Oct 1730 Belém, Portugal
- Died: 29 Nov 1788 (age 58) Goiás, Brazil

Vicente do Espirito Santo, O.A.D. (1730–1788) was a Roman Catholic prelate who served as the first Prelate of Goiás (1782–1788) and Bishop of São Tomé e Príncipe (1778–1782).

== Biography ==
Vicente do Espirito Santo was born in Belém, Portugal on 15 Oct 1730 and ordained a deacon in the Order of Discalced Augustinians on 22 Sep 1754 and ordained a priest on 29 Sep 1754. On 30 Dec 1778, he was selected as Bishop of São Tomé e Príncipe and confirmed by Pope Pius VI on 1 Mar 1779. On 30 Nov 1779, he was consecrated bishop by Antonio Bonifacio Coelho, Titular Archbishop of Lacedaemonia, with Francisco de São Simão, Bishop of Santiago de Cabo Verde, and Domingos da Encarnação Pontével, Bishop of Mariana, serving as co-consecrators. On 25 Nov 1782, he resigned as Bishop of São Tomé e Príncipe and shortly after was appointed by Pope Pius VI as the first Prelate of Goiás on 17 Dec 1782. He served as Prelate of Goiás until his death on 29 Nov 1788.

== Episcopal succession ==
Episcopal succession of Vicente do Espirito Santo

While bishop, he was the principal co-consecrator of:

- José do Menino Jesus (Deus), Bishop of São Luís do Maranhão (1780);
- José da Avé-Maria Leite da Costa e Silva, Bishop of Angra (1783);
- Alexandre da Sagrada Familia Ferreira da Silva, Bishop of Malacca (1783); and
- Vicente Ferreira da Rocha, Bishop of Castelo Branco (1783).

Catholic Church titles
Preceded by Antonio Nogueira (bishop)	Bishop of São Tomé e Príncipe; 1778–1782	Succeeded by Domingo do Rosario
Preceded by None	Prelate of Goiás; 1782–1788	Succeeded by José Nicolau de Azevedo Coutinho Gentil
