= Bordj Toumi =

Town in Tunisia

Africa Proconsularis (125 AD)

Bordj Toumi or Borj Toumi is a town in Tunisia located at 36°45'33"N 9°43'3"E It is a railway town on the Medjerda river. The town is near Dor el Gabsi west of Tunis and at n elevation of 52 meters above sea level.

== History ==
During the Roman Empire, Bordj Toumi was the site of a civitas of Africa Proconsularis called Cincara. That town was in the bread basket of Roman North Africa and also the seat of an ancient Bishopric. The ruins of that town can still be seen today.

The town was captured by Arab armies around the 680s, during the Muslim conquest of the Maghreb.

During world War 2, the town was caught up in Operation Torch.
