= Presbytery =

Presbytery and presbyterium may refer to:

- Presbyterium, a body of ordained, active priests in the Catholic or Anglican churches
- Presbytery (architecture), an area of a church building more commonly referred to as the "sanctuary", part of the chancel
- Presbytery (church polity), a governing body of elders in Presbyterianism
- Presbytery (residence), a clergy house, especially for the home of one or more Roman Catholic priests

== See also ==
- Presbyter
- Category:Presbyteries and classes
