= Adair José Guimarães =

- Bishop of Formosa
- Church: Catholic Church
- Diocese: Diocese of Formosa
- Appointed: 27 February 2019
- Predecessor: José Ronaldo Ribeiro
- Previous post: Bishop of Rubiataba–Mozarlândia (2008-2019)

Orders
- Ordination: 21 December 1986
- Consecration: 17 May 2008 by José da Silva Chaves

Personal details
- Born: 16 June 1960 (age 66) Mara Rosa, Goiás, United States of Brazil

Adair José Guimarães (Mara Rosa, 16 June 1960) is a bishop at the Roman Catholic Diocese of Formosa, state of Goiás, Brazil.

He was bishop at the Roman Catholic Diocese of Rubiataba-Mozarlândia.
