= Diocese of Anápolis =

Catholic ecclesiastical territory

Coordinates: 16.3287°S 48.9574°W

Diocese of Anápolis Dioecesis Anapolitanus

Catholic
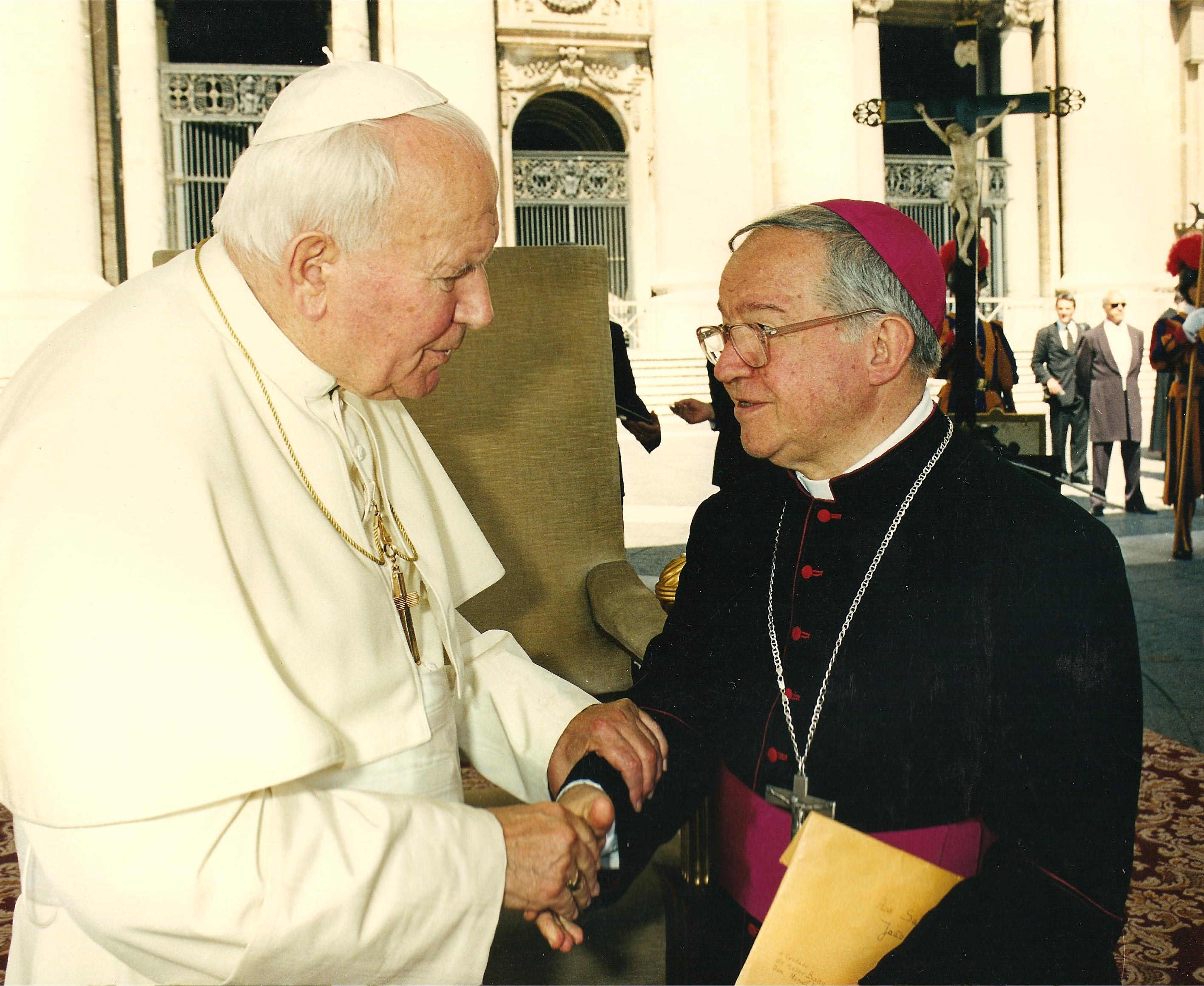

Location
- Country: Brazil
- Ecclesiastical province: Goiânia

Statistics
- Area: 14,227 km^{2} (5,493 sq mi)
- Population: Total; Catholics: (as of 2004); 465,212; 325,648 (70.0%)

Information
- Rite: Roman Rite
- Established: 11 October 1966 (60 years ago)
- Cathedral: Catedral Senhor Bom Jesus

Current leadership
- Pope: Leo XIV
- Bishop: Waldemar Passini Dalbello

Website
- www.diocesedeanapolis.org.br

The Roman Catholic Diocese of Anápolis (Latin: Dioecesis Anapolitanus) is a diocese located in the city of Anápolis in the ecclesiastical province of Goiânia in Brazil.

== History ==
- October 11, 1966: Established as Diocese of Anápolis from the Metropolitan Archdiocese of Goiânia

== Bishops ==
- Bishops of Anápolis (Latin Church)
  - Epaminondas José de Araújo (27 Oct 1966 – 5 Jun 1978), appointed Bishop of Palmeira dos Índios, Alagoas
  - Manuel Pestana Filho (30 Nov 1978 – 9 Jun 2004)
  - João Casimiro Wilk, O.F.M. Conv. (9 Jun 2004 – 11 Nov 2025)
  - Waldemar Passini Dalbello (11 Nov 2025 – present)

=== Auxiliary bishop ===
- Dilmo Franco de Campos (27 Nov 2019 – 1 Aug 2024)

=== Coadjutor ===
- Waldemar Passini Dalbello (5 Feb 2025 – 11 Nov 2025)

== See also ==
- Our Lady of the Rosary Parish
