= Bijga =

Ancient city in Tunisia

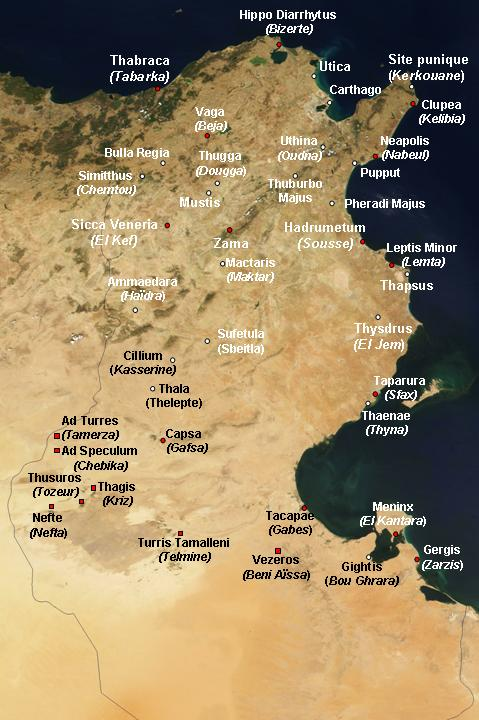
Map showing Bijga

Bijga, also known as Henchir-Bijga, is a place in Tunisia, North Africa, near the city of Tunis.

== History ==
During the Roman Empire, the town was part of the province of Africa proconsularis and gained importance possibly from the second century AD onwards. It was first a colonia and then a municipium and had baths, an aqueduct and possibly a capitolium.

The town became also the seat of the ancient Christian bishopric of Bisca, which although ceasing to function with the Muslim conquest of the Maghreb, survives today as a titular see of the Roman Catholic Church The ruins of the ancient town can still be seen.
