= Archdiocese of Goiânia =

Catholic ecclesiastical territory

Coordinates: 16.6793°S 49.2534°W

Archdiocese of Goiânia Archidioecesis Goianiensis Arquidiocese de Goiânia

Catholic
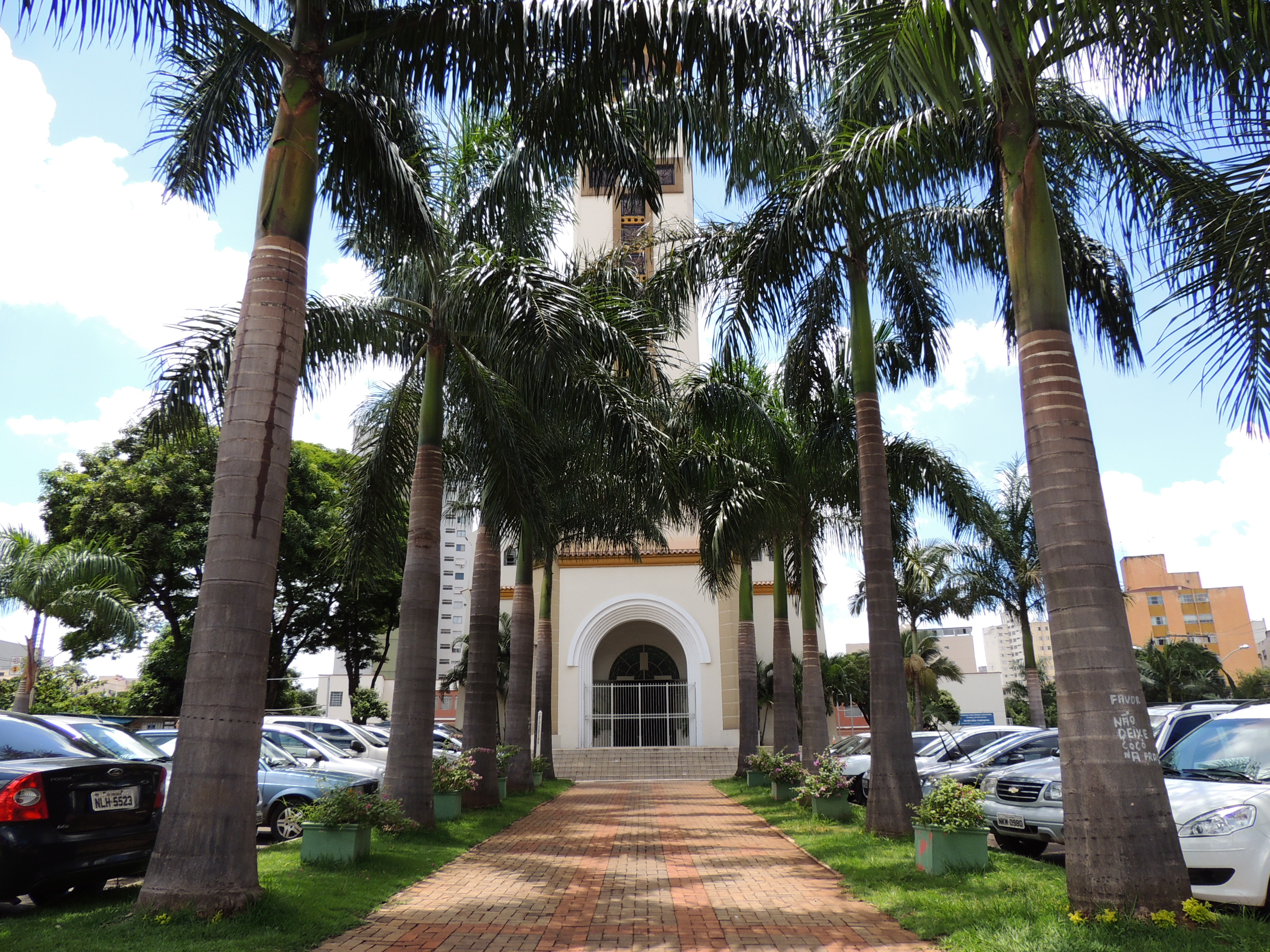

Location
- Country: Brazil
- Ecclesiastical province: Goiânia

Statistics
- Area: 13,855 km^{2} (5,349 sq mi)
- Population: Total; Catholics: (as of 2006); 1,850,000; 1,115,550 (60.3%)

Information
- Rite: Latin Rite
- Established: 26 March 1956 (70 years ago)
- Cathedral: Catedral Metropolitana Nossa Senhora Auxiliadora

Current leadership
- Pope: Leo XIV
- Metropolitan Archbishop: João Justino de Medeiros Silva
- Auxiliary Bishops: Levi Bonatto, Opus Dei

Website
- arquidiocesedegoiania.org.br

The Roman Catholic Archdiocese of Goiânia (Latin: Archidioecesis Goianiensis) is an archdiocese located in and around the city of Goiânia in the Central-West Region of Brazil.

== History ==
- March 26, 1956: Established as Metropolitan Archdiocese of Goiânia from the Metropolitan Archdiocese of Goiás

== Minor Basilica ==
- Basilica of the Eternal Father, Trindade

== Bishops ==
The following bishops, all Roman Rite, have served the archdiocese:

=== Episcopal ordinaries ===
1. Fernando Gomes dos Santos (7 March 1957 – 1 June 1985), who attended the Second Vatican Council.
2. Antônio Ribeiro de Oliveira (23 October 1985 – 8 May 2002)
3. Washington Cruz, CP (8 May 2002 – 9 December 2021)
4. João Justino de Medeiros Silva (9 December 2021 – present)

=== Auxiliary bishops ===
- Antônio Ribeiro de Oliveira (1975-1985), appointed Archbishop here
- Waldemar Passini Dalbello (2009-2014), appointed Coadjutor Bishop of Luziânia, Goias
- Levi Bonatto, Opus Dei (2014- )
- Moacir Silva Arantes (2016-2020), appointed Bishop of Barreiras

Bishop Fernando Gomes dos Santos spoke about the ministry of a bishop as he envisaged it during a debate at the Second Vatican Council:

It is time, venerable Fathers, to completely leave behind the figure of the bishop as a mere administrator or governor, established as a "lord", like that of a king providing and governing from afar, separated from his sheep, separated and segregated from his own presbyterate."

Instead of being served by all, he said, the bishop himself "should stand in the midst of the people and serve all".

== Suffragan dioceses ==
- Diocese of Anápolis
- Diocese of Goiás
- Diocese of Ipameri
- Diocese of Itumbiara
- Diocese of Jataí
- Diocese of Rubiataba–Mozarlândia
- Diocese of São Luís de Montes Belos

== Sources ==
- GCatholic.org
- Catholic Hierarchy
- Archdiocese website (Portuguese)
