= Diocese of Goiás =

Latin Catholic territory in Brazil

Coordinates: 15.9342°S 50.1403°W

Diocese of Goiasensis Dioecesis Goiasensis

Catholic
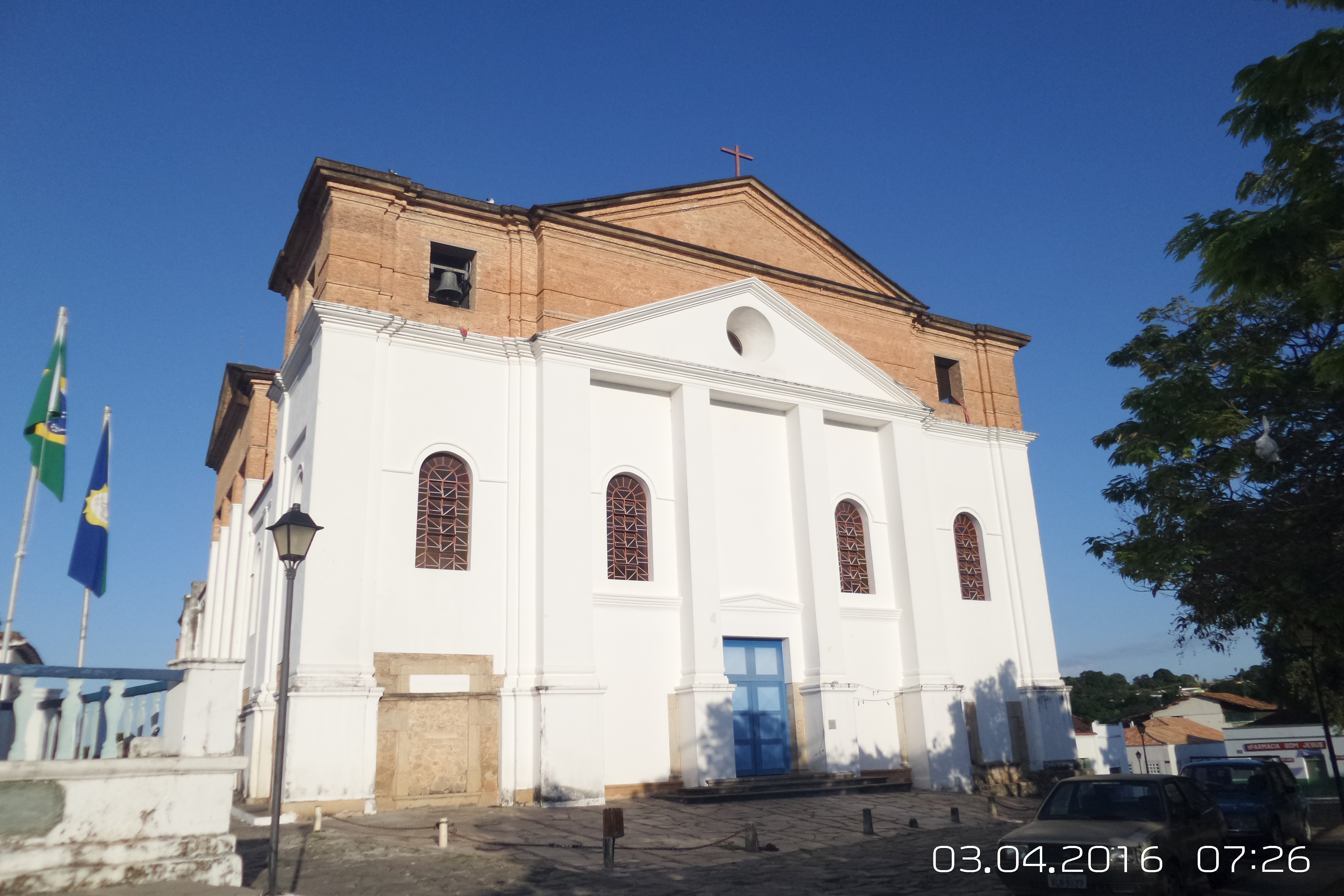
- Cathedral of Goiás

Location
- Country: Brazil
- Ecclesiastical province: Goiânia

Statistics
- Area: 23,573 km^{2} (9,102 sq mi)
- Population: Total; Catholics: (as of 2006); 224,395; 208,000 (92.7%)

Information
- Denomination: Catholic Church
- Sui iuris church: Latin Church
- Rite: Roman Rite
- Established: 6 December 1745 (280 years ago)
- Cathedral: Catedral Sant’Ana

Current leadership
- Pope: Leo XIV
- Bishop: Jeová Elias Ferreira
- Bishops emeritus: Eugène Lambert Adrian Rixen

The Diocese of Goiás (Latin: Dioecesis Goiasensis) is Latin Church ecclesiastical territory or diocese of the Catholic Church located in the city of Goiás. It is a suffragan in the ecclesiastical province of the metropolitan Archdiocese of Goiânia in Brazil.

== History ==
- December 6, 1745: Established as Territorial Prelature of Goiás from the Diocese of São Sebastião do Rio de Janeiro
- July 15, 1826: Promoted as Diocese of Goiás
- November 18, 1932: Promoted as Metropolitan Archdiocese of Goiás
- March 26, 1956: Demoted as Diocese of Goiás

== Bishops ==
=== Ordinaries, in reverse chronological order ===
- Bishops of Goiás (Roman rite), below
  - Bishop Jeová Elias Ferreira (2020.05.27 – present)
  - Bishop Eugène Lambert Adrian Rixen (1998.12.02 – 2020.05.27)
  - Bishop Tomás Balduino, O.P. (1967.11.10 – 1998.12.02)
  - Bishop Abel Ribeiro Camelo (1960.05.14 – 1966.11.24)
  - Bishop Cândido Bento Maria Penso, O.P. (1957.01.17 – 1959.11.27)
- Metropolitan Archbishops of Goiás (Roman Rite), below
  - Archbishop Emanuel (Manoel) Gomes de Oliveira, S.D.B. (see below 1932.11.18 – 1955.05.12)
- Bishops of Goiás (Roman Rite), below
  - Bishop Emanuel (Manoel) Gomes de Oliveira, S.D.B. (1922.10.27 – 1932.11.18 see above)
  - Bishop Prudencio Gomes da Silva (1907.11.17 – 1921.09.19)
  - Bishop Eduardo Duarte e Silva (1891.01.23 - 1907.11.06), appointed Bishop of Uberaba; future Archbishop
  - Bishop Joaquim Arcoverde de Albuquerque Cavalcanti (1891.06.26 – 1891.10.27); future Archbishop and Cardinal
  - Bishop Cláudio José Gonçalves Ponce de Leão, C.M. (1881.05.13 – 1890.06.26), appointed Bishop of São Pedro do Rio Grande do Sul; future Archbishop
  - Bishop Antônio Maria Corrêa de Sá e Benevides (1876.11.18 – 1877.06.25), appointed Bishop of Mariana
  - Bishop Joaquim Gonçalves de Azevedo (later Archbishop) (1865.09.25 – 1876.12.19), appointed Archbishop of São Salvador da Bahia
  - Bishop Domingos Quirino de Souza (1860.05.04 – 1863.09.12)
  - Bishop Francisco Ferreira de Azevedo (1844.07.29 – 1854.08.12)
  - Bishop Francisco Ferreira de Azevedo (1819.05.29 – 1844.07.29)
- Prelates of Goiás (Roman Rite), below
  - Bishop Antônio Rodrigues de Aguiar (1810.06.24 – 1818.10.03)
  - Bishop Vicente Alexandre de Tovar (1803.06.20 – 1808.10.08)
  - Bishop José Nicolau de Azevedo Coutinho Gentil (1788.03.07 – 1793?)
  - Bishop Vicente do Espirito Santo, O.A.D. (1782.12.17 – 1788.11.29)

=== Auxiliary bishop ===
- Abel Ribeiro Camelo (1947-1957), appointed Bishop of Jataí, Goias (later returned here as Archbishop)

== See also ==
- Our Lady of the Rosary Parish
