= Tulu =

Tulu may refer to:

== Ethnic groups and language ==
- Tulu language, a Dravidian language
- Tulu people, an ethnolinguistic group native to southern India

== People ==
- Derartu Tulu (born 1972), Ethiopian long-distance runner
- Walid Yacoubou (born 1997), Togolese footballer nicknamed "Tulu"

== Places ==
- Tülü, Balakan, Azerbaijan
- Tülü, Lerik, Azerbaijan
- Tulú, Panama
- Tülü, Saimbeyli, Turkey

== See also ==
- Tulu calendar, traditional solar calendar
- Tulu cinema, in India
- Tulu Bolo, a town in Ethiopia
- Tulu Gowda, a community in India
- Tulu Nadu, a Tulu-speaking region in India
