= Coni =

Coni may refer to:

- Cuneo, Italy
- Coni, Azerbaijan
- Italian National Olympic Committee (Italian: Comitato Olimpico Nazionale Italiano)
