= Bakircioglu =

Bakircioglu or Bakırcıoğlu is a surname. Notable people with the surname include:

- Gurgîn Bakircioglu
- Kennedy Bakircioglu (born 1980), Swedish footballer
- Melike Bakırcıoğlu (born 1987), Turkish basketball player

== See also ==
- Bakir
