= Eyüp (disambiguation) =

Eyüp is a district of the city of Istanbul, Turkey.

Eyüp is a Turkish name and may also refer to:

== People ==
- Eyüp (given name)

== Places ==
- Eyüp, a district of Istanbul, Turkey
- Eyüplü, Saimbeyli, a village in Saimbeyli district of Adana Province, Turkey

== Other uses ==
- Eyüpspor, the football team of the district of Eyüp
- Eyüp Cemetery, a historic large burial ground in Eüp district of Istanbul, Turkey
- Eyüp Gondola, a two-station gondola lift line in Eyüp, Istanbul
- Eyüp Sultan Mosque, a mosque in Eyüp district of Istanbul, Turkey
