= Saimbeyli =

Saimbeyli Hadjin • Հաճն
- District and municipality
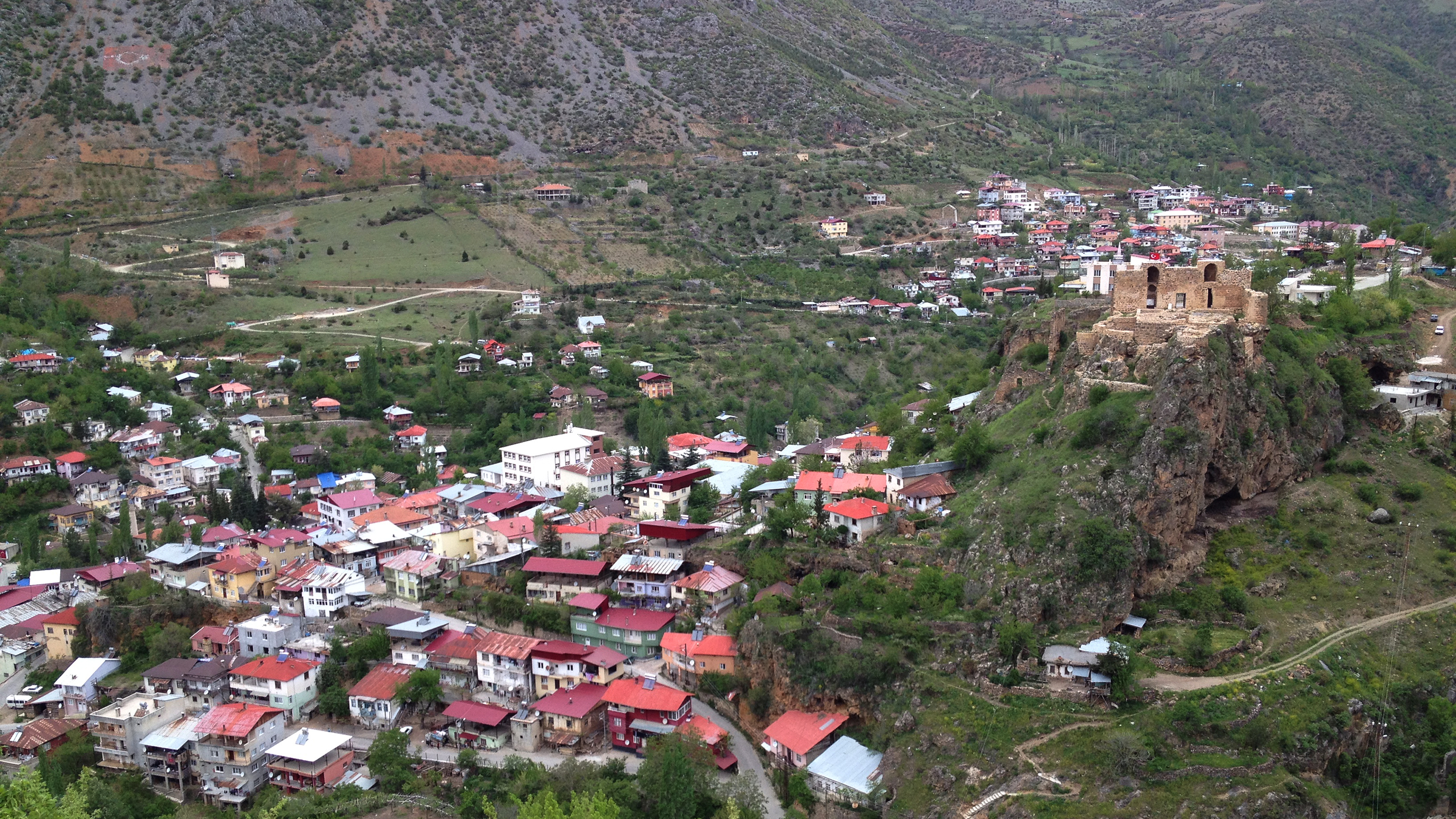
- Partial view of the town

- Map showing Saimbeyli District in Adana Province

- Location within Turkey
- Coordinates: 37°59′N 36°05′E
- Country: Turkey
- Province: Adana

Government
  - Mayor: Mahmut Dal (AK Party)
- Area: 989 km^{2} (382 sq mi)
- Elevation: 1,050 m (3,440 ft)
- Population (2022): 13,621
  - Density: 13.8/km^{2} (35.7/sq mi)
- Time zone: UTC+3 (TRT)
- Postal code: 01740
- Area code: 0322
- Website: www.saimbeyli.bel.tr

Saimbeyli, historically known as Hadjin (Armenian: Հաճըն, romanized: Hačən), is a town and district of Adana Province in present-day Turkey. Its area is 989 km^{2}, and its population is 13,621 (2022). The town is located at the Taurus Mountains of Cilicia region, 157 km north of the city of Adana.

Saimbeyli is perched in a valley between the forested mountains of Dibek and Bakir. There is a pass through the mountains from here to Kayseri and the valley is watered by mountain streams.

It was one of the sites of the 1909 Adana massacres during the Armenian genocide.

== History and monuments ==
The fortress of Saimbeyli may be the castle of Berdus, which appears on the Coronation List of King Levon I of Cilician Armenia in A.D. 1198/99. This fortress, which guards the strategic road between Kayseri to the north and the Rubenid castle of Vahka to the south, stands on the junction of two valleys and two tributaries of the Seyhan River. The plan and masonry of Saimbeyli’s castle are identical to the military architecture in the Armenian Kingdom of Cilicia and undoubtedly date from the mid-12th century to the 13th century.

Opposite and below the fortress are the substantial remains of ecclesiastical and civilian architecture, which date from the 14th through the 19th century.

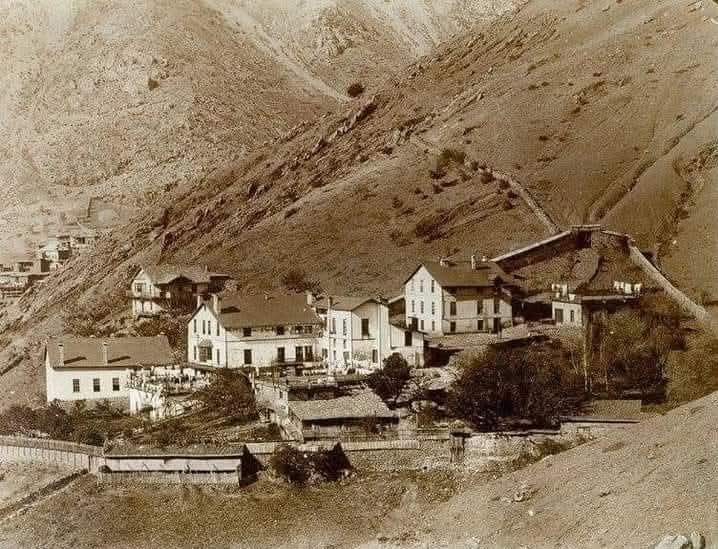
Hadjin American School

An Armenian monastic complex dedicated to St. James is perched on the side of a tall hill at the northwest end of the village. It stood on a 12th century foundation, but it was rebuilt in 1554 by Bishop Khatchadour and was purposefully desecrated during the Adana massacres of the Armenian genocide, leaving little remains.

Violence consumed Marash and Hadjin during the Adana massacres of April 1909, when estimates of the death toll grew to exceed 5,000. Rose Lambert, an American missionary at Hadjin, wrote in her book how many sought refuge in the missionary compound for safety. Reports to British authorities surfaced that imperial Ottoman leaders were "either indifferent or conniving in the slaughter."

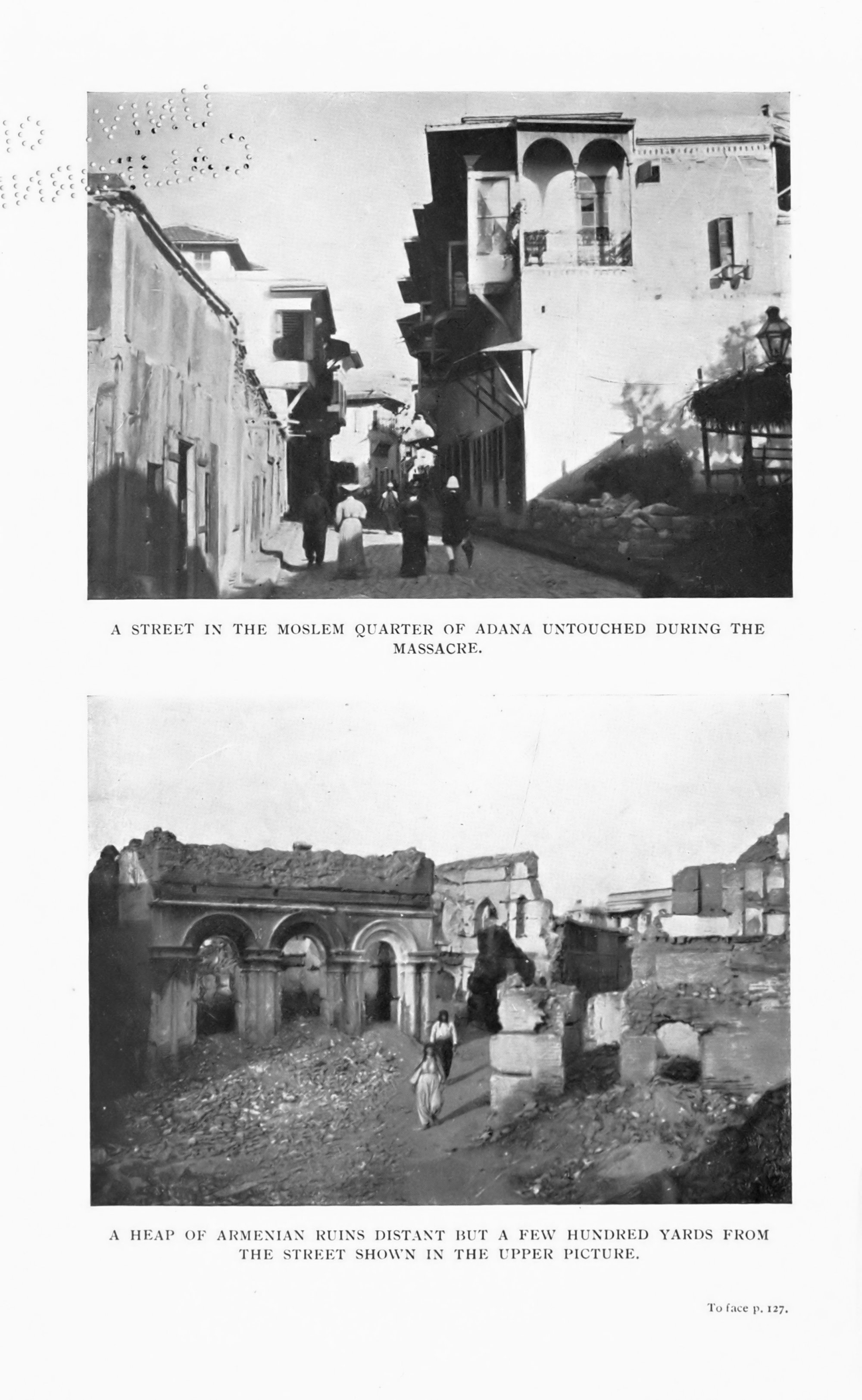
This page from a 1911 publication contrasts the ruins of the Armenian quarter of Adana with an untouched Turkish district nearby.

Some order was restored by April 20, and the British cruiser HMS Swiftsure was able to deliver "provisions and medicines intended for Adana." A "threatening" report from Hadjin indicated that well-armed Armenians were held up in the town, "beleaguered by Moslem tribesmen who are only awaiting sufficient numerical strength to rush the improvised defenses erected by the Armenians." 8,000 such refugees filled the missions of Tarsus, where order had been restored under martial law, the dead numbering approximately 50.

An April 22 message from an American missionary in Hadjin indicated that the town was taking fire intermittently, surrounding Armenian properties had been burned, and that siege was inevitable. The entirety of the Armenian population of Kırıkhan was reported to have been "slaughtered"; the Armenian village of Dörtyol was burning and surrounded; additional bloodshed flared up in Tarsus; massacres were reported in Antioch, and rioting in Birejik.

== Population ==
At the beginning of the 20th century, Hadjin had an Armenian population of around 30,000. The Armenians had six churches, including the main Armenian Apostolic denomination, but also an Armenian Catholic and two Evangelical Armenian churches. The population worked in agriculture and various trades. They were subject to deportations and massacres during the Armenian genocide. After the end of World War I, in 1919, part of the Armenian population returned under the French Protectorate, but the French abandoned the city to Turkish rule, resulting in the Armenian rebellion and the eventual emptying of the city with the arrival of the Kemalist forces. The remaining Armenian population of Hadjin settled in various countries, notably Lebanon, Syria, France, the United States and Latin American countries. They established unions highlighting their city and achievements of its populations.

The Turkish authorities renamed the city Saimbeyli in the name of the Turkish military commander that retook the city under Turkish control.

In 1953, a town called Nor Hachn (New Hadjin) was founded in the Armenian Soviet Socialist Republic (now Armenia) in memory of the city of Hadjin in Turkey. According to a census of 2015, Nor Hachn has a population of 9,400, The town also includes in its population some survivors and descendants of survivors of the genocide and a memorial built in memory of the Armenian victims of Hadjin and the Hadjin resistance. The memorial itself was inaugurated in 1974.

== Composition ==
There are 28 neighbourhoods in Saimbeyli District:

- Aksaağaç
- Avcıpınarı
- Ayvacık
- Beypınarı
- Çatak
- Çeralan
- Çorak
- Cumhurlu
- Değirmenciuşağı
- Eyüplü
- Fatih
- Gökmenler
- Gürleşen
- Halilbeyli
- Himmetli
- İslam
- Kandilli
- Kapaklıkuyu
- Karakuyu
- Kızılağaç
- Mahmutlu
- Naltaş
- Narlıdere
- Topallar
- Tülü
- Yardibi
- Yeniköy
- Yeşilbağlar

== Places of interest ==
- Near the village of Bahçeköyü there is a castle perched on a rock.
- Saimbeyli castle (known as Badimon in the Middle Ages)

== Notable people ==
- Hampar Kelikian, was an Armenian American orthopedic surgeon.
