= Gökmenler, Saimbeyli =

Gökmenler
- Neighbourhood
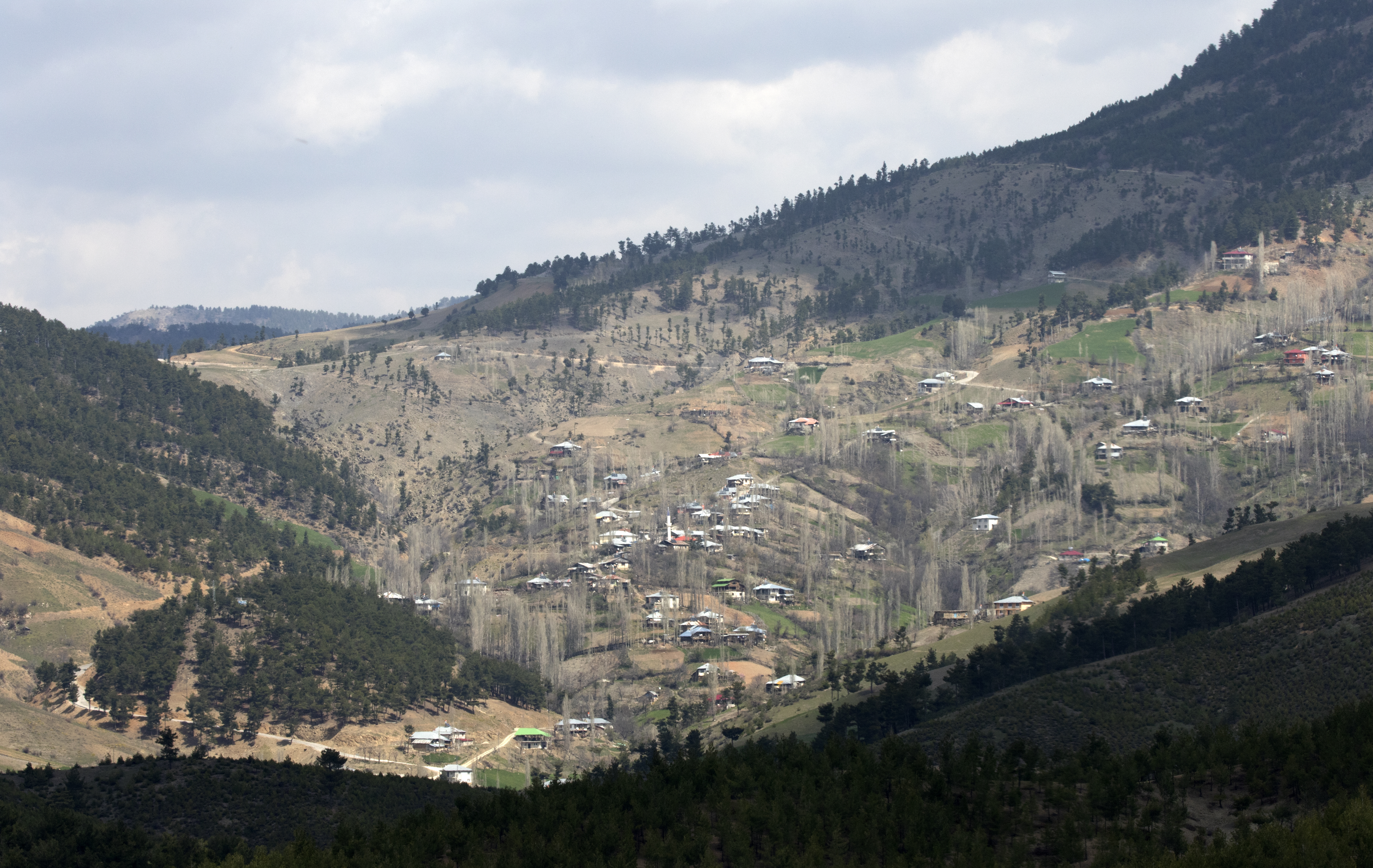

- Location within Turkey
- Coordinates: 38°01′N 35°59′E
- Country: Turkey
- Province: Adana
- District: Saimbeyli
- Population (2022): 515
- Time zone: UTC+3 (TRT)

Gökmenler is a neighbourhood in the municipality and district of Saimbeyli, Adana Province, Turkey. Its population is 515 (2022).
