= Yardibi, Saimbeyli =

Yardibi
- Neighbourhood
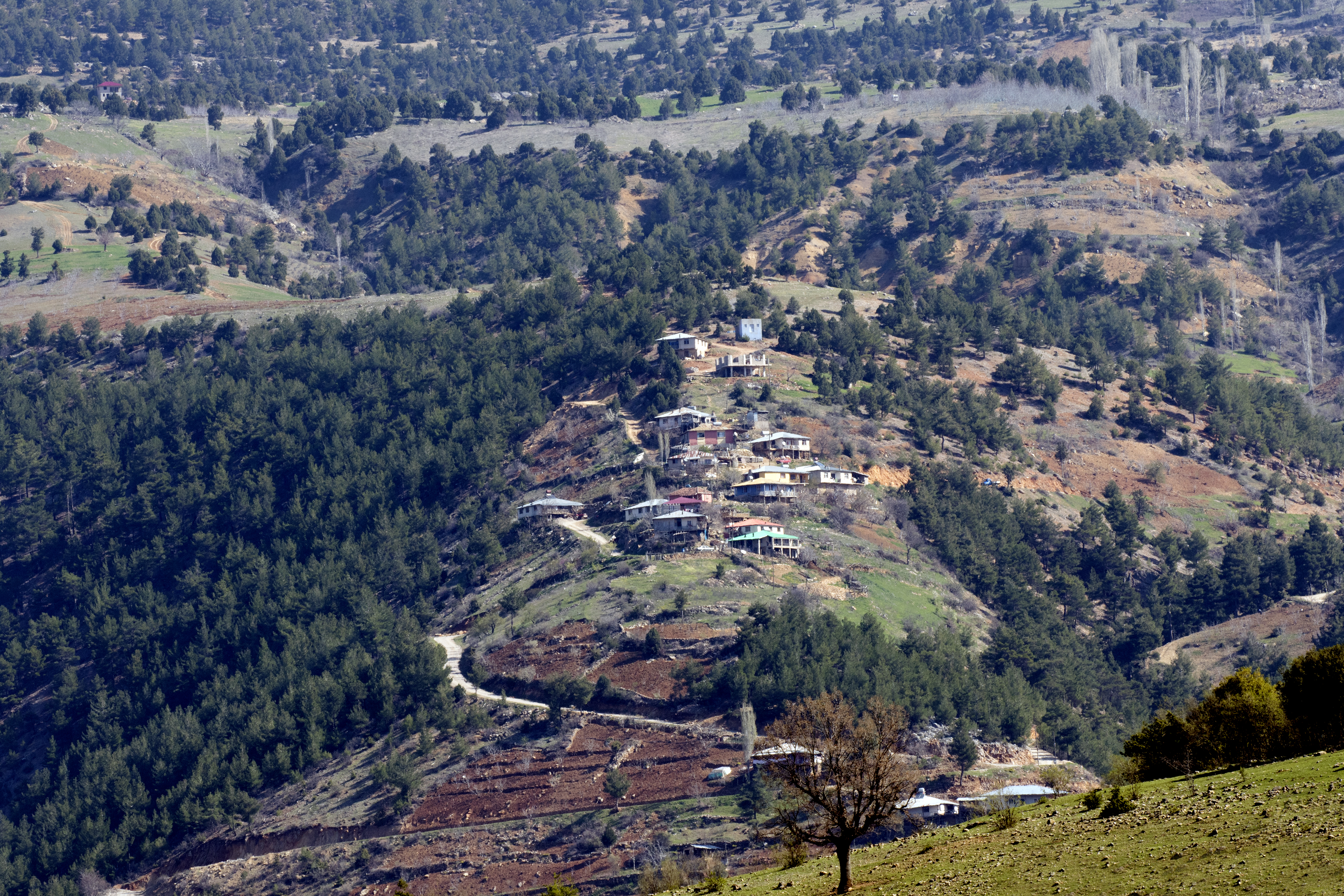

- Location within Turkey
- Coordinates: 37°52′N 36°06′E
- Country: Turkey
- Province: Adana
- District: Saimbeyli
- Population (2022): 612
- Time zone: UTC+3 (TRT)

Yardibi is a neighbourhood in the municipality and district of Saimbeyli, Adana Province, Turkey. Its population is 612 (2022).
