= Beypınarı, Saimbeyli =

Beypınarı
- Neighbourhood
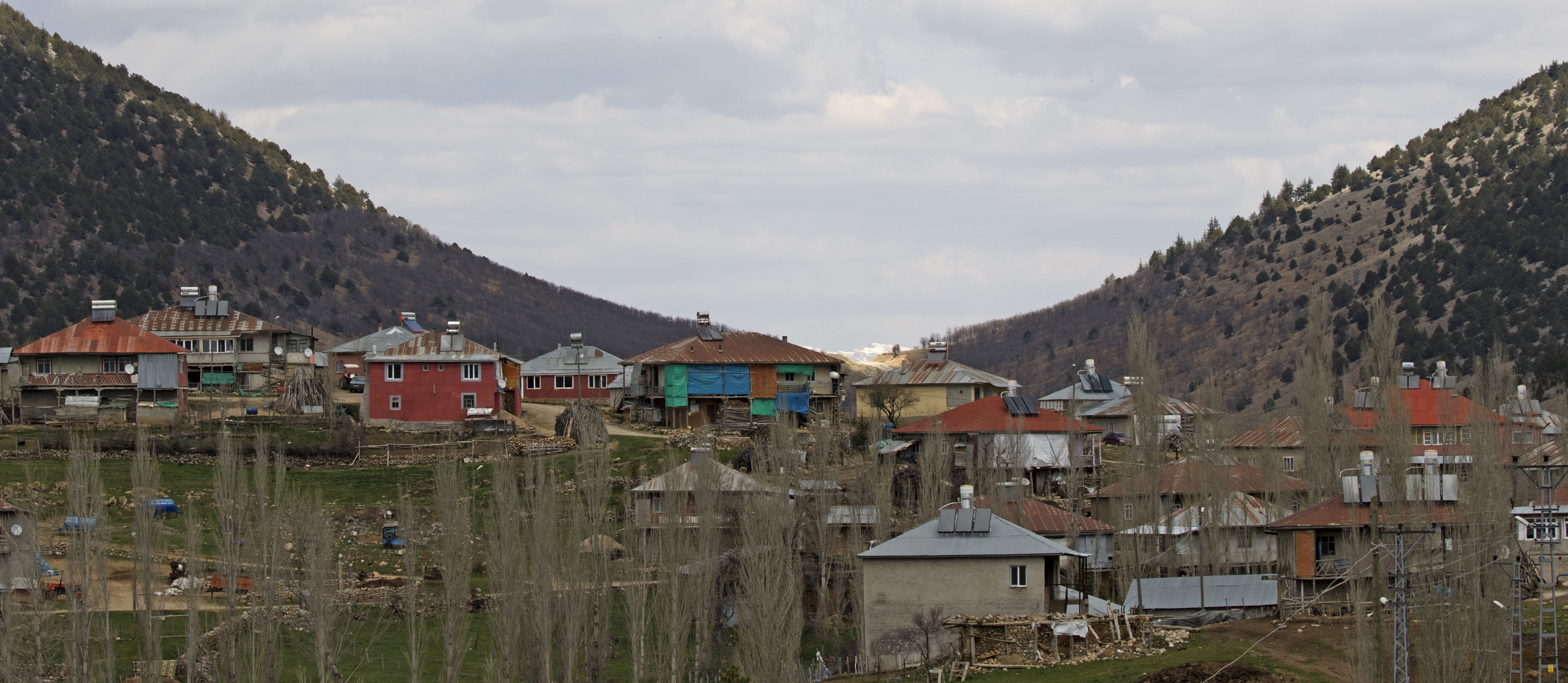

- Location within Turkey
- Coordinates: 38°05′54″N 36°14′05″E
- Country: Turkey
- Province: Adana
- District: Saimbeyli
- Population (2022): 278
- Time zone: UTC+3 (TRT)

Beypınarı is a neighbourhood in the municipality and district of Saimbeyli, Adana Province, Turkey. Its population is 278 (2022).
