= Rose Lambert =

American missionary

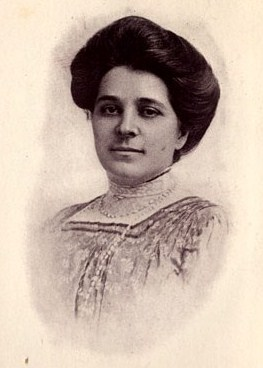
- Born: August 9, 1878; Lehigh County, Pennsylvania, U.S.
- Died: December 27, 1974 (aged 96); Victoria County, Texas, U.S.
- Occupations: Christian missionary and witness to the Adana massacre

Rose Lambert (September 8, 1878 – December 27, 1974) was an American missionary in the Ottoman Empire who was the Matron of the orphanage in Hadjin during and after the 1909 massacres of Armenians in Cilicia. Her accounts of the Hadjin siege and Adana massacre provide an important insight into these events.

== Early life ==
Lambert was born on September 8, 1878, in Lehigh County, Pennsylvania, the daughter of George and Amanda Lambert. Her father was a minister in the Mennonite Brethren in Christ Church. She graduated from the Deaconess Hospital in Cleveland, Ohio, and then became a teacher in Indiana.

== Turkish mission ==
On November 12, 1898, Lambert went to the Ottoman Empire to work among the Armenian orphans of the Hamidian massacres. She arrived in Hadjin on December 28. By autumn 1899, she had 175 orphans under her care. Eventually, two orphanages were opened, one for boys and another for girls. By 1905, the total number of orphans reached 305.

== Hadjin siege and Adana massacre ==
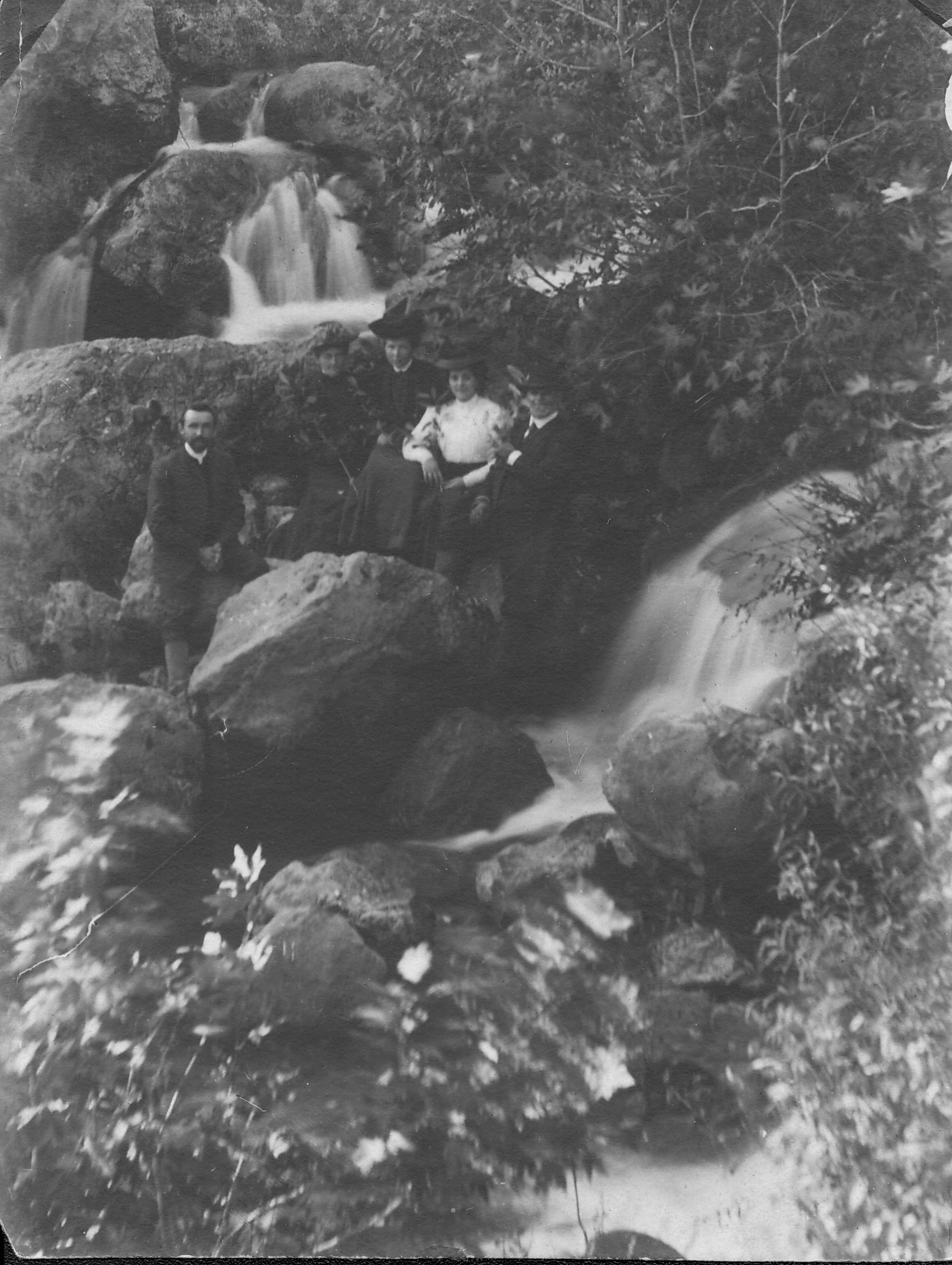
Lambert with her father and others at Hadjin Spring. From left to right are: Henry Maurer, Fredericka Honk, Ida Tschumi, Rose Lambert, and George Lambert.

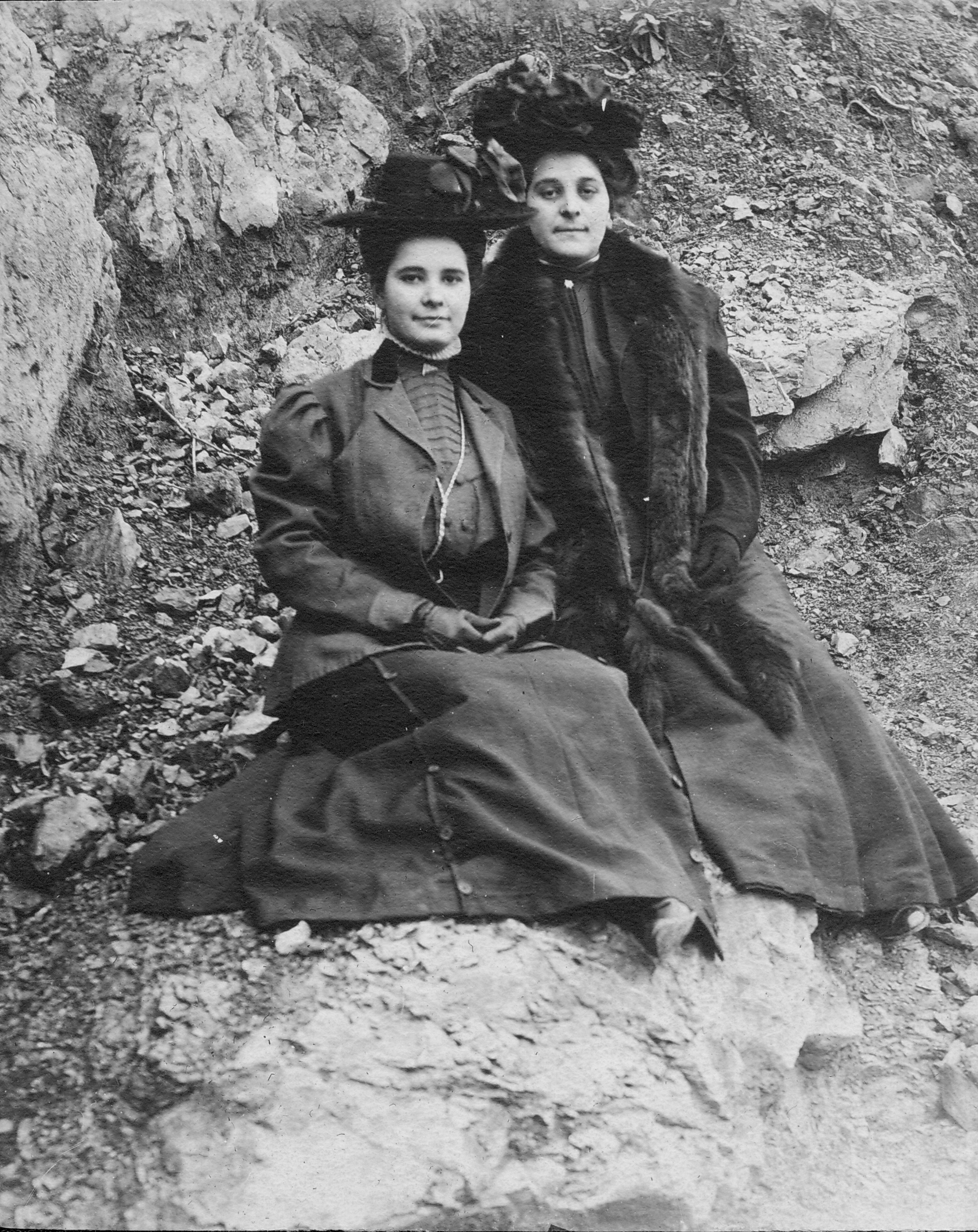
Norah and Rose Lambert, c. 1909

In June 1908, the Ittihad or Young Turks movement overthrew Sultan Abdul Hamid II and declared the return of constitutional rule, promising equality for all citizens of Turkey regardless of religion. The improved status of Armenians and other Christian groups under the new regime caused alarm among some provincial Turkish leaders, who feared the loss of their relatively privileged position in society. On 13 April 1909, a countercoup occurred and Hamid II was briefly returned to power, but although the countercoup collapsed after only a few days, turmoil continued throughout the country. Rumours that Armenians were planning an insurrection or that they were committing atrocities against Turks, spread through the countryside, and shortly after the launch of Hamid's coup, fighting broke out between Turkish and Armenian residents of Adana, which quickly turned into a massacre of Armenians in the town and surrounding villages. News of killings of Armenians soon reached the neighbouring town of Hadjin, where Lambert was still employed in her missionary work, through telegrams and via a trickle of accounts from refugees.

With the central government unable to restore order in the provinces for several weeks, Hadjin fell under prolonged siege from armed Turkish villagers—many of them equipped with modern Martini rifles. Unlike Adana however—a city on a plain with a substantial Armenian minority—Hadjin, as an ethnically homogenous town of some 20,000 Armenians situated high in the mountains, was a much more defensible locality. Nonetheless, Hadjin was in a perilous position as its residents were poorly armed and isolated from help. Throughout the siege, they made frantic efforts via telegraph and messenger to enlist aid both from the central government and foreign embassies. Matters were further complicated by the fact that the defence of the town was apparently misinterpreted by some in the central government not as a defence but as a rebellion.

During the siege, Lambert became an important source of news to the outside world. Her reports of the massacres and the plight of the Hadjin Armenians, telegraphed to the American consulate, were published in The New York Times. In one telegram published in the Times on April 23, 1909, Lambert wrote:

Hadjin has been surrounded for a week by the villagers of this district, who are awaiting the opportunity to storm the place. All roads are closed, and shots are being fired into the town irregularly. The dwellings on the outskirts have been burned. The authorities at Adana have been appealed to for aid, which has not been sent. A rumor from the outside says that an assault will be made on this place to-night.

A telegram was then sent from Lambert on April 26 and arrived to the United States on April 28. The telegram read in part:

The rising against the Christians of Hadjin began nine days ago. The Government sent troops to suppress the fighting between Mohammedans and Christians, but the men were not strong enough numerically to restore order. Many are dead and wounded on both sides. Desperados occupied the Armenian cloister five days ago, and have been firing on the people without interruption since...Many shops have been robbed and others undoubtedly will be. The Armenian settlements and villages in the province have been burned and many persons killed.

Lambert later wrote a book, Hadjin and the Armenian Massacres, in which she gave a more detailed account of her experiences in Hadjin during the 1909 turmoil. Lambert states that, though fired upon day and night, Hadjin's defenders were instructed not to shoot directly at their attackers unless absolutely necessary, as it was anticipated that the more Turks killed during the defence, the harsher would be retribution from the authorities and the Armenians' Turkish neighbors in the aftermath. Lambert also relates how after many attempts to raise the alarm, a regiment of 300 soldiers was dispatched from Feke to end the siege, but instead of dispersing the besiegers, the regiment apparently joined them. Finally, after several weeks, the British consul, who had been informed of the siege by telegraph, was able to organize a relief force of a Turkish regiment led by a reliable officer, which quickly dispersed the besiegers and restored order. It was at this point that news of the massacre of up to 30,000 Armenians in the neighboring locality of Adana reached Hadjin. Lambert wrote:

Scarcely had the regiment arrived when news reached us of the awful massacre on the plain. Many Christian villages were completely wiped out and not one Armenian left alive. Where there was a mixed population the Armenian quarter was usually destroyed but here and there were places where no great harm was done simply because the officer in charge would not consent to it. Widows and orphans by the hundreds came flocking back to Hadjin and the villages about us, from the plain, bereft of beloved ones, many of whom had been brutally massacred before their eyes. They were penniless, ragged, barefooted, sick, pale and almost beyond recognition, the mothers, wives, sisters and daughters of the three thousand Hadjin men who had been massacred on the plain.

== Aftermath ==
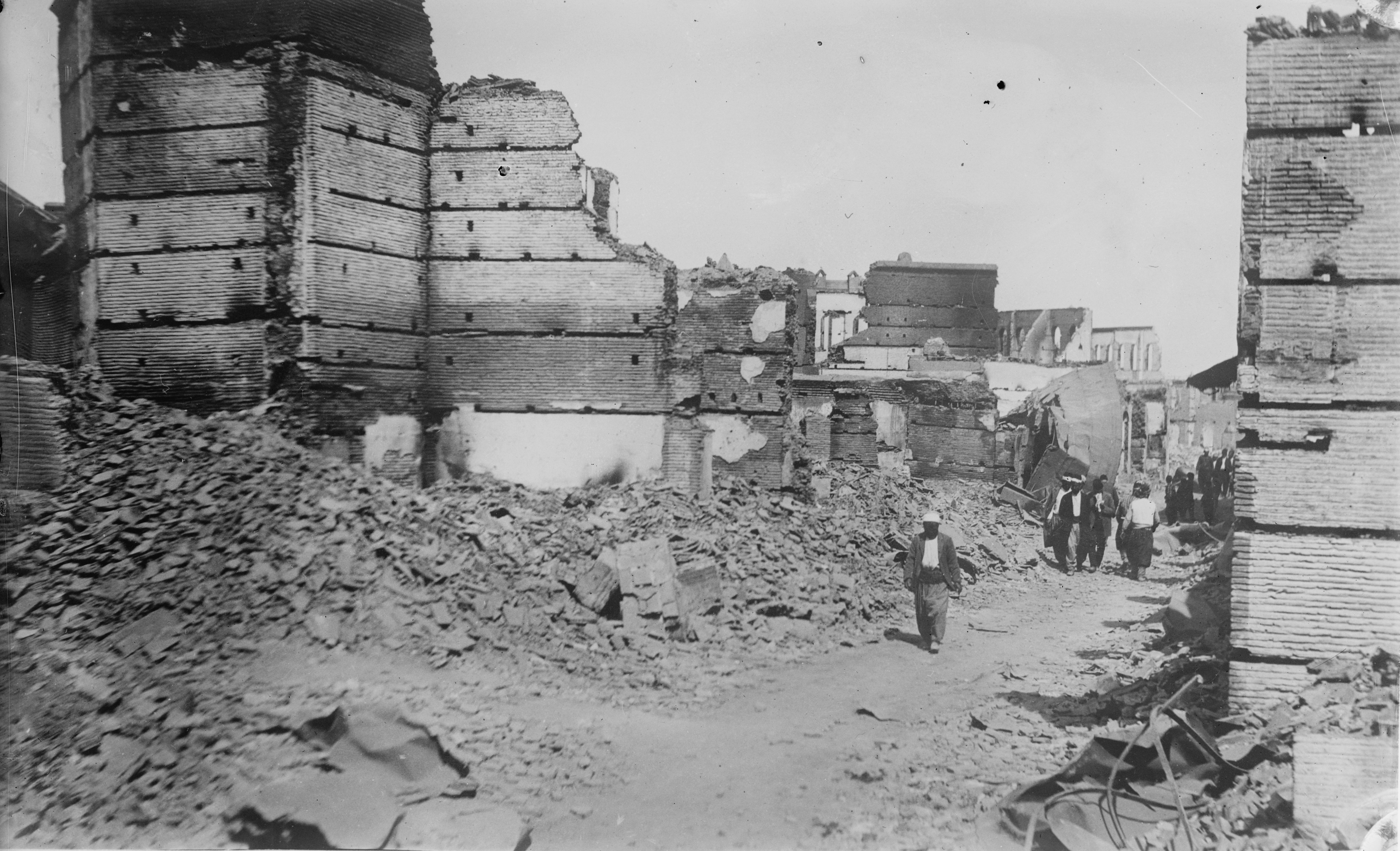
A street in the Christian quarter of Adana after the massacres, c. 1909

With the siege ended, martial law was established and "a number of the principal village Turks were called to give an account of their deeds." In their defence, these men testified that they had been driven to violence by false reports of Armenian atrocities and humiliations, and all, according to Lambert, were subsequently pardoned after being given "a little advice". In contrast with the lenient treatment extended to local Turkish offenders, 70 of the Armenian defenders of Hadjin, including the mayor and his son, city councillors, local defence leaders, and even those who supplied provisions to the defenders including the baker, were imprisoned in harsh conditions awaiting trial, some of them allegedly tortured to extract confessions. While most were released after a few months, several received ten-year jail sentences.

Lambert's book closes with a number of personal stories related to her by survivors of the massacres. Of particular interest to Lambert was the fate of a number of her associates, including "our ministers, delegates, deacons, merchants and the head teacher in our girls' orphanage, numbering seventy-six in all." According to testimony supplied to Lambert, this group, after falling into the hands of a local Turkish leader, were initially promised protection in return for surrendering all their weapons and other possessions, but on doing so were brutally slaughtered by their captors.

Lambert concludes her book as follows:

Space will not permit me to write in detail of the many who were crucified, thrown into the river, killed with swords and axes, burned by the thousands in the churches or in their homes, and of the many who were tortured and killed in such hideous and awful ways that dare not be repeated, but it is estimated that in the vilayet of Adana between twenty and thirty thousand were slain and months later the plain was still strewn with their bones. On our trip to the coast, while resting under the large shade trees for a few moments, Armenian hands gathered the skulls and bones of their fellow countrymen and laid them at our feet.

To a friend, she wrote: "I did my utmost for [the Armenians] and at the time felt it would be much easier to be with the martyrs than to live with the memories of the atrocities."

Lambert returned to the United States in 1910, and married Texas rancher David Musselman the following year, on October 4, 1911. They had five children, David, George, Paul, Rose and John.

== Death ==
Rose Lambert Musselmann died in 1974 at age 96.

== Legacy ==
In H. Poghosyan's book, published in 1942, The General History of Hadjin (Հաճընի ընդհանուր պատմութիւնը եւ շրջակայ Գօզան-Տաղի հայ գիւղերը), Rose Lambert was described as a "Saviour Angel for many during the self-defence of Hadjin".
