= Adana massacre =

1909 massacres of Armenian, Assyrian, and Greek civilians by Ottoman Muslims

Adana massacres
- Part of the Armenian, Assyrian, and Greek genocides; the late Ottoman genocides
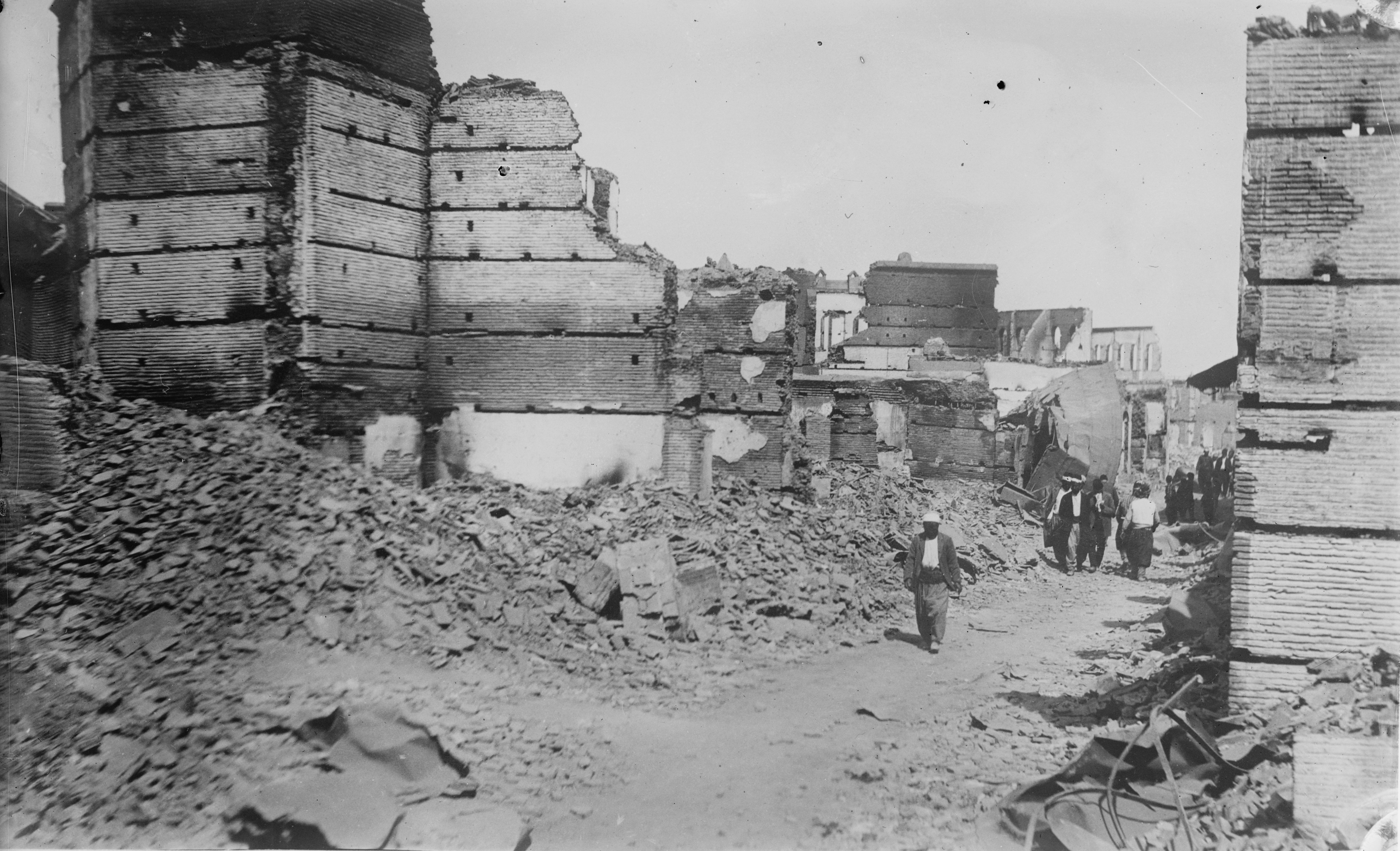
- Location: Adana Vilayet, Ottoman Empire (present-day Turkey)
- Date: April 1909
- Target: Mostly Armenians, but also Greeks and Assyrians
- Attack type: Pogrom, genocidal massacre, ethnic cleansing
- Deaths: 20,000–30,000
- Injuries: Unknown
- Perpetrators: Factions of the Committee of Union and Progress, Ottoman Turkish civilians
- Motive: Anti-Christian sentiment, ethnic cleansing, Turkification, forced acquisition of property, business, and agricultural resources

The Adana massacre (Armenian: Ադանայի կոտորած; Turkish: Adana Katliamı) occurred in the Adana vilayet of the Ottoman Empire in April 1909. Many Armenians were slain by Ottoman Muslims in the city of Adana as the Ottoman countercoup of 1909 triggered a series of pogroms throughout the province. Between 20,000 and 30,000 ethnic Armenians, 1,300 Assyrians and 1,250 Greeks were killed and tortured in Adana and the surrounding towns. Unlike the previous Hamidian massacres, the events were not officially organized by the central government, but culturally instigated via local officials, Islamic clerics, and supporters of the Committee of Union and Progress (CUP).

After revolutionary groups had secured the deposition of Sultan Abdul Hamid II and the restoration of the Second Constitutional Era (Ottoman Empire) in 1908, a military revolt directed against the Committee of Union and Progress seized Constantinople. While the revolt lasted only ten days, it reignited anti-Armenian sentiment in the region and precipitated the mass destruction of Armenian businesses and farms, public hangings, sexual violence, and executions rooted in political, economic, and religious prejudice. These massacres continued for more than one month.

In July 1909, the Young Turk government announced the trials of various government and military officials, for being implicated in the massacres, but they did not convict the perpetrators, causing them to go unpunished and Turkish nationalism becoming stronger. The modern Turkish government and certain Turkish nationalists, deny the massacre happened.

== Background ==
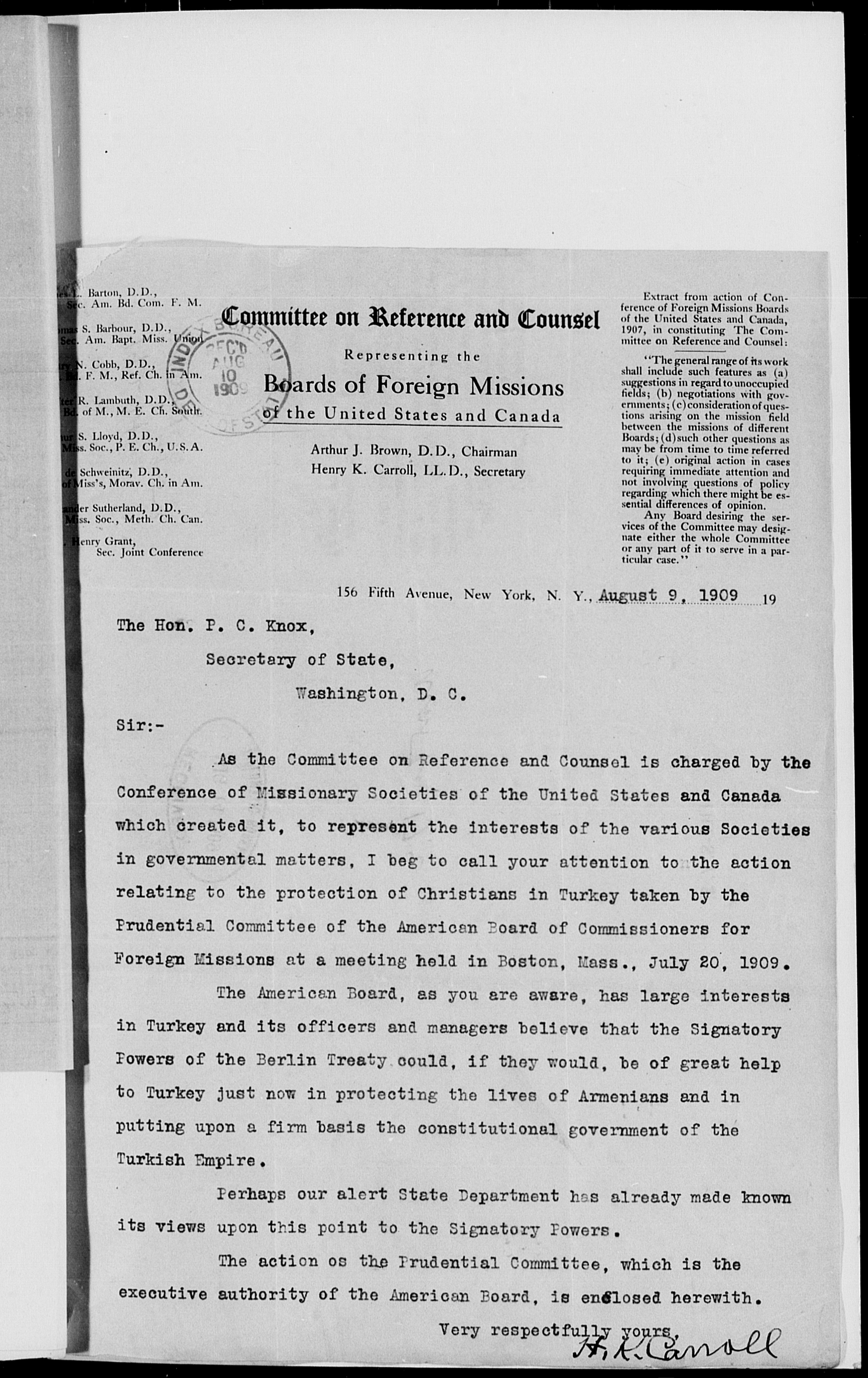
Henry K. Carroll of the Boards of Foreign Missions pleading to the US Secretary of State for protection of Christians with the Ottoman Empire.

After the Hamidian massacres, the Great Powers (Britain, France, Russia) forced Abdul Hamid II to sign a new reform package designed to curtail the powers of the Hamidiye in October 1895 which, like the Berlin treaty, was never implemented. On 1 October 1895, two thousand Armenians assembled in Constantinople (Istanbul) to petition for the implementation of the reforms, but Ottoman police units converged on the rally and violently broke it up. Upon receiving the reform package, the sultan remarked, "This business will end in blood."

In 1908, the Committee of Union and Progress came to power in the Young Turk Revolution. Within a year, the Ottoman Empire's Armenian population, empowered by the dismissal of Abdul Hamid II, began organizing politically in support of the new government, which promised to place them on equal legal footing with their Muslim counterparts.

Having long endured so-called dhimmi status, and having suffered the brutality and oppression of Hamidian leadership since 1876, the Armenians in Cilicia welcomed the liberal reforms proposed by the nascent Young Turk government. With Christians now being granted the right to arm themselves and form politically significant groups, it was not long before Abdul Hamid loyalists, themselves acculturated into the system that had perpetrated the Hamidian massacres of the 1890s, came to view the empowerment of the Christians as coming at their expense.

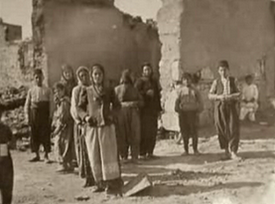
An Armenian town pillaged and destroyed during the Adana massacre.

The countercoup of 1909 wrested control of the government from the secularist Young Turks, and Abdul Hamid II briefly recovered his dictatorial powers. Appealing to the reactionary Muslim population with populist rhetoric calling for the re-institution of Islamic law under the banner of a pan-Islamic caliphate, the Sultan mobilized popular support against the Young Turks by identifying himself with the historically Islamic character of the state.

Many of the Christian Armenians were hopeful of more equality after the coup against Sultan Abdul Hamid II, which removed the Islamic head of state from power. However, the rise of Turkish nationalism and a popular perception of the Armenians as a separatist, European-controlled entity contributed to the malevolence of their attackers.

=== Causes ===
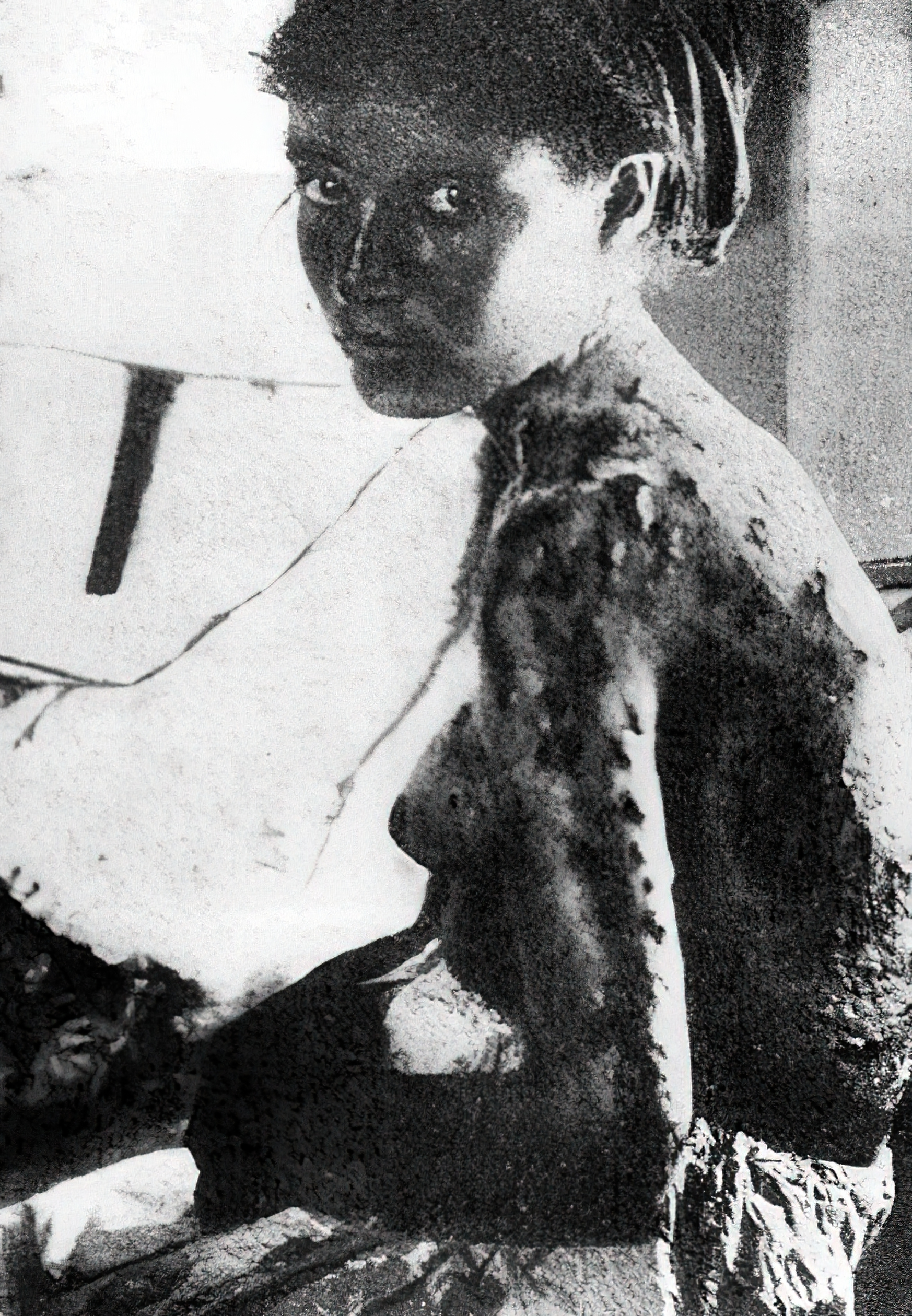
An Armenian woman from Adana, tortured and maimed by knife wounds

When news of a mutiny in Constantinople (now Istanbul) arrived in Adana, speculation circulated among the Muslim population of an imminent Armenian insurrection. By April 14 the Armenian quarter was attacked by a Muslim mob, and many thousands of Armenians were killed in the ensuing weeks.

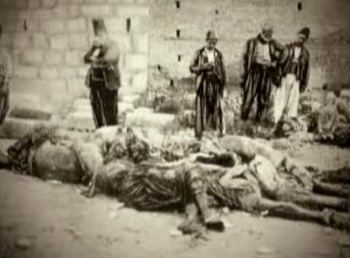
Bodies of Armenians killed during a clash in Adana.

Other reports emphasize that a "skirmish between Armenians and Turks on April 13 set off a riot that resulted in the pillaging of the bazaars and attacks upon the Armenian quarters." Two days later, more than 2,000 Armenians had been killed.

In his August 1909 report on the massacre, Charles Doughty-Wylie asserts that "The theory of an armed revolution on the part of the Armenians is now generally discredited with the more intelligent people." Doughty-Wylie explained that an uprising could not be said to be taking place without some concentration of forces, or without any effort to make use of the various available strongholds, and in any case the number of Armenians would be "an easy match for the regular Ottoman army. ...They would not have left their sons and brothers scattered widely through the province for harvest without arms, without any hope of escape."

During the decline of the Ottoman Empire, the Armenians were targeted owing to their relative wealth, and their quarrels with imperial taxation under the millet system.

A report by the Acting British Vice-Consul at Konieh and Mersina, Major Charles Doughty-Wylie considers "The Causes of the Massacre". From this document the historian Vahakn Dadrian culls the text:

The Turks, masters for centuries, found their great stumbling block in equality with the Christians... Among the fiercer professors of Islam resentment grew. Were God's adversaries to be the equals of Islam? In every cafe the heathen were speaking great mouthing words of some godless and detested change...

Abdul Hamid became celebrated, in this context, according to Doughty-Wylie, because he "had set the fashion of massacres".

Stephan Astourian has meanwhile highlighted other causes, including growing resentment among Muslims as a result of increasing Armenian Christian immigration into Adana, Armenian landholders' introduction of new technological machinery that would displace a great many Turkish artisans and craftsmen, and a popular rumor that a well-known Armenian landowner was to be crowned the ruler of an Armenian kingdom of Cilicia.

== Bloodshed ==
Armenian quarters burnt during the massacre.

Nearly 4,437 Armenian dwellings were torched which meant nearly half the town was razed, which led in turn to descriptions of the incidents as a "holocaust". The tension erupted into riots on April 1, 1909, which soon escalated into organized violence against the Armenian population of Adana and in several surrounding cities. By April 18, over 1,000 people were reported dead at Adana alone, with additional unknown casualties in Tarsus and Alexandretta. Thousands of refugees filled the American embassy in Alexandretta, and a British warship was dispatched to its shores; three French warships were dispatched to Mersin, where the situation was "desperate", and many Western consulates were overwhelmed by Armenian refugees.

Similar violence consumed Marash and Hadjin, and the estimates of the death toll soon grew to exceed 5,000. Rose Lambert, an American missionary at Hadjin, wrote in her book how many sought refuge in the missionary compound for safety. The British cruiser HMS Diana was hoped would provide a "tranquilizing" effect at the port of Alexandretta, where violence still raged. Reports surfaced that imperial "authorities are either indifferent or conniving in the slaughter." The Armenian quarter of Adana was described as the "richest and most prosperous"; the violence included destruction of "tractors and other kinds of mechanized equipment."

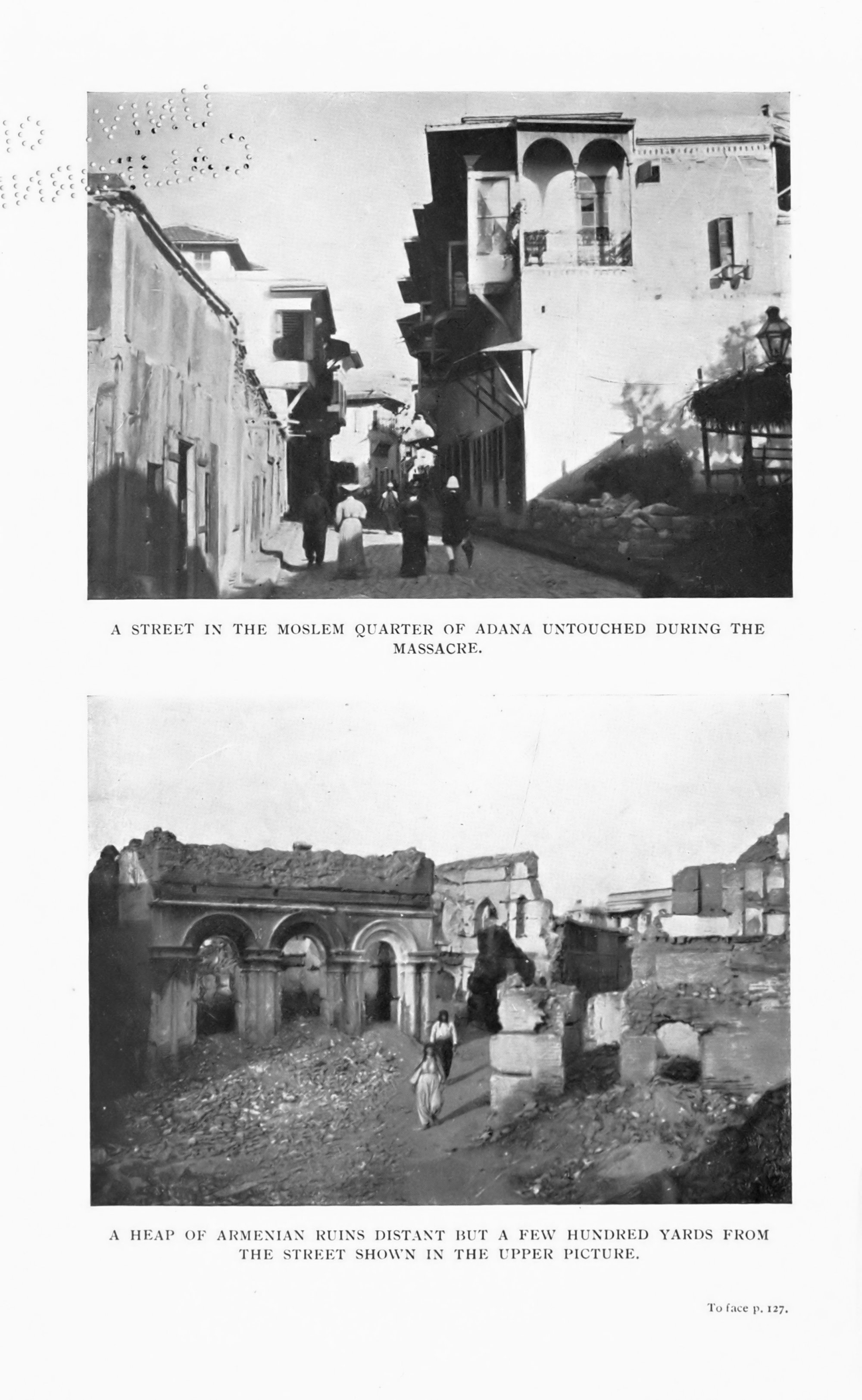
This page from a 1911 publication contrasts the ruins of the Armenian quarter of Adana with an untouched Turkish district nearby.

Some order was restored by April 20, as the disturbance in Mersina had abated, and the British cruiser HMS Swiftsure was able to deliver "provisions and medicines intended for Adana." A "threatening" report from Hadjin indicated that well-armed Armenians were held up in the town, "beleaguered by Moslem tribesmen who are only awaiting sufficient numerical strength to rush the improvised defenses erected by the Armenians." 8,000 refugees filled the missions of Tarsus, where order had been restored under martial law, the dead numbering approximately 50.

An April 22 message from an American missionary in Hadjin indicated that the town was taking fire intermittently, that surrounding Armenian properties had been burned, and that siege was inevitable. The entirety of the Armenian population of Kırıkhan was reported to have been "slaughtered"; the Armenian village of Dörtyol was burning and surrounded; additional bloodshed flared up in Tarsus; massacres were reported in Antioch, and rioting in Birejik. At least one report praised the "Turkish Government officials at Mersina" for doing "everything possible to check the trouble", though "the result of their efforts has been very limited". As Ottoman authorities worked to contain violence directed at the Christians of the Empire, the Armenian population "look(ed) to the Young Turks for future protection."

An American missionary stationed in Tarsus but visiting Adana during the period, Reverend Herbert Adams Gibbons of Hartford, described the scene in the days leading up to the 27th of April:

Adana is in a pitiable condition. The town has been pillaged and destroyed ... It is impossible to estimate the number of killed. The corpses lie scattered through the streets. Friday, when I went out, I had to pick my way between the dead to avoid stepping on them. Saturday morning I counted a dozen cartloads of Armenian bodies in one-half hour being carried to the river and thrown into the water. In the Turkish cemeteries, graves are being dug wholesale. ... On Friday afternoon 250 so-called Turkish reserves, without officers, seized a train at Adana and compelled the engineer to convey them to Tarsus, where they took part in the complete destruction of the Armenian quarter of that town, which is the best part of Tarsus. Their work of looting was thorough and rapid.

The Ottoman government sent in the Army to keep peace, but it was alleged to have either tolerated the violence or participated in it. An unsigned newspaper report of 3 May 1909 indicated that Ottoman soldiery had arrived, but did not seem intent upon effecting a peace:

Adana is terrorized by 4,000 soldiers, who are looting, shooting, and burning. No respect is paid to foreign properties. Both French schools have been destroyed, and it is feared that the American school, commercial, and missionary interests in Adana are totally ruined. The new Governor has not as yet inspired confidence. There is reason to believe that the authorities still intend to permit the extermination of all Christians.

== Aftermath ==
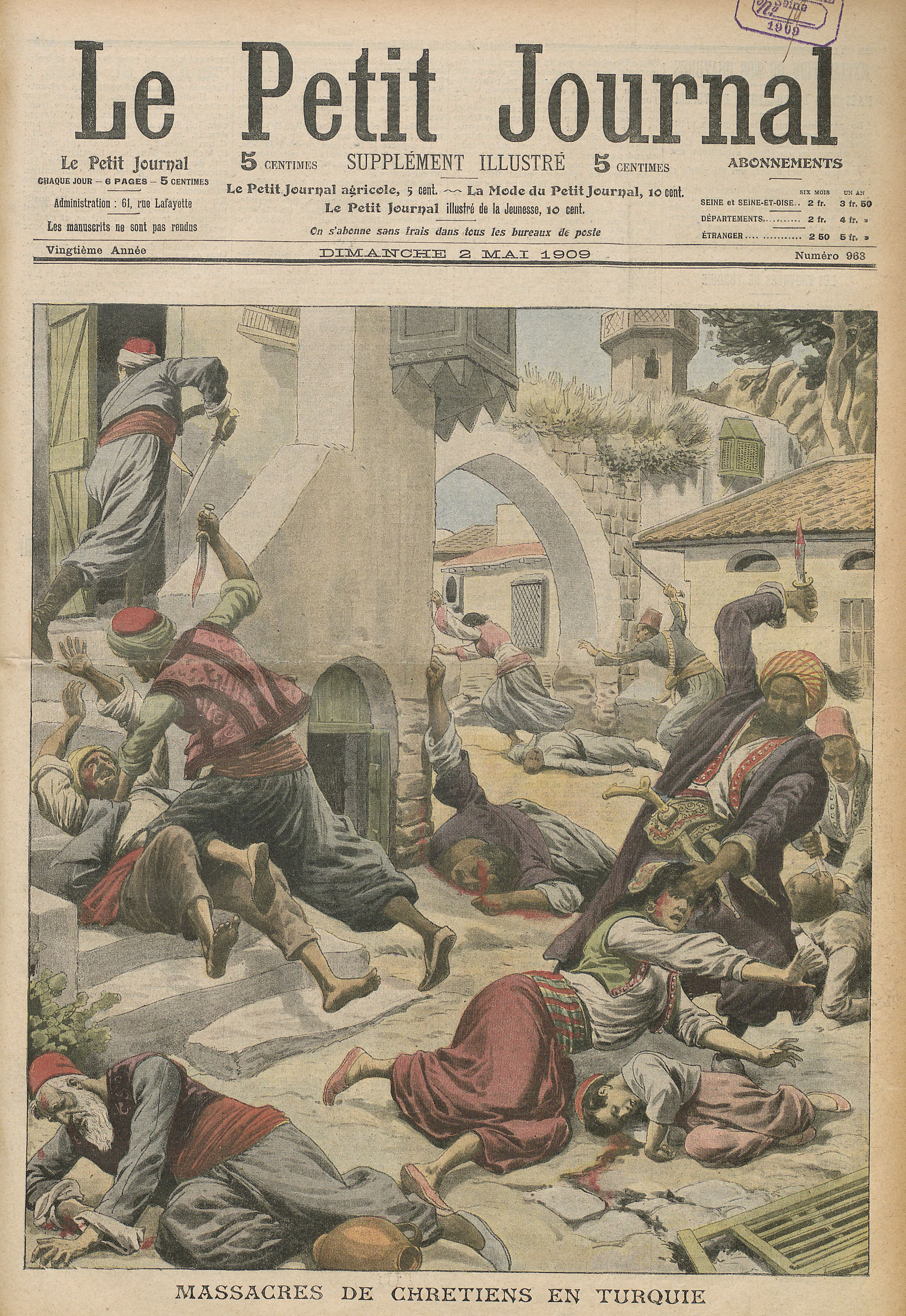
The Adana massacre on the front cover of the Le Petit Journal

According to the official Ottoman data, there were a total of 3,521 casualties in Adana city. Of these, 2,093 were Armenians, 782 Muslims, 613 Assyrians and 33 Greeks. Government figures are based on records of the registry office, and lists compiled by Mukhtars and priests of certain localities.

Grand Vizier Hüseyin Hilmi Pasha indicated that the massacre was a "political, not a religious question ... Before the Armenian political committees began to organize in Asia Minor there was peace. I will leave you to judge the cause of the bloodshed." While conceding that his predecessor, Abdul Hamid II, had ordered the "extermination of the Armenians", he did articulate his confidence that "there will never be another massacre."

In July 1909, the Young Turk government announced the trials of various government and military officials, for "being implicated in the Armenian massacres". In the ensuing courts-martial, 124 Muslims and seven Armenians were executed for their involvement in the violence.

In response to the counterrevolution and the Armenian massacres in Adana, the CUP and Dashnak concluded an agreement in September 1909 whereby they promised to "work together for progress, the Constitution, and unity." Both parties declared that rumor of Armenian efforts toward independence were false. The Unionists took care to have an Armenian minister present in the governments formed after 6 August 1909, which could also be interpreted as an attempt to demonstrate the CUP's distance from the Adana events.

The government of Turkey, as well as some Turkish writers and nationalists, deny the massacre happened, claiming that the events of April 1909 were in fact an Armenian "rampage of pillaging and death" targeting the Muslim population that "ended up with about 17,000 Armenian and 1,850 Turkish deaths." Historians question the factuality of the Turkish claims of an "Armenian rampage" due to the simple fact that if the Armenians had been the aggressors, significantly higher number of Turks would have been killed. In contrast to Turkey's official position, foreign eyewitnesses clearly stated that Armenians were the victims.

The Sublime Porte claimed that the loss of the Muslims was greater than the loss of Armenians, 1,900 Muslims as compared to 1,500 Armenians.

Another Ottoman commission was composed of Faik Bey, Mosdijian Efendi and Esad Rauf Bey, the Governor of Mersin. Using local registers, they calculated the number of deaths as at least 4,196 non-Muslims and 1,487 Muslims, including gendarmes and soldiers, and proposed the total figure of 15,000 when accounting for non-registered and migrant workers, including Muslims.

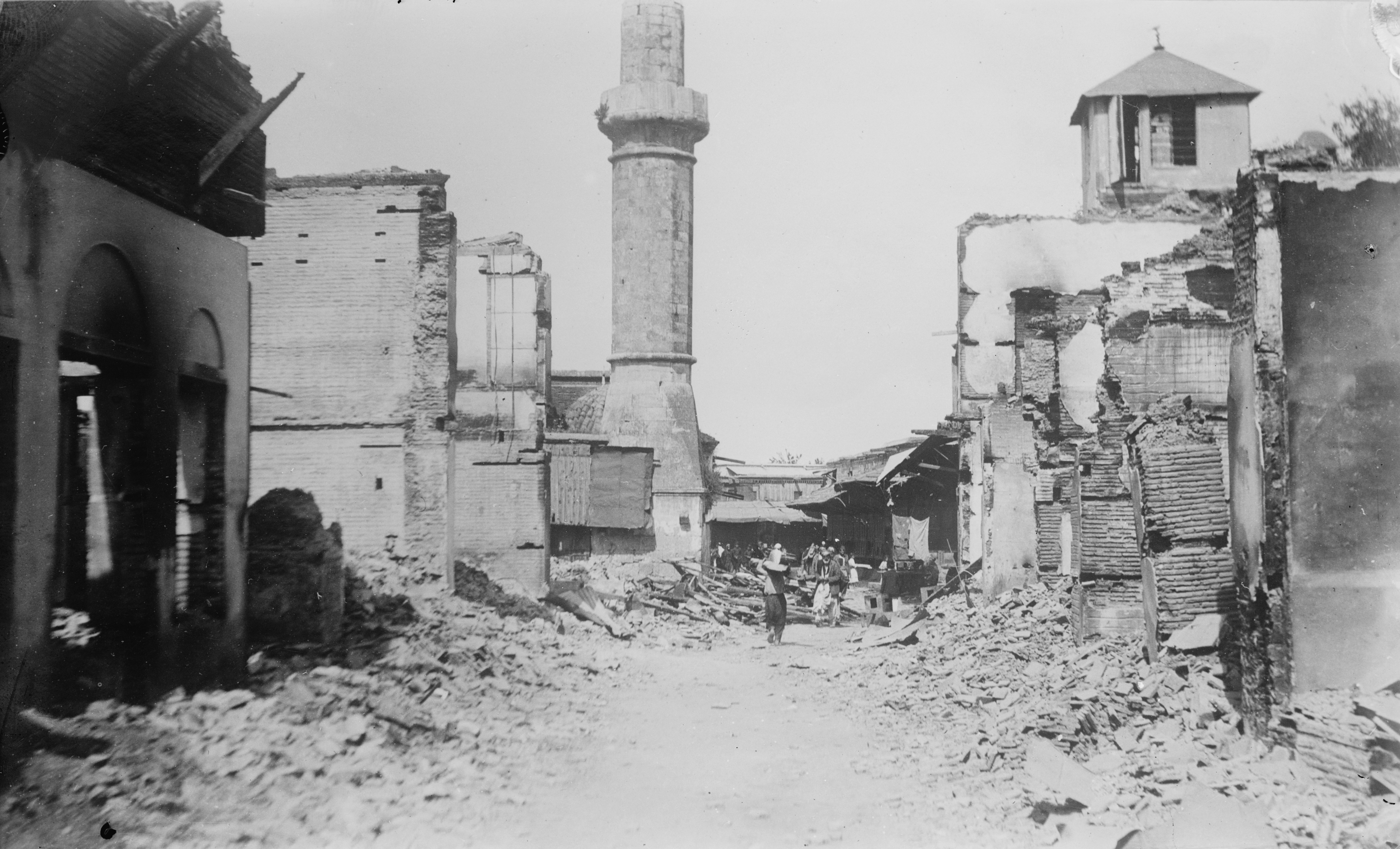
Ruins of a street in the Christian section of Adana. Ottoman government forces fired upon Christians from the minaret at center.

Ottoman authorities denied responsibility in the shooting deaths of two American missionaries in the city of Adana, indicating instead that "the Armenians" killed Protestant missionaries D.M. Rogers and Henry Maurer while they "were helping to put out a fire in the house of a Turkish widow." The Ottoman account of the killings was later contradicted by an eyewitness, American priest Stephen Trowbridge of Brooklyn. Trowbridge indicated that the men were killed by "Moslems" as they attempted to extinguish a fire that threatened to consume their mission.

Firing and fighting began April 14 between Moslems and Armenians, which resulted in a number of casualties on both sides... the next morning April 15, a fresh outburst of smoke near the girls' school showed that we were threatened by fire...Mr. Maurer and I took a crowbar and an axe to the destroy the wooden porches, shutters and stairways of the houses between the fires and the girls' school...When I first climbed to the roofs near the flames armed Moslems appeared...When they understood that I was not firing on them, but had come to work against the flames, they lowered their rifles and assured me with many pledges that I might go unmolested...we repeatedly begged some Armenian young men who were lurking around the street corners shielded from the Moslem fire to put away their arms and come and save the school building... we came back to the school and asked for volunteers, Mr. Rogers came at once... We had thus worked a considerable time without being harmed by the Moslems when the Armenians on the other end of the street commenced firing on the houses where the looters were at work. Suddenly two shots rang out not more than eight yards from where we were working. Mr. Rogers...was mortally wounded...The other bullet hit Mr. Maurer...Immediately after these two shots several other bullets from the Moslems, who had fired them, whizzed past me...Both men passed peacefully away. They died as good soldiers of Jesus Christ.

The missionaries found themselves pinned down in their school amidst the pogrom. According to Elizabeth S. Webb, a missionary attached to the school, "It was a terrible situation, women and girls practically alone in the building, a murderous bloodthirsty mob outside, with knife and bullet for the Armenians and the torch for their homes."

Mr. Trowbridge returned from the school to say that the only hope for safety to any Americans seemed to be to return to the school, staying there alone, separated from the Armenians. He declared that we were powerless to save the Armenians. It seems that after we left the school, Miss Wallace, Mr. Chambers, and a young Armenian preacher attempted to cross the street from Miss Wallace's to the school. Just at this time a mob rushed around the corner. The infuriated Turks recognized the preacher as an Armenian, and although Mr. Chambers threw his arms about him and did all in his power to save the man's life, they shot him dead. Not a single Armenian would they leave alive, the assassins shouted, as Mr. Chambers dragged the murdered preacher into the building.

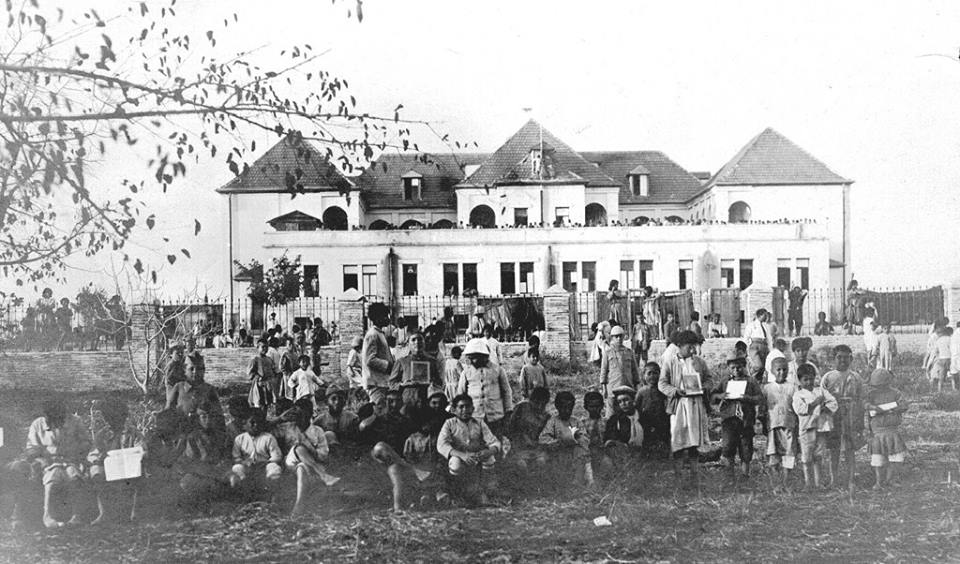
Armenian orphans of Adana Dârüleytâm.

British war correspondent Francis McCullagh wrote a year later in his book on the Ottoman Sultan Abdul Hamid II that 20,000 Armenians in Adana had been "massacred amid circumstances of such unspeakable brutality that the whole world was shocked." The British Vice-Consul, Charles Hotham Montagu Doughty-Wylie, is recorded in many sources as having worked strenuously to stop the massacres, at great personal risk. He was shot in the arm during the conflagration.

Three orphanages were built after the massacres; in Adana, Hadjin and Dörtyol. Adana Dârüleytâm accommodated around 500 orphans.

== See also ==
- List of massacres of Armenians
- List of conflicts in the Middle East
- List of massacres in Turkey

== Sources ==
- Suny, Ronald Grigor (2015). "They Can Live in the Desert but Nowhere Else": A History of the Armenian Genocide. Human rights and crimes against humanity. Princeton: Princeton University Press. ISBN 978-1-4008-6558-1.
  - Lay summary in: Ronald Grigor Suny (26 May 2015). "Armenian Genocide". 1914-1918-online. International Encyclopedia of the First World War.
