= Çatak, Saimbeyli =

Çatak
- Neighbourhood
- Location in Turkey
- Coordinates: 37°59′51″N 35°58′16″E
- Country: Turkey
- Province: Adana
- District: Saimbeyli
- Population (2022): 500
- Time zone: UTC+3 (TRT)

Çatak is a neighbourhood in the municipality and district of Saimbeyli, Adana Province, Turkey. Its population is 500 (2022).
