= Naltaş, Saimbeyli =

Naltaş
- Neighbourhood
- Location in Turkey
- Coordinates: 38°04′N 36°03′E
- Country: Turkey
- Province: Adana
- District: Saimbeyli
- Population (2022): 89
- Time zone: UTC+3 (TRT)

Naltaş is a neighbourhood in the municipality and district of Saimbeyli, Adana Province, Turkey. Its population is 89 (2022).
