= Avcıpınarı, Saimbeyli =

Avcıpınarı
- Neighbourhood
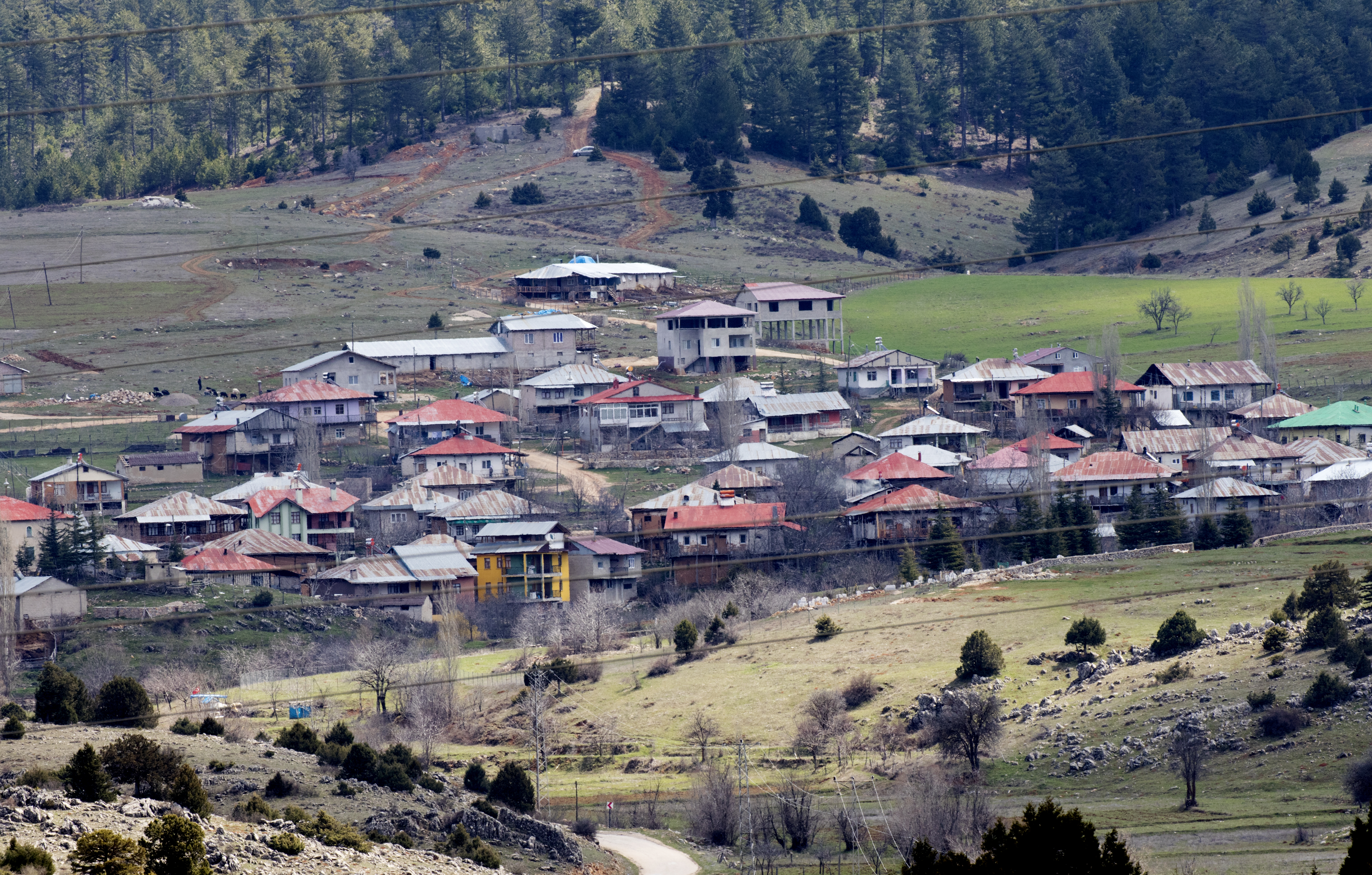

- Location within Turkey
- Coordinates: 38°04′34″N 36°10′49″E
- Country: Turkey
- Province: Adana
- District: Saimbeyli
- Population (2022): 150
- Time zone: UTC+3 (TRT)

Avcıpınarı is a neighbourhood in the municipality and district of Saimbeyli, Adana Province, Turkey. Its population is 150 (2022).
