= Yeniköy, Saimbeyli =

Yeniköy
- Neighbourhood
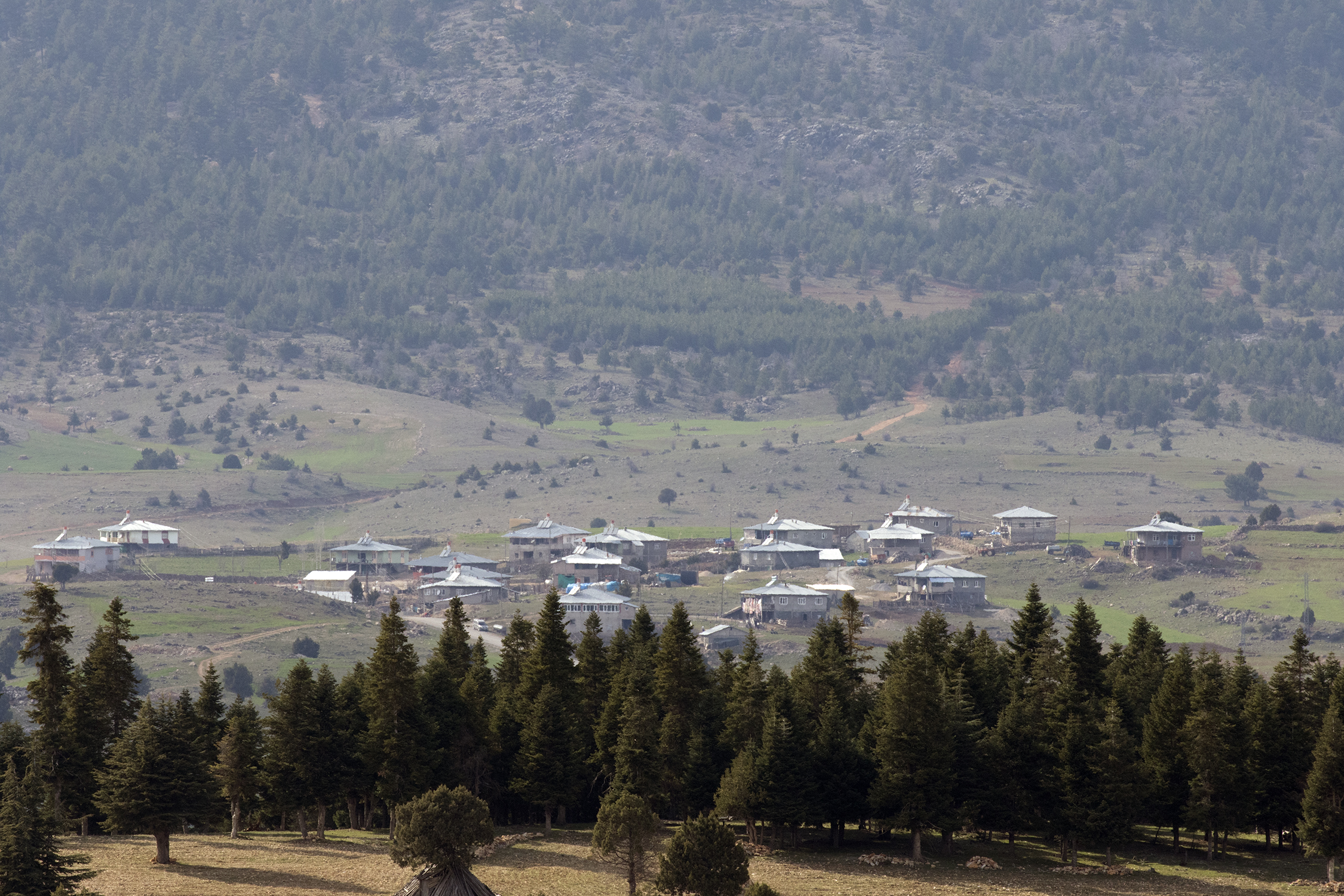

- Location within Turkey
- Coordinates: 38°01′40″N 36°12′49″E
- Country: Turkey
- Province: Adana
- District: Saimbeyli
- Population (2022): 319
- Time zone: UTC+3 (TRT)

Yeniköy is a neighbourhood in the municipality and district of Saimbeyli, Adana Province, Turkey. Its population is 319 (2022).
