= Aksaağaç, Saimbeyli =

Aksaağaç
- Neighbourhood
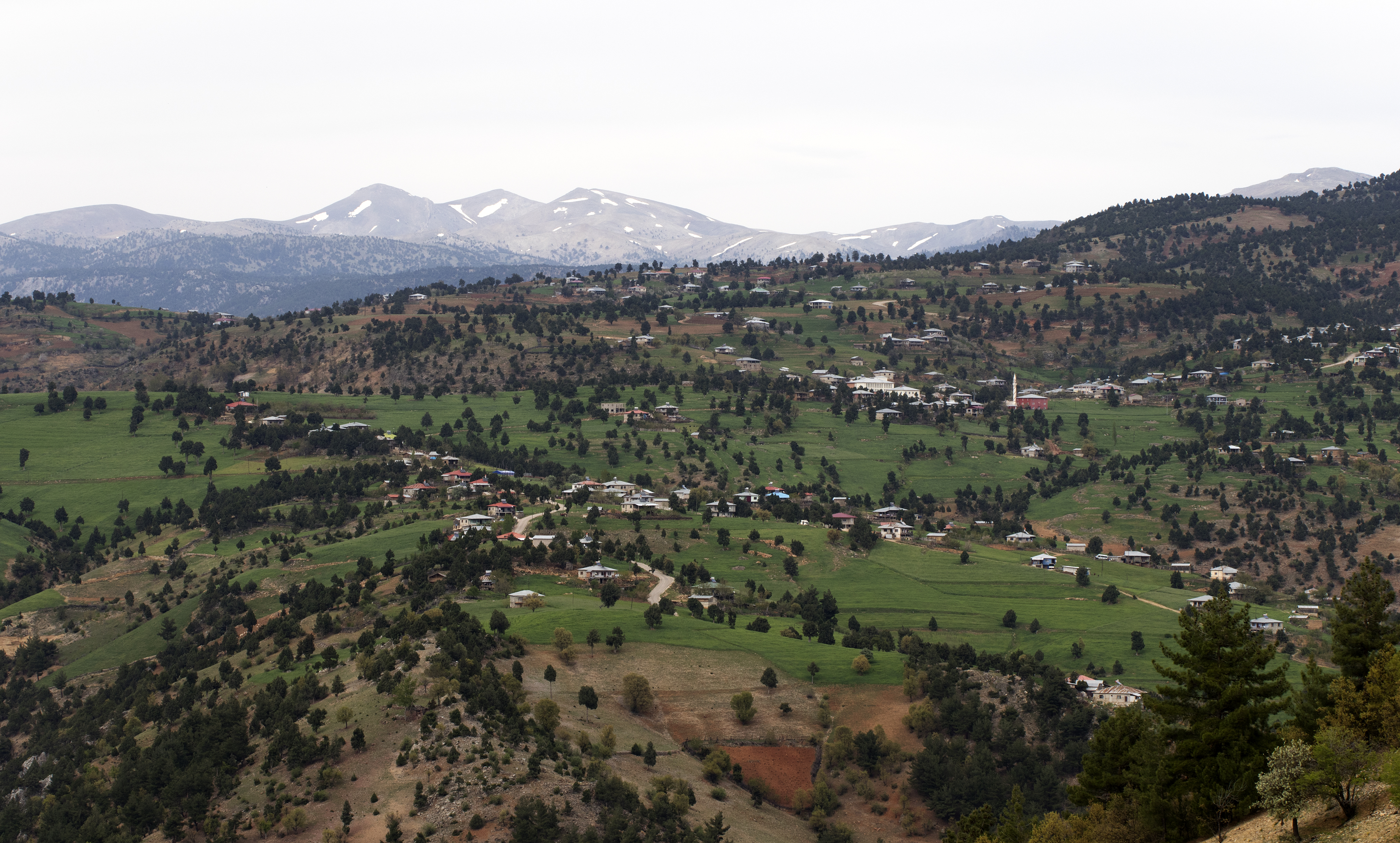

- Location within Turkey
- Coordinates: 37°54′N 36°12′E
- Country: Turkey
- Province: Adana
- District: Saimbeyli
- Population (2022): 919
- Time zone: UTC+3 (TRT)

Aksaağaç is a neighbourhood in the municipality and district of Saimbeyli, Adana Province, Turkey. Its population is 919 (2022). The village is inhabited by Turkmens of the Yağbasan and Varsak tribes.
