= Çeralan, Saimbeyli =

Çeralan
- Neighbourhood
- Location in Turkey
- Coordinates: 38°06′N 36°00′E
- Country: Turkey
- Province: Adana
- District: Saimbeyli
- Population (2022): 971
- Time zone: UTC+3 (TRT)

Çeralan is a neighbourhood in the municipality and district of Saimbeyli, Adana Province, Turkey. Its population is 971 (2022).
