= Karakuyu, Saimbeyli =

Karakuyu
- Neighbourhood
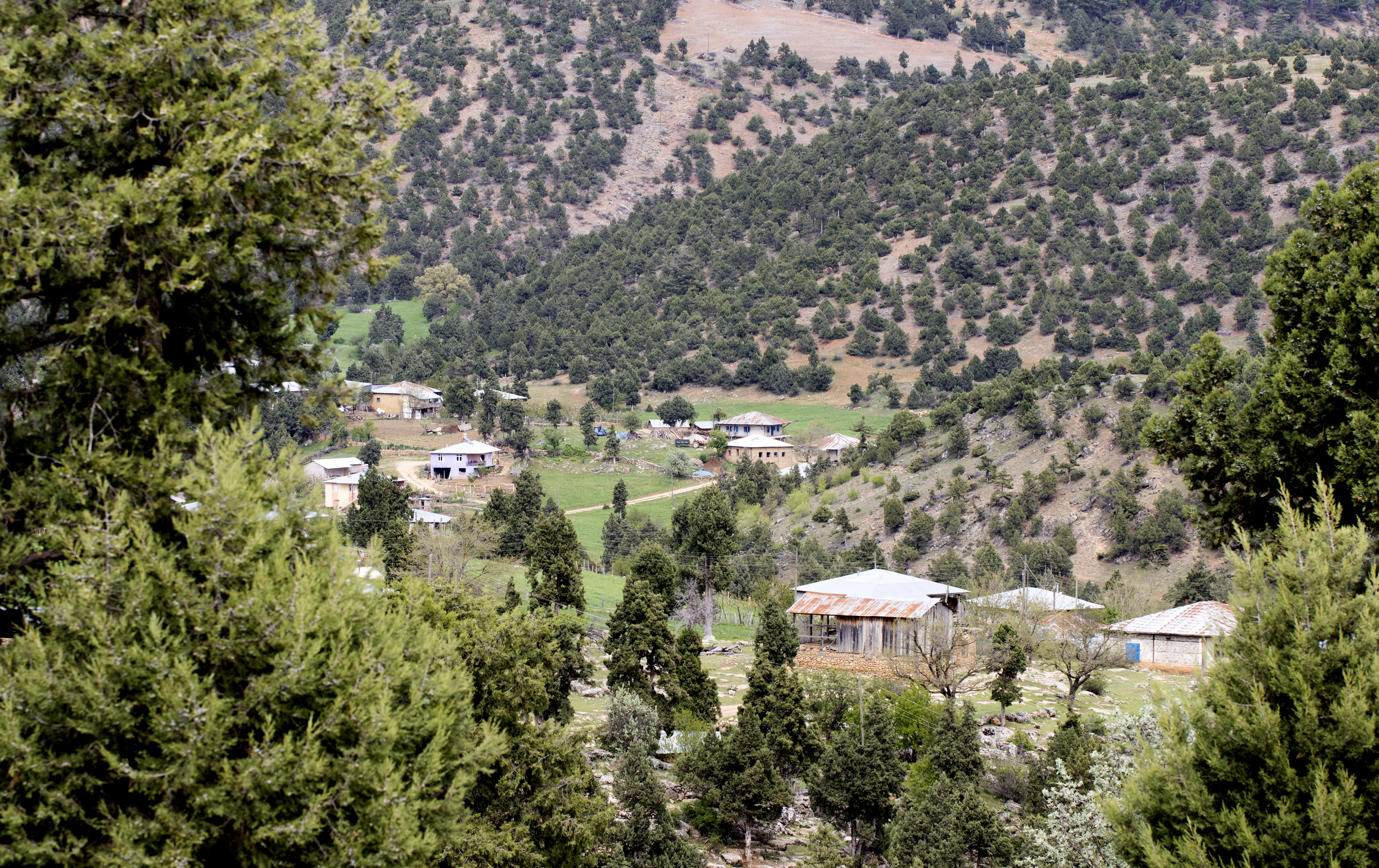

- Location within Turkey
- Coordinates: 37°51′46″N 36°12′08″E
- Country: Turkey
- Province: Adana
- District: Saimbeyli
- Population (2022): 921
- Time zone: UTC+3 (TRT)

Karakuyu is a neighbourhood in the municipality and district of Saimbeyli, Adana Province, Turkey. Its population is 921 (2022).
