= Çorak, Saimbeyli =

Çorak
- Neighbourhood
- Location in Turkey
- Coordinates: 37.9891°N 35.9259°E
- Country: Turkey
- Province: Adana
- District: Saimbeyli
- Population (2022): 195
- Time zone: UTC+3 (TRT)

Çorak is a neighbourhood in the municipality and district of Saimbeyli, Adana Province, Turkey. Its population is 195 (2022).
