= Kapaklıkuyu, Saimbeyli =

Kapaklıkuyu
- Neighbourhood
- Location in Turkey
- Coordinates: 37°49′N 36°11′E
- Country: Turkey
- Province: Adana
- District: Saimbeyli
- Population (2022): 368
- Time zone: UTC+3 (TRT)

Kapaklıkuyu is a neighbourhood in the municipality and district of Saimbeyli, Adana Province, Turkey. Its population is 368 (2022). The village is inhabited by Turkmens of the Yağbasan tribe.
