= Kızılağaç, Saimbeyli =

Kızılağaç
- Neighbourhood
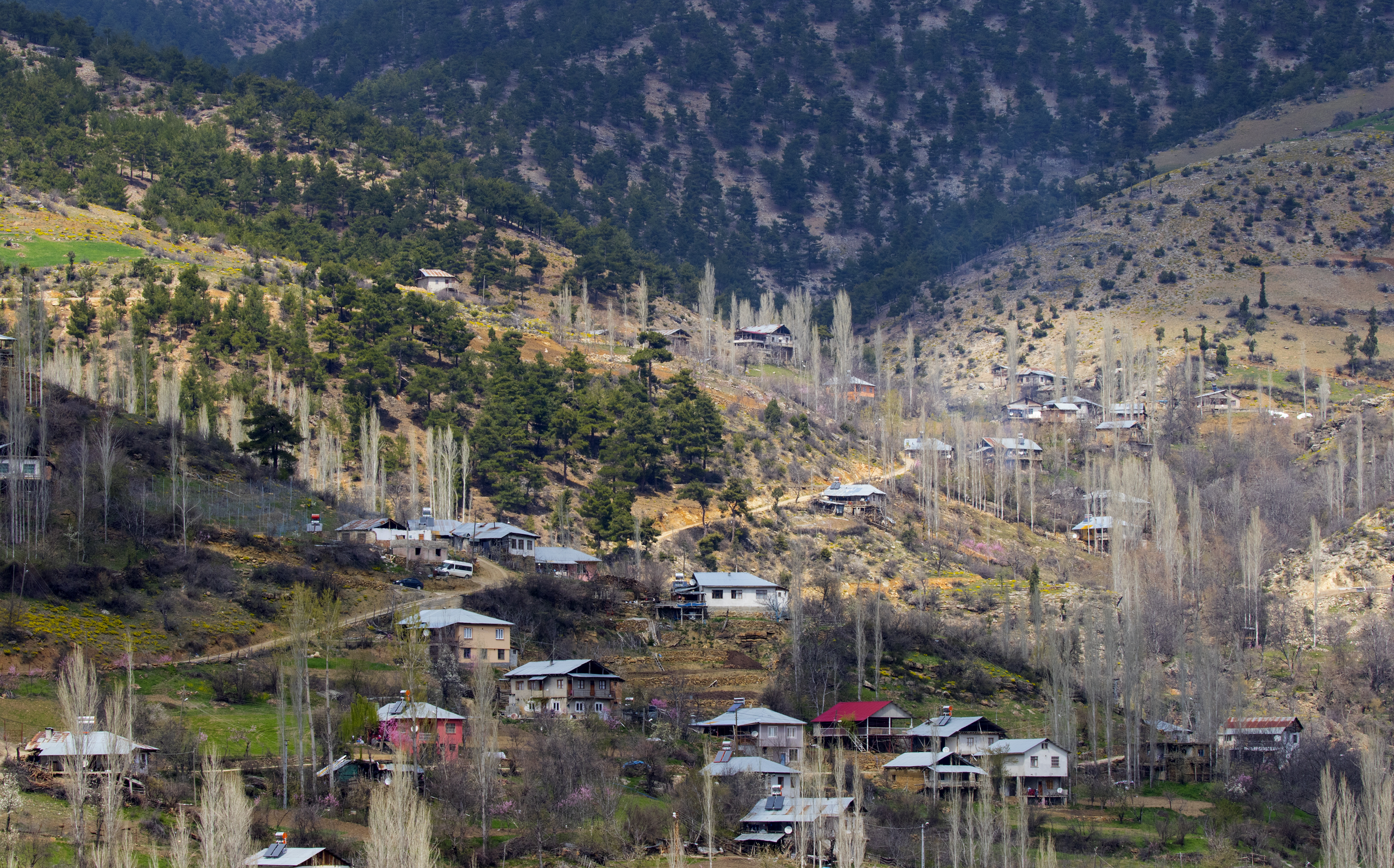

- Location within Turkey
- Coordinates: 38°00′42″N 35°57′27″E
- Country: Turkey
- Province: Adana
- District: Saimbeyli
- Population (2022): 353
- Time zone: UTC+3 (TRT)

Kızılağaç is a neighbourhood in the municipality and district of Saimbeyli, Adana Province, Turkey. Its population is 353 (2022).
