= Ayvacık, Saimbeyli =

Ayvacık
- Neighbourhood
- Location in Turkey
- Coordinates: 37°48′02″N 36°09′21″E
- Country: Turkey
- Province: Adana
- District: Saimbeyli
- Population (2022): 371
- Time zone: UTC+3 (TRT)

Ayvacık, also spelled Hayvacık, is a neighbourhood in the municipality and district of Saimbeyli, Adana Province, Turkey. Its population is 371 (2022). The village is inhabited by Turkmens of the Yağbasan and Varsak tribes.
