= Kandilli, Saimbeyli =

Kandilli
- Neighbourhood
- Location in Turkey
- Coordinates: 37°58′53″N 36°2′11″E
- Country: Turkey
- Province: Adana
- District: Saimbeyli
- Population (2022): 515
- Time zone: UTC+3 (TRT)

Kandilli is a neighbourhood in the municipality and district of Saimbeyli, Adana Province, Turkey. Its population is 515 (2022).
