= Narlıdere, Saimbeyli =

Narlıdere
- Neighbourhood
- Location in Turkey
- Coordinates: 37°54′N 35°59′E
- Country: Turkey
- Province: Adana
- District: Saimbeyli
- Population (2022): 246
- Time zone: UTC+3 (TRT)

Narlıdere (formerly: Cıvıklı) is a neighbourhood in the municipality and district of Saimbeyli, Adana Province, Turkey. Its population is 246 (2022).
