= Değirmenciuşağı, Saimbeyli =

Değirmenciuşağı
- Neighbourhood
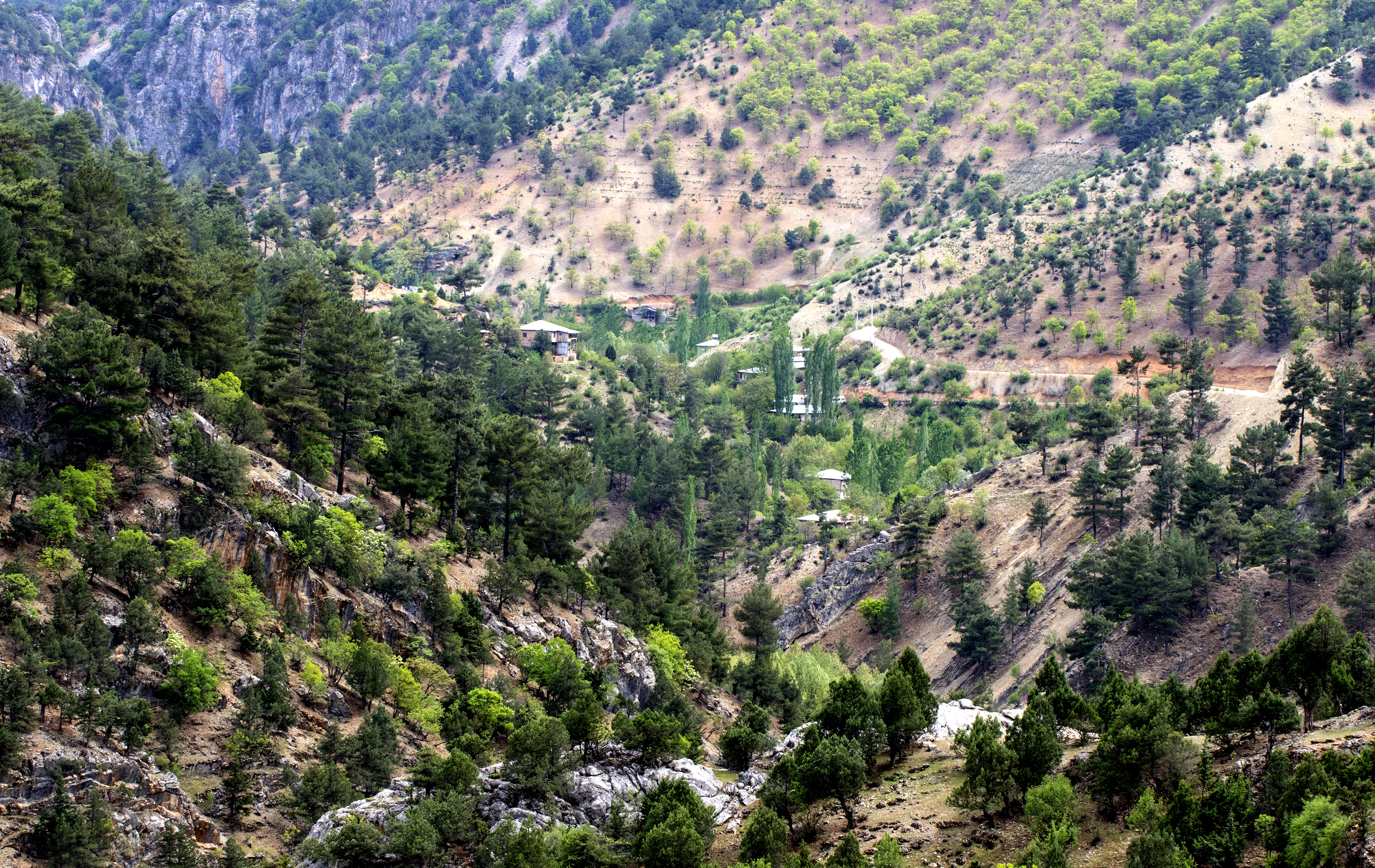

- Location within Turkey
- Coordinates: 37°51′08″N 36°09′12″E
- Country: Turkey
- Province: Adana
- District: Saimbeyli
- Population (2022): 289
- Time zone: UTC+3 (TRT)

Değirmenciuşağı is a neighbourhood in the municipality and district of Saimbeyli, Adana Province, Turkey. Its population is 289 (2022).
