= Mahmutlu, Saimbeyli =

Mahmutlu
- Neighbourhood
- Location in Turkey
- Coordinates: 37°56′32″N 36°01′54″E
- Country: Turkey
- Province: Adana
- District: Saimbeyli
- Population (2022): 319
- Time zone: UTC+3 (TRT)

Mahmutlu is a neighbourhood in the municipality and district of Saimbeyli, Adana Province, Turkey. Its population is 319 (2022).
