= Halilbeyli, Saimbeyli =

Halilbeyli
- Neighbourhood
- Location in Turkey
- Coordinates: 37°47′30″N 36°11′38″E
- Country: Turkey
- Province: Adana
- District: Saimbeyli
- Population (2022): 138
- Time zone: UTC+3 (TRT)

Halilbeyli is a neighbourhood in the municipality and district of Saimbeyli, Adana Province, Turkey. Its population is 138 (2022).
