= Gürleşen, Saimbeyli =

Gürleşen
- Neighbourhood
- Location in Turkey
- Coordinates: 37°55′N 36°05′E
- Country: Turkey
- Province: Adana
- District: Saimbeyli
- Population (2022): 294
- Time zone: UTC+3 (TRT)

Gürleşen is a neighbourhood in the municipality and district of Saimbeyli, Adana Province, Turkey. Its population is 294 (2022).
