= Himmetli, Saimbeyli =

Himmetli
- Neighbourhood
- Location in Turkey
- Coordinates: 37°52′05″N 36°04′08″E
- Country: Turkey
- Province: Adana
- District: Saimbeyli
- Population (2022): 1,003
- Time zone: UTC+3 (TRT)

Himmetli is a neighbourhood in the municipality and district of Saimbeyli, Adana Province, Turkey. Its population is 1,003 (2022).
