= Cumhurlu, Saimbeyli =

Cumhurlu
- Neighbourhood
- Location in Turkey
- Coordinates: 37°55′N 36°01′E
- Country: Turkey
- Province: Adana
- District: Saimbeyli
- Population (2022): 220
- Time zone: UTC+3 (TRT)

Cumhurlu is a neighbourhood in the municipality and district of Saimbeyli, Adana Province, Turkey. Its population is 220 (2022).
