= Conu, Azerbaijan =

Conu
- Municipality
- Location within Azerbaijan
- Coordinates: 38°36′54″N 48°30′38″E
- Country: Azerbaijan
- Rayon: Lerik

Population
  - Total: 421
- Time zone: UTC+4 (AZT)
  - Summer (DST): UTC+5 (AZT)

Coni (Talysh: Çoni) is a village and municipality in the Lerik Rayon of Azerbaijan. It has a population of 421. The municipality consists of the villages of Coni and Tülü.
