= Tülü, Saimbeyli =

Tülü
- Neighbourhood
- Location in Turkey
- Coordinates: 37°52′58″N 36°04′47″E
- Country: Turkey
- Province: Adana
- District: Saimbeyli
- Population (2022): 105
- Time zone: UTC+3 (TRT)

Tülü is a neighbourhood in the municipality and district of Saimbeyli, Adana Province, Turkey. Its population is 105 (2022).
