= Eyüplü, Saimbeyli =

Eyüplü
- Neighbourhood
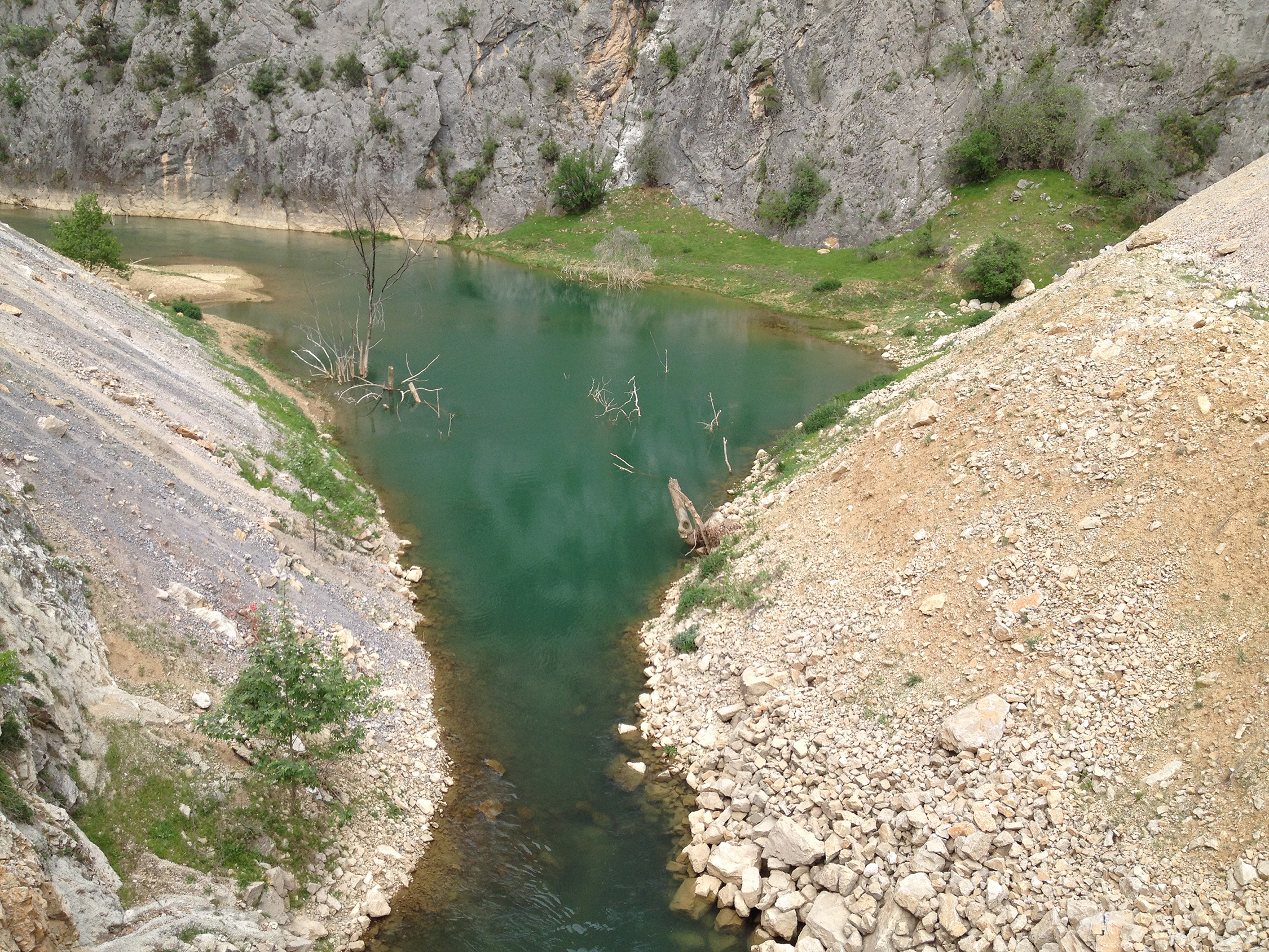

- Location within Turkey
- Coordinates: 37°55′51″N 36°08′52″E
- Country: Turkey
- Province: Adana
- District: Saimbeyli
- Population (2022): 450
- Time zone: UTC+3 (TRT)

Eyüplü is a neighbourhood in the municipality and district of Saimbeyli, Adana Province, Turkey. Its population is 450 (2022). The village is inhabited by Turkmens of the Yağbasan tribe.
