= Tülü, Lerik =

Tülü
- Location within Azerbaijan
- Coordinates: 38°36′N 48°30′E
- Country: Azerbaijan
- Rayon: Lerik
- Municipality: Coni
- Time zone: UTC+4 (AZT)
  - Summer (DST): UTC+5 (AZT)

Tülü (also, Tuli and Tyuli) is a village in the Lerik Rayon of Azerbaijan. The village forms part of the municipality of Coni.
