= Bakir =

Bakir (Arabic: بَكِير, meaning "coming early") or Bakır (Turkish, meaning "copper") may refer to:

== Given name ==
- Bakir Beširević (born 1965), Bosnian footballer
- Bakır Çağlar (1941–2011), Turkish jurist and professor of constitutional law
- Bakir Izetbegović (born 1956), Bosnian politician
- Mohamed Bakir El-Nakib (born 1974), Egyptian handball player

== Surname ==
- Aziz Osman Bakir
- Feride Bakır (born 1992), Turkish-German women's footballer
- Pelin Gündeş Bakır (born 1972), Turkish academic and politician
- Ron Bakir (born 1977), Lebanese-Australian entrepreneur
- Tursunbai Bakir Uulu (born 1958), Kyrgyz politician

== Places ==
- Bakır, Manisa, a village in the Manisa Province of Turkey

== See also ==
- Avul Pakir Jainulabdeen Abdul Kalam (1931 – 2015), 11th President of India
