= Damlataş Cave =

Cave in Alanya district of southern Turkey

- Damlataş Mağarası
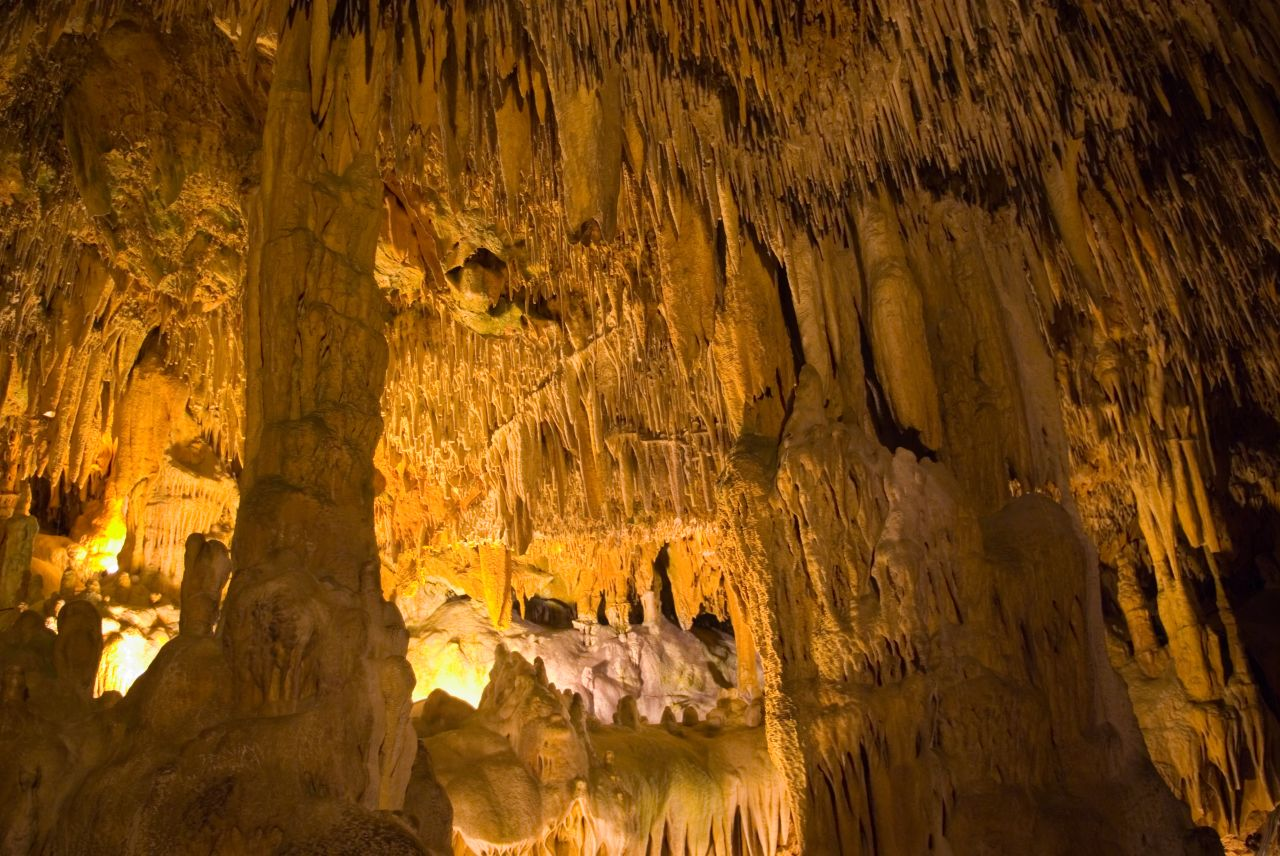
- A view of Damlataş Cave.

- Location within Turkey
- Location: Alanya, Antalya, Turkey
- Coordinates: 36°22′31″N 31°59′19″E

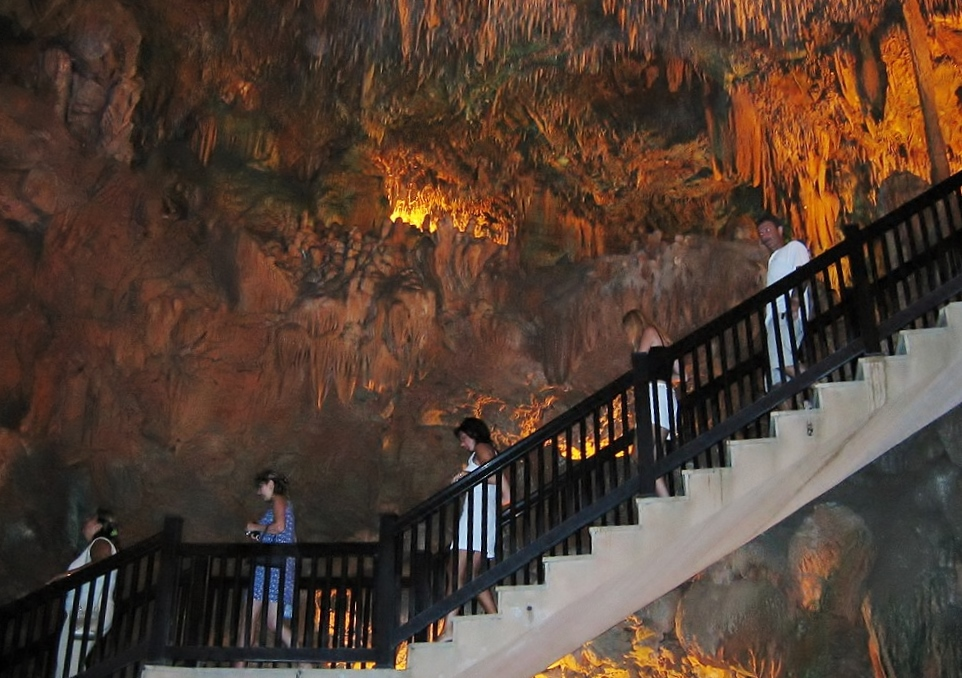
Staircase leading down to the cave.

Damlataş Cave (Turkish: Damlataş Mağarası) is a cave in Alanya district of Antalya Province, in southern Turkey.

== Location ==
The cave is located west of Alanya Castle on the coast of Mediterranean Sea in the urban fabric of Alanya. Its distance to Alanya city center is 3 km (1.9 mi), and to Antalya is 124 km (77 mi). The cave's entrance faces the beach.

== History ==
The cave was discovered accidentally during mining operations at a quarry used for the construction of Alanya Harbor in 1948. After preliminary research by two geologists, it was opened to the public.

== The cave ==
A 45–50 m (148–164 ft)-long and 15 m (49 ft)-high cylindrical cavity leads to the basement of the cave. The cave is full of stalactites and stalagmites that are formed in fifteen thousand years. The cave has an area of 180–200 m^{2} (1,900–2,200 sq ft) and a total volume about 2,500 m^{3} (88,000 cu ft) in two levels.

The air in the cave contains relatively high percentage of carbondioxide, around 10 to 12 times more than in normal air, and has 95% humidity. The air temperature is 22–23 °C (72–73 °F) regardless of the season.

== Asthma cure ==
The cave is popularly known as an "asthma-cure cave" due to the widespread belief in its capability of curing respiratory complaints, and asthma. In fact, most of the early visitors were people, who suffered from asthma. In 2010, the municipality of Alanya reported that the cave was visited within seven months by 114,000 tourists of which 2,100 suffered from asthma. In 2014, the number of visitors suffering from asthma reached 4,000.

Visitors, who come for asthma cure, stay 21 days long four hours a day in the cave. Between 6:00 and 10:00 hours local time in the early morning, the cave is open only for asthma-sick visitors. While the entrance fee for tourists cost ₺ 4.50, the visitors for cure pay only ₺ 0.30.
