= Karakocalı =

Karakocalı can refer to:

- Karakocalı, Alanya
- Karakocalı, Sungurlu
