= Beldibi =

Beldibi may refer to:

- Beldibi culture, a late Paleolithic/Mesolithic culture found at Belbaşı cave in Turkey
- Beldibi, Alanya, a village in the district of Alanya, Antalya Province, Turkey
- Beldibi, Kaş, a village in the district of Kaş, Antalya Province, Turkey
- Beldibi, Kemer, a village in the district of Kemer, Antalya Province, Turkey
- Beldibi, Muğla, a town in the district of Marmaris, Muğla Province, Turkey
