= Yaylalı =

Yaylalı can refer to:

- Yaylalı, Alanya
- Yaylalı, Kuyucak
- Yaylalı, Pazaryolu
