= Bucakköy =

Bucakköy may refer to:

- Bucakköy, Alanya, village in Antalya Province, Turkey
- Bucakköy, Kozan, village in Adana Province, Turkey
- Bucakköy, Kuyucak, village in Aydın Province, Turkey
- Bucakköy, Serik, village in Antalya Province, Turkey
