= Asmaca =

Asmaca (literally "place with vines" in Turkish) may refer to the following places in Turkey:

- Asmaca, Alanya, a village in the district of Alanya, Antalya Province
- Asmaca, Gerede, a village in the district of Gerede, Bolu Province
