= Yaylakonak =

Yaylakonak can refer to:

- Yaylakonak, Adıyaman
- Yaylakonak, Alanya
- Yaylakonak, Hınıs
