= Soğukpınar, Alanya =

Soğukpınar
- Neighbourhood
- Location in Turkey
- Coordinates: 36.6500°N 31.8833°E
- Country: Turkey
- Province: Antalya
- District: Alanya
- Population (2022): 382
- Time zone: UTC+3 (TRT)

Soğukpınar is a neighbourhood in the municipality and district of Alanya, Antalya Province, Turkey. Its population is 382 (2022).
