= Türktaş, Alanya =

Türktaş
- Neighbourhood
- Location in Turkey
- Coordinates: 36°40′N 32°00′E
- Country: Turkey
- Province: Antalya
- District: Alanya
- Population (2022): 342
- Time zone: UTC+3 (TRT)

Türktaş is a neighbourhood in the municipality and district of Alanya, Antalya Province, Turkey. Its population is 342 (2022).
