= Bıçakçı, Alanya =

Bıçakçı
- Neighbourhood
- Location in Turkey
- Coordinates: 36.5630°N 32.1709°E
- Country: Turkey
- Province: Antalya
- District: Alanya
- Population (2022): 303
- Time zone: UTC+3 (TRT)

Bıçakçı is a neighbourhood in the municipality and district of Alanya, Antalya Province, Turkey. Its population is 303 (2022).
