= Değirmendere, Alanya =

Değirmendere
- Neighbourhood
- Location in Turkey
- Coordinates: 36.6016°N 32.0597°E
- Country: Turkey
- Province: Antalya
- District: Alanya
- Population (2022): 1,370
- Time zone: UTC+3 (TRT)

Değirmendere is a neighbourhood in the municipality and district of Alanya, Antalya Province, Turkey. Its population is 1,370 (2022).
