= Güzelbağ, Alanya =

Güzelbağ
- Neighbourhood
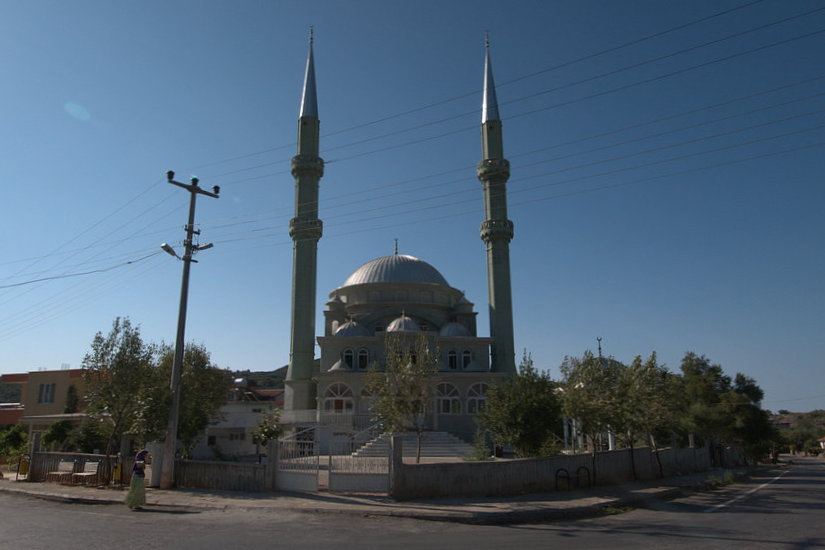
- Mosque in Güzelbağ

- Location within Turkey
- Coordinates: 36°43′51″N 31°53′48″E
- Country: Turkey
- Province: Antalya
- District: Alanya
- Population (2022): 762
- Time zone: UTC+3 (TRT)

Güzelbağ is a neighbourhood in the municipality and district of Alanya, Antalya Province, Turkey. Its population is 762 (2022). Before the 2013 reorganisation, it was a town (belde).
