= Alacami, Alanya =

Alacami
- Neighbourhood
- Location in Turkey
- Coordinates: 36.5921°N 32.2999°E
- Country: Turkey
- Province: Antalya
- District: Alanya
- Population (2022): 235
- Time zone: UTC+3 (TRT)

Alacami is a neighbourhood in the municipality and district of Alanya, Antalya Province, Turkey. Its population is 235 (2022).
