= Tırılar, Alanya =

Tırılar
- Neighbourhood
- Location in Turkey
- Coordinates: 36°29′30″N 32°16′15″E
- Country: Turkey
- Province: Antalya
- District: Alanya
- Population (2022): 230
- Time zone: UTC+3 (TRT)

Tırılar is a neighbourhood in the municipality and district of Alanya, Antalya Province, Turkey. Its population is 230 (2022).
