= Beyreli, Alanya =

Beyreli
- Neighbourhood
- Location in Turkey
- Coordinates: 36.4291°N 32.2239°E
- Country: Turkey
- Province: Antalya
- District: Alanya
- Population (2022): 539
- Time zone: UTC+3 (TRT)

Beyreli is a neighbourhood in the municipality and district of Alanya, Antalya Province, Turkey. Its population is 539 (2022).
