= Kocaoğlanlı, Alanya =

Kocaoğlanlı
- Neighbourhood
- Country: Turkey
- Province: Antalya
- District: Alanya
- Population (2022): 276
- Time zone: UTC+3 (TRT)

Kocaoğlanlı is a neighbourhood in the municipality and district of Alanya, Antalya Province, Turkey. Its population is 276 (2022).
