= Tosmur, Alanya =

Tosmur
- Neighbourhood
- Location in Turkey
- Coordinates: 36°32′N 32°03′E
- Country: Turkey
- Province: Antalya
- District: Alanya
- Population (2022): 11,712
- Time zone: UTC+3 (TRT)

Tosmur is a neighbourhood in the municipality and district of Alanya, Antalya Province, Turkey. Its population is 11,712 (2022). Before the 2013 reorganisation, it was a town (belde).
