= Emişbeleni, Alanya =

Emişbeleni
- Neighbourhood
- Location in Turkey
- Coordinates: 36°37′N 31°52′E
- Country: Turkey
- Province: Antalya
- District: Alanya
- Population (2022): 1,492
- Time zone: UTC+3 (TRT)

Emişbeleni is a neighbourhood in the municipality and district of Alanya, Antalya Province, Turkey. Its population is 1,492 (2022). Before the 2013 reorganisation, it was a town (belde).
