= Akçatı, Alanya =

Akçatı
- Neighbourhood
- Location in Turkey
- Coordinates: 36.5707°N 32.1395°E
- Country: Turkey
- Province: Antalya
- District: Alanya
- Population (2022): 407
- Time zone: UTC+3 (TRT)

Akçatı is a neighbourhood in the municipality and district of Alanya, Antalya Province, Turkey. Its population is 407 (2022).
