= Mahmutseydi, Alanya =

Mahmutseydi
- Neighbourhood
- Location in Turkey
- Coordinates: 36°38′N 32°02′E
- Country: Turkey
- Province: Antalya
- District: Alanya
- Population (2022): 850
- Time zone: UTC+3 (TRT)

Mahmutseydi is a neighbourhood in the municipality and district of Alanya, Antalya Province, Turkey. Its population is 850 (2022).
