= Dereköy, Alanya =

Dereköy
- Neighbourhood
- Location in Turkey
- Coordinates: 36.6508°N 32.0456°E
- Country: Turkey
- Province: Antalya
- District: Alanya
- Population (2022): 987
- Time zone: UTC+3 (TRT)

Dereköy (also: Dere) is a neighbourhood in the municipality and district of Alanya, Antalya Province, Turkey. Its population is 987 (2022).
