= Fakırcalı, Alanya =

Fakırcalı
- Neighbourhood
- Location in Turkey
- Coordinates: 36°28′30″N 32°16′20″E
- Country: Turkey
- Province: Antalya
- District: Alanya
- Population (2022): 290
- Time zone: UTC+3 (TRT)

Fakırcalı is a neighbourhood in the municipality and district of Alanya, Antalya Province, Turkey. Its population is 290 (2022).
