= Özvadi, Alanya =

Özvadi
- Neighbourhood
- Location in Turkey
- Coordinates: 36°23′N 32°15′E
- Country: Turkey
- Province: Antalya
- District: Alanya
- Population (2022): 327
- Time zone: UTC+3 (TRT)

Özvadi is a neighbourhood in the municipality and district of Alanya, Antalya Province, Turkey, lying 176km from Antalya. Its population is 327 (2022).
