= Saburlar, Alanya =

Saburlar
- Neighbourhood
- Country: Turkey
- Province: Antalya
- District: Alanya
- Population (2022): 319
- Time zone: UTC+3 (TRT)

Saburlar is a neighbourhood in the municipality and district of Alanya, Antalya Province, Turkey. Its population is 319 (2022).
