= Aliefendi, Alanya =

Aliefendi
- Neighbourhood
- Location in Turkey
- Coordinates: 36°27′17″N 32°11′11″E
- Country: Turkey
- Province: Antalya
- District: Alanya
- Population (2022): 983
- Time zone: UTC+3 (TRT)

Aliefendi is a neighbourhood in the municipality and district of Alanya, Antalya Province, Turkey. Its population is 983 (2022).
