= Hacıkerimler, Alanya =

Hacıkerimler
- Neighbourhood
- Location in Turkey
- Coordinates: 36°39′N 31°57′E
- Country: Turkey
- Province: Antalya
- District: Alanya
- Population (2022): 368
- Time zone: UTC+3 (TRT)

Hacıkerimler is a neighbourhood in the municipality and district of Alanya, Antalya Province, Turkey. The neighborhood is located on the southern slopes of the Taurus Mountains, nestled among green maquis and pine trees. Its population is 368 (2022).
