= Uzunöz, Alanya =

Uzunöz
- Neighbourhood
- Location in Turkey
- Coordinates: 36.5382°N 32.2043°E
- Country: Turkey
- Province: Antalya
- District: Alanya
- Population (2022): 492
- Time zone: UTC+3 (TRT)

Uzunöz is a neighbourhood in the municipality and district of Alanya, Antalya Province, Turkey. Its population is 492 (2022).
