= İmamlı, Alanya =

İmamlı
- Neighbourhood
- Location in Turkey
- Coordinates: 36.3509°N 32.2631°E
- Country: Turkey
- Province: Antalya
- District: Alanya
- Population (2022): 635
- Time zone: UTC+3 (TRT)

İmamlı is a neighbourhood in the municipality and district of Alanya, Antalya Province, Turkey. Its population is 635 (2022).
