= Payallar, Alanya =

Payallar
- Neighbourhood
- Location in Turkey
- Coordinates: 36°36′N 31°51′E
- Country: Turkey
- Province: Antalya
- District: Alanya
- Population (2022): 9,691
- Time zone: UTC+3 (TRT)

Payallar is a neighbourhood in the municipality and district of Alanya, Antalya Province, Turkey. Its population is 9,691 (2022). This place is located on the southern coast of Turkey. Before the 2013 reorganisation, it was a town (belde).
