= Demirtaş, Alanya =

Demirtaş
- Neighbourhood
- Location in Turkey
- Coordinates: 36.4261°N 32.1925°E
- Country: Turkey
- Province: Antalya
- District: Alanya
- Population (2022): 3,449
- Time zone: UTC+3 (TRT)

Demirtaş is a neighbourhood in the municipality and district of Alanya, Antalya Province, Turkey. Its population is 3,449 (2022). Before the 2013 reorganisation, it was a town (belde).
