= Cikcilli, Alanya =

Cikcilli
- Neighbourhood
- Location in Turkey
- Coordinates: 36°33′N 32°02′E
- Country: Turkey
- Province: Antalya
- District: Alanya
- Population (2022): 21,449
- Time zone: UTC+3 (TRT)

Cikcilli is a neighbourhood in the municipality and district of Alanya, Antalya Province, Turkey. Its population is 21,449 (2022). Before the 2013 reorganisation, it was a town (belde).

It is located on the eastern-northeastern side of Alanya city.
