= Elikesik, Alanya =

Elikesik
- Neighbourhood
- Location in Turkey
- Coordinates: 36°35′N 31°56′E
- Country: Turkey
- Province: Antalya
- District: Alanya
- Population (2022): 2,118
- Time zone: UTC+3 (TRT)

Elikesik is a neighbourhood in the municipality and district of Alanya, Antalya Province, Turkey. Its population is 2,118 (2022).
