= Yalçı, Alanya =

Yalçı
- Neighbourhood
- Location in Turkey
- Coordinates: 36°33′N 32°17′E
- Country: Turkey
- Province: Antalya
- District: Alanya
- Population (2022): 93
- Time zone: UTC+3 (TRT)

Yalçı is a neighbourhood in the municipality and district of Alanya, Antalya Province, Turkey. Its population is 93 (2022).
