= Gözüküçüklü, Alanya =

Gözüküçüklü
- Neighbourhood
- Location in Turkey
- Coordinates: 36°30′N 32°10′E
- Country: Turkey
- Province: Antalya
- District: Alanya
- Population (2022): 470
- Time zone: UTC+3 (TRT)

Gözüküçüklü is a neighbourhood in the municipality and district of Alanya, Antalya Province, Turkey. Its population is 470 (2022).
