= Keşefli, Alanya =

Keşefli
- Neighbourhood
- Location in Turkey
- Coordinates: 36°24′N 32°11′E
- Country: Turkey
- Province: Antalya
- District: Alanya
- Population (2022): 682
- Time zone: UTC+3 (TRT)

Keşefli (also: Kesaflı) is a neighbourhood in the municipality and district of Alanya, Antalya Province, Turkey. Its population is 682 (2022).
