= Kargıcak, Alanya =

Kargıcak
- Neighbourhood
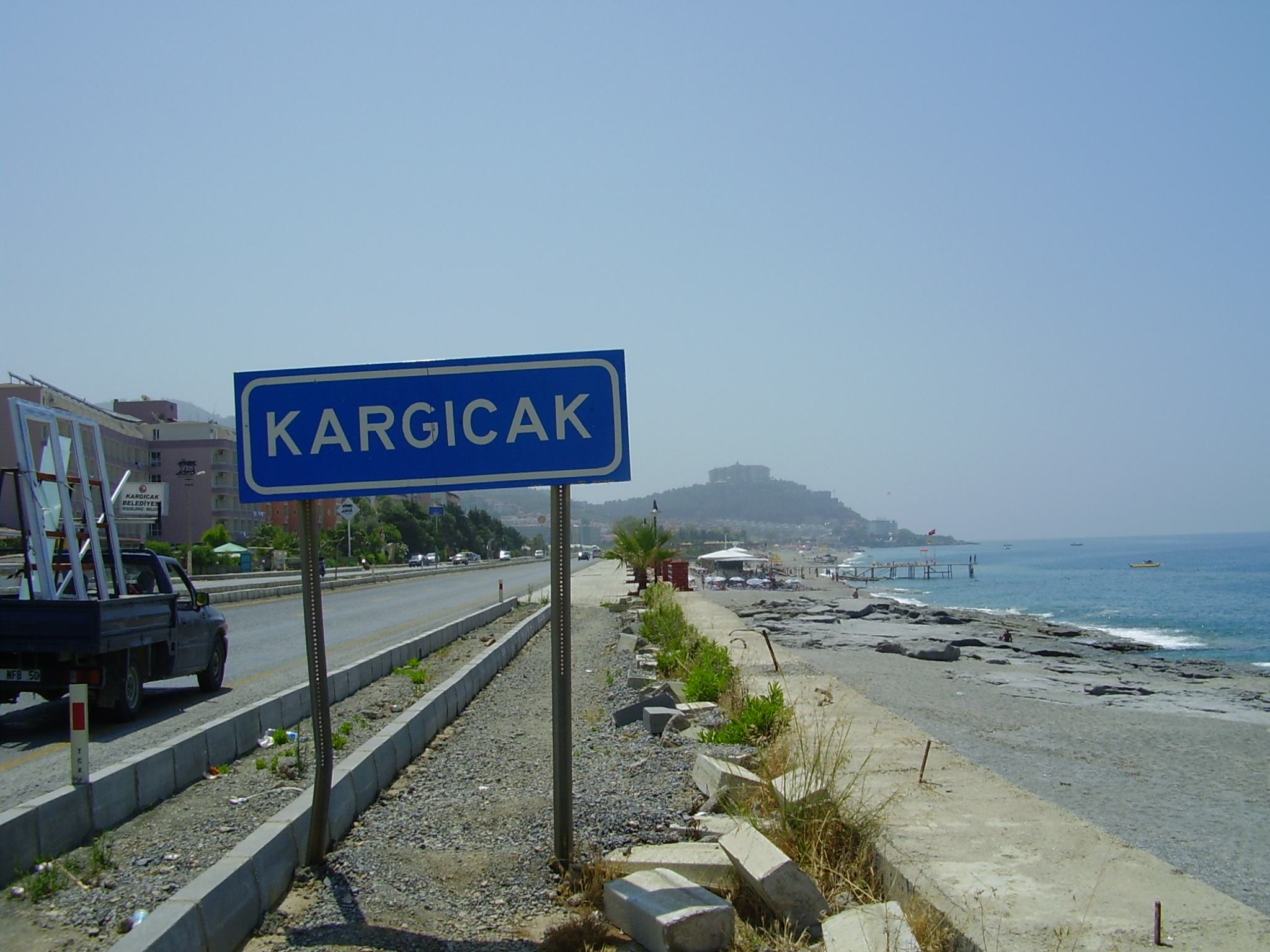
- Kargıcak shore

- Location within Turkey
- Coordinates: 36.4664°N 32.1265°E
- Country: Turkey
- Province: Antalya
- District: Alanya
- Population (2022): 5,989
- Time zone: UTC+3 (TRT)

Kargıcak is a neighbourhood in the municipality and district of Alanya, Antalya Province, Turkey. Its population is 5,989 (2022). Before the 2013 reorganisation, it was a town (belde).
