= Kızılcaşehir, Alanya =

Kızılcaşehir
- Neighbourhood
- Location in Turkey
- Coordinates: 36°34′N 32°05′E
- Country: Turkey
- Province: Antalya
- District: Alanya
- Population (2022): 1,100
- Time zone: UTC+3 (TRT)

Kızılcaşehir is a neighbourhood in the municipality and district of Alanya, Antalya Province, Turkey. Its population is 1,100 (2022).
