= Paşaköy, Alanya =

Paşaköy
- Neighbourhood
- Location in Turkey
- Coordinates: 36.6252°N 32.0019°E
- Country: Turkey
- Province: Antalya
- District: Alanya
- Population (2022): 207
- Time zone: UTC+3 (TRT)

Paşaköy is a neighbourhood in the municipality and district of Alanya, Antalya Province, Turkey. Its population is 207 (2022).
