= Orhanköy, Alanya =

Orhanköy
- Neighbourhood
- Location in Turkey
- Coordinates: 36°42′N 31°51′E
- Country: Turkey
- Province: Antalya
- District: Alanya
- Population (2022): 188
- Time zone: UTC+3 (TRT)

Orhanköy (also: Orhan) is a neighbourhood in the municipality and district of Alanya, Antalya Province, Turkey. Its population is 188 (2022). In 2001 it passed from the Gündoğmuş District to the Alanya District.
