= Obaalacami, Alanya =

Obaalacami
- Neighbourhood
- Location in Turkey
- Coordinates: 36°36′N 32°07′E
- Country: Turkey
- Province: Antalya
- District: Alanya
- Population (2022): 393
- Time zone: UTC+3 (TRT)

Obaalacami is a neighbourhood in the municipality and district of Alanya, Antalya Province, Turkey. Its population is 393 (2022).
