= Sapadere, Alanya =

Sapadere
- Neighbourhood
- Location in Turkey
- Coordinates: 36°30′N 32°18′E
- Country: Turkey
- Province: Antalya
- District: Alanya
- Population (2022): 722
- Time zone: UTC+3 (TRT)

Sapadere is a neighbourhood in the municipality and district of Alanya, Antalya Province, Turkey.Sapadere Canyon was opened to tourism in 2008 with the construction of the wooden walkway, which was designed to provide access while minimizing environmental impact on this delicate ecosystem. Its population is 722 (2022).
