= Karapınar, Alanya =

Karapınar
- Neighbourhood
- Location in Turkey
- Coordinates: 36.6091°N 32.4016°E
- Country: Turkey
- Province: Antalya
- District: Alanya
- Population (2022): 121
- Time zone: UTC+3 (TRT)

Karapınar is a neighbourhood in the municipality and district of Alanya, Antalya Province, Turkey. Its population is 121 (2022).
