= List of mayors of Alanya =

This is a list of mayors of Alanya, Turkey. Since becoming a "Belediye" (municipality) in 1872, Alanya has had eighteen mayors. Briefly following the 1960 Turkish coup d'état the city had an appointed mayor.

1. Ahmet Asim Bey (1901 - 1904)
2. Hacı Hafız Kadri (1904 - 1905)
3. Ahmet Talat (1905 - 1927)
4. Hüsnü Şifa (1927 - 1930)
5. Hüseyin Hacikadiroğlu (1930 - 1936)
6. Hüseyin Okan (1936 - 1942)
7. Şükrü Ulusoy (1942 - 1950)
8. Mithat Görgün (1950 - 1959)
9. Yahya Barcin (1959 - 1960)
10. İzzet Azakoğlu (1963 - 1973)
11. Eşref Kahvecioğlu (1973 - 1980)
12. Şevket Tokuş (1980 - 1982)
13. Sıtkı Ulu (1982 - 1984)
14. Müstakbel Dim (1984 - 1989)
15. Cengiz Aydoğan (1989 - 1999)
16. Mustafa Bekar (1999 - 1999)
17. Hasan Sipahioğlu (1999 - 2014)
18. Adem Murat Yücel (2014 – 2024)
19. Osman Tarık Özçelik (2024 – present)
