= Toslak, Alanya =

Toslak
- Neighbourhood
- Location in Turkey
- Coordinates: 36°38′N 31°54′E
- Country: Turkey
- Province: Antalya
- District: Alanya
- Population (2022): 3,630
- Time zone: UTC+3 (TRT)

Toslak is a neighbourhood in the municipality and district of Alanya, Antalya Province, Turkey. Its population is 3,630 (2022).
