= Başköy, Alanya =

Başköy
- Neighbourhood
- Location in Turkey
- Coordinates: 36.4576°N 32.3580°E
- Country: Turkey
- Province: Antalya
- District: Alanya
- Population (2022): 172
- Time zone: UTC+3 (TRT)

Başköy is a neighbourhood in the municipality and district of Alanya, Antalya Province, Turkey. Its population is 172 (2022).
