= Alara Castle =

Medieval castle in Alanya, southern Turkey

- Alara Kalesi
- Between Manavgat and Alanya, Antalya Province, Turkey
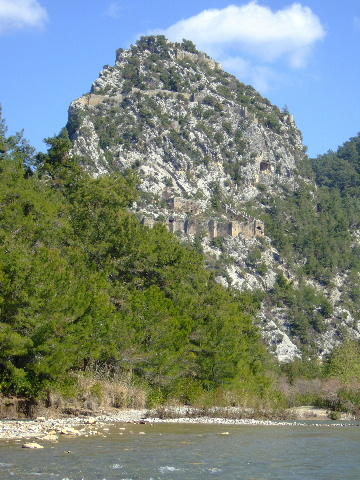
- Alara Castle at the top of a massive rocky hill on the east bank of the Alara River in Alanya, Turkey

Site information
- Type: Castle
- Controlled by: Armenian Kingdom of Cilicia; Byzantine Empire; Seljuk Sultanate of Rum

Location
- Location of Alara Castle in Turkey
- Coordinates: 36.69836°N 31.72957°E

The Alara Castle (Turkish: Alara Kalesi), is a historic fortification located at Alanya district of Antalya Province in southern Turkey.

The castle was built under the Byzantine Empire, and in the 11th century became the western outpost of the Armenian Kingdom of Cilicia (1080-1375). It had the function to safeguard the caravans from holdup robberies that were stopping over at the last caravanserai Alarahan on the Silk Road to the sea, situated 300–400 m (980–1,310 ft) in the south. The castle incorporates a citadel inside the outer walls. The castle's inside is reached by some 180-step stairway, which is tunneled in the rock. Around the middle of the stairway, a deepening opens to a cistern. In the citadel, a palace, accommodation facilities for the garrison, a mosque and a bath are among the ruins.

It is located 35 km (22 mi) southeast of Manavgat, 37 km (23 mi) northwest of Alanya and 7 km (4.3 mi) away from the Mediterranean Sea. Situated atop a steep massive rock at the east bank of Alara River, the castle was hard to win. The lord of the castle gave it however up in 1231 as he realized that Seljuk Sultan of Rum Alaeddin Keykubad I (reigned 1220–1237) had conquered Alanya.

The regional government of Antalya considered in 2011 the restoration of Alara Castle and its subsequent opening to the public as a place of interest.
