= Süleymanlar, Alanya =

Süleymanlar
- Neighbourhood
- Location in Turkey
- Coordinates: 36.6692°N 32.0223°E
- Country: Turkey
- Province: Antalya
- District: Alanya
- Population (2022): 465
- Time zone: UTC+3 (TRT)

Süleymanlar is a neighbourhood in the municipality and district of Alanya, Antalya Province, Turkey. Its population is 465 (2022).
