= List of governors of Alanya =

This is a list of District governors of Alanya, Turkey. Those marked (*) later became province governors, or Vali.

Number	District Governor	Start	End
2	Nazmi Bey	15.05.1923	27.09.1924
3	Vehbi Bey	23.09.1924	25.06.1927
4	Adil Bey	25.06.1927	16.01.1929
5	Halit Raci Bey	16.01.1929	04.04.1929
6	Rüştem Fehmi Bey	05.05.1929	06.07.1929
7	Mustafa Selim İmece	14.12.1929	29.03.1932
8	Sabri Demir	05.09.1932	13.10.1933
9	Kamil İnkaya	14.11.1933	19.07.1934
10	Hami Arıkan	18.08.1934	10.10.1936
11	Fazıl Özsoy	31.10.1936	31.08.1937
12	Osman Nuri Yılmaz	16.10.1937	05.11.1937
13	Abdülhalim Doğru	10.11.1937	21.07.1939
14	Niyazi Akı *	24.08.1939	04.12.1940
15	Ali Denktaş	08.01.1941	05.04.1941
16	Arif Oya	07.05.1943	20.01.1944
17	Sait Yüce	21.01.1944	07.07.1944
18	Saffet Gürtav	02.02.1945	01.11.1946
19	Selahattin Gökbil	08.11.1946	21.02.1947
20	Fevzi Öncel	23.07.1947	04.10.1948
21	Celal Balkanlı	18.08.1948	02.08.1950
22	Salih Topkan	22.08.1950	01.09.1951
23	Hüsamettin Karakimseli	23.09.1951	11.11.1952
24	Ekrem Rolles	01.12.1952	22.04.1953
25	M. Emin Yüzbaşıoğlu	22.07.1953	05.11.1954
26	Tevfik Perkkaya	24.11.1954	06.04.1955
27	Osman Gümrükçüoğlu	11.10.1955	11.08.1957
28	Kadir Demirel	23.09.1957	04.01.1958
29	Ethem Recep Boysan	17.03.1958	07.08.1959
30	Abdullah Cevdet Başaral	30.09.1959	20.07.1960
31	İsmet Hilmi Balcı	24.10.1960	24.09.1962
32	Cevdet Şükrü Beşe	26.09.1962	26.07.1963
33	Nihat Oğuz Bor *	28.08.1963	20.01.1966
34	M. Sabri Yorulmaz	29.11.1966	12.08.1969
35	Raif Erbilol	14.08.1969	05.10.1970
36	Fahri Yücel *	02.10.1970	20.10.1972
37	Mustafa Bayata	27.10.1972	25.12.1975
38	Nizamettin Güven	29.12.1975	10.09.1979
39	Remzi Ataman	17.09.1979	01.12.1981
40	Naim Dalkılıç	11.12.1981	08.10.1986
41	Aydın Güçlü *	27.10.1986	23.04.1990
42	Ergun Gökçay	26.06.1990	20.09.1990
43	Lütfi Yiğenoğlu *	20.09.1990	15.09.1995
44	Osman Dıraçoğlu *	27.09.1995	15.09.1997
45	Cengiz Gökçe	18.09.1997	06.05.2002
46	Günhan Sarikaya	06.05.2002	26.10.2006
47	Hulusi Doğan	26.10.2006	
