= Türkler, Alanya =

Türkler
- Neighbourhood
- Location within Turkey
- Coordinates: 36.6013°N 31.8151°E
- Country: Turkey
- Province: Antalya
- District: Alanya
- Population (2022): 4,798
- Time zone: UTC+3 (TRT)

Türkler is a neighbourhood in the municipality and district of Alanya, Antalya Province, Turkey. The village was named "Kürtler" (meaning "Kurds") until 27 July 1943, when its name was changed to "Türkler" (meaning "Turks") as part of a broader policy of Turkification of place names. Its population is 4,798 (2022). Before the 2013 reorganisation, it was a town (belde).
