= Alanya Castle =

Castle in Alanya, Turkey

Coordinates: 36.53321°N 31.99076°E

- Alanya Kalesi
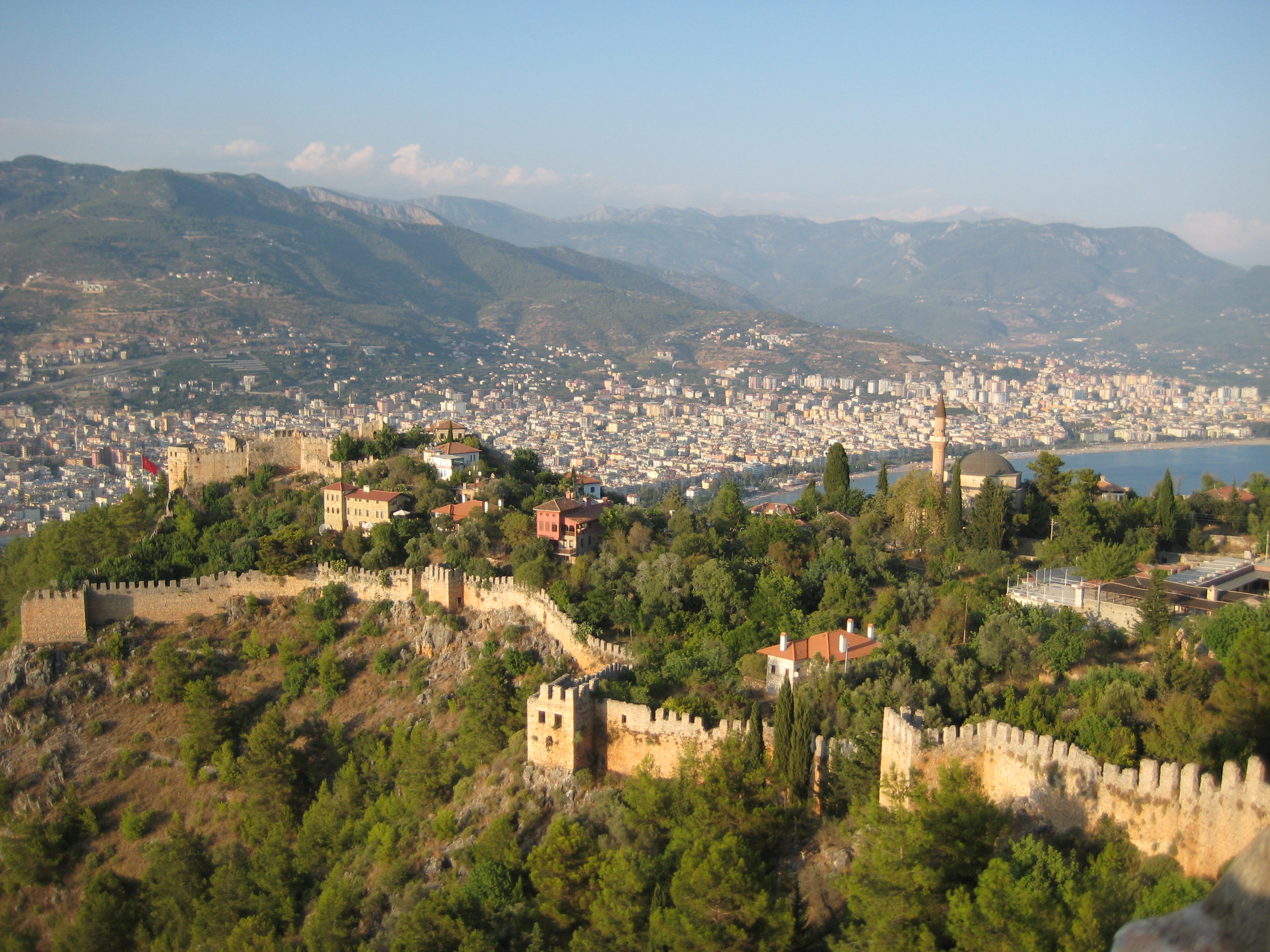
- Walls and landward fortress of Alanya Kale
- Interactive map of the Alanya Castle area
- Former names: Alaiye Castle

General information
- Type: Castle
- Architectural style: Seljuk
- Location: Alanya, Turkey
- Completed: 1226

Alanya Castle (Alanya Kalesi) is a medieval castle in the southern Turkish city of Alanya.

== History ==
Most of the castle was built in the 13th century under the Seljuq Sultanate of Rûm following the city's conquest in 1220 by Alaeddin Keykubad I, as part of a building campaign that included the Kızıl Kule.

Map of Alanya.

The castle was built on the remnants of earlier Byzantine era and Roman era fortifications. After the area was pacified under the Ottoman Empire, the castle ceased to be purely defensive, and numerous villas were built inside the walls during the 19th century. Today the building is an open-air museum.

The castle is located 250 metres (820 ft) high on a rocky peninsula jutting into the Mediterranean Sea, which protects it from three sides and the entire castle complex covers approximately 10 hectares. The wall which surrounds the castle is 6.5 kilometres (4.0 mi) long and includes 140 towers. 400 different cisterns were built to serve the castle. In 2009, city officials filed to include Alanya Castle and Tersane as UNESCO World Heritage Sites, and they were named to the 2009 Tentative List.
