= Büyükpınar, Alanya =

Büyükpınar
- Neighbourhood
- Location in Turkey
- Coordinates: 36.4172°N 32.1994°E
- Country: Turkey
- Province: Antalya
- District: Alanya
- Population (2022): 232
- Time zone: UTC+3 (TRT)

Büyükpınar is a neighbourhood in the municipality and district of Alanya, Antalya Province, Turkey. Its population is 232 (2022).
