= İspatlı, Alanya =

İsbatlı
- Neighbourhood
- Location in Turkey
- Coordinates: 36°26′N 32°10′E
- Country: Turkey
- Province: Antalya
- District: Alanya
- Population (2022): 391
- Time zone: UTC+3 (TRT)

İsbatlı (also: İspatlı) is a neighbourhood in the municipality and district of Alanya, Antalya Province, Turkey. Its population is 391 (2022).
