= Kestel, Alanya =

Kestel
- Neighbourhood
- Location in Turkey
- Coordinates: 36.5161°N 32.0743°E
- Country: Turkey
- Province: Antalya
- District: Alanya
- Population (2022): 15,445
- Time zone: UTC+3 (TRT)

Kestel is a neighbourhood in the municipality and district of Alanya, Antalya Province, Turkey. Its population is 15,445 (2022). Before the 2013 reorganisation, it was a town (belde).
