= Hocalar, Alanya =

Hocalar
- Neighbourhood
- Location in Turkey
- Coordinates: 36°23′28″N 32°13′45″E
- Country: Turkey
- Province: Antalya
- District: Alanya
- Population (2022): 480
- Time zone: UTC+3 (TRT)

Hocalar is a neighbourhood in the municipality and district of Alanya, Antalya Province, Turkey. Its population is 480 (2022).
