= Kayabaşı, Alanya =

Kayabaşı
- Neighbourhood
- Location in Turkey
- Coordinates: 36.6521°N 31.9323°E
- Country: Turkey
- Province: Antalya
- District: Alanya
- Population (2022): 626
- Time zone: UTC+3 (TRT)

Kayabaşı is a neighbourhood in the municipality and district of Alanya, Antalya Province, Turkey. Its population is 626 (2022).
