= Taşbaşı, Alanya =

Taşbaşı
- Neighbourhood
- Location in Turkey
- Coordinates: 36.5886°N 32.2597°E
- Country: Turkey
- Province: Antalya
- District: Alanya
- Population (2022): 106
- Time zone: UTC+3 (TRT)

Taşbaşı is a neighbourhood in the municipality and district of Alanya, Antalya Province, Turkey. Its population is 106 (2022).
