= Gümüşkavak, Alanya =

Gümüşkavak
- Neighbourhood
- Location in Turkey
- Coordinates: 36°32′51″N 32°14′25″E
- Country: Turkey
- Province: Antalya
- District: Alanya
- Population (2022): 599
- Time zone: UTC+3 (TRT)

Gümüşkavak is a neighbourhood in the municipality and district of Alanya, Antalya Province, Turkey. Its population is 599 (2022).
