= Öteköy, Alanya =

Öteköy
- Neighbourhood
- Location in Turkey
- Coordinates: 36.5864°N 32.2336°E
- Country: Turkey
- Province: Antalya
- District: Alanya
- Population (2022): 140
- Time zone: UTC+3 (TRT)

Öteköy is a neighbourhood in the municipality and district of Alanya, Antalya Province, Turkey. Its population is 140 (2022).
