= Seki, Alanya =

Seki
- Neighbourhood
- Location in Turkey
- Coordinates: 36.4396°N 32.1544°E
- Country: Turkey
- Province: Antalya
- District: Alanya
- Population (2022): 594
- Time zone: UTC+3 (TRT)

Seki is a neighbourhood in the municipality and district of Alanya, Antalya Province, Turkey. Its population is 594 (2022).
