= Uğrak, Alanya =

Uğrak
- Neighbourhood
- Location in Turkey
- Coordinates: 36.3598°N 32.2272°E
- Country: Turkey
- Province: Antalya
- District: Alanya
- Population (2022): 478
- Time zone: UTC+3 (TRT)

Uğrak is a neighbourhood in the municipality and district of Alanya, Antalya Province, Turkey. Its population is 478 (2022).
