= Üzümlü, Alanya =

Üzümlü
- Neighbourhood
- Country: Turkey
- Province: Antalya
- District: Alanya
- Population (2022): 243
- Time zone: UTC+3 (TRT)

Üzümlü is a neighbourhood in the municipality and district of Alanya, Antalya Province, Turkey. Its population is 243 (2022).
