= Alanya =

- District and municipality
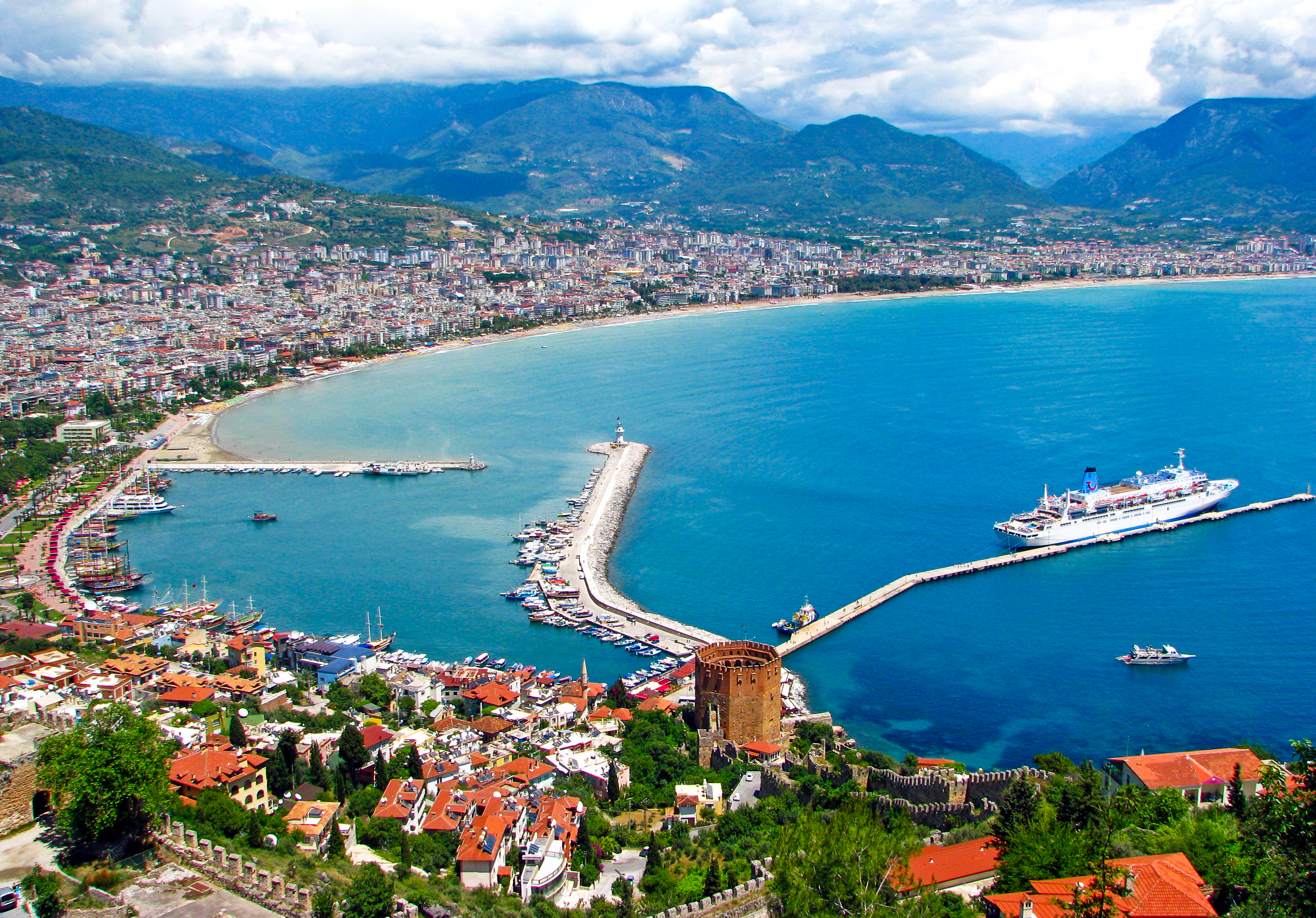
- Castle and harbour of Alanya

- Coat of arms Logo

- Map showing Alanya District in Antalya Province

- Location within Turkey
- Coordinates: 36°33′N 32°00′E
- Country: Turkey
- Province: Antalya

Government
  - Mayor: Osman Tarık Özçelik (CHP)
- Area: 1,577 km^{2} (609 sq mi)
- Population (2022): 364,180
  - Density: 230.9/km^{2} (598.1/sq mi)
- Time zone: UTC+3 (TRT)
- Postal code: 07400
- Area code: 0242
- Website: www.alanya.bel.tr

Alanya (/əˈlɑːnjə/ ə-LAHN-yə; Turkish pronunciation: [aˈɫanja]), formerly Alaiye, is a beach resort city, a municipality and district of Antalya Province, Turkey. It is on the southern coast of Turkey, in the country's Mediterranean Region, 133 kilometres (83 mi) east of the city of Antalya. Its area is 1,577 km^{2}, and its population is 364,180 (2022). The city proper has 189,222 inhabitants (2022).

Because of its natural strategic position on a small peninsula into the Mediterranean Sea below the Taurus Mountains, Alanya has been a local stronghold for many Mediterranean-based empires, including the Ptolemaic, Seleucid, Roman, Byzantine, and Ottoman Empires. Alanya's greatest political importance came in the Middle Ages, with the Seljuk Sultanate of Rûm under the rule of Alaeddin Kayqubad I, from whom the city derives its name. His building campaign resulted in many of the city's landmarks, such as the Kızıl Kule (Red Tower), Tersane (Shipyard), and Alanya Castle.

The Mediterranean climate, natural attractions, and historic heritage make Alanya a popular destination for tourism, and responsible for nine percent of Turkey's tourism sector and thirty percent of foreign purchases of real estate in Turkey. Tourism has risen since 1958 to become the dominant industry in the city, resulting in a corresponding increase in city population. Warm-weather sporting events and cultural festivals take place annually in Alanya. In 2014 Mayor Adem Murat Yücel, of the Nationalist Movement Party unseated Hasan Sipahioğlu, of the Justice and Development Party, who had previously led the city since 1999. Adem Murat Yücel has served two terms as the Mayor of Alanya, first elected in 2014 and then elected for a second time in 2019. In March 31st 2024 Turkish local elections Osman Tarık Özçelik of the Republican People's Party has been elected as the new Mayor of Alanya, making an historic mark as the Republican People's Party was able to win an election in the city after 74 years.

== Names ==
The city has changed hands many times over the centuries, and its name has reflected this. Alanya was known in Latin as Coracesium or in Greek as Korakesion (Ancient Greek: Κορακήσιον) from the Luwian Korakassa meaning "point/protruding city". The Roman Catholic Church still recognizes the Latin name as a titular see in its hierarchy. Under the Byzantine Empire it became known as Kalonoros or Kalon Oros, meaning "beautiful/fine mountain" in Greek. The Seljuks renamed the city Alaiye (علائیه), a derivative of the Sultan Alaeddin Kayqubad I's name. In the 13th and 14th centuries, Italian traders called the city Candelore or Cardelloro. In his 1935 visit, Mustafa Kemal Atatürk finalized the name in the new alphabet as Alanya, changing the 'i' and 'e' in Alaiye, reportedly because of a misspelled telegram in 1933.

== History ==
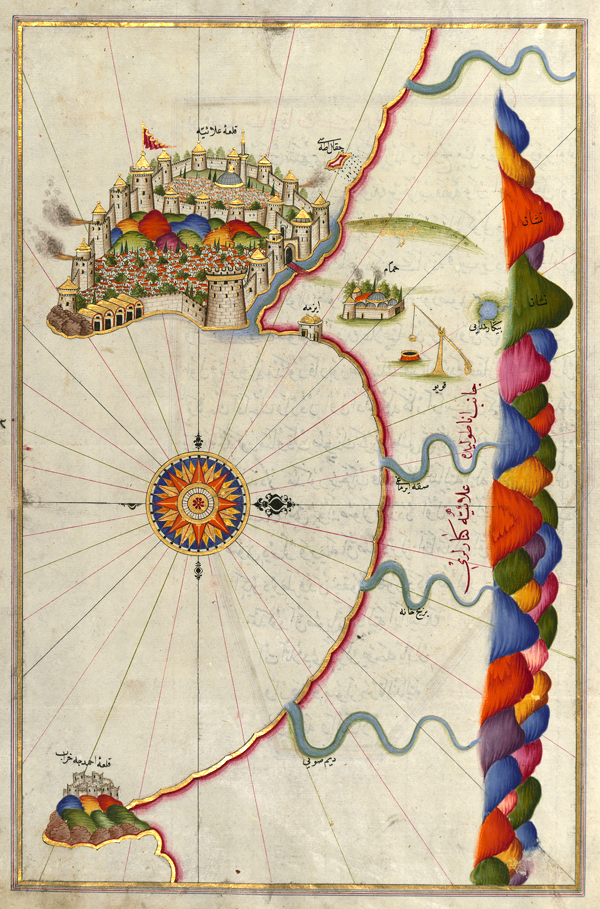
Piri Reis map of Alanya from 1525 showing the extent of the medieval city and the location on the Pamphylia plain.

Finds in the nearby Karain Cave indicate occupation during the Paleolithic era as far back as 20,000 BC, and archeological evidence shows a port existed at Syedra, south of the modern city, during the Bronze Age around 3,000 BC. A Phoenician language tablet found in the district dates to 625 BC, and the city is specifically mentioned in the 4th-century BC Greek geography manuscript, the periplus of Pseudo-Scylax. The castle rock was likely inhabited under the Hittites and the Achaemenid Empire, and was first fortified in the Hellenistic period following the area's conquest by Alexander the Great. Alexander's successors left the area to one of the competing Macedonian generals, Ptolemy I Soter, after Alexander's death in 323 BC. His dynasty maintained loose control over the mainly Isaurian population, and the port became a popular refuge for Mediterranean pirates. The city resisted Antiochus III the Great of the neighboring Seleucid kingdom in 199 BC, but was loyal to the pirate Diodotus Tryphon when he seized the Seleucid crown from 142 to 138 BC. His rival Antiochus VII Sidetes completed work in 137 BC on a new castle and port, begun under Diodotus.

The Roman Republic fought Cilician pirates in 102 BC, when Marcus Antonius the Orator established a proconsulship in nearby Side, and in 78 BC under Servilius Vatia, who moved to control the Isaurian tribes. The period of piracy in Alanya finally ended after the city's incorporation into the Pamphylia province by Pompey in 67 BC, with the Battle of Korakesion fought in the city's harbor. In Strabo's reckoning, Coracesium marked the boundary between ancient Pamphylia and Cilicia (Cilicia Trachaea, in particular); though other ancient authors placed the boundary elsewhere. Isaurian banditry remained an issue under the Romans, and the tribes revolted in the fourth and fifth centuries AD, with the largest rebellion being from 404 to 408.

With the spread of Christianity Coracesium, as it was called, became a bishopric. Its bishop Theodulus took part in the First Council of Constantinople in 381, Matidianus in the Council of Ephesus in 431, Obrimus in the Council of Chalcedon in 451, and Nicephorus (Nicetas) in the Third Council of Constantinople in 680. Coracesium was a suffragan of the metropolitan see of Side, the capital of the Roman province of Pamphylia Prima, to which Coracesium belonged. It continued to be mentioned in the Notitiae Episcopatuum as late as the 12th or 13th century. No longer a residential bishopric, Coracesium is today listed by the Catholic Church as a titular see.

Islam arrived in the 7th century with Arab raids, which led to the construction of new fortifications. The area fell from Byzantine control after the Battle of Manzikert in 1071 to tribes of Seljuk Turks, only to be returned in 1120 by John II Komnenos.

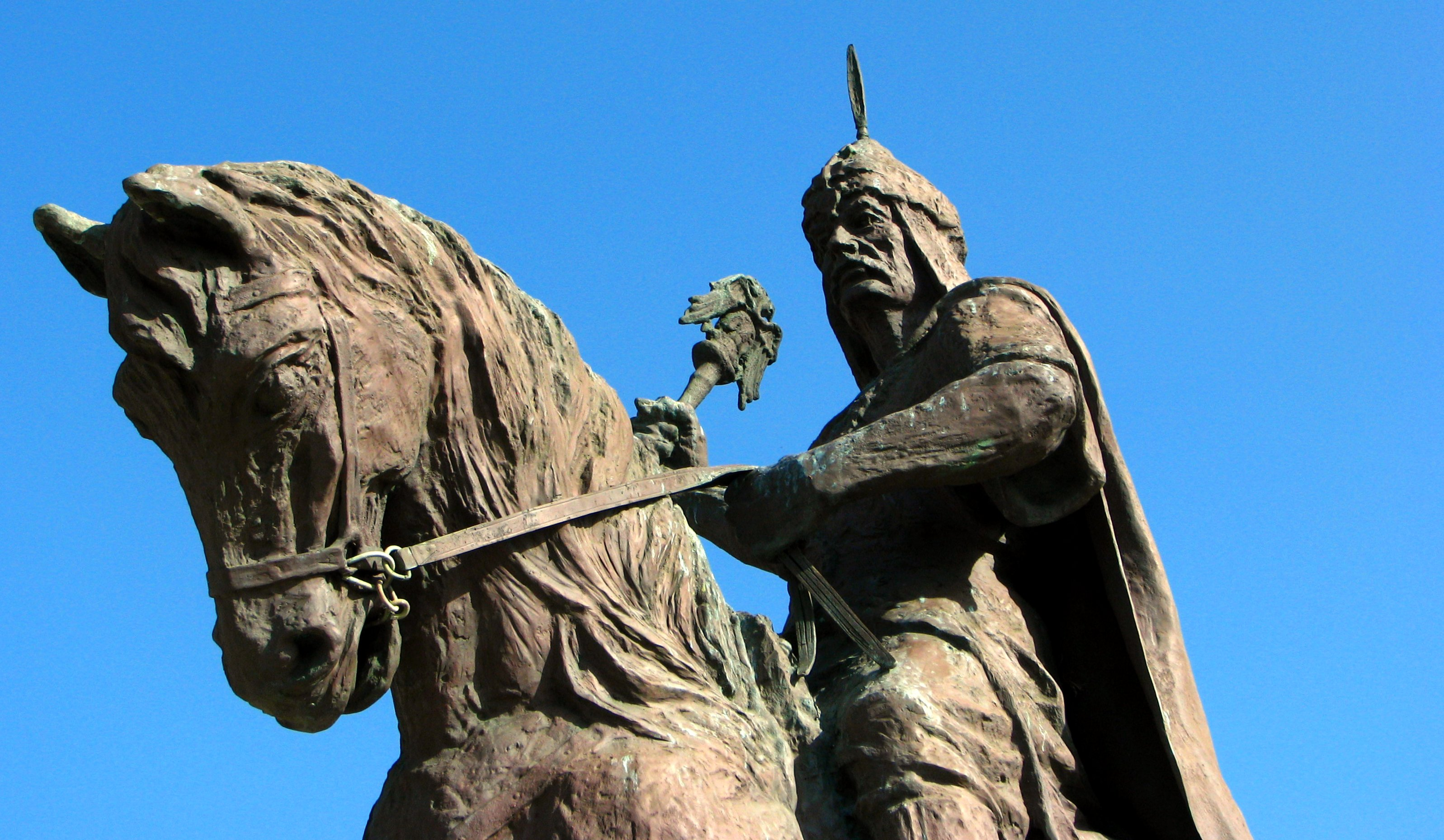
Statue of Kayqubad I in Alanya

Following the Fourth Crusade's attack on the Byzantines, the Christian Armenian Kingdom of Cilicia periodically held the port, and it was from an Armenian, Kir Fard, that the Turks took lasting control in 1221 when the Anatolian Seljuk Sultan Alaeddin Kayqubad I captured it, assigning the former ruler, whose daughter he married, to the governance of the city of Akşehir. Seljuk rule saw the golden age of the city, and it can be considered the winter capital of their empire. Building projects, including the twin citadel, city walls, arsenal, and Kızıl Kule, made it an important seaport for western Mediterranean trade, particularly with Mamluk Egypt and the Italian city-states. Alaeddin Kayqubad I also constructed numerous gardens and pavilions outside the walls, and many of his works can still be found in the city. These were likely financed by his own treasury and by the local emirs, and constructed by the contractor Abu 'Ali al-Kattani al-Halabi. Alaeddin Kayqubad I's son, Sultan Gıyaseddin Keyhüsrev II, continued the building campaign with a new cistern in 1240.

At the Battle of Köse Dağ in 1243, the Mongol hordes broke the Seljuk hegemony in Anatolia. Alanya was then subject to a series of invasions from Anatolian beyliks. Lusignans from Cyprus briefly overturned the then ruling Hamidid dynasty in 1371. The Karamanids sold the city in 1427 for 5,000 gold coins to the Mamluks of Egypt for a period before General Gedik Ahmed Pasha in 1471 incorporated it into the growing Ottoman Empire. The city was made a capital of a local sanjak in the eyalet of Içel. The Ottomans extended their rule in 1477 when they brought the main shipping trade, lumber, then mostly done by Venetians, under the government monopoly. On September 6, 1608, the city rebuffed a naval attack by the Order of Saint Stephen from the Duchy of Florence.

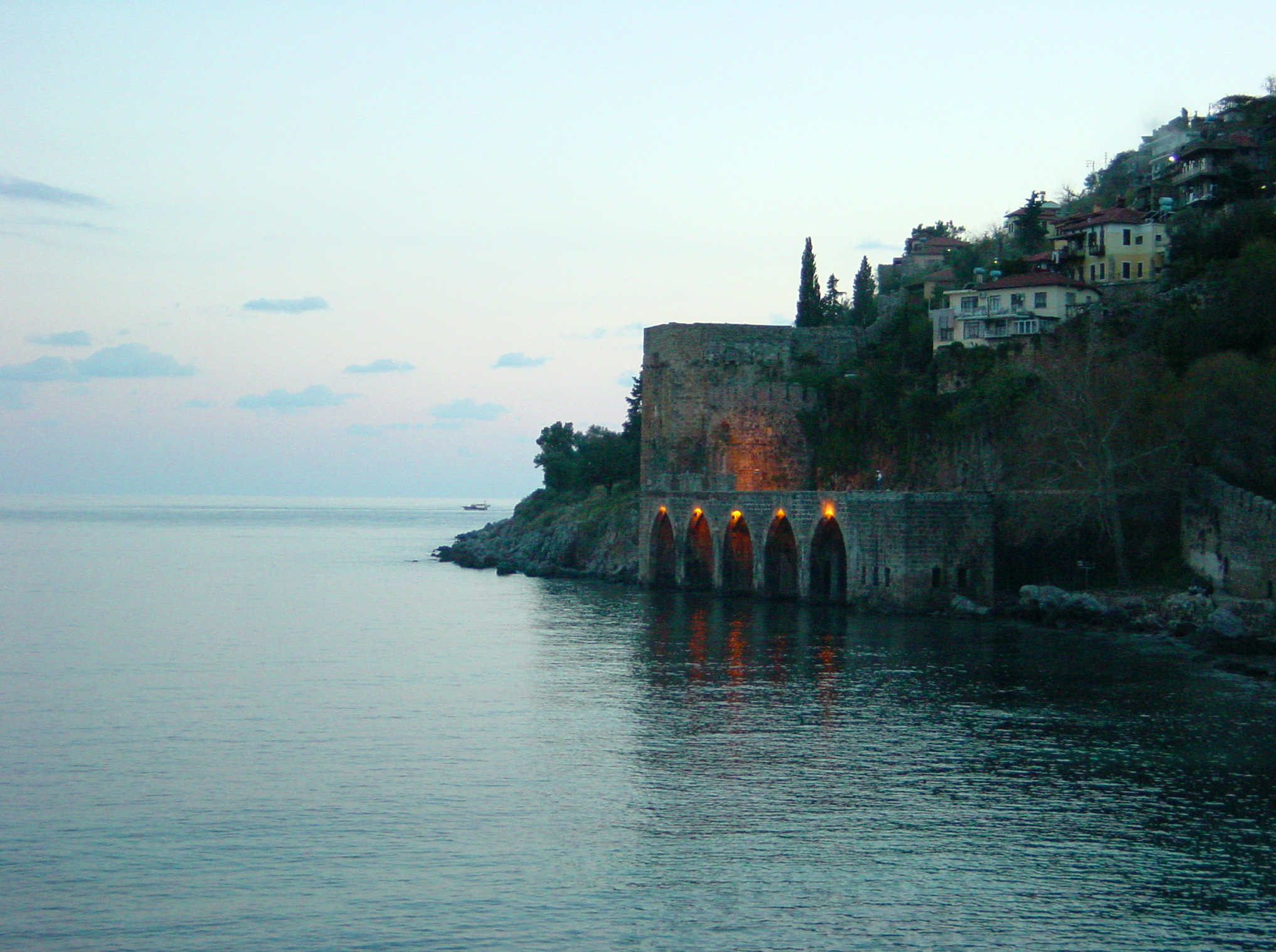
The Seljuk era Tersane was a drydock for ships.

Trade in the region was reduced by the development of an oceanic route from Europe around Africa to India, and in the tax registers of the late sixteenth century, Alanya failed to qualify as an urban centre. In 1571 the Ottomans designated the city as part of the newly conquered province of Cyprus. The conquest further diminished the economic importance of Alanya's port. Traveler Evliya Çelebi visited the city in 1671/1672, and wrote on the preservation of Alanya Castle, but also on the dilapidation of Alanya's suburbs. The city was reassigned in 1864 under Konya, and in 1868 under Antalya, as it is today. During the 18th and 19th centuries numerous villas were built in the city by Ottoman nobility, and civil construction continued under the local dynastic Karamanid authorities. Bandits again became common across Antalya Province in the mid-nineteenth century.

After World War I, Alanya was nominally partitioned in the 1917 Agreement of St.-Jean-de-Maurienne to Italy, before returning to the Turkish Republic in 1923 under the Treaty of Lausanne. Like others in this region, the city suffered heavily following the war and the population exchanges that heralded the Turkish Republic, when many of the city's Christians resettled in Nea Ionia, outside Athens. The Ottoman census of 1893 listed the number of Greeks in the city at 964 out of a total population of 37,914. Tourism in the region started among Turks who came to Alanya in the 1960s for the alleged healing properties of Damlataş Cave, and later the access provided by Antalya Airport in 1998 allowed the town to grow into an international resort. Strong population growth through the 1990s was a result of immigration to the city, and has driven a rapid modernization of the infrastructure.

== Geography ==
Map of the Alanya Peninsula

Located on the Gulf of Antalya on the Anatolian coastal plain of Pamphylia, the town is situated between the Taurus Mountains to the north and the Mediterranean Sea, and is part of the Turkish Riviera, occupying roughly 70 kilometres (43 mi) of coastline. From west to east, the Alanya district is bordered by the Manavgat district along the coast, the mountainous Gündoğmuş inland, Hadim and Taşkent in the Province of Konya, Sarıveliler in the Province of Karaman, and the coastal Gazipaşa district. Manavgat is home to the ancient cities of Side and Selge. East of the city, the Dim River flows from the mountains in Konya on a south-west route into the Mediterranean.

The Pamphylia plain between the sea and the mountains is an isolated example of an Eastern Mediterranean conifer-sclerophyllous-broadleaf forest, which include Lebanon cedar, evergreen scrub, fig trees, and black pine. The Alanya Massif refers to the area of metamorphic rocks east of Antalya. This formation is divided into three nappes from lowest to highest, the Mahmutlar, the Sugözü, and the Yumrudağ. The similar lithology extends beneath the city in a tectonic window. Bauxite, an aluminum ore, is common to the area north of city, and can be mined.

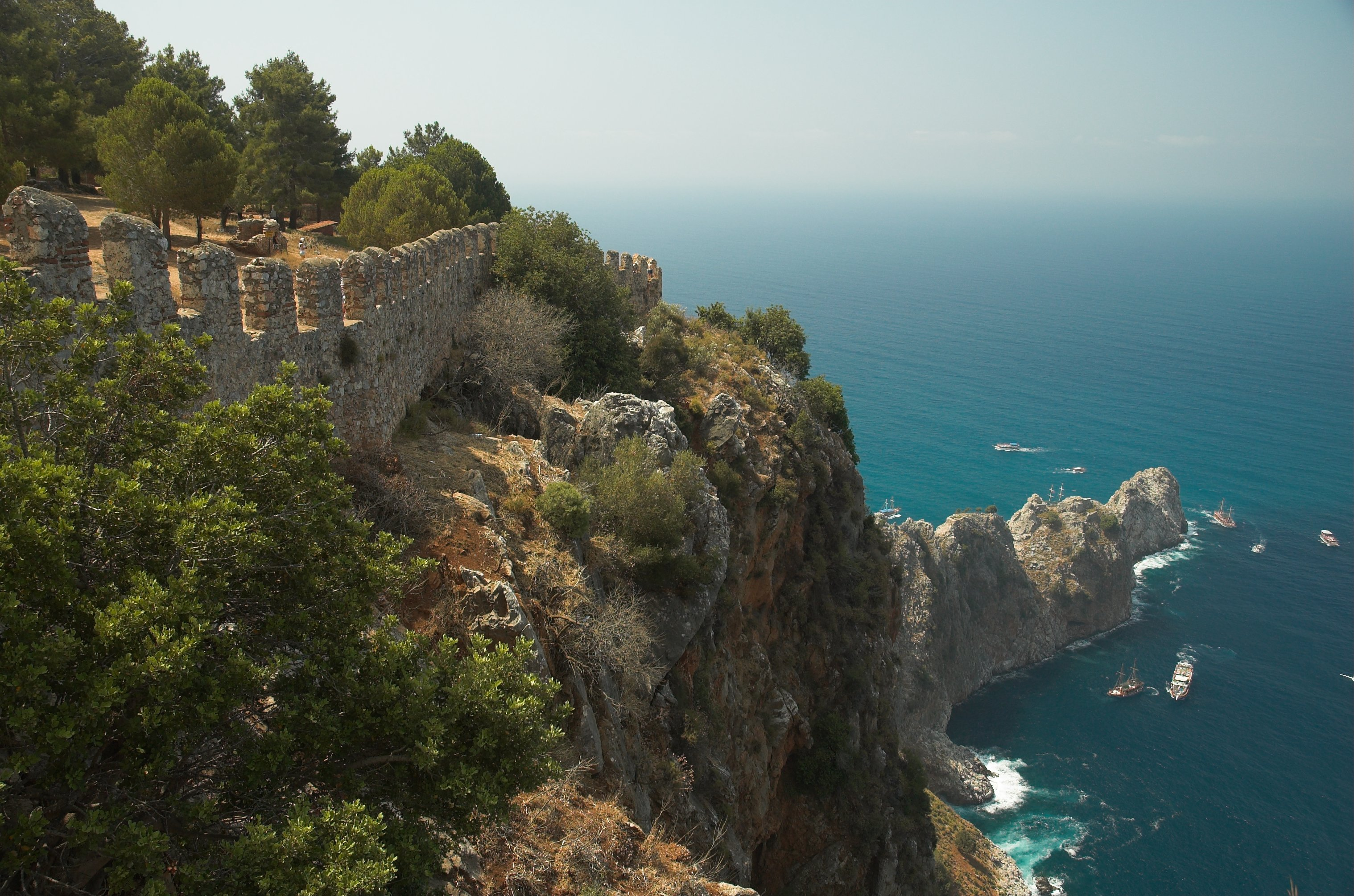
Tip of the Alanya Peninsula

The town is divided east–west by a rocky peninsula, which is the distinctive feature of the city. The harbor, city center, and Keykubat Beach, named after the Sultan Kayqubad I, are on the east side of the peninsula. Damlataş Beach, named for the famous "dripping caves", and Kleopatra Beach are to the west. The name "Cleopatra" possibly derives from either the Ptolemaic princess' visit here or the area's inclusion in her dowry to Mark Antony. Atatürk Bulvarı, the main boulevard, runs parallel to the sea, and divides the southern, much more touristic side of Alanya from the northern, more indigenous side that extends north into the mountains. Çevre Yolu Caddesi, another major road, encircles the main town to the north.

=== Climate ===
Alanya has a typical hot-summer Mediterranean climate (Köppen: Csa), or a dry-summer humid subtropical climate (Trewartha: 'wet' Cs/Cf). Located at the Mediterranean Basin, the subtropical high pressure zone ensures that most rain comes during the winter, leaving the summers long, hot, and dry, prompting the Alanya board of Tourism to use the slogan "where the sun smiles".

Winters, however, are mild and wet. Storm cells sometimes bring with them fair weather waterspouts when close to the shore. The presence of the Taurus Mountain near to the sea causes fog, in turn creating visible rainbows many mornings. The height of the mountains creates an interesting effect as snow can often be seen on them even on warm days in the city below. The sea at Alanya has an average temperature of 21.4 °C (71 °F) annually.

Climate data for Alanya (1991-2020, extremes 1970-present)
Month	Jan	Feb	Mar	Apr	May	Jun	Jul	Aug	Sep	Oct	Nov	Dec	Year
Record high °C (°F)	23.2 (73.8)	25.0 (77.0)	28.5 (83.3)	32.5 (90.5)	36.0 (96.8)	38.8 (101.8)	43.7 (110.7)	41.6 (106.9)	38.2 (100.8)	35.9 (96.6)	31.5 (88.7)	24.7 (76.5)	43.7 (110.7)
Mean daily maximum °C (°F)	16.5 (61.7)	17.0 (62.6)	19.1 (66.4)	21.8 (71.2)	25.7 (78.3)	29.7 (85.5)	32.7 (90.9)	33.4 (92.1)	31.3 (88.3)	27.4 (81.3)	22.4 (72.3)	18.1 (64.6)	24.6 (76.3)
Daily mean °C (°F)	12.4 (54.3)	12.8 (55.0)	14.9 (58.8)	17.8 (64.0)	21.8 (71.2)	25.9 (78.6)	28.9 (84.0)	29.5 (85.1)	27.1 (80.8)	22.9 (73.2)	17.9 (64.2)	14.1 (57.4)	20.5 (68.9)
Mean daily minimum °C (°F)	9.5 (49.1)	9.6 (49.3)	11.5 (52.7)	14.4 (57.9)	18.5 (65.3)	22.4 (72.3)	25.4 (77.7)	26.1 (79.0)	23.4 (74.1)	19.3 (66.7)	14.6 (58.3)	11.2 (52.2)	17.2 (62.9)
Record low °C (°F)	−1.9 (28.6)	−2.2 (28.0)	0.9 (33.6)	4.0 (39.2)	9.8 (49.6)	13.3 (55.9)	16.9 (62.4)	14.1 (57.4)	13.2 (55.8)	9.5 (49.1)	2.9 (37.2)	0.4 (32.7)	−2.2 (28.0)
Average precipitation mm (inches)	210.6 (8.29)	137.3 (5.41)	91.3 (3.59)	68.8 (2.71)	36.0 (1.42)	9.2 (0.36)	3.0 (0.12)	2.7 (0.11)	29.6 (1.17)	100.6 (3.96)	158.7 (6.25)	251.2 (9.89)	1,099 (43.28)
Average precipitation days (≥ 1.0 mm)	11.7	9.2	6.9	5.9	3.1	1.8	1.5	1.3	2.6	5.1	7.2	10.9	67.2
Average relative humidity (%)	62.4	61	62.4	66.6	68.3	66.8	66.5	65.5	60.7	58.2	58.7	63.5	63.4
Mean monthly sunshine hours	127.1	127.1	192.2	219.0	288.3	348.0	325.5	316.2	273.0	220.1	159.0	133.3	2,728.8
Mean daily sunshine hours	4.1	4.5	6.2	7.3	9.3	11.6	10.5	10.2	9.1	7.1	5.3	4.3	7.5
Source 1: NOAA, Turkish State Meteorological Service (extremes-sun)
Source 2: Meteomanz(extremes since 2012) Weather2

Alanya mean sea temperature
Jan	Feb	Mar	Apr	May	Jun	Jul	Aug	Sep	Oct	Nov	Dec
17.8 °C (64.0 °F)	16.9 °C (62.4 °F)	17.3 °C (63.1 °F)	17.9 °C (64.2 °F)	21.2 °C (70.2 °F)	25.3 °C (77.5 °F)	27.9 °C (82.2 °F)	29.0 °C (84.2 °F)	27.7 °C (81.9 °F)	24.9 °C (76.8 °F)	21.2 °C (70.2 °F)	19.0 °C (66.2 °F)

== Main sights ==
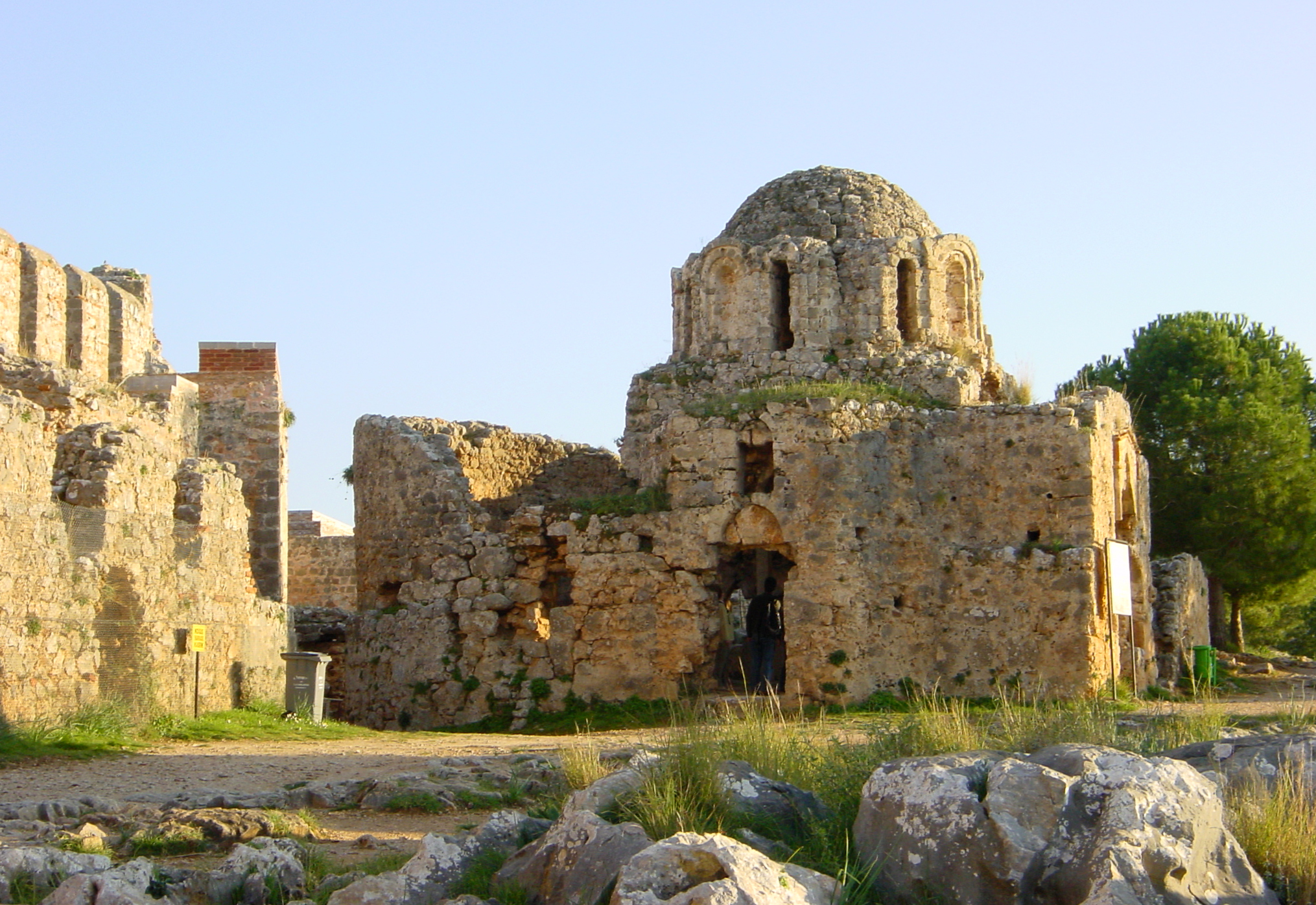
The Byzantine era Church of Saint Constantine inside Alanya Castle was also used as a mosque.

On the peninsula stands Alanya Castle, a Seljuk era citadel dating from 1226. Most major landmarks in the city are found inside and around the castle. The current castle was built over existing fortifications and served the double purpose of a palace of local government and as a defensive structure in case of attack. In 2007, the city began renovating various sections of the castle area, including adapting a Byzantine church for use as a Christian community center. Inside the castle is the Süleymaniye mosque and caravanserai, built by Suleiman the Magnificent. The old city walls surround much of the eastern peninsula, and can be walked. Inside the walls are numerous historic villas, well preserved examples of the classical period of Ottoman architecture, most built in the early 19th century.

The Kızıl Kule (Red Tower) is a 108-foot (33 m) high brick building, standing at the harbor below the castle, and containing the municipal ethnographic museum. Sultan Kayqubad I brought the architect Ebu Ali from Aleppo, Syria to Alanya to design the building. The last of Alanya Castle's 83 towers, the octagonal structure specifically protected the Tersane (dockyard), it remains one of the finest examples of medieval military architecture. The Tersane, a medieval drydock built by the Seljuk Turks in 1221, 187 by 131 feet (57 by 40 m), is divided into five vaulted bays with equilateral pointed arches. The Alara Castle and caravanserai near Manavgat, also built under Kayqubad's authority, has been converted into a museum and heritage center.

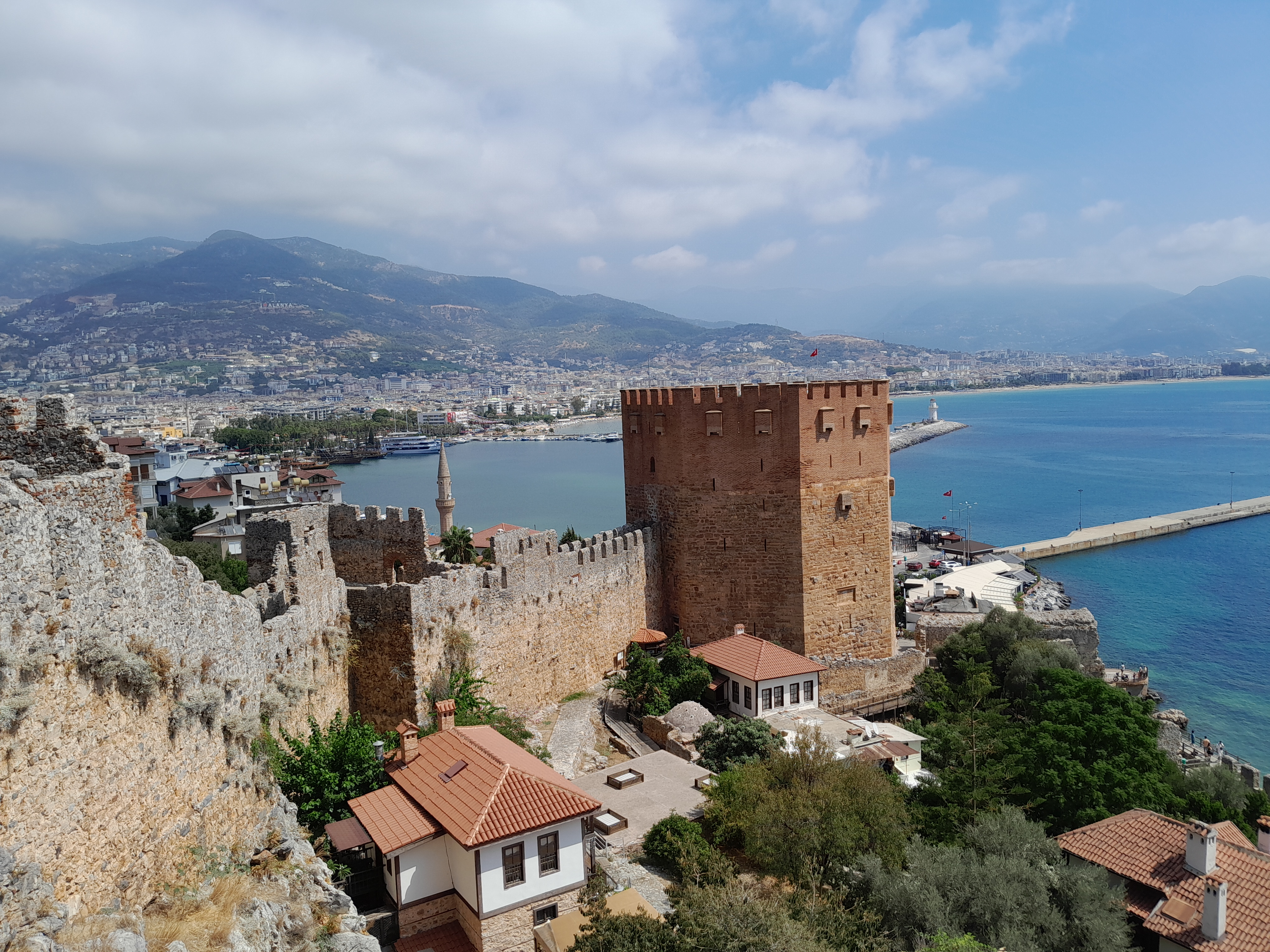
The Kızıl Kule is the main attraction in the city.

Atatürk's House and Museum, from his short stay in the city on February 18, 1935, is preserved in its historic state and is an example of the interior of a traditional Ottoman villa, with artifacts from the 1930s. The house was built between 1880 and 1885 in the "karniyarik" (stuffed eggplant) style. Bright colors and red roofs are often mandated by neighborhood councils, and give the modern town a pastel glow. Housed in a 1967 Republican era building, The Alanya Museum is inland from Damlataş Beach.

Alanya is a member of the Norwich-based European Association of Historic Towns and Regions. In 2009, city officials filed to include Alanya Castle and Tersane as UNESCO World Heritage Sites, and were named to the 2009 Tentative List.

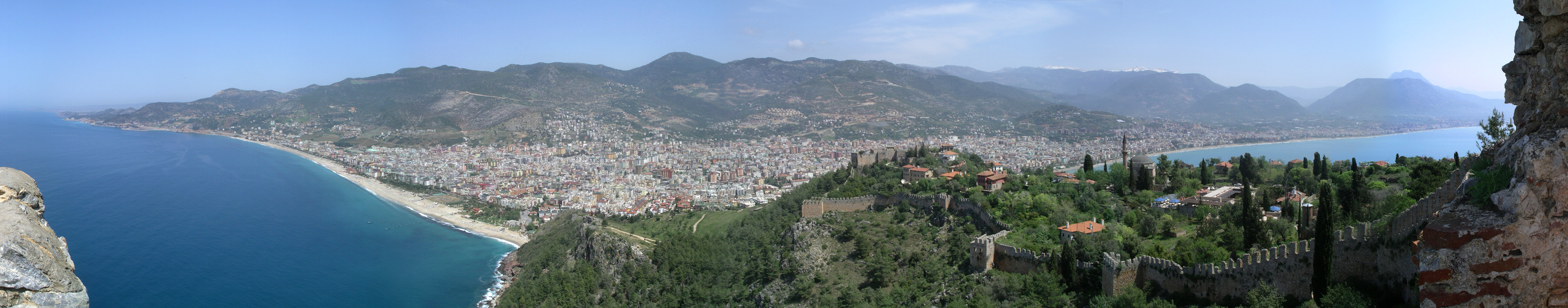
Panorama from west side of peninsula.

== Demographics ==
Historic populations
Year	District	City
1893	37914	
1965	43459	12436
1970	53552	15011
1975	63235	18520
1980	74148	22190
1985	87080	28733
1990	129106	52460
1997	235884	117311
2007	226236	91713
2012	264692	104573
2017	299464	-
2022	364180	-

From only 87,080 in 1985, the district has surged to hold a population of 364,180 in 2022. This population surge is largely credited to immigration to the city as a result or byproduct of the increased prominence of the real estate sector and the growth of the housing market bubble. In 2007, the city itself had a population of 134,396, of which 9,789 are European expatriates, about half of them from Germany and Denmark. 17,850 total foreigners own property in Alanya. There are a lot of Iranians who have settled in the city. During the Persian New Year a lot of Iranians go to Alanya for vacation. The European expatriate population tends to be over fifty years old. During the summer the population increases due to large numbers of tourists, about 1.1 million each year pass through the city. Both Turks and Europeans, these vacationers provide income for much of the population.

The city is home to many migrants from the Southeastern Anatolia Region and the Black Sea region. In the first decade of the 21st century, the town has seen a surge in illegal foreign immigrants from the Middle East and South Asia, both to stay and to attempt to enter European Union countries. As of 2006, 1,217 migrants claim residence in Alanya while working abroad. Yörük nomads also live in the Taurus Mountains north of the city on a seasonal basis. Additionally, there is a small African community descendant from imported Ottoman slaves. In 2018, it was estimated that around 300 Finns live permanently in Alanya and 3,000 during the Winter. According to the TÜİK Institute of Statistics, as of October 2022, 55,000 foreigners live in the city, more than half of them are Russian speakers.

Nationality
Foreigners in Alanya
1	Germany	10,000
2	Denmark	3,821
3	Finland	3,000
4	Russia	769
5	Netherlands	634
6	Norway	521
7	England	475
8	Azerbaijan	383
9	Sweden	303
10	Ukraine	297

The city is nearly 99% Muslim, and although many ancient churches can be found in the district, there are no weekly Christian services. In 2006, a German language Protestant church with seasonal service opened with much fanfare, after receiving permission to do so in 2003, a sign of the growing European population in the city. In 2015, the town began renovations of the Greek Orthodox Agios Georgios Church in the village of Hacı Mehmetli, and the church has been used for a monthly Russian Orthodox service. Alanya also provides the Atatürk Cultural Center to Christian groups on a regular basis for larger religious ceremonies.

== Education and health ==
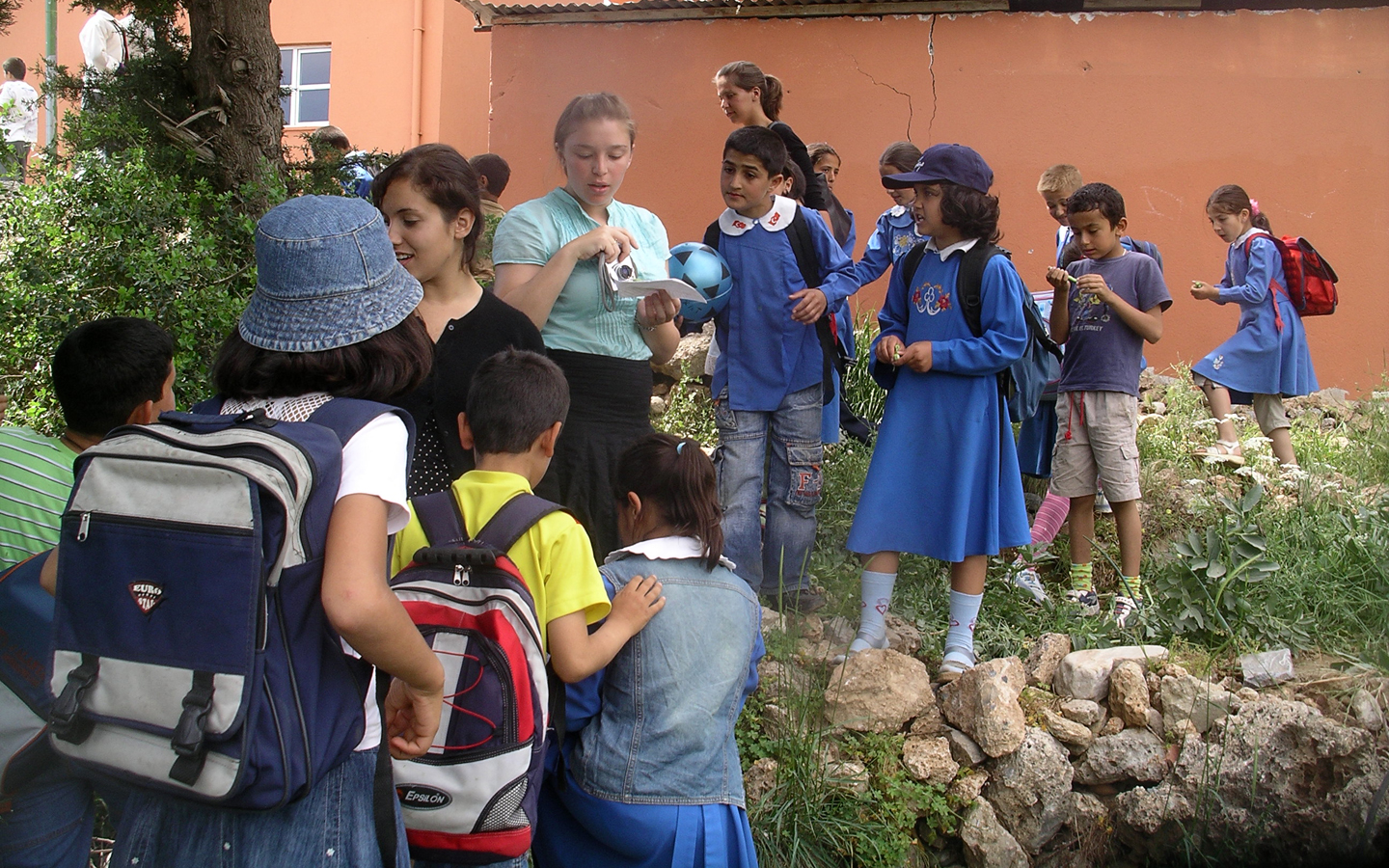
Young students from an Alanya school at their class garden

The city has 95% literacy, with public and private schools, and a roughly 1:24 student-teacher ratio. Rural villages are, however, disadvantaged by the limited number of secondary schools outside the city center. Alantur Primary School, which opened in 1987, was built and is maintained under the Turkish "Build Your Own School" initiative, supported by the foundation of Ayhan Şahenk, the founder of Doğuş Holding.

In 2005, Akdeniz University of Antalya launched the Alanya Faculty of Business, as a satellite campus that focuses on the tourism industry. The school hosts an International Tourism Conference annually in coordination with Buckinghamshire New University. The city also has plans to open a private university in 2012. Georgetown University operates an annual study abroad program for American students known as the McGhee Center for Eastern Mediterranean Studies, named for the United States Ambassador to Turkey from 1952 to 1953 George C. McGhee, and based in his villa. Başkent University Medical and Research Center of Alanya, a teaching hospital run by Başkent University in Ankara is one of nineteen hospitals in Alanya. Other major hospitals include the 300-bed Alanya State Hospital and the 90-bed Private Hayat Hospital.

== Culture ==
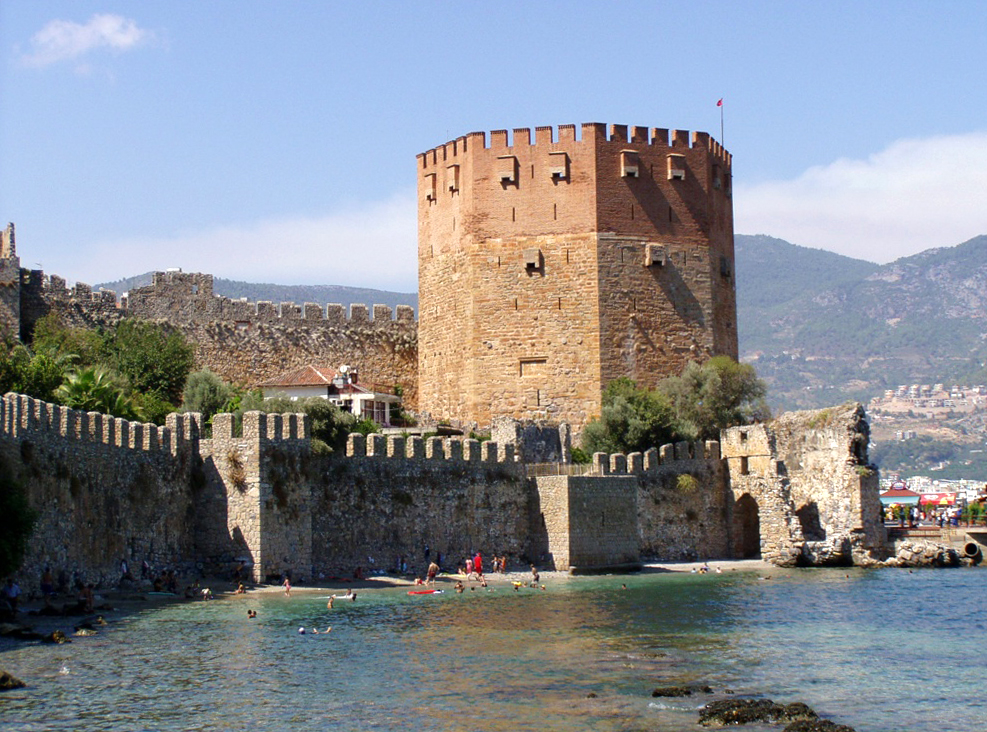
The Kızıl Kule, or Red Tower, is home to the city ethnographic museum.

Alanya's culture is a subculture of the larger Culture of Turkey. The city's seaside position is central to many annual festivals. These include the Tourism and Arts Festival, which marks the opening of the tourism season from at the end of May or beginning of June. At the opposite end of the season, the Alanya International Culture and Art Festival is held in the last week of May, and is a notable Turkish festival. Other regular festivals include the Alanya Jazz Days, which has been held since 2002 in September or October at the Kızıl Kule, which is otherwise home to the municipal ethnographic museum. The Jazz Festival hosts Turkish and international jazz musicians in a series of five free concerts.

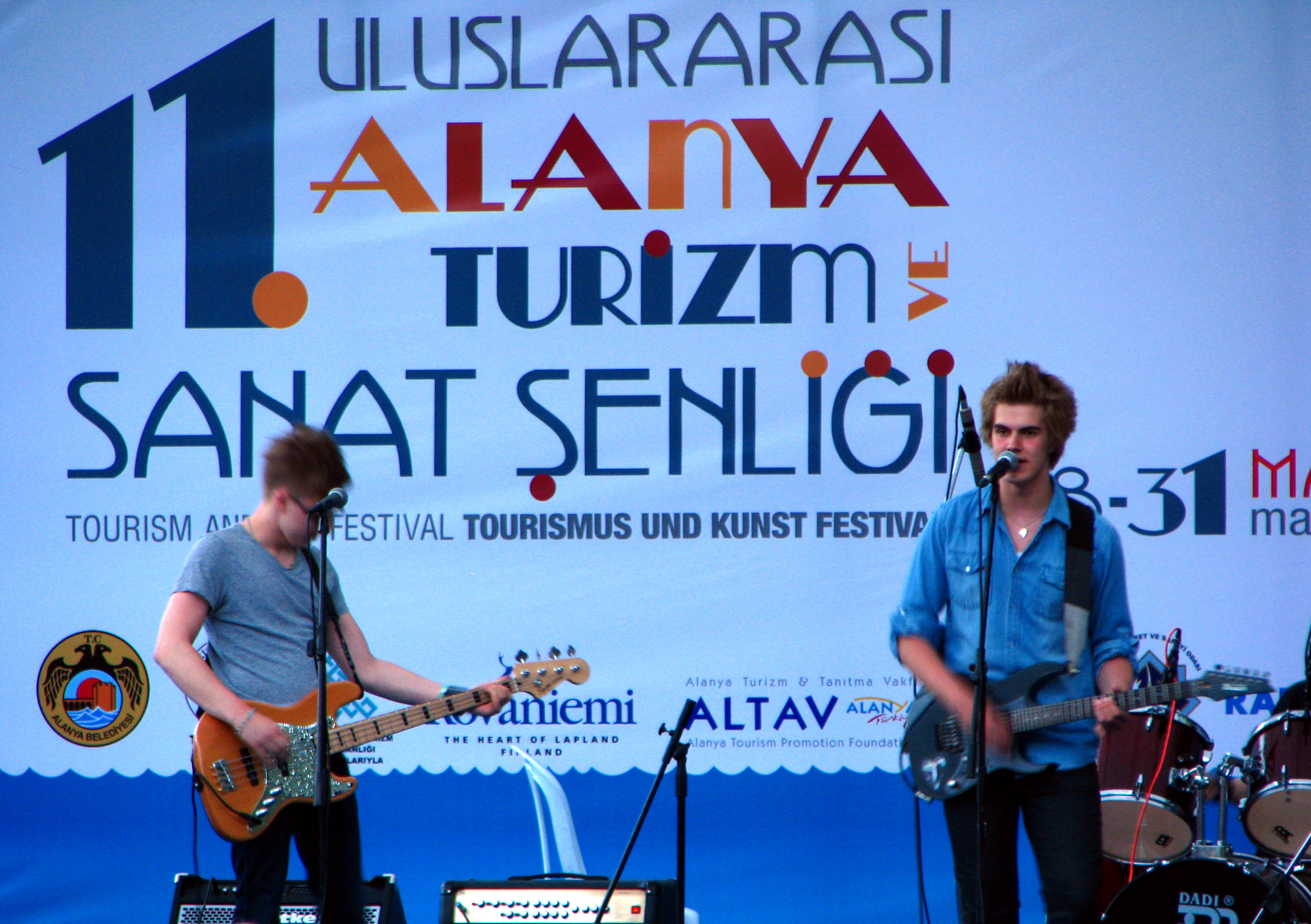
Rockcorn from Finland perform during the 2011 Alanya International Culture and Art Festival

The Alanya Chamber Orchestra, formed of members of the Antalya State Opera and Ballet, gave its inaugural performance on December 7, 2007. The International Alanya Stone Sculpture Symposium, begun is 2004, is held over the month of November. The Alanya Documentary Festival was launched in 2001 by the Alanya Cinémathèque Society and the Association of Documentary Filmmakers in Turkey. Onat Kutlar, Turkish poet and writer, and founder of the Istanbul International Film Festival was born in Alanya, as was actress Sema Önür.

Atatürk's visit to Alanya is also celebrated on its anniversary each February 18, centered on Atatürk's House and Museum. The Alanya Museum is home to archaeology found in and around the city, including a large bronze Hercules statue, ceramics, and Roman limestone ossuaries, as well as historic copies of the Qur'an. European residents of Alanya also often celebrate their national holidays, such as Norwegian Constitution Day, and the city set up a Christmas market in December 2010. Iranians also celebrate the Persian New Year, Nevruz, in Alanya.

== Government ==
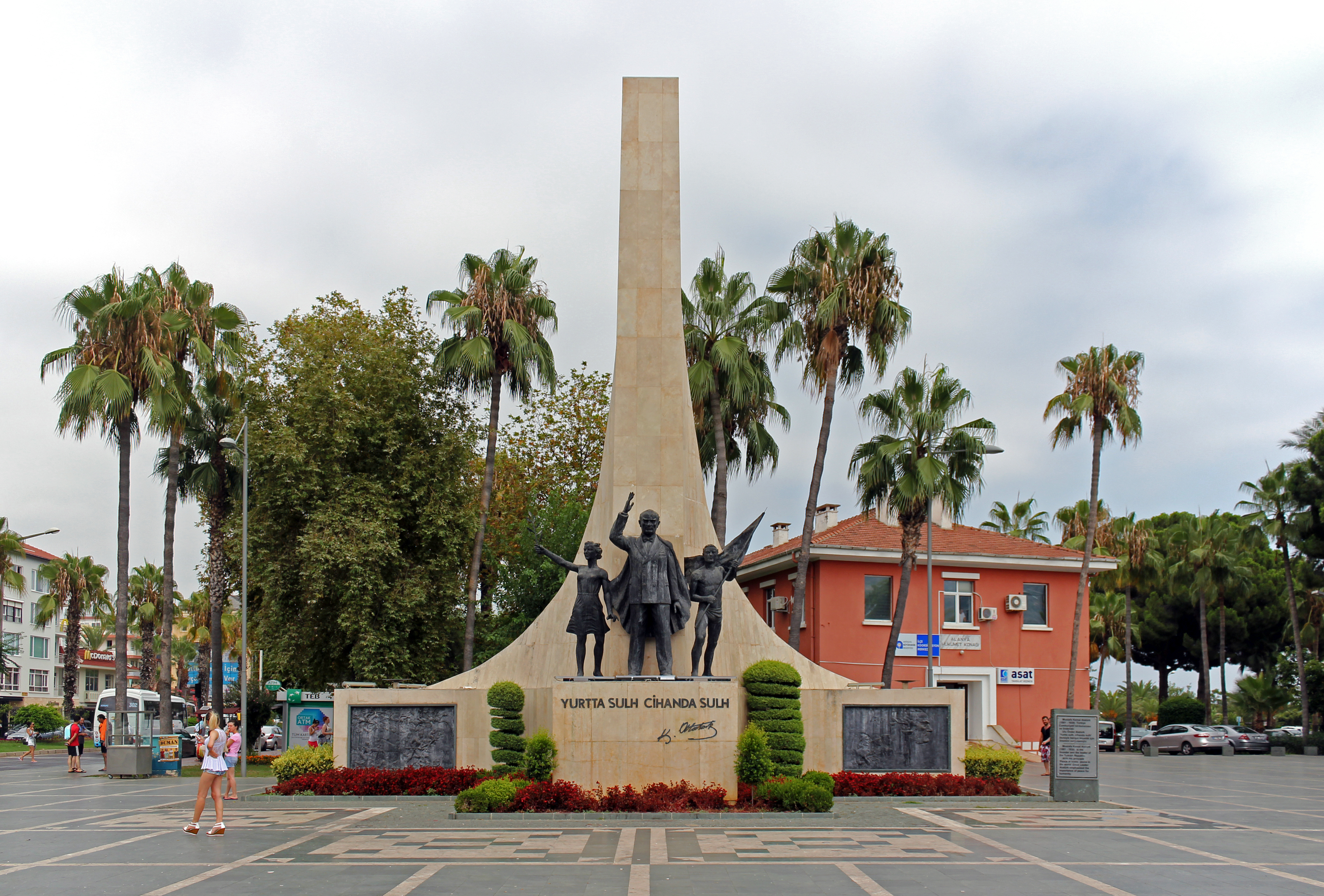
Many national celebrations are centered at the downtown Mustafa Kemal Atatürk monument.

Alanya was set up as a municipality in 1872, electing its first mayor in 1901. Today, Alanya is governed by a mayor and a municipality council made up of thirty-seven members. Twenty-four councilors are from the centre-left Republican People's Party, nine are from the far-right Nationalist Movement Party, and four are of the Good Party. Mayor Osman Tarık Özçelik of the Republican People's Party was elected in 2024 by unseating the incumbent Adem Murat Yücel, who had previously been mayor since 2014. Elections are held every five years, with the next to be held in March 2029.

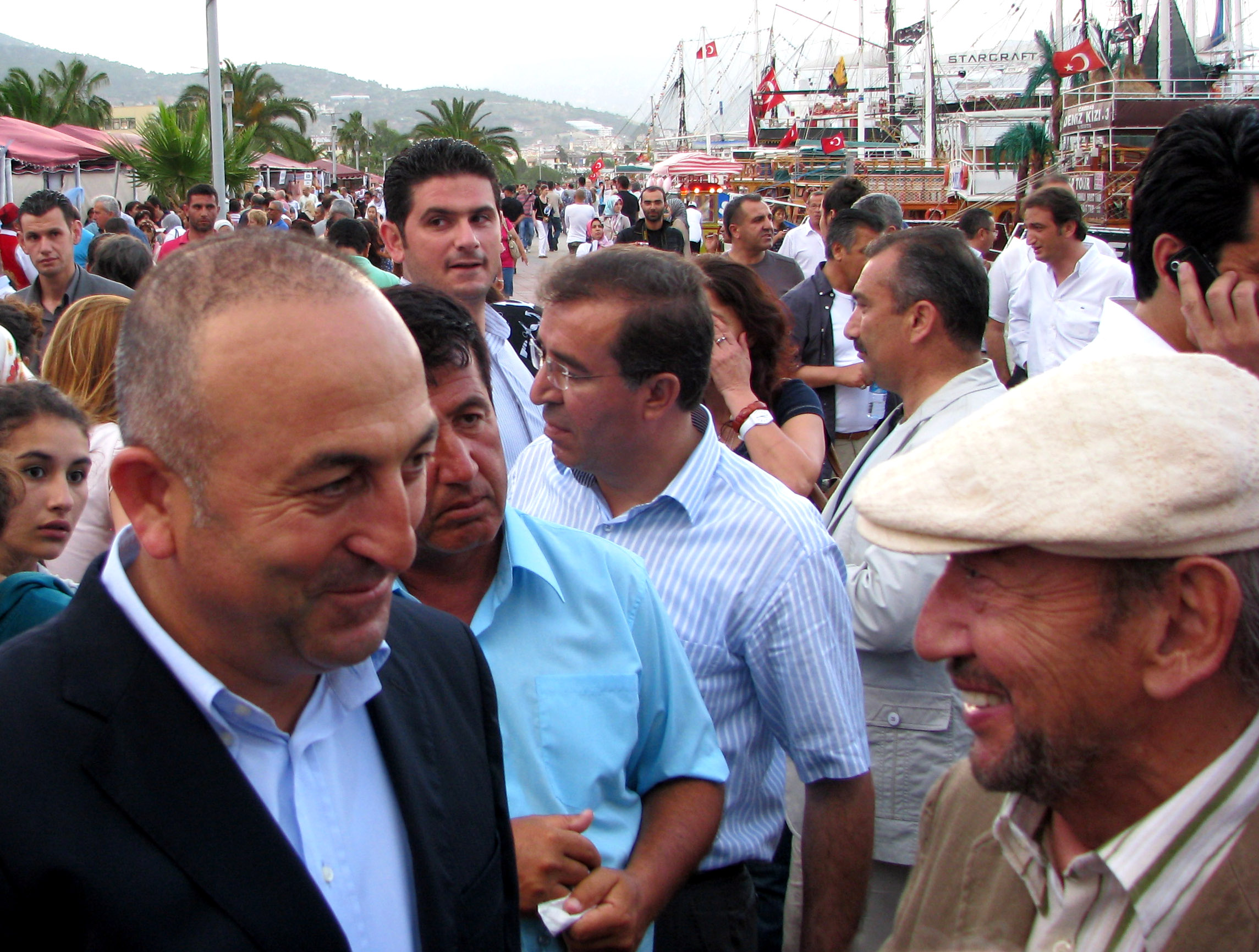
MP Mevlüt Çavuşoğlu (on the left) was also President of the Parliamentary Assembly of the Council of Europe.

Alanya District is divided up into 17 municipalities, including the city center, and 92 villages. Alanya is greatly influenced by the provincial government in Antalya, and the national government in Ankara, which appoints a governor for the district, currently Dr. Hulusi Doğan. Although Alanya has been part of Antalya Province since the Ottoman Empire, many local politicians have advocated a separate Alanya Province, a position supported by associations of foreign residents.

Nationally, in the 2007 election, the province voted with the Justice and Development Party, who were followed closely by the Republican People's Party and the True Path Party. Mevlüt Çavuşoğlu, of the Justice and Development Party, is the only native Alanyalilar Member of Parliament representing Antalya Province in the Grand National Assembly, where he chairs the Committee on Migration, Refugees and Population. Çavuşoğlu is the current Turkish Foreign Minister and also served as the president of the Parliamentary Assembly of the Council of Europe.

== Economy ==
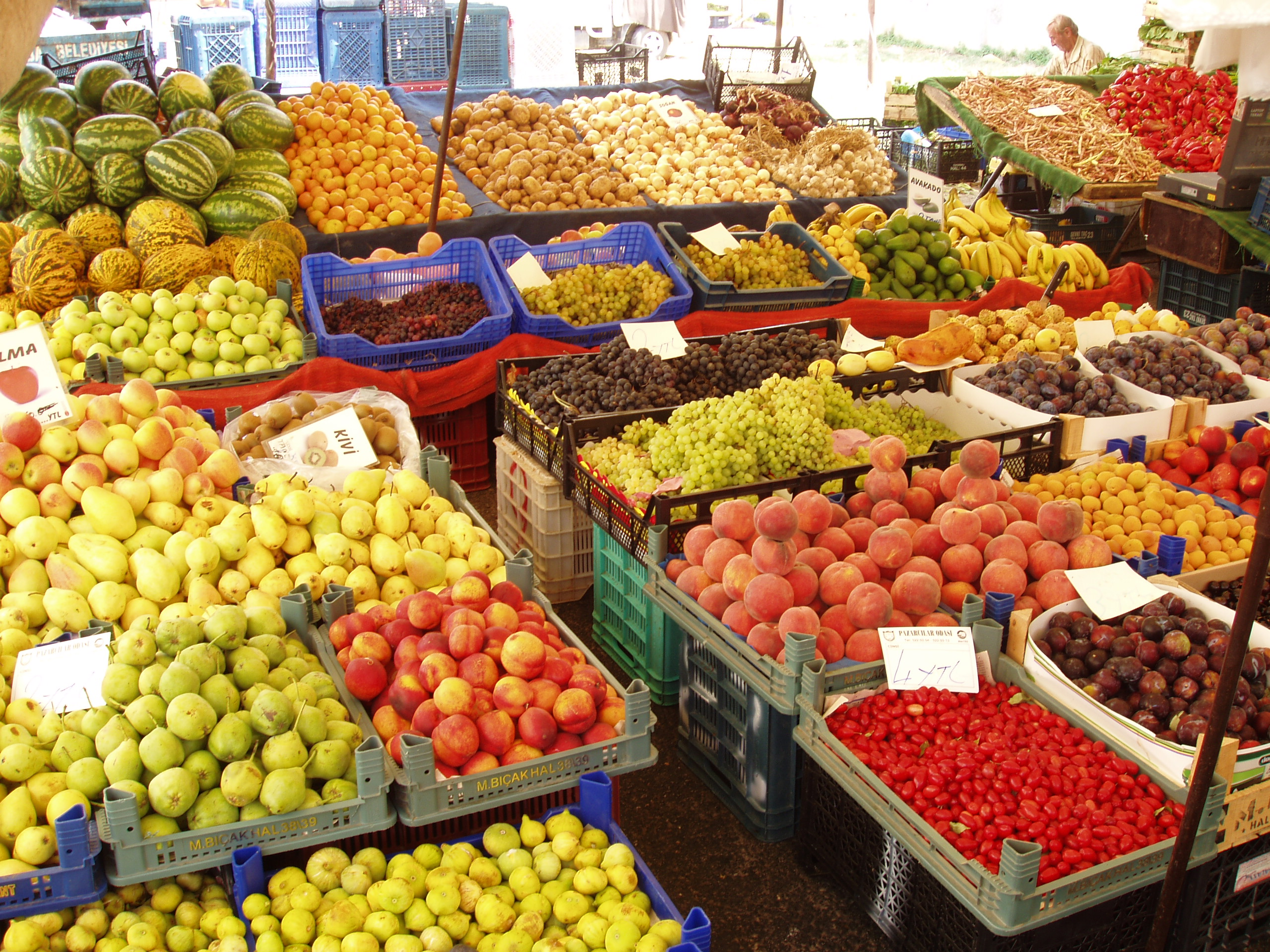
Locally grown fruits for sale in a market in the farming district of Obaköy, outside Alanya

The tourist industry in Alanya is worth just under 1.1 billion euros per year, and is therefore the principal industry. The area has many fruit farms, particularly lemons and oranges, and large harvests of tomatoes, bananas and cucumbers. About 80,000 tonnes of citrus fruits were produced in 2006 across 16,840 hectares (41,600 acres). The greengage plum and the avocado are increasingly popular early season fruits where citrus fruits are becoming unprofitable.

Despite the seaside location, few residents make their living on the sea, and fishing is not a major industry. In the early 1970s, when fish stocks ran low, a system of rotating access was developed to preserve this sector. This innovative system was part of Elinor Ostrom's research on economic governance which led to her 2009 Nobel Prize in Economics. In 2007, locals protested the establishment of some larger chain supermarkets and clothing stores, which have opened branches in Alanya.

Beginning in 2003, with the provisional elimination of restrictions on land purchases by non-nationals, the housing industry in the city has become highly profitable with many new private homes and condominiums being built for European and Asian part-time residents. Sixty-nine percent of homes purchased by foreign nationals in the Antalya Province and 29.9% in all of Turkey are in Alanya. Buyers are primarily individuals, rather than investors. This housing boom put pressure on the city's many gecekondu houses and establishments as property values rise and property sales to locals fall. A height restriction in the city limits most buildings to 21 feet (6.5 m). This keeps high rise hotels to the east and west of the city, preserving the central skyline at the expense of greater tourist potential. The fringes of the city however have seen uncontrolled expansion.

=== Tourism ===
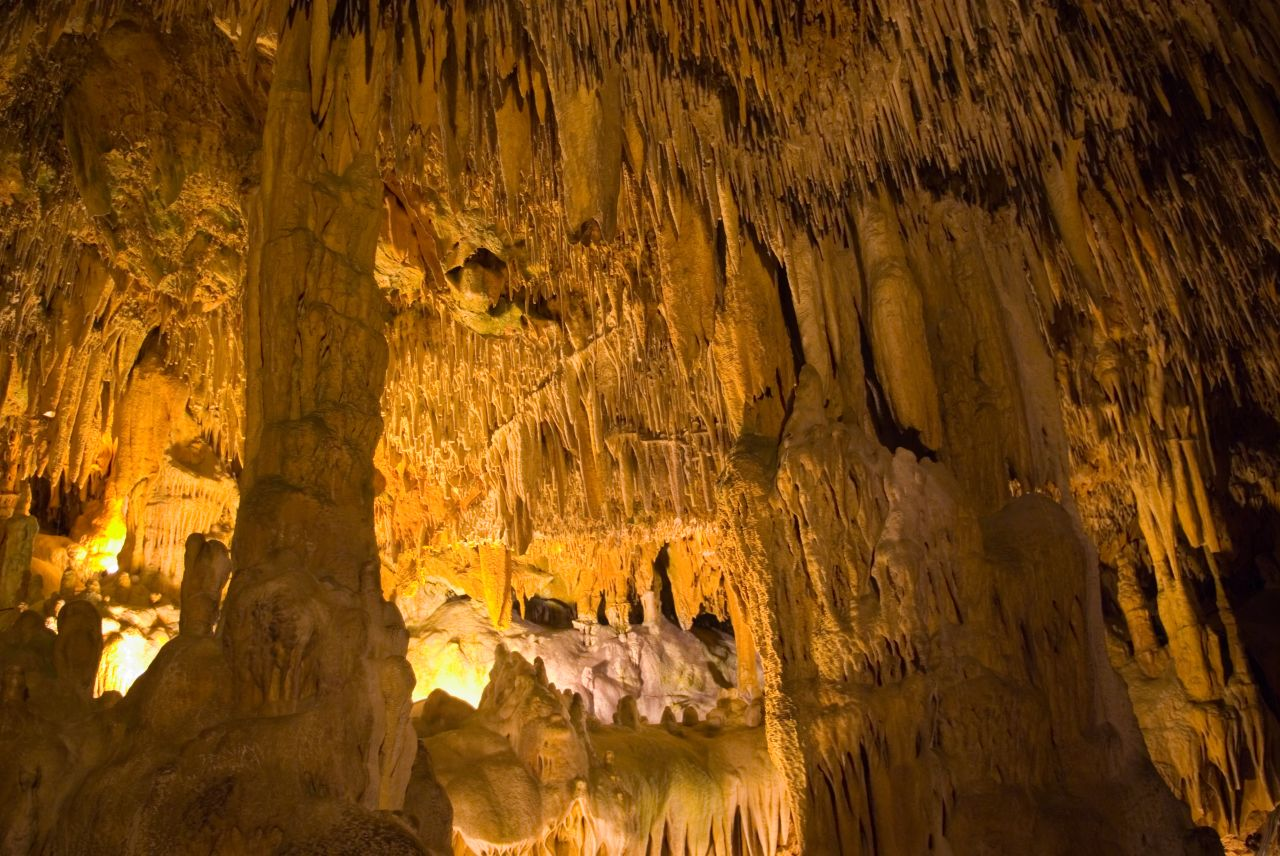
Tourism began following the opening of Damlataş Cave in the 1950s.

Since the first modern motel was built in 1958, considered the first year of the tourist industry in Alanya, hotels have raced to accommodate the influx of tourists, and the city as of 2007 claims 157,000 hotel beds. Damlataş Cave, which originally sparked the arrival of outsiders because of the cave's microclimate, with an average temperature of 72 °F (22 °C) and 95% humidity, is accessible on the west side of the peninsula with trails from Damlataş Beach. Many tourists, especially Scandinavians, Germans, Russians, and Dutch, regularly vacation in Alanya during the warmer months. They are drawn to the area because of property prices, warm weather, sandy beaches, famous Turkish Hammam and access to Antalya's historic sites, and fine cuisine.

Other outdoor tourist activities include wind surfing, parasailing, and banana boating. Attractions include Europe's largest waterpark, Sealanya, and Turkey's largest go-kart track. Hunting season also attracts some tourist for wild goat, pig and partridge hunting in area nature reserves.

== Media ==
Alanya has 10 local daily newspapers. One of these is Yeni Alanya, which includes the news and lifestyles magazine Orange and is available in English, German and Turkish. Two native German language newspapers are published in Alanya, the Aktuelle Türkei Rundschau and Alanya Bote for the community of German speaking residents and visitors. A monthly magazine Hello Alanya published in Alanya for foreigners, appearing in English and Dutch. The free regional newspaper, Riviera News, is printed in English and is widely available in Alanya.

Five radio stations broadcast from the city. Alanya FM Radyo broadcasts on 106.0 FM and is partnered with Radio Flash, on 94.0 FM, both broadcasting popular music. Other stations include Alanya RadyoTime on 92.3 FM, which broadcasts a variety of Turkish music, news, and talk programming. Two television stations are local to Alanya, Kanal Alanya, and Alanya Televizyonu, abbreviated ATV, which is partnered with Alanya RadyoTime.

== Transportation ==
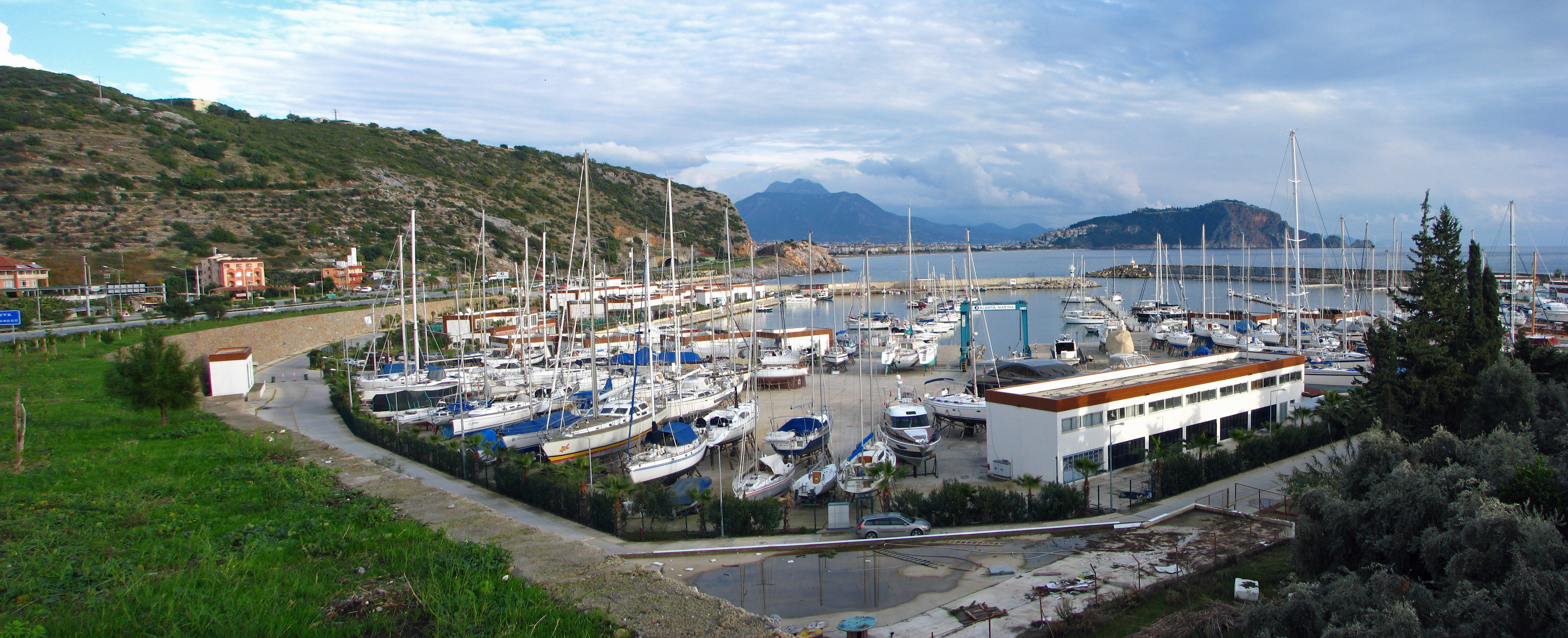
Alanya Marina was opened in 2010 at a cost of $10 million with space for 437 boats.

The D 400 Highway, the Alanya–Mersin Route, connects Alanya from the east and west, encircling it, and linking through the city center via Atatürk Bulvarı. The D695, the Ankara–Akşehir Route, runs north–south and reaches the sea 41 kilometres (25 mi) west of the city near Side, connecting with the D400. Antalya Airport is 121 kilometres (75 mi) away and connects internationally. The new Antalya Gazipaşa Airport, first begun in 1992, is only 14.5 kilometres (9.0 mi) from the city, and was expected to have its first regular domestic flights on May 22, 2010, although international flights were not expected before the start of the 2011 tourist season. No train routes go to Alanya or Antalya Province, and there are no train stations in the district.

There are bus and dolmuş systems out of Alanya's two bus depots, but buses are usually limited to the major roads, and inside the city transportation is by car, taxi, or foot, as many roads in the old town are closed to vehicle traffic. The harbor includes cruise ship piers, and also seasonal ferries and hydrofoils depart for Kyrenia in the Turkish Republic of Northern Cyprus. Cruise ships docking at Alanya have increased 50% in 2013, with 53 estimated to have brought 56,000 passengers the end of the year. Further west of the city is the Alanya Marina, which started services in 2008 while still under construction, completing its expansion in 2010. The 85-km^{2} (33-sq-mi) marina allowed Alanya to participate in the 2008 Eastern Mediterranean Yacht Rally. The city is also investing in a community bicycle program with 150 bicycles and twenty terminals.

== Sports ==
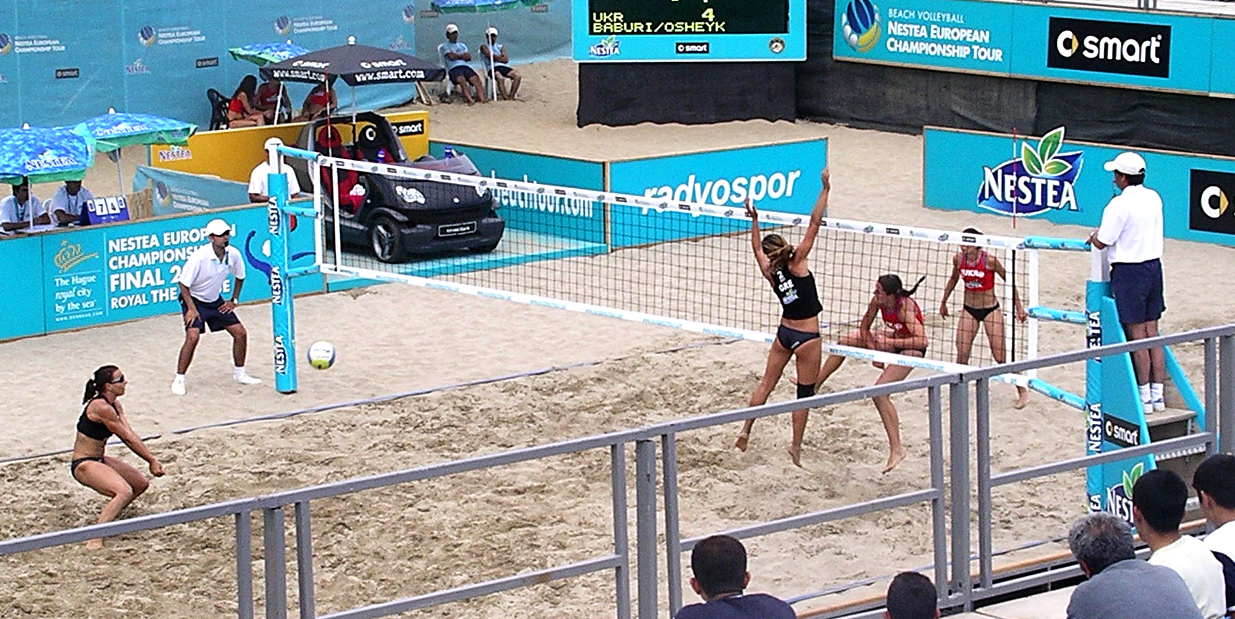
Women's teams in the 2006 beach volleyball tournament

Alanya is home to a woman's basketball team, Alanya Belediye, which started in the first division but was relegated after the 2002 season. The city hosts a Süper Lig soccer team, Alanyaspor. The club was founded in 1948, and play home games at Milli Egemenlik Stadium. It played in the Second League between 1988-1997 and 2014–2016. The club finally promoted to top level in 2015–16 season where they have played in to this day. In 2007, the city began constructing a new soccer facility with the intention of hosting winter competitions between major teams. The public Alanya Municipality Sports Facility is located adjacent to Milli Egemenlik Stadium, which is one of thirteen facilities.

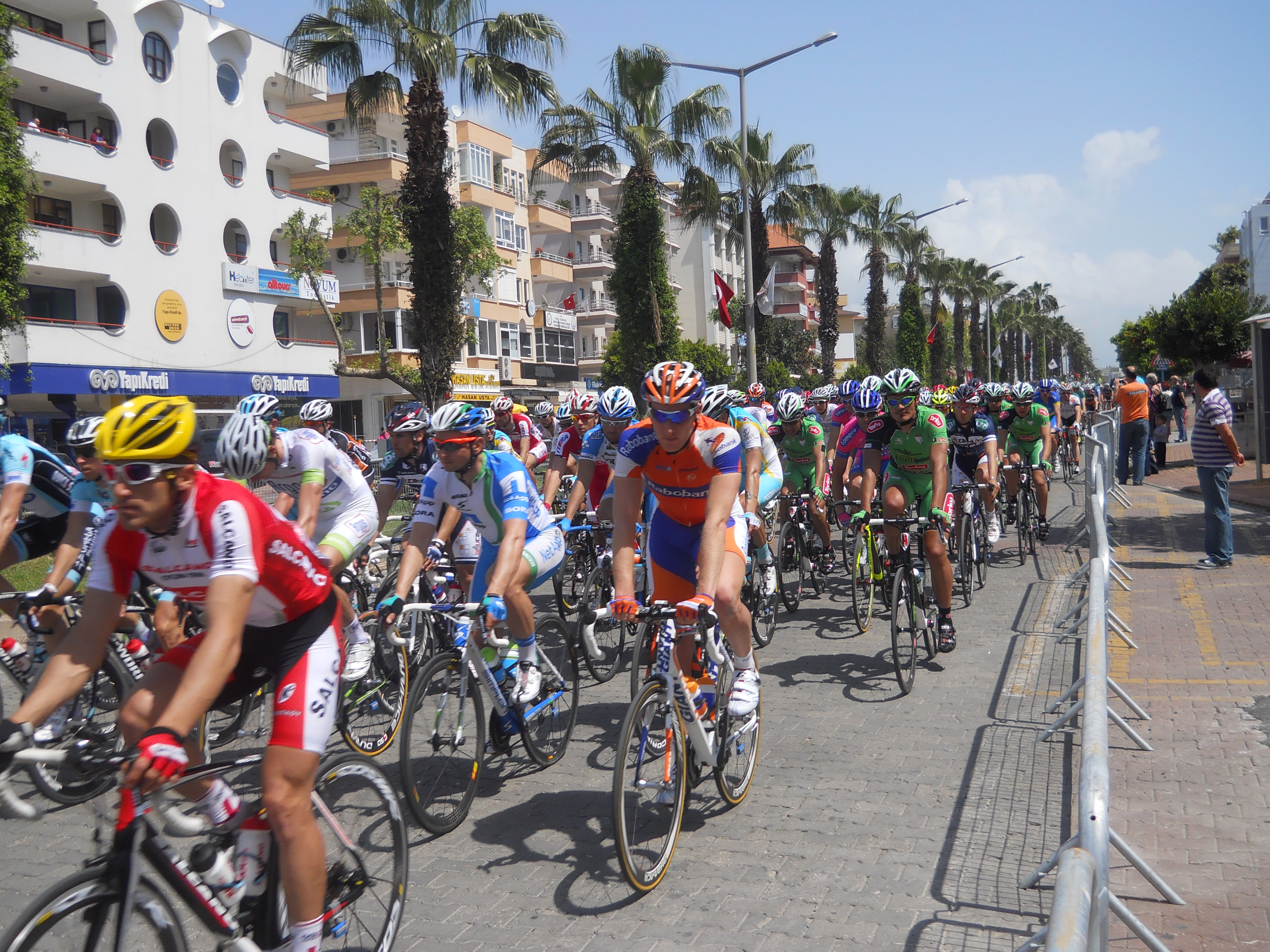
The Presidential Cycling Tour of Turkey features a stage in Alanya every year.

Alanya's waterfront location makes it suitable for certain events, and is perhaps most famous for its annual triathlon, part of the International Triathlon Union series, which has been held every October since 1990. Marathon swimming competitions have also been connected to the triathlon since 1992. Building on the triathlon's success, Alanya hosted a modern pentathlon in 2009. Alanya is also the regular host of The Turkish Open, part of the Nestea European Beach Volleyball championship tour, which takes place in May. In 2007, the Turkish Volleyball Federation persuaded the European Volleyball Confederation to build a beach volleyball training facility in Alanya, and make it the exclusive "center of beach volleyball in Europe".

The city is also a frequent host to national events, such as the annual beach handball tournament. Alanya is the traditional finish site of the seven-day Presidential Cycling Tour of Turkey, though organizers reversed the route in 2012, and started the event in Alanya instead. Other cycling events include the Alanya International Mountain Bike Race. Additionally, the European Cycling Union had its 2010 European road cycling championship and 2010 ordinary congress meeting in Alanya.

Recently the city also hosted 22nd Alanya International Culture, Art, and Tourism Festival, Alanya International Piano Competition and Festival and Europe Triathlon Cup Alanya all in 2024.

== Tombs ==
Akşebe Sultan, who served as the first commander of Alanya Castle under Kayqubad I, lies inside the mausoleum named after him within the castle walls. Along the road leading up to the castle, perched atop a large rock formation, stands the tomb of Sitti Zeynep, a figure mentioned in Evliya Çelebi’s Seyahatnâme. Meanwhile, the Sufi mystic Mahmud Seydî, widely regarded as one of the Horasan saints, is buried in his mausoleum in the local neighborhood that carries his name, Mahmutseydi.

== Neighbourhoods ==
There are 103 neighbourhoods in Alanya District:

- Akçatı
- Akdam
- Alacami
- Alara
- Aliefendi
- Asmaca
- Avsallar
- Bademağacı
- Basırlı
- Başköy
- Bayırköy
- Bayırkozağacı
- Bektaş
- Beldibi
- Beyreli
- Bıçakçı
- Bucakköy
- Burçaklar
- Büyükhasbahçe
- Büyükpınar
- Çakallar
- Çamlıca
- Çarşı
- Cikcilli
- Çıplaklı
- Cumhuriyet
- Değirmendere
- Demirtaş
- Dereköy
- Dinek
- Elikesik
- Emişbeleni
- Fakırcalı
- Fığla
- Gözübüyük
- Gözüküçüklü
- Güllerpınarı
- Gümüşgöze
- Gümüşkavak
- Güneyköy
- Güzelbağ
- Hacet
- Hacıkerimler
- Hacımehmetli
- Hisariçi
- Hocalar
- İmamlı
- İncekum
- İshaklı
- İspatlı
- Kadıpaşa
- Karakocalı
- Karamanlar
- Karapınar
- Kargıcak
- Kayabaşı
- Keşefli
- Kestel
- Kızılcaşehir
- Kızlarpınarı
- Kocaoğlanlı
- Konaklı
- Küçükhasbahçe
- Kuzyaka
- Mahmutlar
- Mahmutseydi
- Oba
- Obaalacami
- Okurcalar
- Orhanköy
- Ortakonuş
- Öteköy
- Özvadi
- Paşaköy
- Payallar
- Saburlar
- Sapadere
- Saray
- Şekerhane
- Seki
- Şıhlar
- Soğukpınar
- Sugözü
- Süleymanlar
- Taşbaşı
- Tepe
- Tırılar
- Tophane
- Toslak
- Tosmur
- Türkler
- Türktaş
- Uğrak
- Uğurlu
- Üzümlü
- Uzunöz
- Yalçı
- Yasırali
- Yaylakonak
- Yaylalı
- Yenice
- Yeniköy
- Yeşilöz

== International relations ==
The most significant tie is with the city of Nea Ionia, where many of Alanya's Christians were resettled in 1923 after the Treaty of Lausanne. Alanya is twinned with:

- Dergachyovsky District, Russia
- Fushun, China
- Geoagiu, Romania
- Gladbeck, Germany
- Goa, India
- Keszthely, Hungary
- Mahdia, Tunisia
- Ankara, Turkey
- Nea Ionia, Greece
- Murmansk, Russia
- Oer-Erkenschwick, Germany
- Rovaniemi, Finland
- Šilutė, Lithuania
- South-Eastern AO (Moscow), Russia
- Špindlerův Mlýn, Czech Republic
- Talsi, Latvia
- Trakai, Lithuania
- Wodzisław Śląski, Poland
- Wronki, Poland
- Zelenogorsk, Russia
- Borås, Sweden

=== Friendly cities ===
- Nowy Sącz, Poland
- Turek, Poland

== Notable residents ==
- Mevlüt Çavuşoğlu, Turkish diplomat and politician; former Minister of Foreign Affairs of Turkey
- George C. McGhee, U.S. diplomat and ambassador to Turkey

== See also ==
- List of governors of Alanya
- List of mayors of Alanya
