= Basırlı, Alanya =

Basırlı
- Neighbourhood
- Location in Turkey
- Coordinates: 36°33′41″N 32°3′52″E
- Country: Turkey
- Province: Antalya
- District: Alanya
- Population (2022): 306
- Time zone: UTC+3 (TRT)

Basırlı is a neighbourhood in the municipality and district of Alanya, Antalya Province, Turkey. Its population is 306 (2022).
