= Uğurlu, Alanya =

Uğurlu
- Neighbourhood
- Location in Turkey
- Coordinates: 36°35′55″N 32°10′01″E
- Country: Turkey
- Province: Antalya
- District: Alanya
- Population (2022): 215
- Time zone: UTC+3 (TRT)

Uğurlu is a neighbourhood in the municipality and district of Alanya, Antalya Province, Turkey. Its population is 215 (2022).

== Economy ==
The economy is primarily based on agriculture and livestock.
