= Yaylalı, Alanya =

Yaylalı
- Neighbourhood
- Location in Turkey
- Coordinates: 36.5144°N 32.1059°E
- Country: Turkey
- Province: Antalya
- District: Alanya
- Population (2022): 1,272
- Time zone: UTC+3 (TRT)

Yaylalı is a neighbourhood in the municipality and district of Alanya, Antalya Province, Turkey. Its population is 1,272 (2022).
