= Red Tower (Alanya) =

Coordinates: 36.53651°N 31.99797°E

- Kızıl Kule
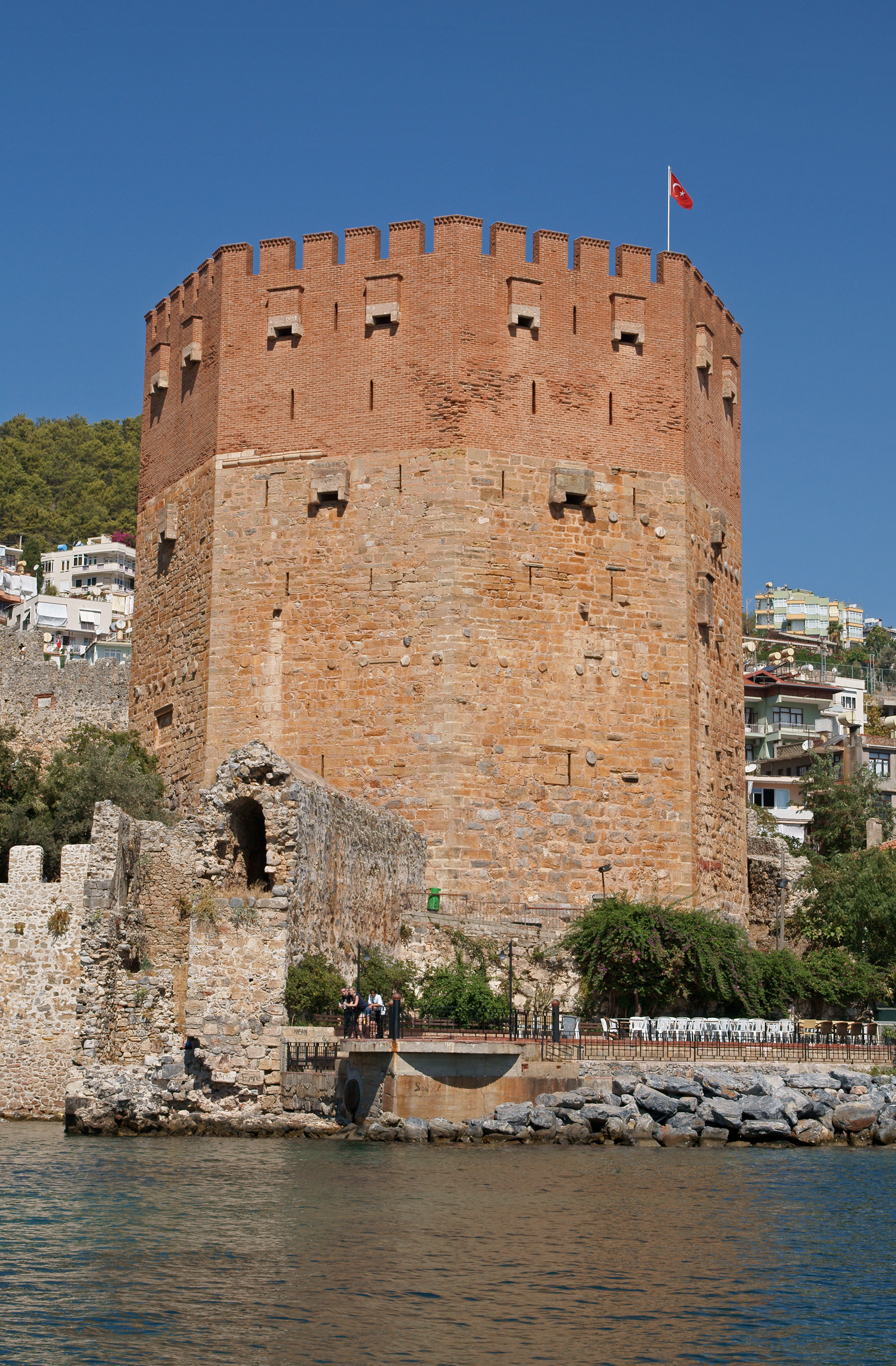
- The Tower as seen from the water
- Interactive map of the Red Tower area

General information
- Type: Tower
- Architectural style: Seljuk
- Location: Alanya, Turkey
- Completed: 1226

Height
- Height: 33 m

Dimensions
- Diameter: 29 m

The Red Tower (Turkish: Kızıl Kule) is a historical tower in the Turkish city of Alanya. The building is considered to be the symbol of the city, and is used on the city's flag.

== History ==
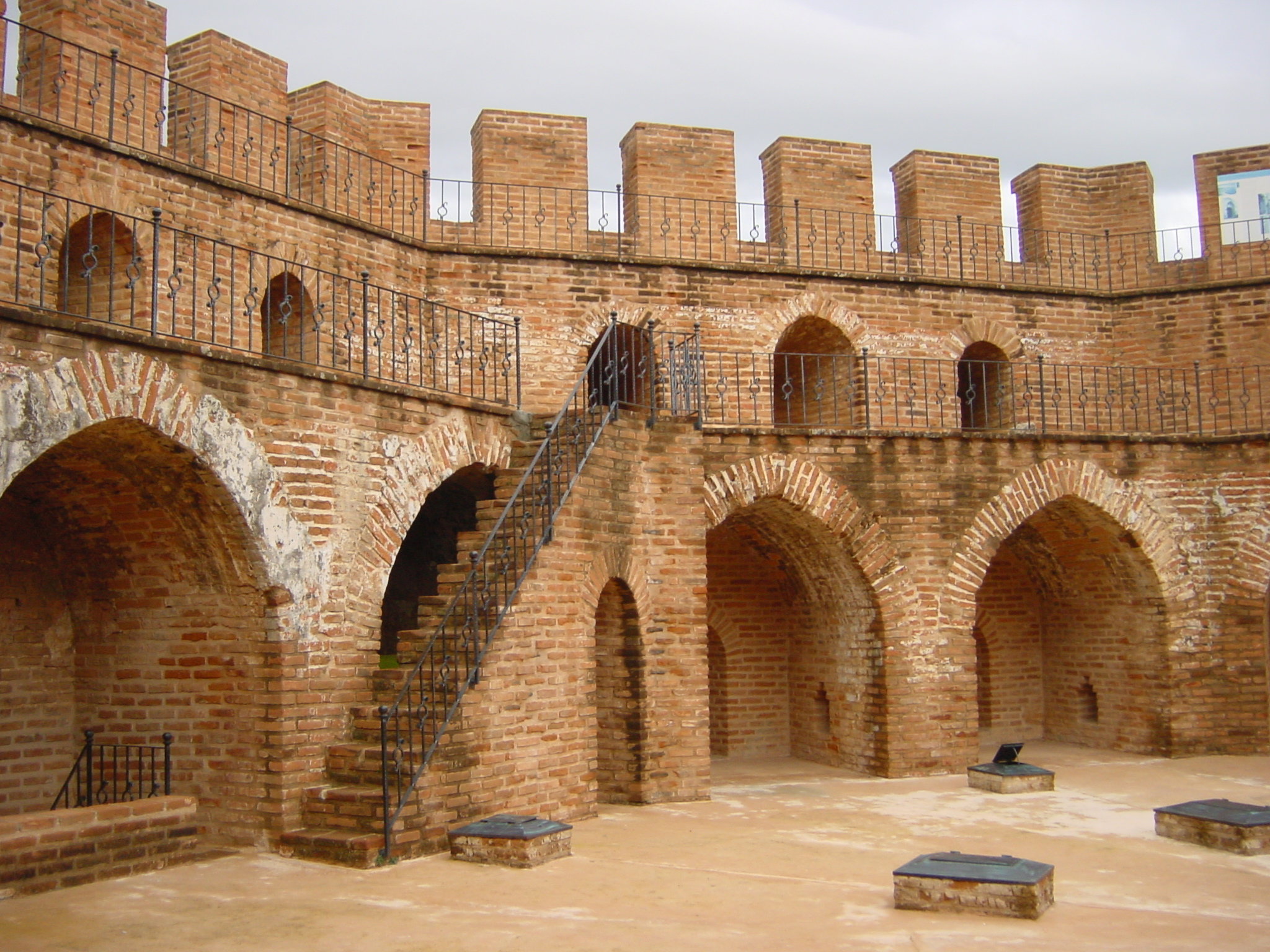
Interior view.

Construction of the building began in the early reign of the Anatolian Seljuq Sultan Ala ad-Din Kay Qubadh I and was completed in 1226. The sultan brought the accomplished architect Ebu Ali Reha from Aleppo, Syria, to Alanya to complete the building. The octagonal red brick tower protects the Tersane (shipyard) which dates from 1221.

The name derives from the more red color brick he used in its construction. The building itself is 33 m (108 ft) high and 12.5 m (41 ft) wide. It remains a fine example of medieval military architecture, and is the best preserved Seljuk building in the city.

In 1979 the city opened the Ethnographic Museum of Alanya inside of the tower. Besides providing visitors with a history of the tower and town, the museum gives attention to the heraldry, in particular the Seljuq double headed eagle that is used on the city flag.

The tower was depicted on the reverse of the Turkish 250,000 lira banknotes from 1992 to 2005.
