= Yaylakonak, Alanya =

Yaylakonak
- Neighbourhood
- Location in Turkey
- Coordinates: 36.5124°N 32.2511°E
- Country: Turkey
- Province: Antalya
- District: Alanya
- Population (2022): 294
- Time zone: UTC+3 (TRT)

Yaylakonak is a neighbourhood in the municipality and district of Alanya, Antalya Province, Turkey. Its population is 294 (2022).
