= Asmaca, Alanya =

Asmaca
- Neighbourhood
- Location in Turkey
- Coordinates: 36.6183°N 32.0693°E
- Country: Turkey
- Province: Antalya
- District: Alanya
- Population (2022): 218
- Time zone: UTC+3 (TRT)

Asmaca is a neighbourhood in the municipality and district of Alanya, Antalya Province, Turkey. Its population is 218 (2022).
