= Bucakköy, Alanya =

Bucakköy
- Neighbourhood
- Location in Turkey
- Coordinates: 36°34′27″N 32°16′18″E
- Country: Turkey
- Province: Antalya
- District: Alanya
- Population (2022): 150
- Time zone: UTC+3 (TRT)

Bucakköy (also: Bucak) is a neighbourhood in the municipality and district of Alanya, Antalya Province, Turkey. Its population is 150 (2022).
