= Beldibi, Alanya =

Beldibi
- Neighbourhood
- Location in Turkey
- Coordinates: 36°27′06″N 32°19′03″E
- Country: Turkey
- Province: Antalya
- District: Alanya
- Population (2022): 240
- Time zone: UTC+3 (TRT)

Beldibi is a neighbourhood in the municipality and district of Alanya, Antalya Province, Turkey. Its population is 240 (2022).
