= List of castles in Turkey =

Castles in Turkey were built in Ancient and Medieval Times. The Turkish words for castle are kale, şato, and hisar. Thus, the names of many castles carry the -kale or -hisarı suffixes.

Province	Name	Image or coordinates	Era of initial construction / present remains
Adana Province	Yılankale		Crusaders; Armenian Kingdom of Cilicia
Adana Province	Yumurtalık/Ayas		Crusaders; Armenian Kingdom of Cilicia
Adana Province	Anavarza Castle		Roman Empire; Armenian Kingdom of Cilicia, Crusaders
Adana Province	Kız Kalesi		Armenian Kingdom of Cilicia
Adana Province	Tumlu	37°9′1″N 35°42′5″E	Armenian Kingdom of Cilicia
Adana Province	Kozan Castle		Assyrians; Armenian Kingdom of Cilicia, Mamluks
Adana Province	Köroğlu	38°56′54″N 30°52′48″E	Unknown
Afyonkarahisar Province	Afyonkarahisar Castle		Hittites; Seljuks of Rum
Amasya Province	Amasya Castle		Roman Empire
Ankara Province	Ankara Castle		Roman Empire
Antalya Province	Alara Castle		Armenian Kingdom of Cilicia
Antalya Province	Alanya Castle		Seljuks of Rum
Antalya Province	Gazipaşa	36°15′31″N 32°16′57″E	Armenian Kingdom of Cilicia
Antalya Province	Simena Castle		Seljuks of Rum
Antalya Province	Dereağzı	36°20′1″N 29°48′59″E	Unknown
Ardahan Province	Ardahan Castle		Ottoman Empire; Seljuks
Ardahan Province	Kazan Castle		Turkmen
Ardahan Province	Savaşır Castle		Unknown
Ardahan Province	Şeytan Castle		Urartu
Bartın Province	Amasra Castle		Roman Empire
Bayburt Province	Bayburt Castle		Unknown
Çanakkale Province	Bozcaada Castle		Ottoman Empire
Çanakkale Province	Kilitbahir Castle		Ottoman Empire
Çanakkale Province	Çimenlik Castle		Ottoman Empire
Diyarbakır Province	Zerzevan Castle		Roman Empire
Elazığ Province	Harput Castle		Urartu
Eskişehir Province	Karacahisar Castle		Byzantine Empire
Gaziantep Province	Birecik Castle		Assyria
Gaziantep Province	Gaziantep Castle		Roman Empire
Giresun Province	Giresun Castle		Hellenistic Period
Hatay Province	Bagras Castle		Byzantine Empire
Hatay Province	Koz Castle		Crusaders
Isparta Province	Eğirdir Castle		Byzantine Empire
Istanbul Province	Anadoluhisarı		Ottoman Empire
Istanbul Province	Riva Castle		Byzantine Empire
Istanbul Province	Rumelihisarı		Ottoman Empire
Istanbul Province	Rumeli Feneri Castle		Byzantine Empire; Republic of Genoa
Istanbul Province	Yoros Castle		Phoenicia; Republic of Genoa
Izmir Province	Asar Castle		
Izmir Province	Ayasuluk Castle		Hellenistic Period
Izmir Province	Çandarlı Castle		Unknown
Izmir Province	Çeşme Castle		Ottoman Empire
Izmir Province	Foça Castle		Republic of Genoa
Izmir Province	Görece Castle		
Izmir Province	Kadifekale		Hellenistic Period
Izmir Province	Keçi Castle	38°01′28″N 27°25′20″E	
Izmir Province	Metropolis Castle		
Izmir Province	Nif Castle		
Izmir Province	Sancakburnu Castle	38°25′02″N 27°01′04″E	
Izmir Province	Sığacık Castle		Seljuks of Rum
Kahramanmaraş Province	Kahramanmaraş Castle		
Karaman Province	Karaman Castle		Byzantine Empire
Kars Province	Kars Castle		Bagratid Armenia; Ottoman Empire
Kastamonu Province	Kastamonu Castle		Byzantine Empire
Kayseri Province	Kayseri Castle		Byzantine Empire
Konya Province	Gevele Castle	37°54′6″N 32°23′11″E	Unknown
Konya Province	Ilgın Castle	38°18′40″N 32°3′2″E	Unknown
Konya Province	Beyşehir Castle		Eshrefids
Kütahya Province	Kütahya Castle		Byzantine Empire
Mardin Province	Mardin Castle		
Mersin Province	Çandır Castle		Byzantine Empire
Mersin Province	Belenkeşlik Castle		Byzantine Empire or Armenian Kingdom of Cilicia
Mersin Province	Dağlı Castle		Roman Empire
Mersin Province	Evciler Castle		Byzantine Empire or Armenian Kingdom of Cilicia
Mersin Province	Gözne Castle		Byzantine Empire
Mersin Province	Gülek Castle		Armenian Kingdom of Cilicia
Mersin Province	Hebilli Castle		Umayyads
Mersin Province	Hisarın Castle		Hellenistic Period (?)
Mersin Province	Casemate of İbrahim Pasha		Ottoman Empire
Mersin Province	Kara Castle		Byzantine Empire
Mersin Province	Kızlar Castle		Roman Empire
Mersin Province	Kızkalesi		Byzantine Empire; Armenian Kingdom of Cilicia
Mersin Province	Kuzucubelen Castle		Unknown
Mersin Province	Mamure Castle		Seljuks of Rum
Mersin Province	Mancınık Castle		Hellenistic Period
Mersin Province	Meydankale		Hellenistic Period
Mersin Province	Meydancık Castle		Pirandu (Luwians)
Mersin Province	Mut Castle		Byzantine Empire; Karamanids
Mersin Province	Namrun Castle		Armenian Kingdom of Cilicia
Mersin Province	Silifke Castle		Byzantine Empire
Mersin Province	Sinap Castle		Armenian Kingdom of Cilicia
Mersin Province	Softa Castle		Roman Empire
Mersin Province	Tece Castle		Byzantine Empire; Armenian Kingdom of Cilicia
Mersin Province	Tokmar Castle		Byzantine Empire
Mersin Province	Yaka Castle		Crusaders
Mersin Province	Yelbiz Castle		Byzantine Empire
Mersin Province	Yeniyurt Castle		Hellenistic Period; Byzantine Empire
Muğla Province	Bodrum Castle		Knights Hospitaller
Muğla Province	Marmaris Castle		Knights Hospitaller; Ottoman Empire
Nevşehir Province	Nevşehir Castle		Byzantine Empire
Nevşehir Province	Uçhisar Castle		
Niğde Province	Niğde Castle		Byzantine Empire
Niğde Province	Loulon		
Ordu Province	Bolaman Castle		
Ordu Province	Kevgürk Castle		
Ordu Province	Ünye Castle		Byzantine Empire; Empire of Trebizond
Osmaniye Province	Bodrumkale		
Osmaniye Province	Harun Reşit Castle		Abbasids
Osmaniye Province	Hemite Castle		Crusaders
Osmaniye Province	Toprakkale		Abbasids
Osmaniye Province	Servantikar		Armenian Kingdom of Cilicia
Rize Province	Kız Kulesi		
Rize Province	Rize Castle		Byzantine Empire
Rize Province	Zilkale		Byzantine Empire
Sinop Province	Boyabat Castle		Paphlagonia; Ottoman Empire
Sinop Province	Sinop Castle		Ancient Greeks; Kingdom of Pontus; Byzantine Empire
Sivas Province	Divriği Castle		Mengujekids
Şanlıurfa Province	Harran Castle		Byzantine Empire (?)
Şanlıurfa Province	Şanlıurfa Castle		Osroene
Şanlıurfa Province	Birecik Castle		
Şanlıurfa Province	Rumkale		Byzantine Empire
Şırnak Province	Cizre Castle		
Tokat Province	Tokat Castle		Byzantine Empire
Trabzon Province	Eskipazar Castle		Roman Empire
Trabzon Province	Çaykara Castle	40°44′42.1″N 40°15′23.4″E	Genoese (?)
Trabzon Province	Of Castle	40°56′06.1″N 40°14′45.4″E	Byzantine Empire
Trabzon Province	Trabzon Castle		Byzantine Empire
Tunceli Province	Pertek Castle		Seljuk Empire
Tunceli Province	Kaleköy		
Tunceli Province	Anbar Castle		
Tunceli Province	Sinan Castle		
Tunceli Province	Rabat Castle		
Tunceli Province	Şahverdi Castle		
Tunceli Province	Aşağı Doluca Castle		
Tunceli Province	Bağın Castle		
Tunceli Province	Mazgirt Castle		
Tunceli Province	Ayazpınar Castle		
Tunceli Province	Sağman Castle		Mengujekids
Tunceli Province	Çemişgezek Castle		
Van Province	Toprakkale		Urartu
Van Province	Van Castle		Urartu
Van Province	Hoşap Castle		
