= Dağlı =

Dağlı (literally "mountainous") may refer to:

- Dağlı, Erdemli, a village in Mersin Province, Turkey
- Dağlı, Quba, a village in Quba Rayon of Azerbaijan
- Dağlı, Zaqatala, formerly Əli Bayramlı, Azerbaijan

== Surname ==
- Vadilal Dagli, Gujarati poet & essayist
- Tamer Dağlı, Turkish politician
- Muhammed Emin Dağlı, Turkish-Canadian Businessman

== See also ==
- Dağlı Castle
