= Kızkalesi (disambiguation) =

Kızkalesi means "Maiden's castle" in Turkish and iy may refer to:

- Kızkalesi (ancient Corycus) a town in Erdemli district of Mersin Province
- Kızkalesi a castle built on a small islet and facing the town Kızkalesi

== See also ==
- Kızlar Kalesi
- Kızlar Monastery
- Kız Kulesi
