= Kahramanmaraş Liberation Museum =

Turkish museum of miniature figures

- Kahramanmaraş Kurtuluş Müzesi
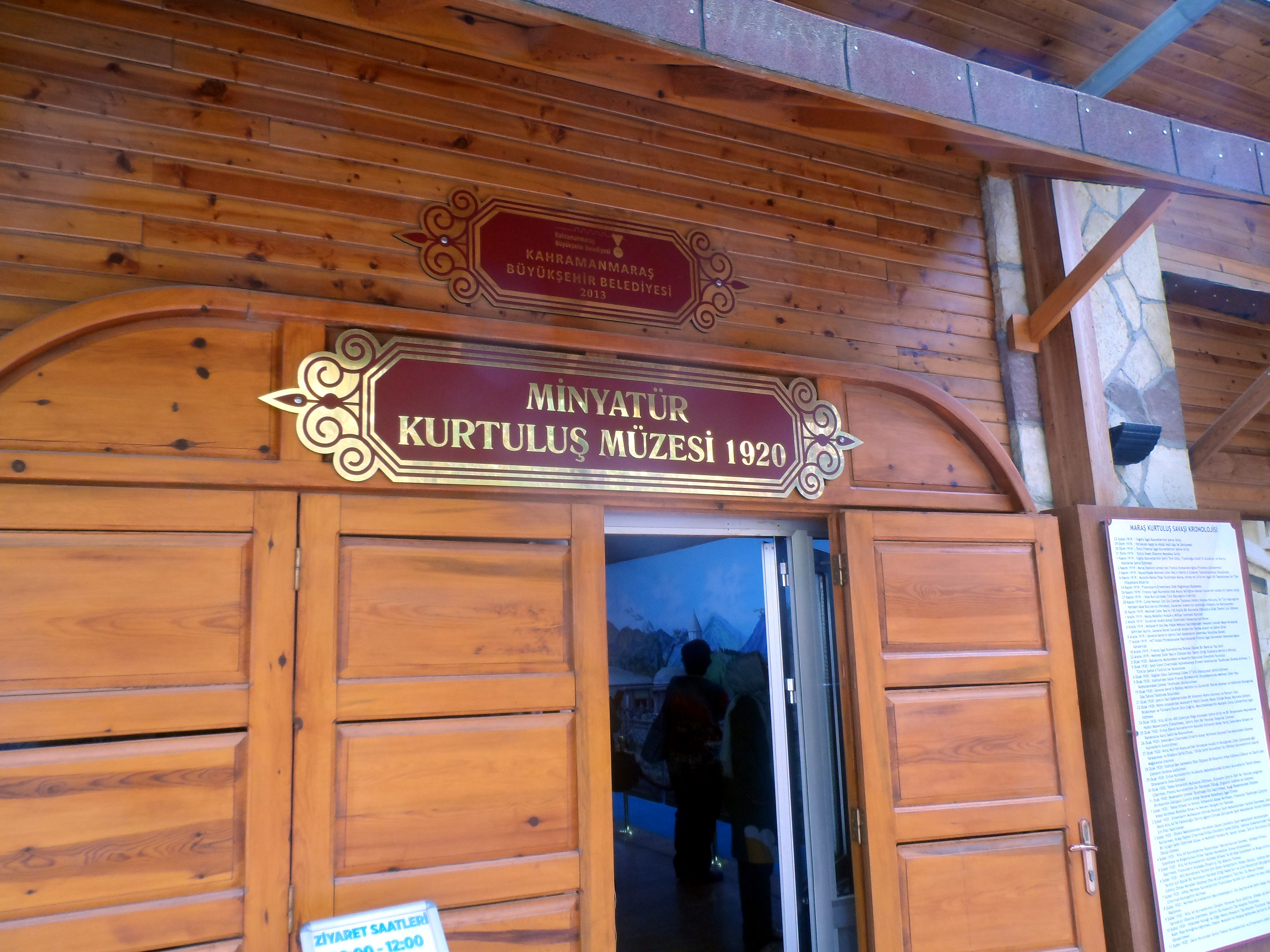
- Museum entrance

- Kahramanmaraş Liberation Museum
- Established: 2013; 13 years ago
- Coordinates: 37°35′12″N 36°55′33″E
- Type: Miniature figures
- Owner: Kahramanmaraş metropolitan Municipality

Kahramanmaraş Liberation Museum (Turkish: Kahramanmaraş Kurtuluş Müzesi) is a museum of miniature figures in Kahramanmaraş, Turkey.

== Location and the history ==
The museum is inside the Kahramanmaraş Castle at 37°35′12″N 36°55′33″E. It is a single-story building. It was built by the Metropolitan Municipality of Kahramanmaraş, and it was opened to service on 10 February 2013.

== The thema of the museum ==
Following the defeat of the Ottoman Empire in World War I, the Ottoman army was disarmed according to the Armistice of Mudros. Although the Ottoman Empire had agreed to give up vast territories, including what is now Syria and Iraq, the Allies further retained the power of controlling what was left of the Ottoman Empire, namely Turkey. On 22 February 1919, Kahramanmaraş was occupied by the British Army forces. However, the British side handed the city to the French Army on 29 October 1919. A part of the French troops consisted of French Foreign Legion, which was composed of local Armenians. On 31 October, a group of Armenian legion soldiers made a scene in front of a women's hamam (public bath), trying to tear the veil of a woman. Following the brawl between the legion soldiers and the Turks, several Turks and Armenians were killed. A milkman named Sütçü İmam is known as the first to fire. He is now considered one of the symbols of Kahramanmaraş resistance. On 26 November, the French commander hauled down the Ottoman flag, which was still flying over the castle, and this event incited a civil resistance. The resistance caused a 22-day fight between the French army and the Turkish nationalists (Turkish: Kuva-yi Milliye) from 21 January 1920 to 12 February 1920, which ended with the victory of the Turkish side.

== The exhibition ==
Although the theme of the museum is history, no historical artifact is displayed. The museum is actually an exhibition of miniature models of houses, people etc., which symbolize the liberation of Kahramanmaraş in 1919–1920.

The museum hall is square-formed and there are about ten successive scenes along the wall, each scene depicting another event in the episode. The first scene depicts the arrival of the British troops and the last scene shows celebration after the French troops withdrew.

== Museum scenes ==
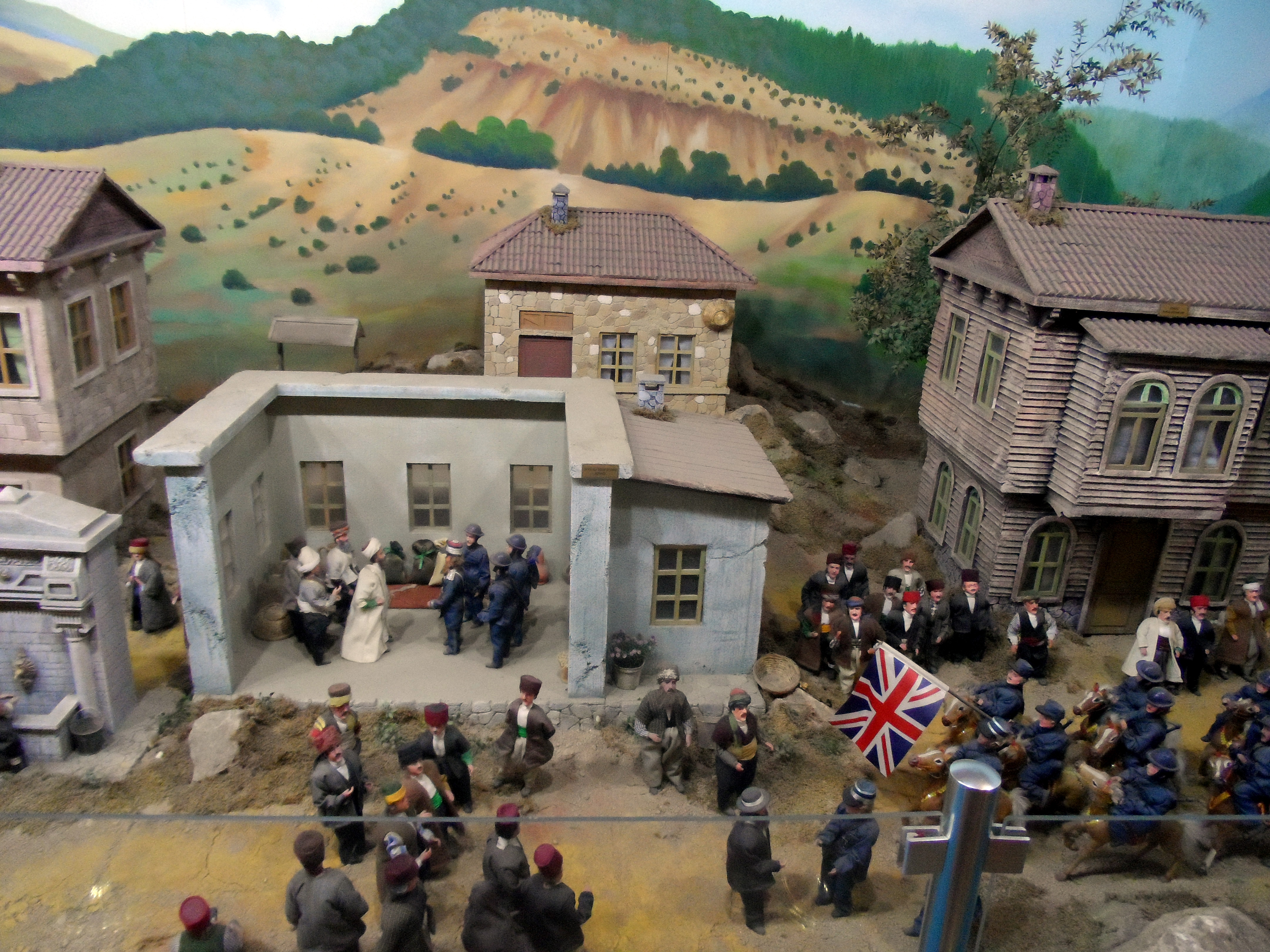
Arrival of the British troops

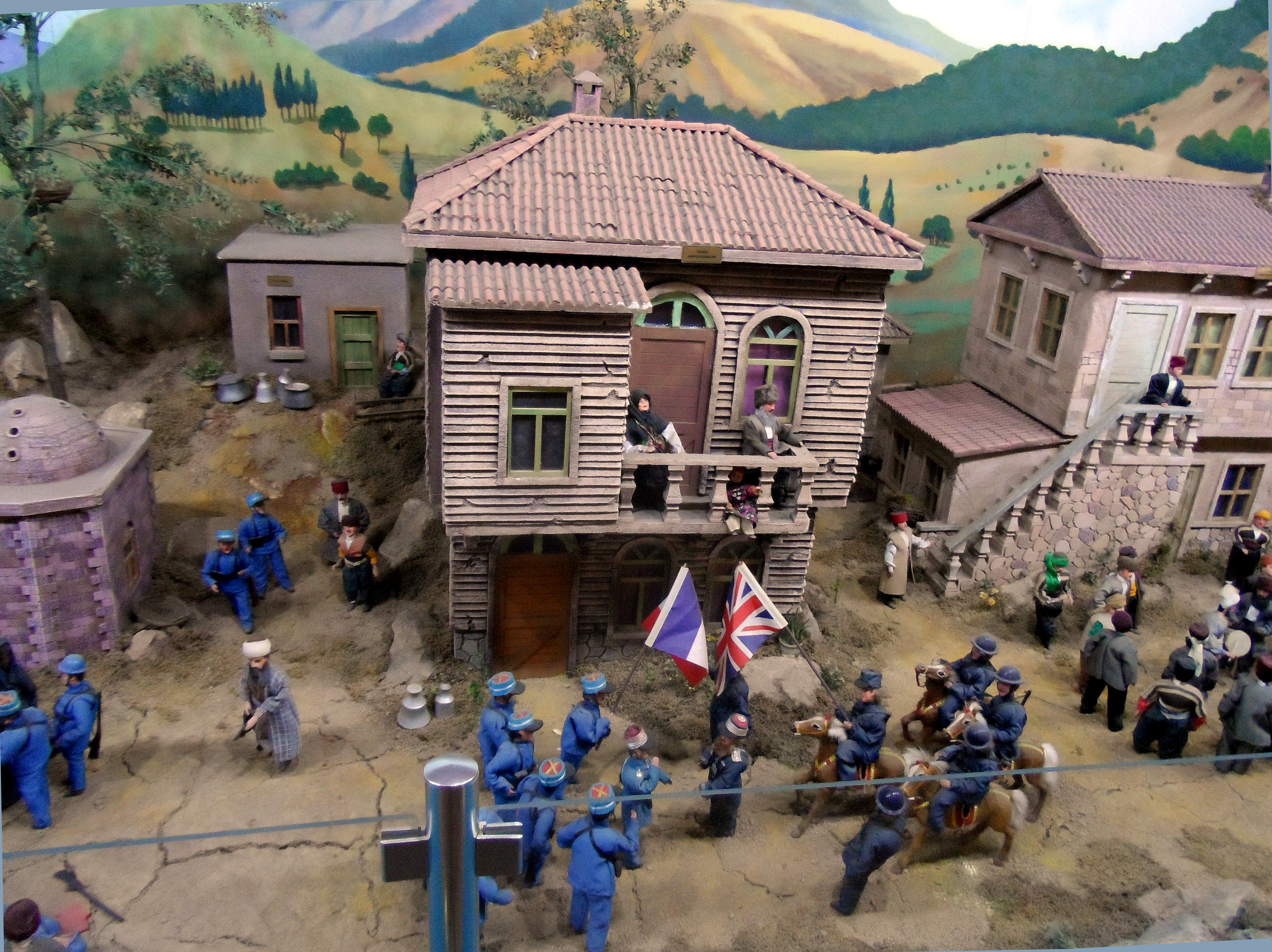
Arrival of the French troops

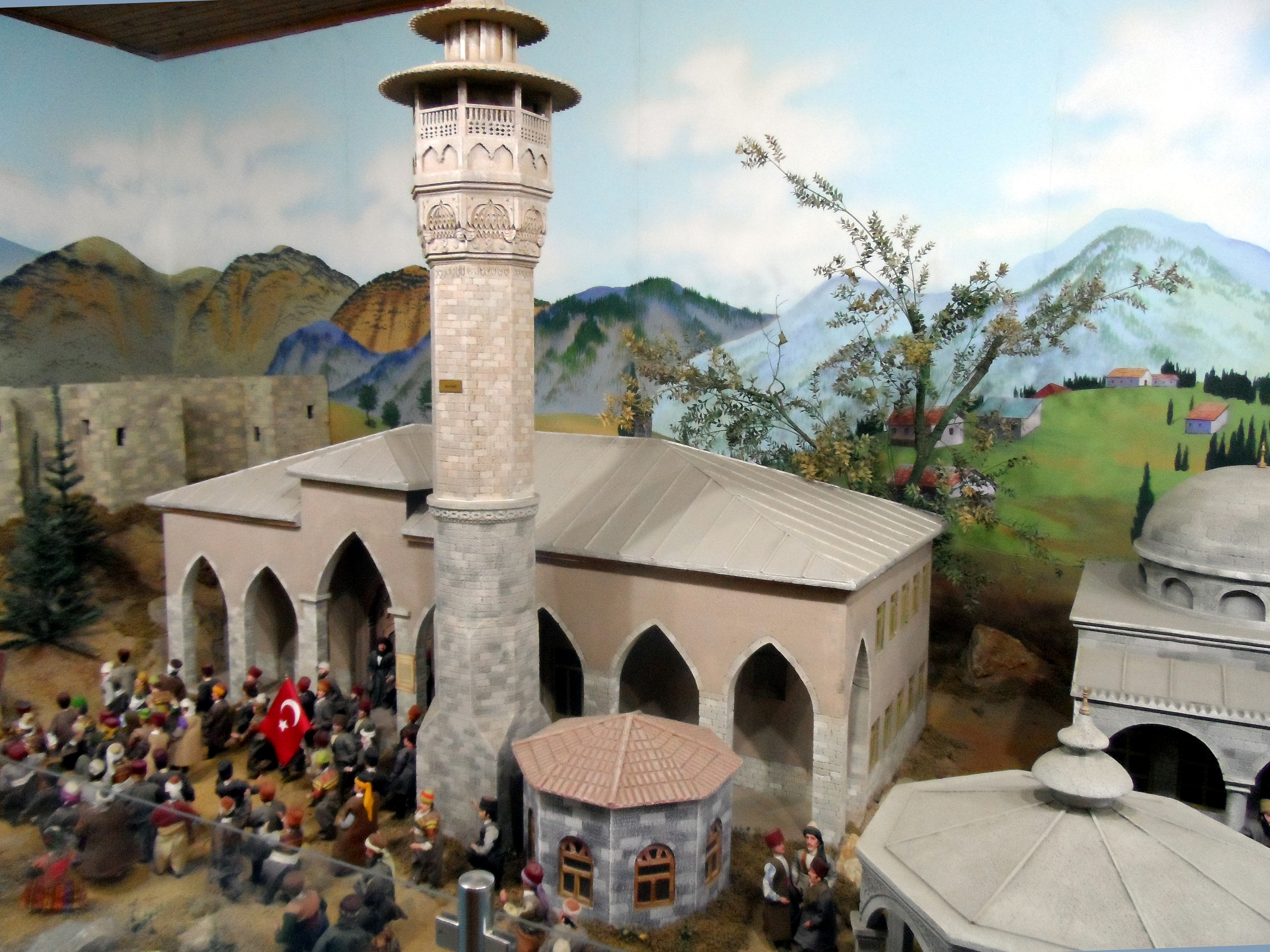
Meeting of the nationalists

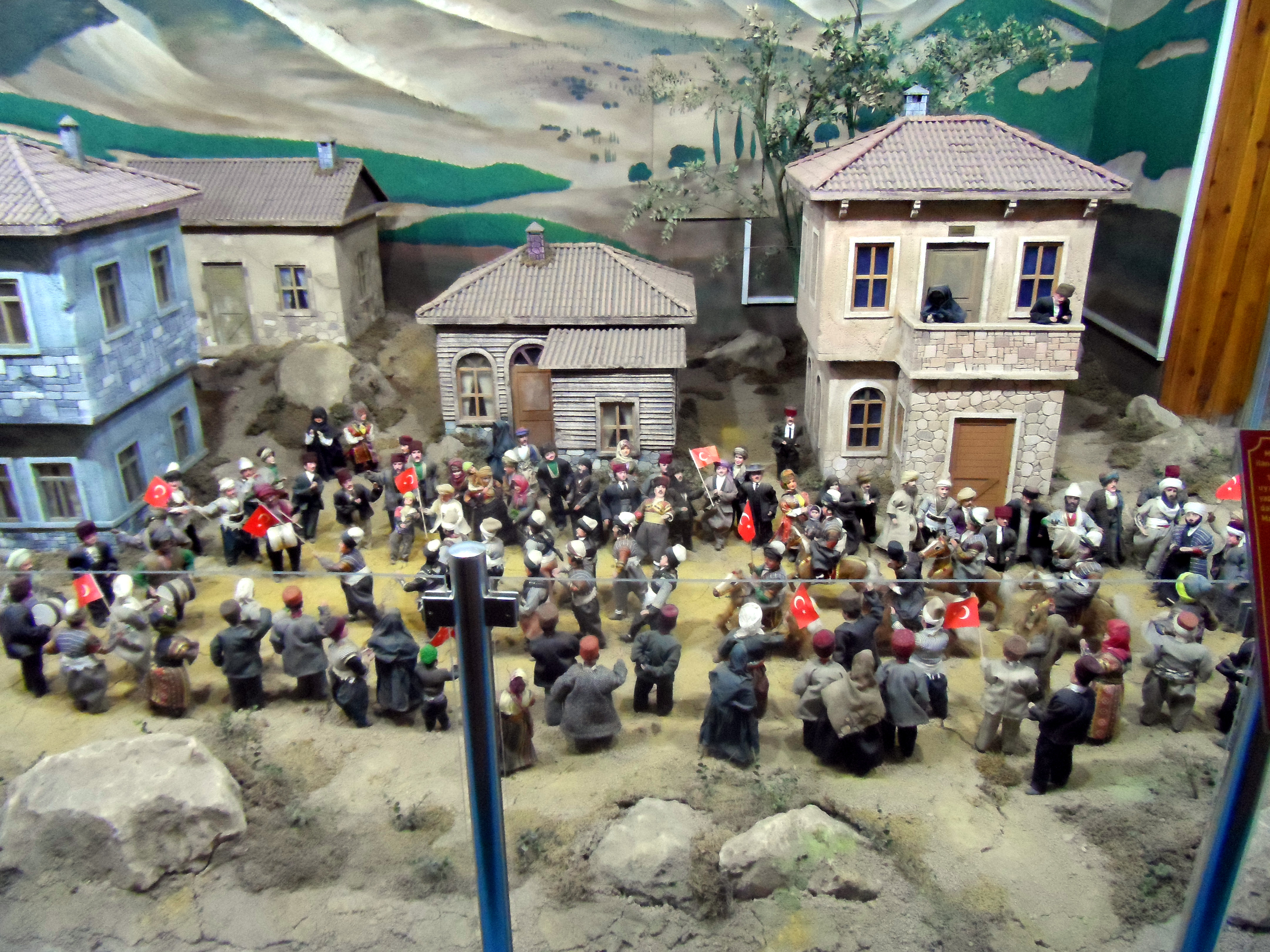
Celebrations after the victory
