= Kevgürk Castle =

Castle in Turkey

- Akkuş, Ordu Province

Location
- Height: 300 m

Site history
- Built by: Unknown

Kevgürk Castle (Turkish: Kevgürk Kalesi) is a castle in the Akkuş district of the Ordu Province in Turkey.

The castle is located 30 kilometers south of Akkuş, at a height of 300 m from the base next to the Tifi Creek, which is the continuation of Gökçebayır Creek. It is located on a steep cliff, and from a distance, can be mistaken for a part of the rock. There is a gate on the eastern side which is half-buried in the soil, the gate can be accessed by climbing the cliff on the eastern side. There are houses in the castle, made of brick and shards of marble. It has a dominant position that oversees its surroundings.
