= Kara Castle =

Castle ruin in Mersin Province, Turkey

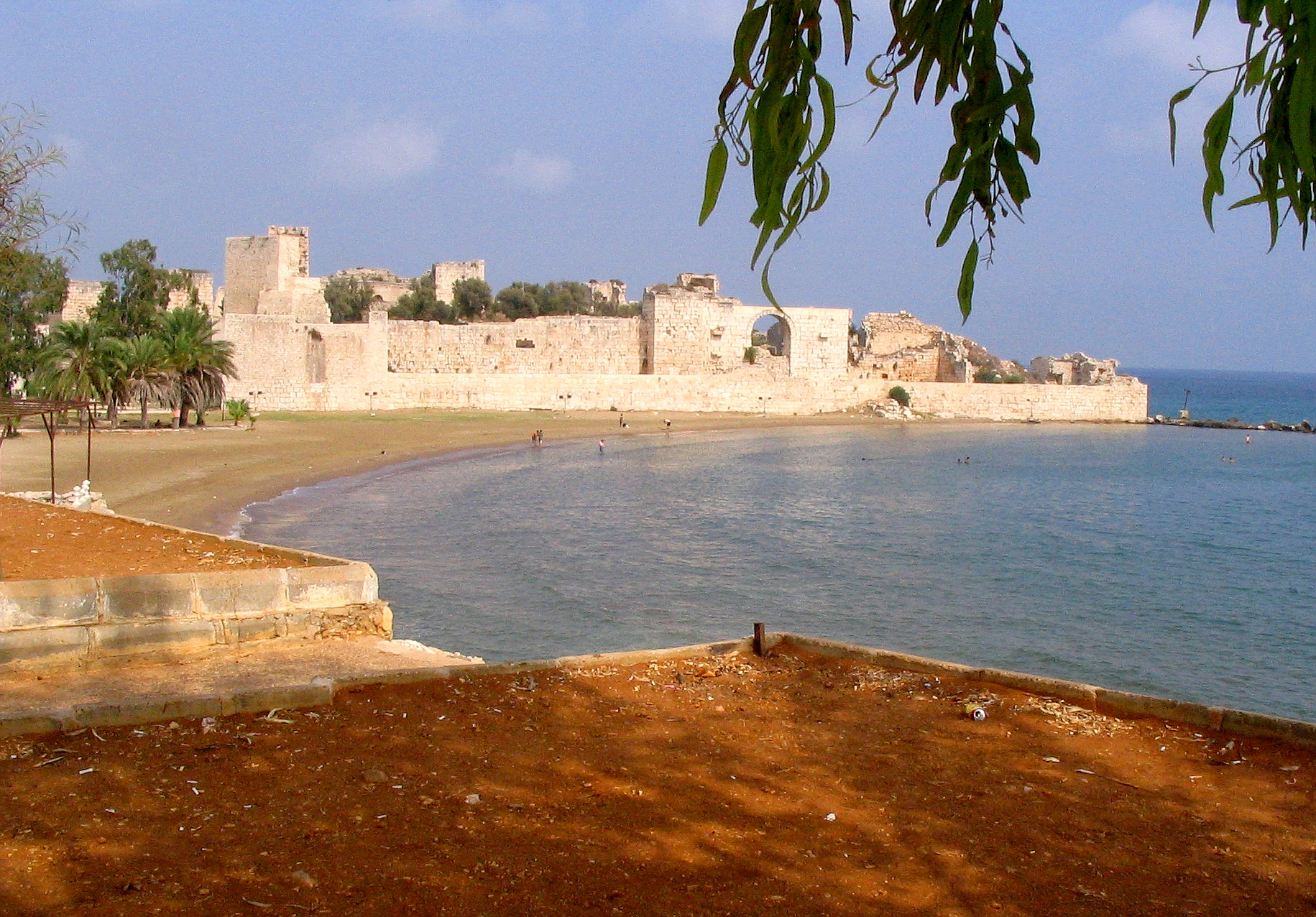
Kara Castle from the west

Kara Castle (Turkish: Kara Kalesi) is a castle ruin in Mersin Province, Turkey. Actually its name was Corycus Castle. The ancient town Corycus had two castles; one on the island facing the town and one on the land. So its customary to call the land castle Kara Castle (meaning ‘’land Castle’’ in Turkish).The castle is at 36°27′46″N 34°09′03″E. Its distance to Erdemli is 22 kilometres (14 mi) and to Mersin is 59 kilometres (37 mi).

== History ==
Kara Castle was built in the ancient ages. But it was rebuilt by the Byzantine Emperor Alexios I Komnenos in 1099 just after the First Crusade. Its architect was Megas Drungarios Eustatias. After the town became a part of the Armenian Kingdom of Cilicia, it was further enlarged. In 1191 Philip II of France visited the castle after the Third Crusade.

During the civil war in the Ottoman Empire between Bayazit I and Cem Sultan, the castle hosted Cem Sultan before Cem Sultan fled from the Ottoman Empire to Italy.

== The castle ==
Although there are additions during the Armenian Kingdom, spolia from the earlier cultures were used and the masonry is not typical of Armenians. The castle is protected by double bastions. The outer bastion was built later than the inner bastion. Within the castle there are three churches. There are also cisterns and a mausoleum in the castle. According to Unesco World Heritage page, during the wars and the pirate assault, a chain between the Kara Castle and the Kızkalesi Castle in the island was pulled up, preventing enemy ships from entering the port.
