= Island castle =

Water castle which is built upon an island

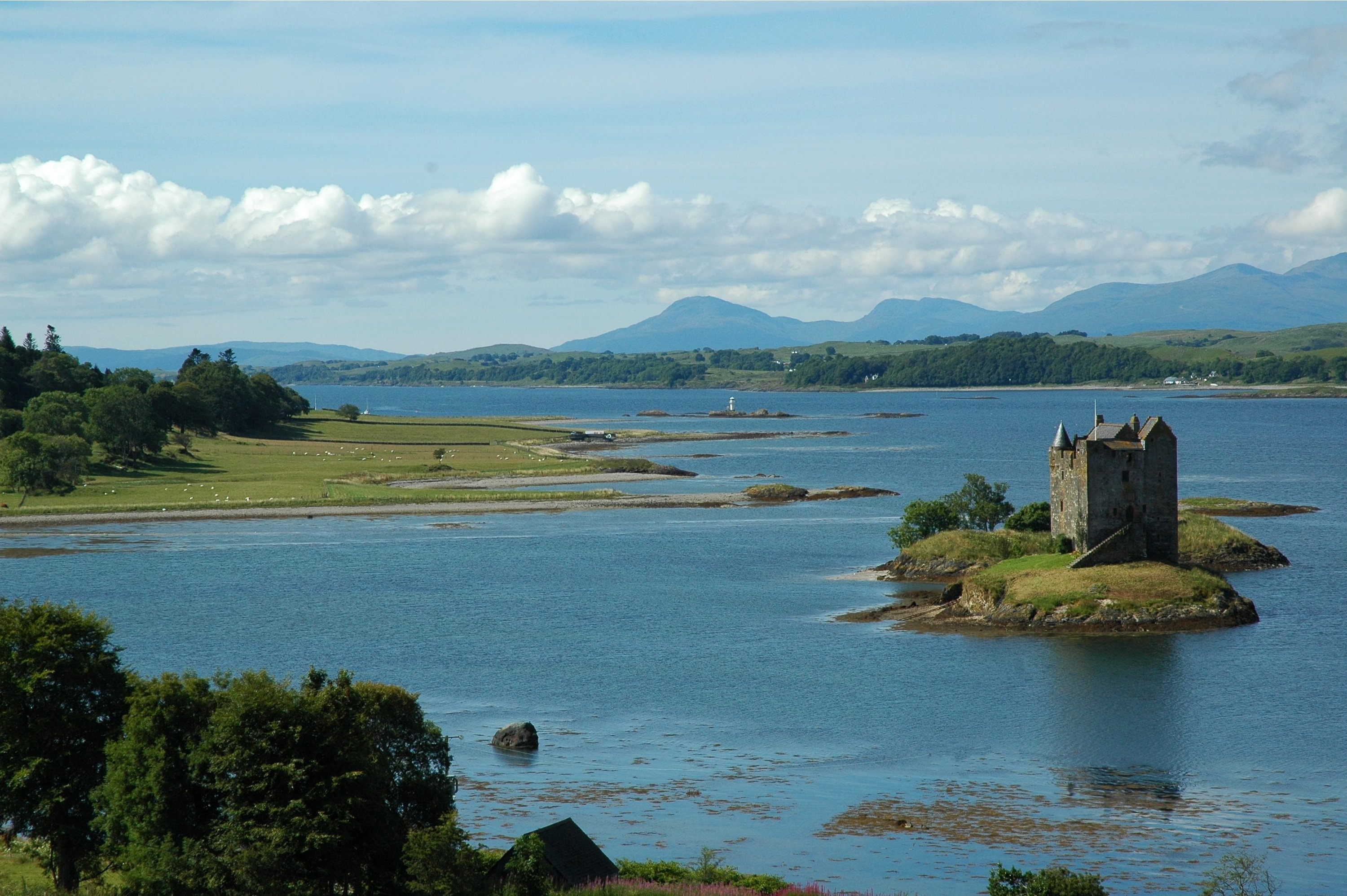
Castle Stalker, an island castle in Scotland

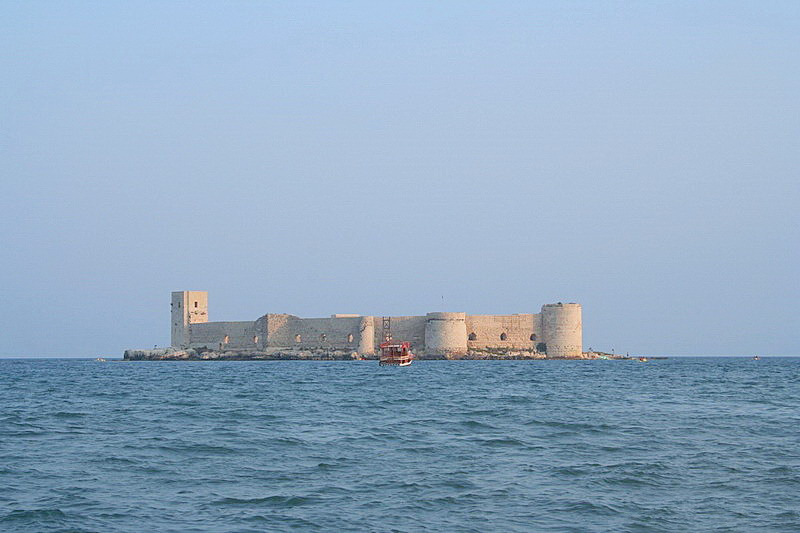
Kızkalesi, an island castle in Turkey

The island castle, or insular castle, is a variation of the water castle. It is distinguished by its location on an artificial or natural island. It is a typical lowland castle.

Because the island on which the castle was erected is separated from the shore by at least two bodies of water, artificial defences such as moats or shield walls were usually unnecessary if the castle was surrounded by flowing water. Such castles could therefore be very easily and cheaply built. Many island castles in lakes were, however, relatively easily captured in winter if there was an ice sheet thick enough to support attacking troops, because they were often rather poorly fortified.

== European island castles ==
- The best-known island castle in Germany is Pfalzgrafenstein Castle near Kaub, Rhineland-Palatinate.
- The Château d'If is situated on the southern coast of France.
- The English counterpart to Mont-Saint-Michel in Normandy is St Michael's Mount in Cornwall.
- Piel Castle was built on Piel Island of the coast of the Furness peninsula in England.
- Switzerland's iconic Chillon Castle sits on a small island in the eastern end of Lake Geneva.
- The Aragonese Castle is situated in the Gulf of Naples.
- The only water castle in Europe that utilizes Gothic architecture is Trakai Castle in Lithuania.
- Bohus Fortress on Fästningholmen in Kungälv, Sweden.

Mont-Saint-Michel is not, as many people believe, a castle; it is a fortified monastery.

== Island castles in South Asia ==
Though not entirely a castle, really consisting of a fort surrounding a palace, Murud-Janjira is a famous island fortress off the Indian coast in the Arabian Sea. The fortress is relatively unique in that the outermost defensive walls of the compound entirely encompass the island's natural land, thwarting any attacks using traditional amphibious landings.

== See also ==
- Crannog, a type of fortified artificial island

== Sources ==
- Taylor, James (1889). The Great Historic Families of Scotland. Vol. 1. London: Virtue.
- Turnbull, Stephen (2003). Crusader Castles of the Teutonic Knights. Vol. 1: The Red-brick Castles of Prussia (1230-1466). Oxford: Osprey. ISBN 1-84176-557-0.
