= Bayburt Castle =

Castle in Bayburt, Turkey

Castle of Bayburt
- Bayburt, Turkey in Turkey
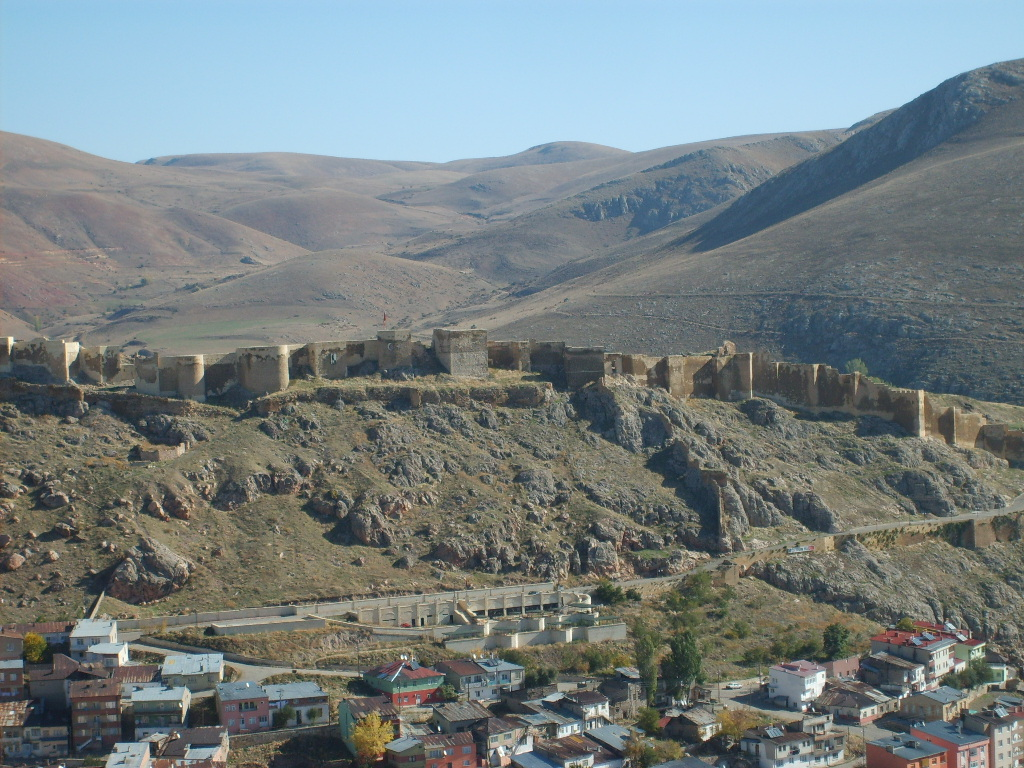
- Bayburt Castle

Site information
- Type: Castle

Location
- Coordinates: 40.26342°N 40.22979°E

Bayburt Castle (Turkish: Bayburt Kalesi) is a historic castle on a hill overlooking Bayburt, Turkey.

== Location ==
Located on the bank of Çoruh River in its upper basin at Black Sea Region, northeastern Turkey, the castle was built on a peninsula-like steep rocky hill in the north of Bayburt, overlooking the city, which is at an elevation 1,150 m (3,770 ft) AMSL.

== History ==
It is not known when and by whom the castle was built. It was fortified during the reign of Byzantine Emporer Justinian I (r. 527–565). The castle was taken over by Great Seljuks in 1054-1055, when Bayburt and its surroundings were captured as one of the first areas conquered and settled by the Turks in Anatolia, and by the Saltukids after the Siege of Manzikert (1054). It remained in the hands of the Danishmendids for a while. It is understood from the inscriptions that the castle was repaired in this period in the most comprehensive way by the Seljuks. Accordingly, Seljuk sultan Tughril II (r. 1132–1134) and the ruler of Erzurum, virtually rebuilt this castle, which was a fortified position against attacks especially from the Empire of Trebizond. The castle, which remained in the hands of the Akkoyunlular for a while, was transferred to the Ottomans in 1514. Bayburt Castle underwent a major restoration in 1541 by Suleiman the Magnificent (r. 1520–1566) when its importance increased during his Iran campaign. A later repair took place by Murad III (r. 1574–1595). A record from 1520 states that there were 397 guards and a large amount of cannons, rifles and war materials in the castle, which was an important fortified place for the protection of Bayburt and this road on the Trabzon-Iran transit route for centuries.

The castle and its settlement inside the citadel, which were occupied and destroyed from time to time, and after largely destroyed by the Russians during the Russo-Turkish War (1828–1829), were left to their own devices until the 1980s. Some parts of the castle that were in danger of complete collapse were repaired after this date while the structures inside the citadel were not revived.

== Architecture ==
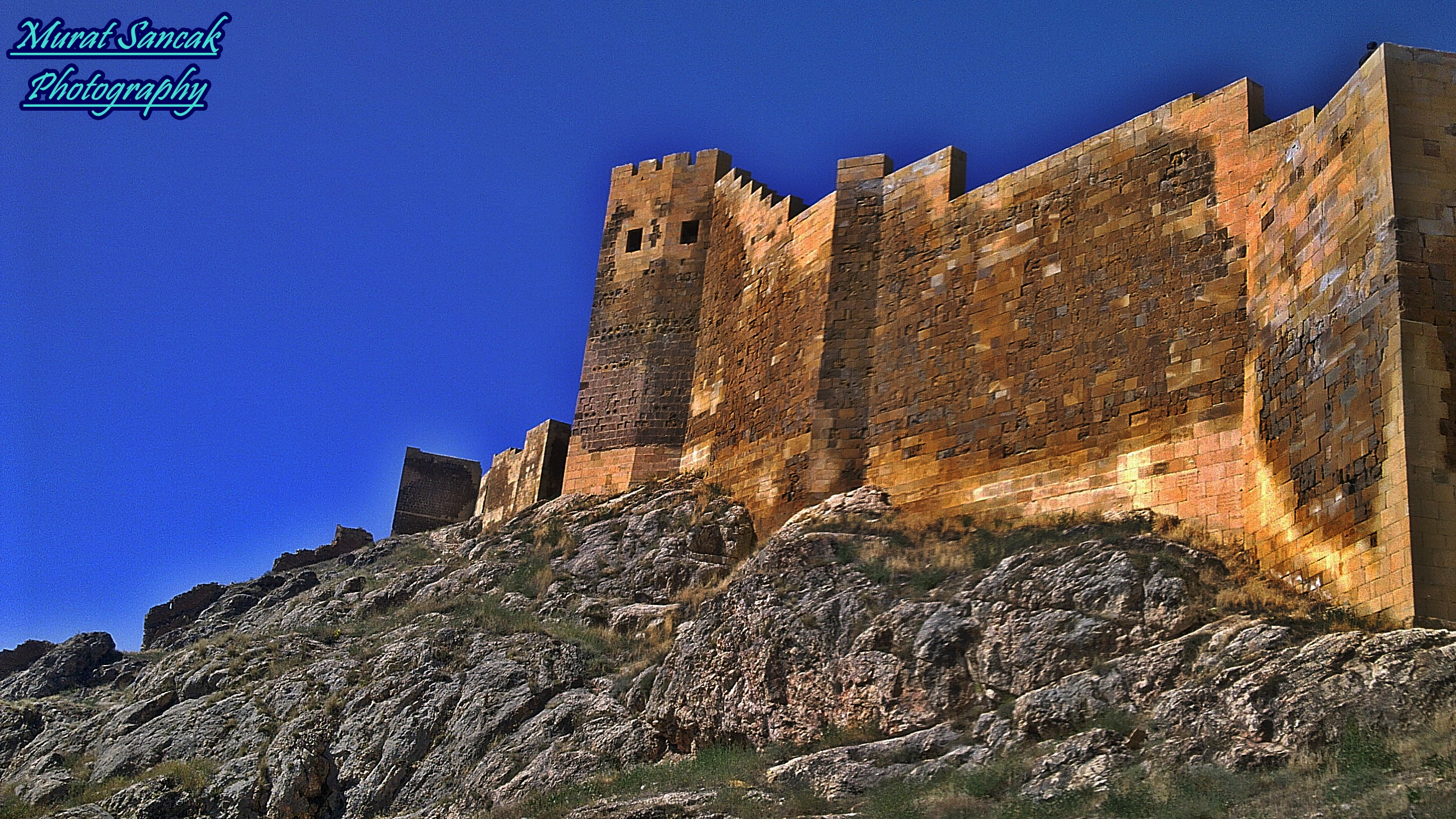
Outer walls of Bayburt Castle

The castle is surrounded by two wall layers of five or six facades being more than 2 km (1.2 mi) long and up to 30 m (98 ft 5 in) high since there is no defensive moat. The distance between the inner and outer walls is 200 m (660 ft). There are semicircular, quadrangular and triangular bastions at the corners and various places of these walls, which are reinforced with retaining walls. The outer walls were built on steep rocks, giving the castle a majestic view. Evliya Çelebi (1611–1682), who visited Bayburt in 1647, writes in his travelbook Seyahatnâme that there was a neighborhood of 300 houses and a mosque within the castle's citadel. According to him, the castle has two large gates in the east and west. The eastern one, made of three layers of iron, was called "Demirkapı" (literally: "Irongate"), and the other one was called "Nöbethane Kapısı" (literally: "Watch Station Gate" leading to the city.

As understood from the inscriptions, the castle was repaired and reinforced by the army commander, palace servant of Tughril II and architect Ziyâeddin Lü'lü, who constructed also some bastions. The single-line inscription of the bastion built by Hatice Sultan, wife of Tughril II, on the side of the walls facing the city, written in Naskh script, existed until 1936, but is now lost.
