= Belenkeşlik Castle =

Castle in Mersin Province, Turkey

Coordinates: 36°58′20″N 34°33′12″E

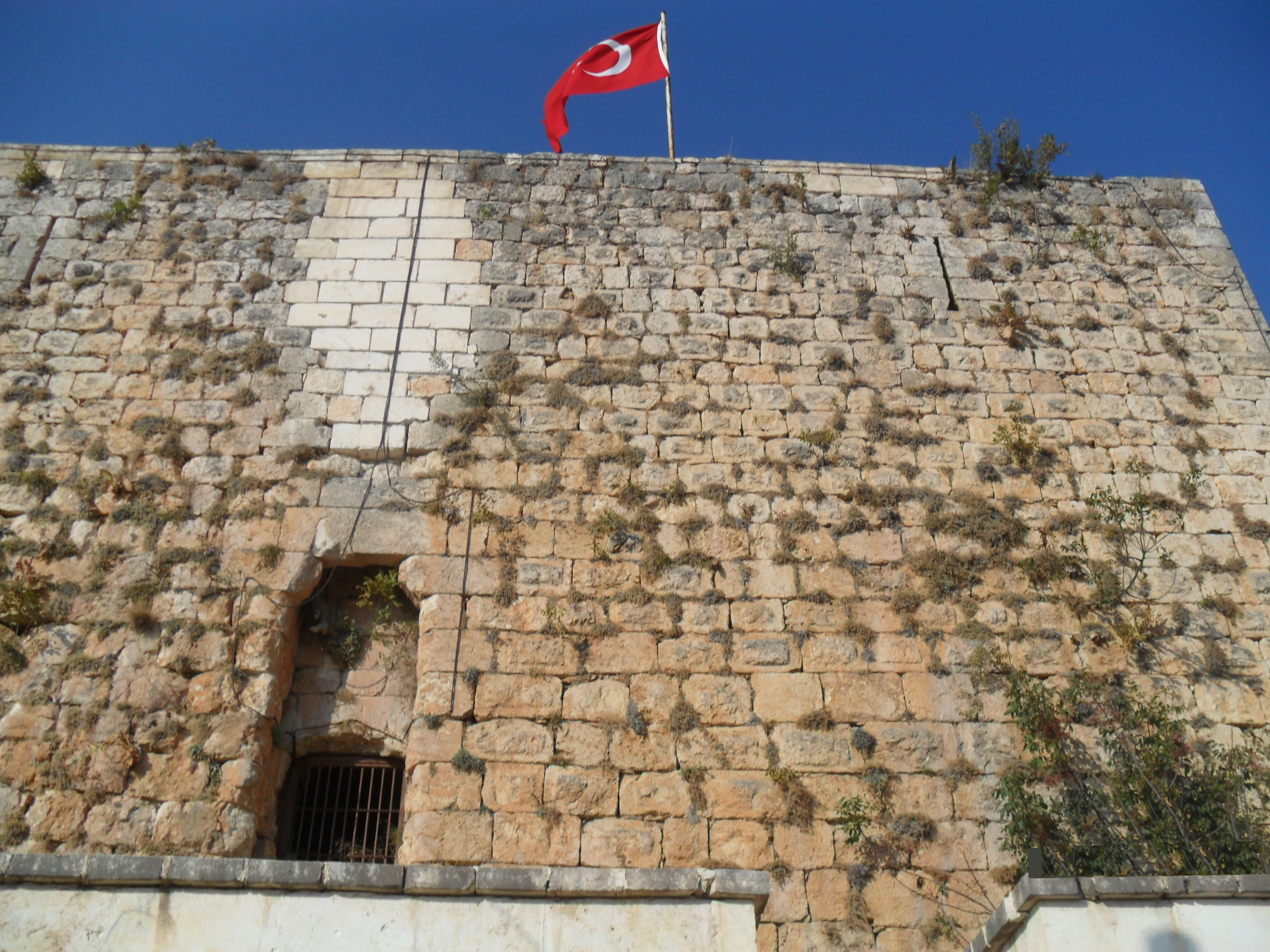
Belenkeşlik Castle

Belenkeşlik Castle is a medieval castle in Mersin Province, Turkey. It is situated to the north of Soğucak belde (town) of Mersin. Its distance to Mersin centreum is about 20 kilometres (12 mi).

The exact construction date of the castle is not known. But it was probably a late Byzantine or an Armenian building. Belenkeşlik Castle was one of the smaller fortifications used to control the roads. It is a rectangular plan castle. Although presently it is a two-storey building, judging from the consoles, probably there was also a third floor in the past. The building material is face stone.
