= Ardahan Castle =

Coordinates: 41.1177°N 42.7032°E

- Ardahan Kalesi
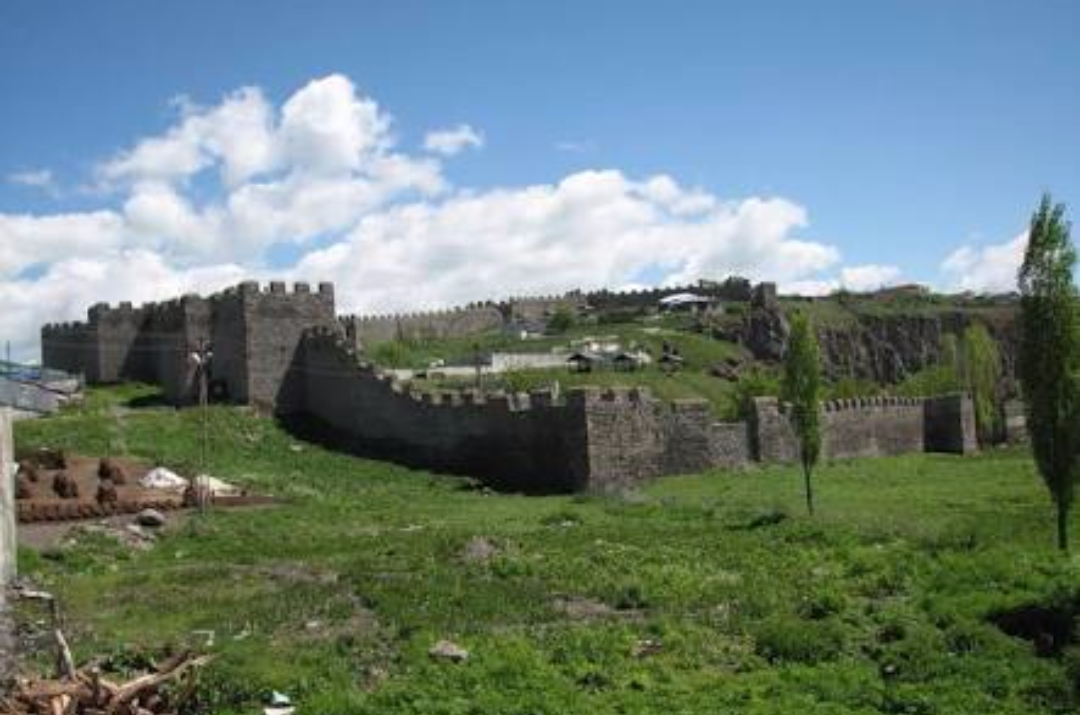

General information
- Town or city: Çıldır, Ardahan
- Country: Turkey

Ardahan Castle is a castle is located just across the Kura river in Ardahan, Turkey. The castle is a popular destination inside of the Ardahan province. It is supported by many towers. Ardahan Castle has a park inside. There are inscriptions written in Ottoman and Georgian language in the castle.

It was not possible to freely enter Ardahan Castle because it was used by the military, but at present time, the castle is freely accessible by anyone.

== History ==
The exact construction date of the Ardahan Castle is unknown. The first castle here was built during the 12th century under Seljuk rule, then was renovated in the 16th century with the order of Suleiman I. The castle was frequently used by the Ottomans.
