= Dağlı, Erdemli =

Dağlı
- Neighbourhood
- Location in Turkey
- Coordinates: 36°42′35″N 34°15′40″E
- Country: Turkey
- Province: Mersin
- District: Erdemli
- Elevation: 510 m (1,670 ft)
- Population (2022): 824
- Time zone: UTC+3 (TRT)
- Postal code: 33730
- Area code: 0324

Dağlı is a neighbourhood in the municipality and district of Erdemli, Mersin Province, Turkey. Its population is 824 (2022). It is situated in the forests of the Taurus Mountains. Its distance to Erdemli is 19 kilometres (12 mi) and to Mersin is 29 kilometres (18 mi).

The village is known for the ruins of the ancient Dağlı Castle (Turkish: Dağlı kalesi) which require restoration. There is also an ancient public fountain. The main economic activity of the village is fruit farming. Citrus and tomato are the main crops, but recently, olive has been replacing the traditional crops.
