= Mancınık Castle =

Castle in Silifke, Mersin, Turkey

- Mersin Province, Turkey
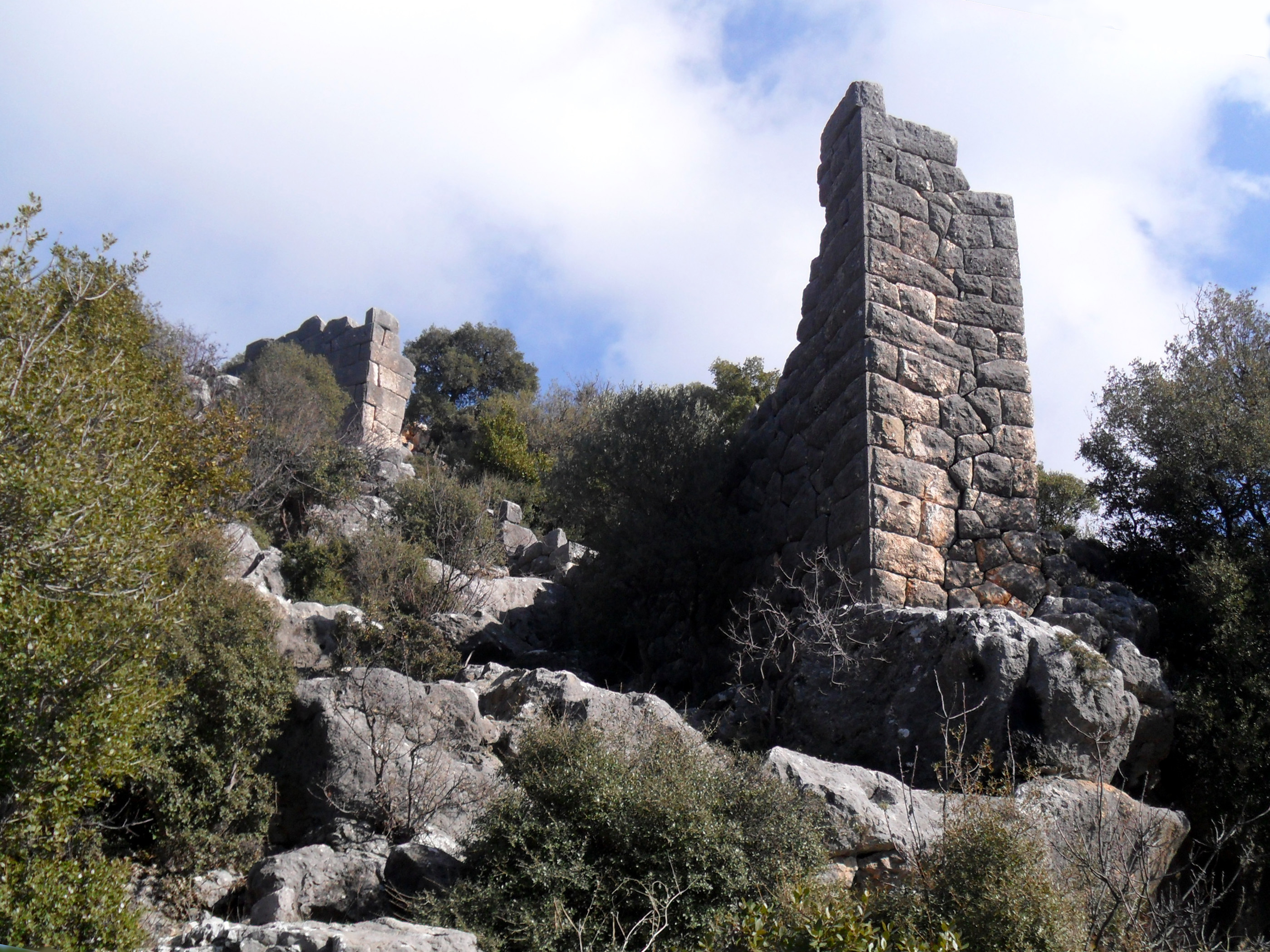

Site information
- Type: Fortress
- Open to the public: Yes
- Condition: Partially standing.

Location
- Coordinates: 36°31′N 34°04′E

Site history
- Built by: Hellenistic age
- Demolished: Most of it

Mancınık Castle (Turkish: Mancınık Kale) is a Hellenistic castle ruin in Mersin Province, Turkey. Its original name is unknown.

== Geography ==
The castle is situated in Silifke district of Mersin Province, at 36°31′N 34°03′E, about 10 kilometres (6.2 mi) bird's flight to Mediterranean Sea. Visitors to the site follow the road from Narlıkuyu and Cennet to north . The last 500 metres (1,600 ft) of the course which detaches from the road to east is actually a rough path. The castle is situated on the clift which overviews the Şeytanderesi canyon to the east. Adamkayalar (which is historically unrelated to the castle) is situated 7 km southeast in the east wall of the canyon.

== History ==
The first archaeological research of the site has been carried out by Levent Zoroğlu in 1987. The walls are made of polygonal shaped stones, a characteristics of Hellenistic architecture. Also there are few inscriptions. Although these are mostly erased a few words could be read. Hellenistic origin is also confirmed by a decrypted word oikodomos.
