= Yelbiz Castle =

Historic ruin in Mersin Province, Turkey

- Yelbiz Kalesi
- Tekedüz village, Bozyazı, Mersin Province, Turkey

Site information
- Type: Fortress
- Open to the public: Yes
- Condition: Mostly demolished

Location
- Coordinates: 36°08′41″N 33°00′50″E

Site history
- Built by: Byzantine Empire (?)
- Materials: Stone

Yelbiz Castle (Turkish: Yelbiz Kalesi, literally "Spider Castle") is a castle ruin in Mersin Province, Turkey.

The castle is in Bozyazı ilçe (district) of Mersin Province at about 36°08′41″N 33°00′50″E. It is situated on a 600 m (2,000 ft) hill to the north east of Bozyazı. Visitors follow the road from Tekedüzü village to west in the dense forestry. There is no road in the last 350 m (1,150 ft) of the course. Its distance to Bozyazı is 8 km (5.0 mi) and to Mersin is 207 km (129 mi).

Within the castle, which is mostly in ruins, there is a monastery with two wide halls, a part of a basilica and a courtyard. There are remains of mosaics with geometric design in the monastery. The windows are round arch type. There are two cisterns and two towers of about 6–7 m (20–23 ft) height in the west of the castle.
