= Sinap Castle =

Castle in present-day Turkey

- Çamlıyayla, Mersin Province, Turkey
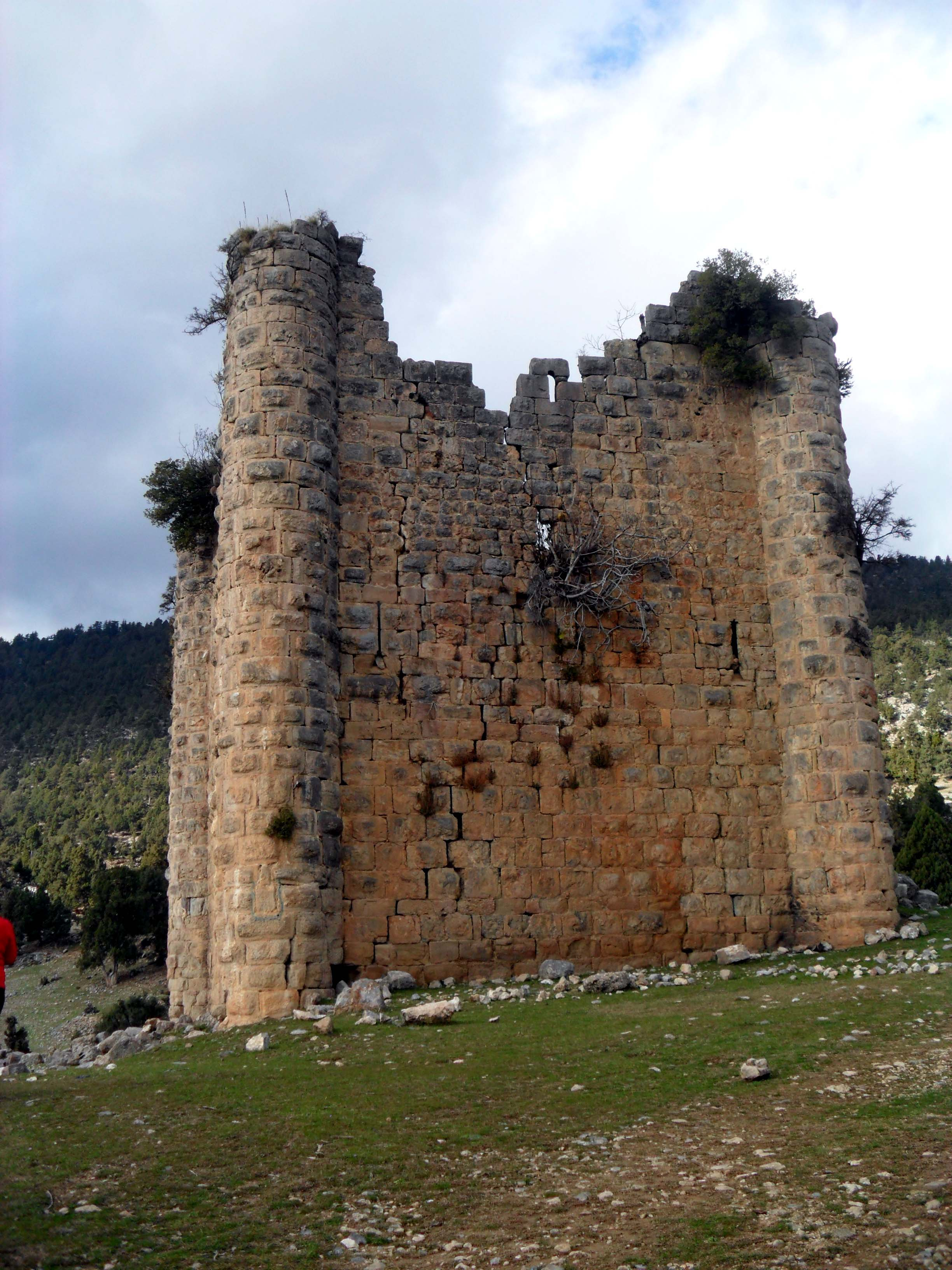

Site information
- Type: Fortress
- Open to the public: Yes
- Condition: Outer walls still standing.

Location
- Coordinates: 37°11′21″N 34°36′42″E
- Height: 1,240 m (4,070 ft)

Site history
- Materials: stone
- Demolished: Interior

Sinap Castle is a medieval Armenian fortification in Çamlıyayla ilçe (district) of Mersin Province in southern Turkey.

== Geography ==
The castle is in the Toros Mountains at 37°11′21″N 34°36′42″E. It is situated to the northeast of Çamlıyayla and to the north of Mersin. The distance to Çamlıyayla is 5 km (3.1 mi) and to Mersin is 93 km (58 mi). The 2 km (1.2 mi) stabilized road to the castle diverges from the Mersin-Çamlıyayla highway. Its altitude is 1,240 m (4,070 ft). But it is not particularly high with respect to immediate surroundings.

== History ==
The castle functioned as both a fortified estate house and a guardian along the strategic route between the Het‛umid castle at Lampron (Namrun Kalesi) and the Cilician Gates. It was one of the many dozens of fortifications within the medieval Armenian Kingdom of Cilicia. The fort of Sinap is located approximately six kilometers northeast of Lampron on the gentle slope of a partially forested agricultural valley. The name Sinap means "corner" in old Turkish.

== Building ==
This three-story high structure has a simple rectangular plan with solid cylindrical towers at each corner. It was built between the 12th and 14th centuries with the typical rusticated ashlar masonry of the Armenians. The lower floor, which is covered by a partially collapsed pointed vault, has no openings except for one door in the west wall. A now missing staircase once led to the second level which also has a partially preserved vault. Its walls are opened by nine beautifully designed casemates with embrasured loopholes, two windows, and an apse (?) in the east wall. The third level, which undoubtedly had fighting platforms (perhaps with merlons), is destroyed. The fortification was surveyed in 1979.

== Gallery ==
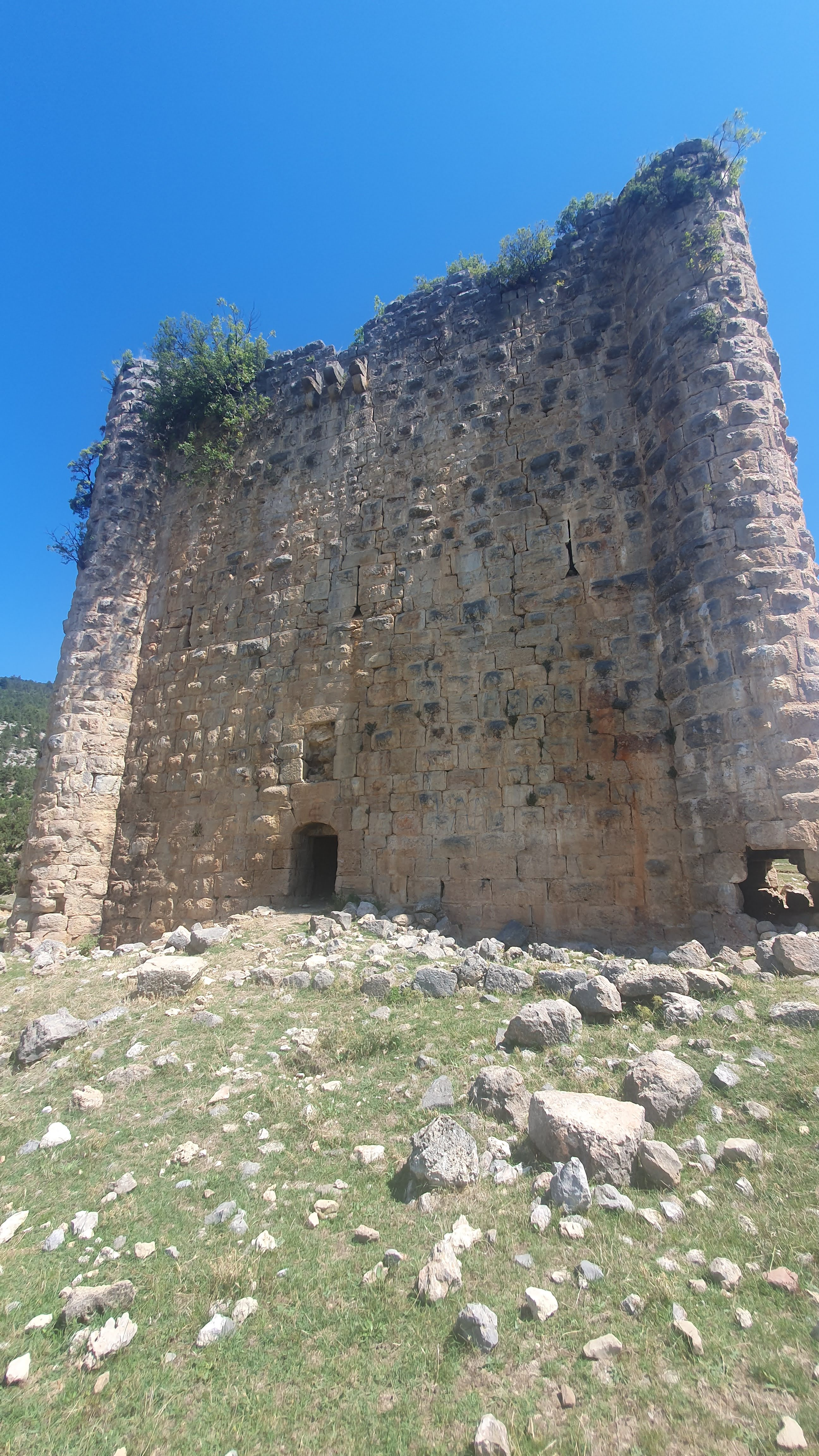
Sinap Castle, southwest facade and entrance

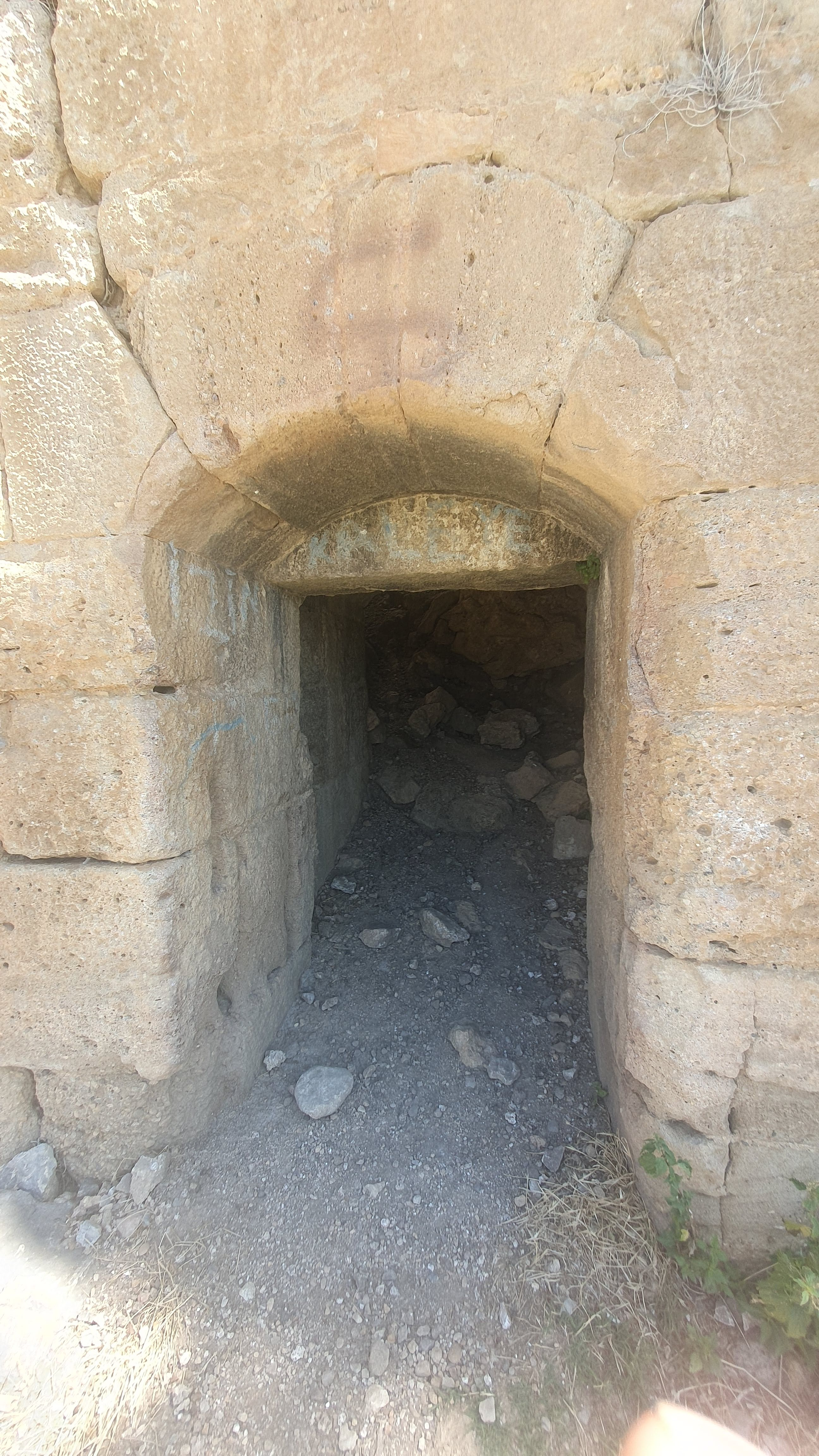
Sinap Castle, detail of the entrance gate in the southwest direction

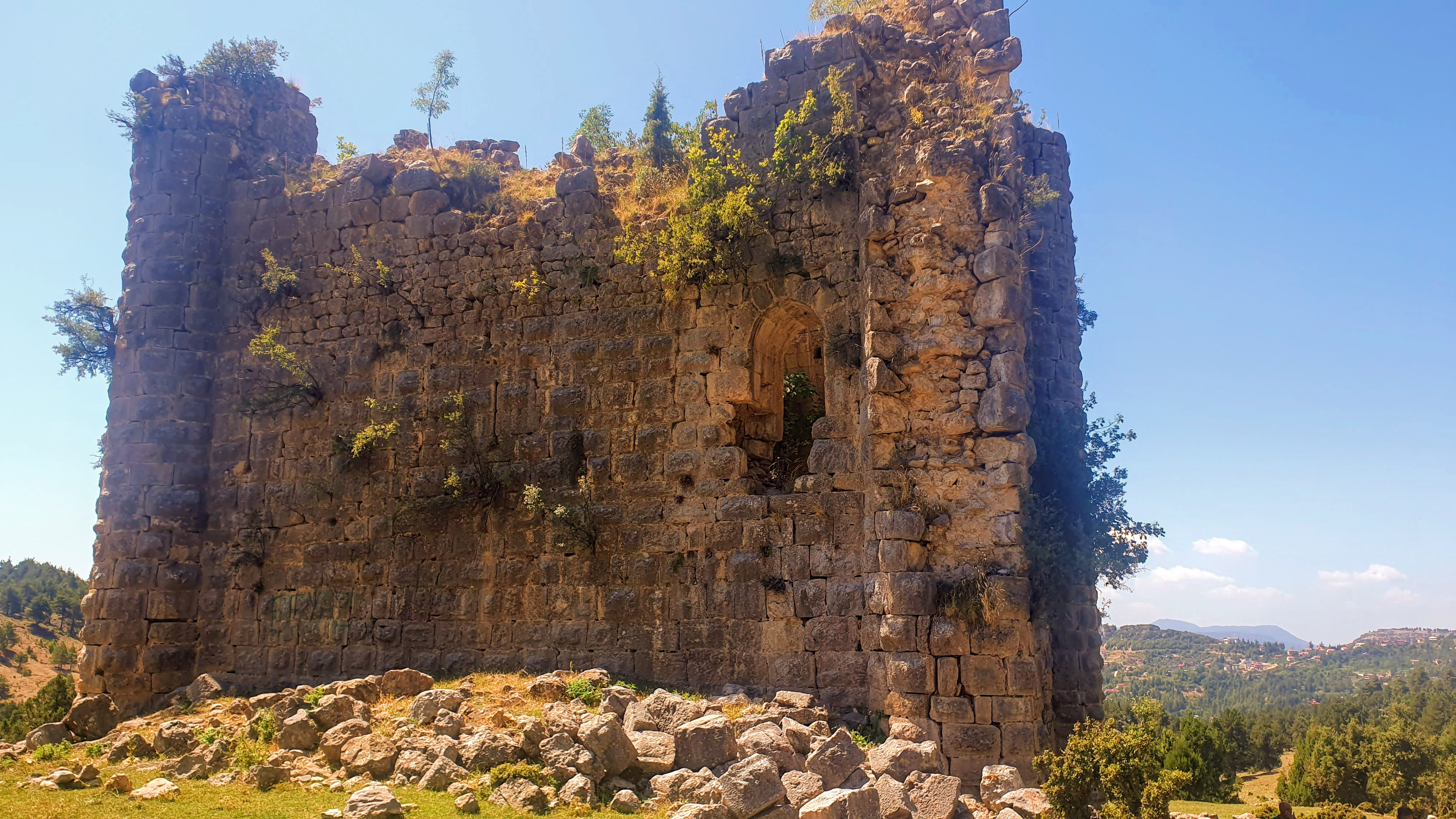
Sinap Castle, Northeast facade

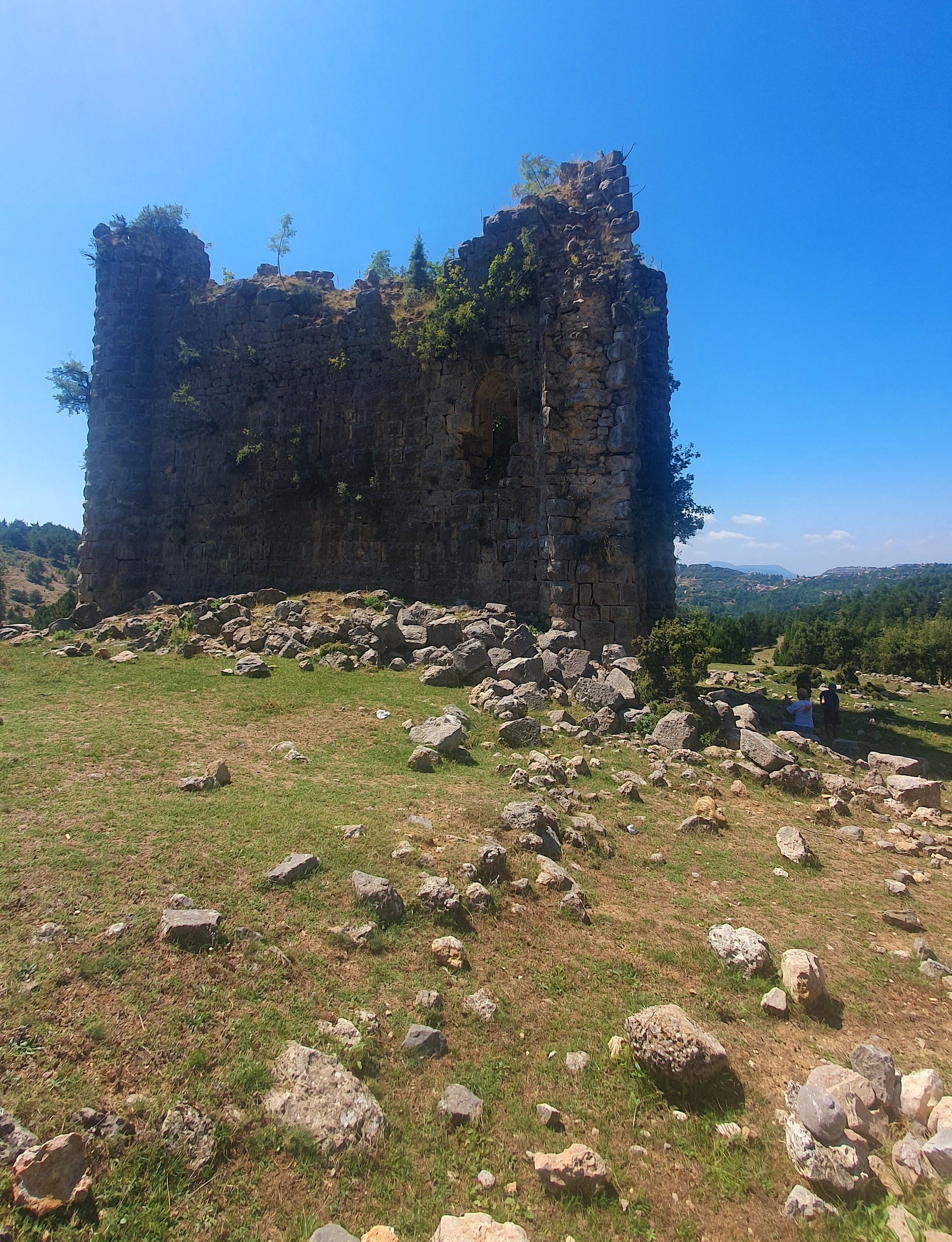
Sinap Castle, Northeast facade

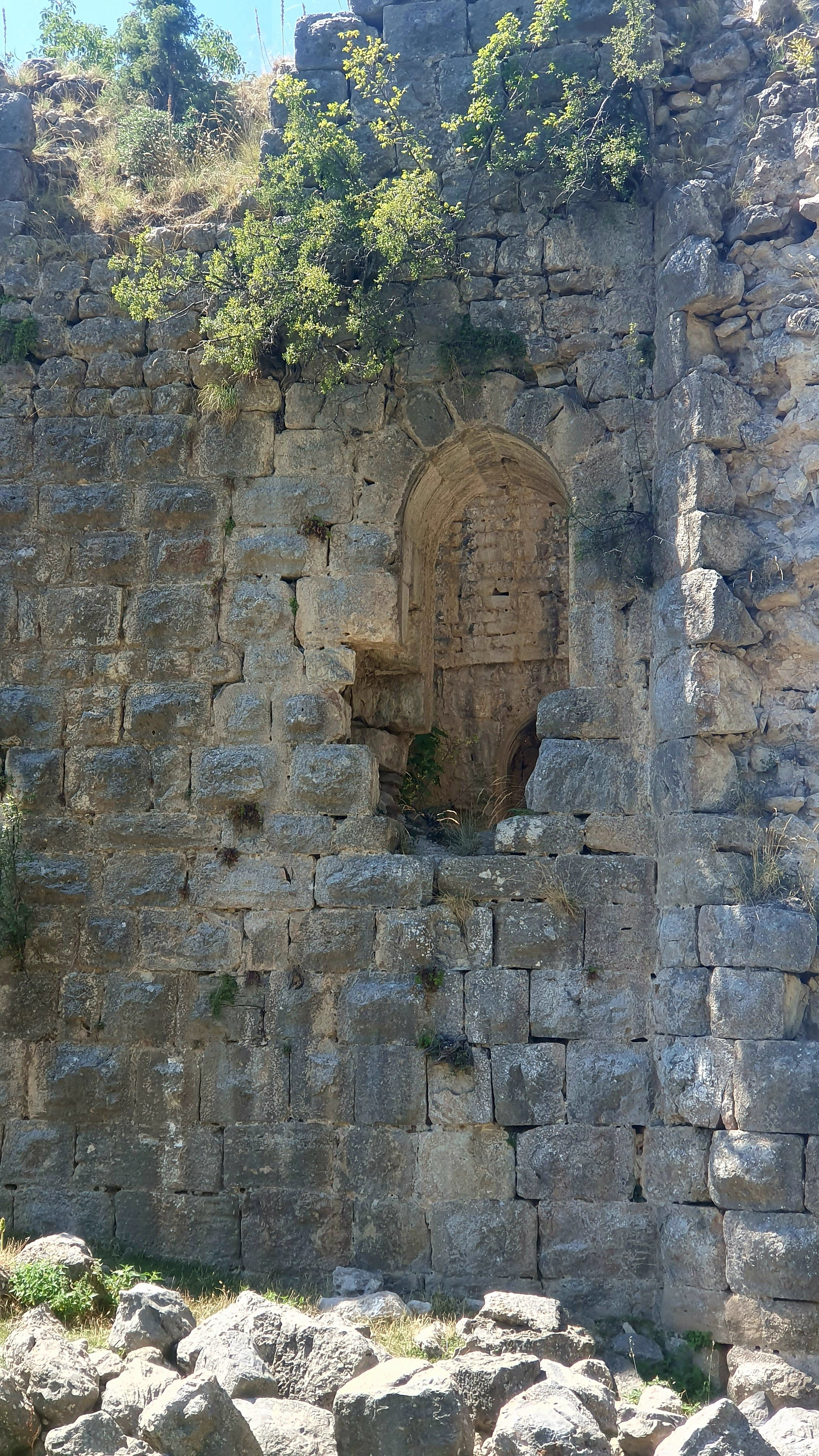
Sinap Castle, window detail in the northeast direction

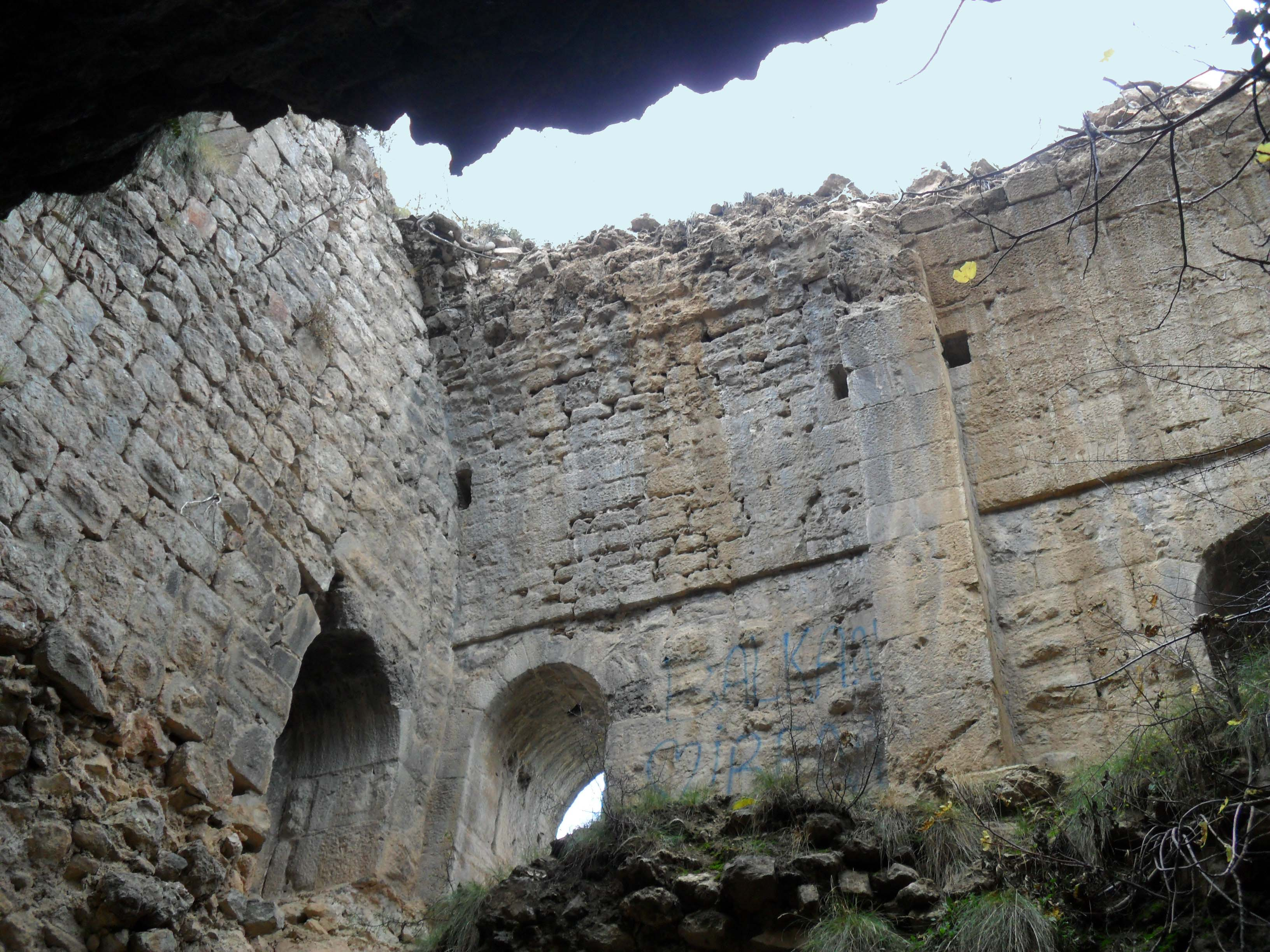
Sinap Castle interior

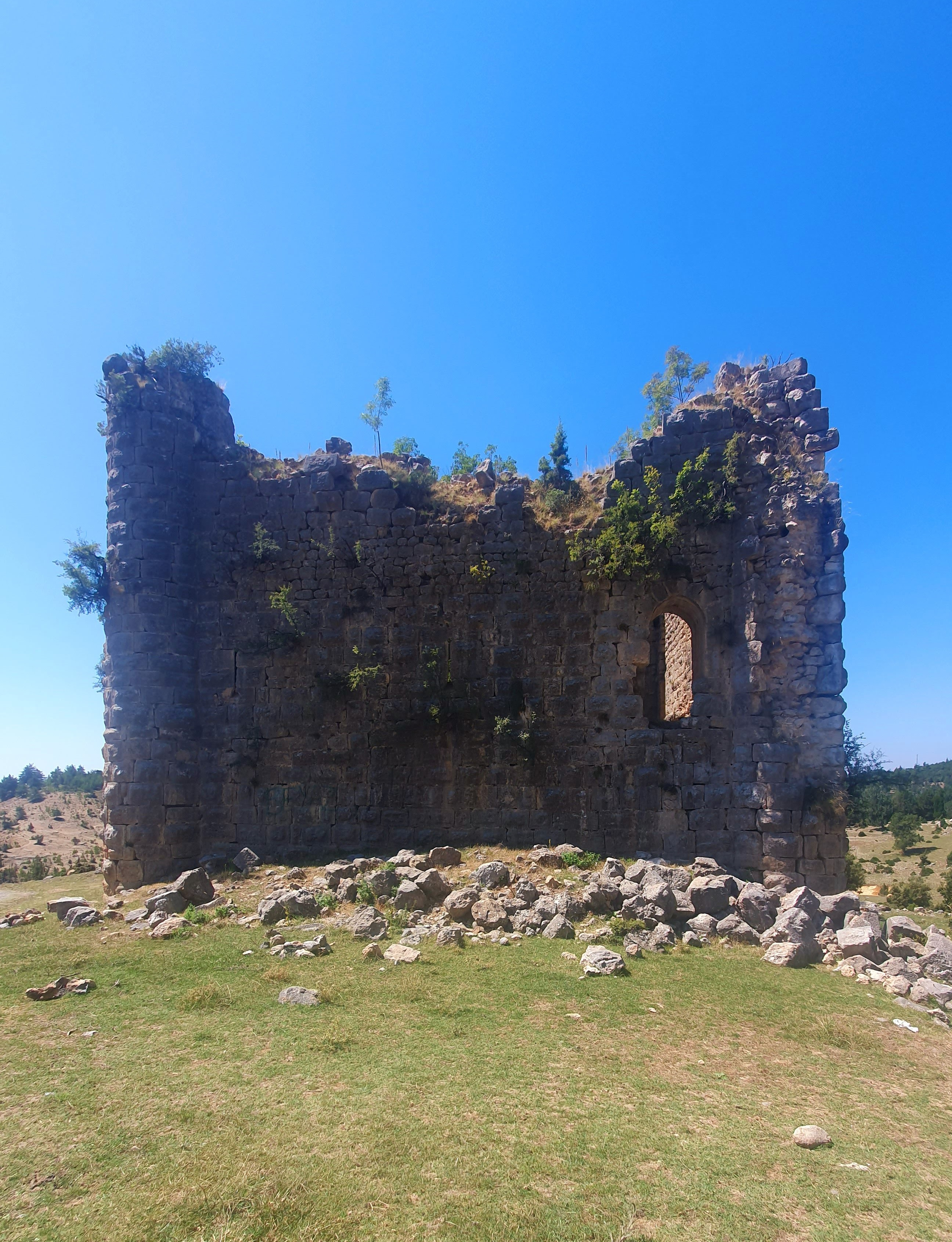
Sinap Castle, Northeast facade

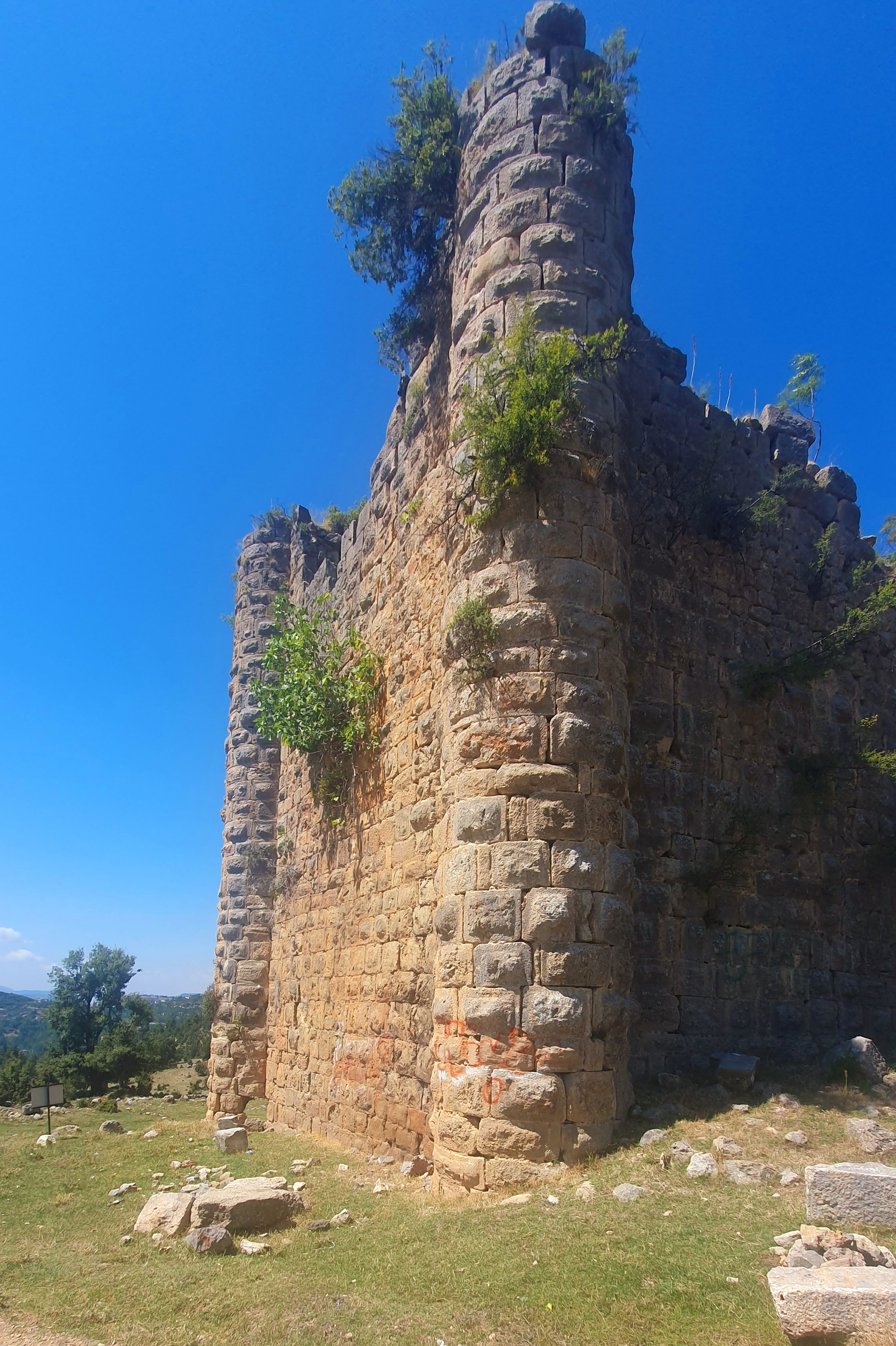
Sinap Castle, cylindrical bastion towards the east
