= Dağlı, Quba =

Human settlement in Azerbaijan

Coordinates: 41°22′N 48°30′E

Dağlı (also, Daghly) is a municipality and village in the Quba District of Azerbaijan. It has a population of 2,243.
