= Kuzucubelen Castle =

Castle in Mersin province, Turkey

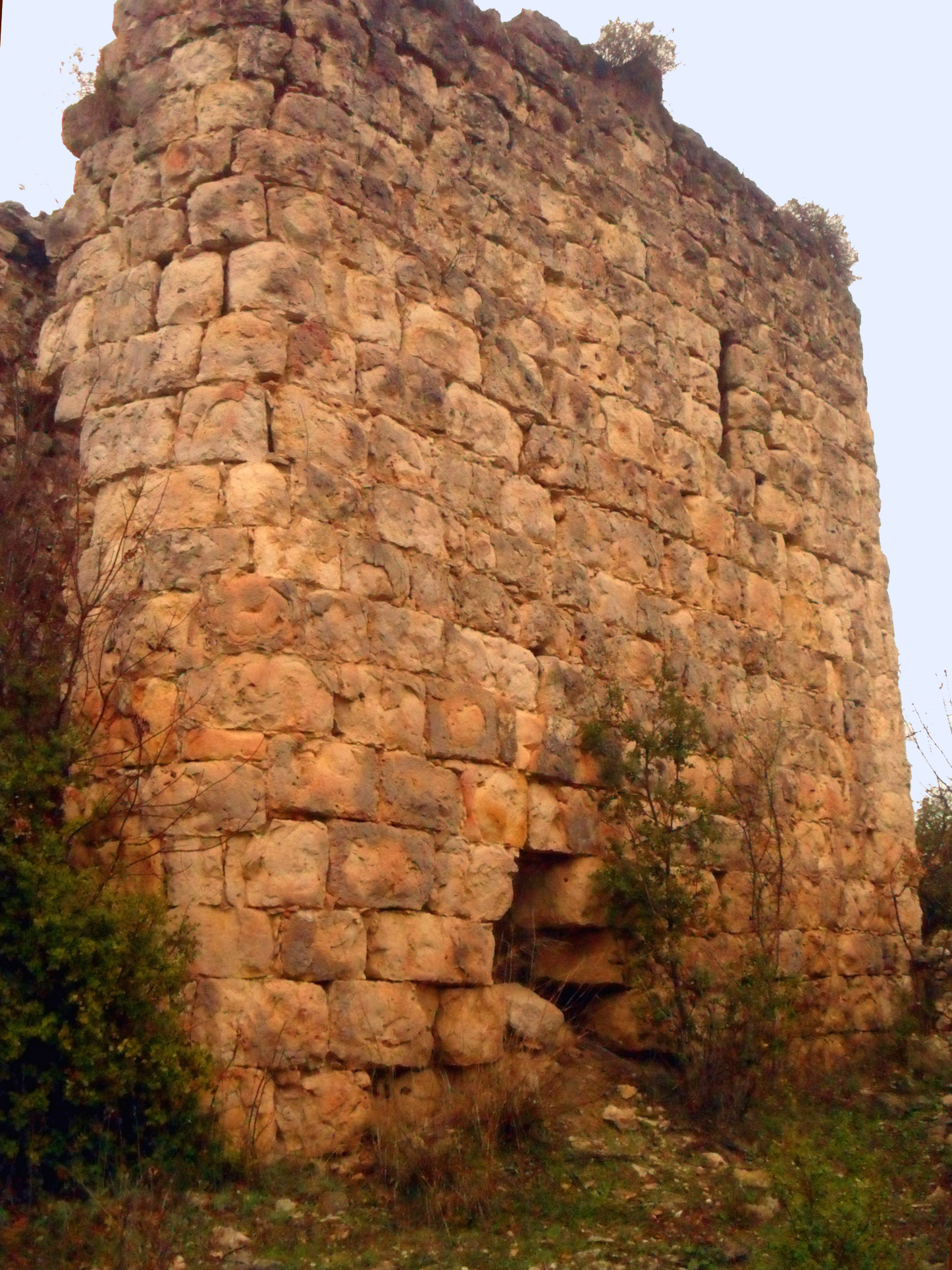
Kuzucubelen Castle.

Kuzucubelen Castle is a castle ruin in Mersin Province, Turkey.

At 36°50′31″N 34°25′57″E it is in Mezitli ilçe (district) of Mersin Province. Its distance to Mersin is 34 kilometres (21 mi) It is situated to the west of the village with the same name. Although the exact construction date is unknown it is a medieval castle and was used during the Roman or Byzantine Empire eras. It was one of the smaller fortifications used to control the roads.

The gate of the two-storey rectangular-plan castle is on the north west side. Although the walls are standing the arches were demolished. The masonry and design indicate that it was built in the 12th or 13th century during the period of the Armenian Kingdom of Cilicia. The fortification was surveyed in 1981. Located between Tece Castle and Başnalar this site guarded a route from the Mediterranean Sea to Cappadocia. There are also ruins of a church, a monastery and a cistern around the castle.
