= Lampron =

Castle in Çamlıyayla, Mersin, Turkey

Coordinates: 37°9′57″N 34°36′11″E

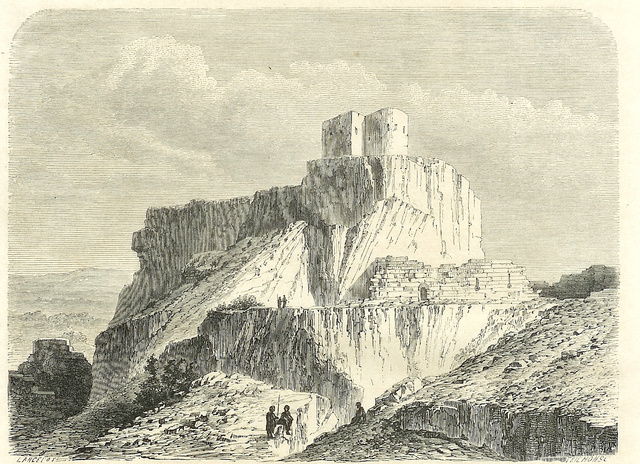
19th-century view of castle Lampron by Victor Langlois

Lampron (Armenian: Լամբրոն; French: Les Embruns; Turkish: Namrun Kalesi) is a castle near the town of Çamlıyayla in Mersin Province, Turkey. While part of the Armenian Kingdom of Cilicia in the Middle Ages, the castle was known as Lampron and was the ancestral home of the Armenian Hethumid princes. Situated in the Taurus Mountains, the fortress guarded passes to Tarsus and the Cilician Gates.

== History and architecture ==
Like many castles in the mountainous landscape of the former Armenian Kingdom of Cilicia, Lampron is situated on a pedestal of limestone which in this case projects from the southern tip of the Bulgar Dağı. The Armenians first settled this Byzantine site in the third quarter of the 11th century when Ōšin was given the fief of Lampron and the title of sebastos by the Byzantine Emperor. Within fifty years it became the near impregnable ancestral seat of the Het‘umid Dynasty. After several unsuccessful attempts (1171, 1176, and 1182) it was finally captured in the early 13th century by the Rubenid King Levon I through the subterfuge of marrying his niece to one of the Het‘umid nobles. When all were in attendance at the wedding feast in Tarsus, Levon’s army overran the castle. In the early 1240s it was the epicenter of a serious revolt against the Armenian king, when Lampron’s Baron Constantine joined the Seljuk Sultan Kaykhusraw II and attacked King Het‛um I. The decisive counterattack was led by Constable Smbat, the Baron of Papeřōn. Constantine was captured and executed for high treason in 1250. In 1309/10 it functioned briefly as the prison for the Lusignan King of Cyprus, Henry II. In the late 14th century a Mamluk garrison occupied the fortress.

The castle is conveniently situated at the intersection of three Highland valleys with commanding views of the converging roads. There is also inter-visibility with Sinap Castle, six kilometers to the northeast. Lampron covers an area approximately 330 by 150 meters. There is a drop of more than 50 meters to the valley below. At the extreme northwest a dry moat has been scarped to sever the fortress from the rest of the outcrop. The castle is divided into a small, slender lower ward at the south and west and a massive upper ward that is accessible only via rock-cut stairs and through a narrow turning entrance passage. On the southern and eastern flanks of the upper ward are the fragmented remains of numerous buildings, many of which have foundations cut directly into the rock. At the northern end are six magnificent vaulted chambers, two of which are fitted with casemates and embrasured loopholes. These six adjoining chambers are built with a carefully cut ashlar masonry. A small medieval-period bathhouse is located below the lower ward at the southwest.

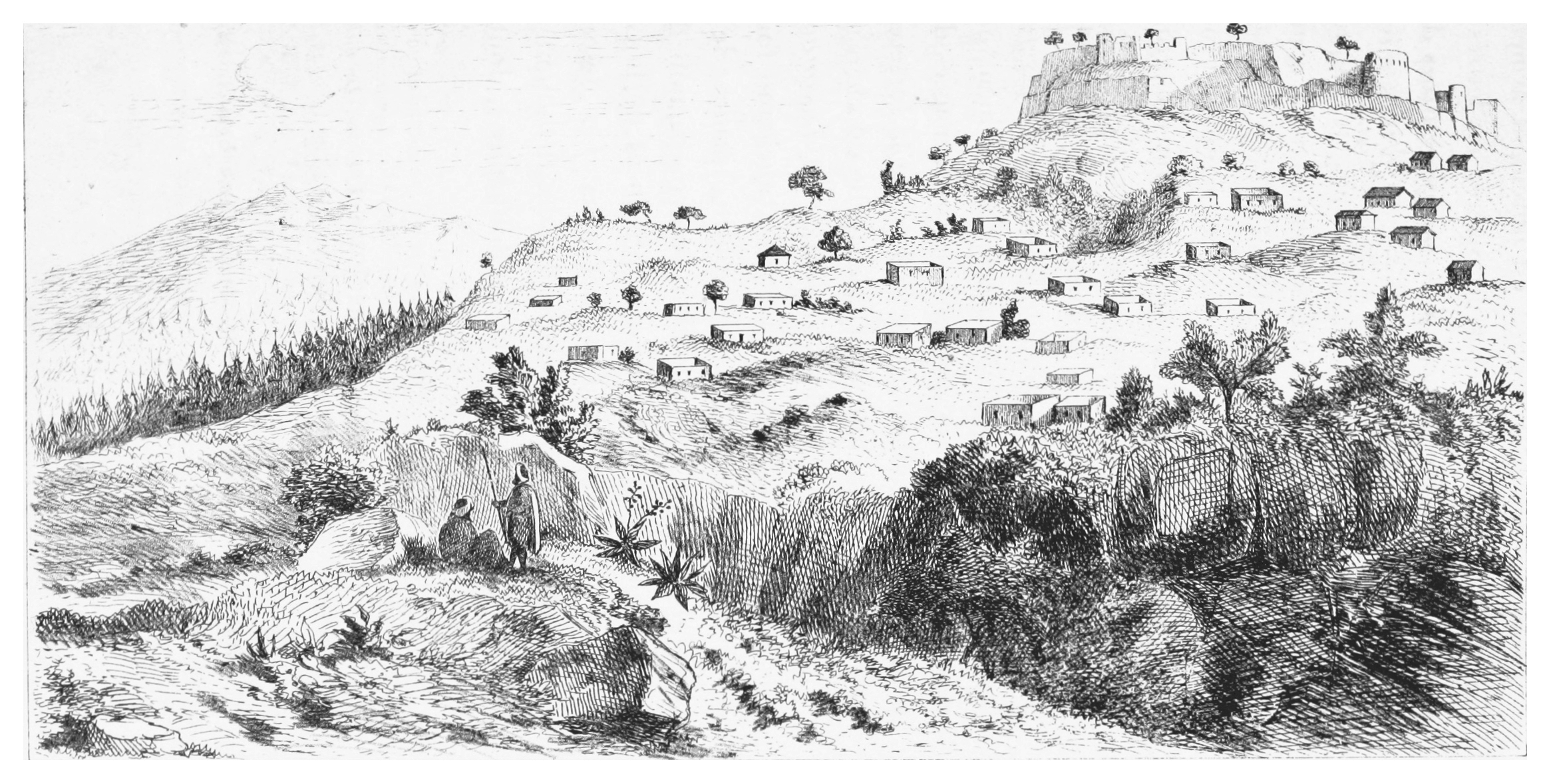
LANGLOIS (1861) p425 - FORTRESS DE LAMPRON

== In popular culture ==
The castle, along with its neighbouring Sinap Castle has been featured in the 2013 film Fear Through Eternity.

== See also ==
Other castles in the region include:

- Anavarza Castle
- Servantikar
- Yılankale
- List of Crusader castles
