= Akkuş =

- District and municipality
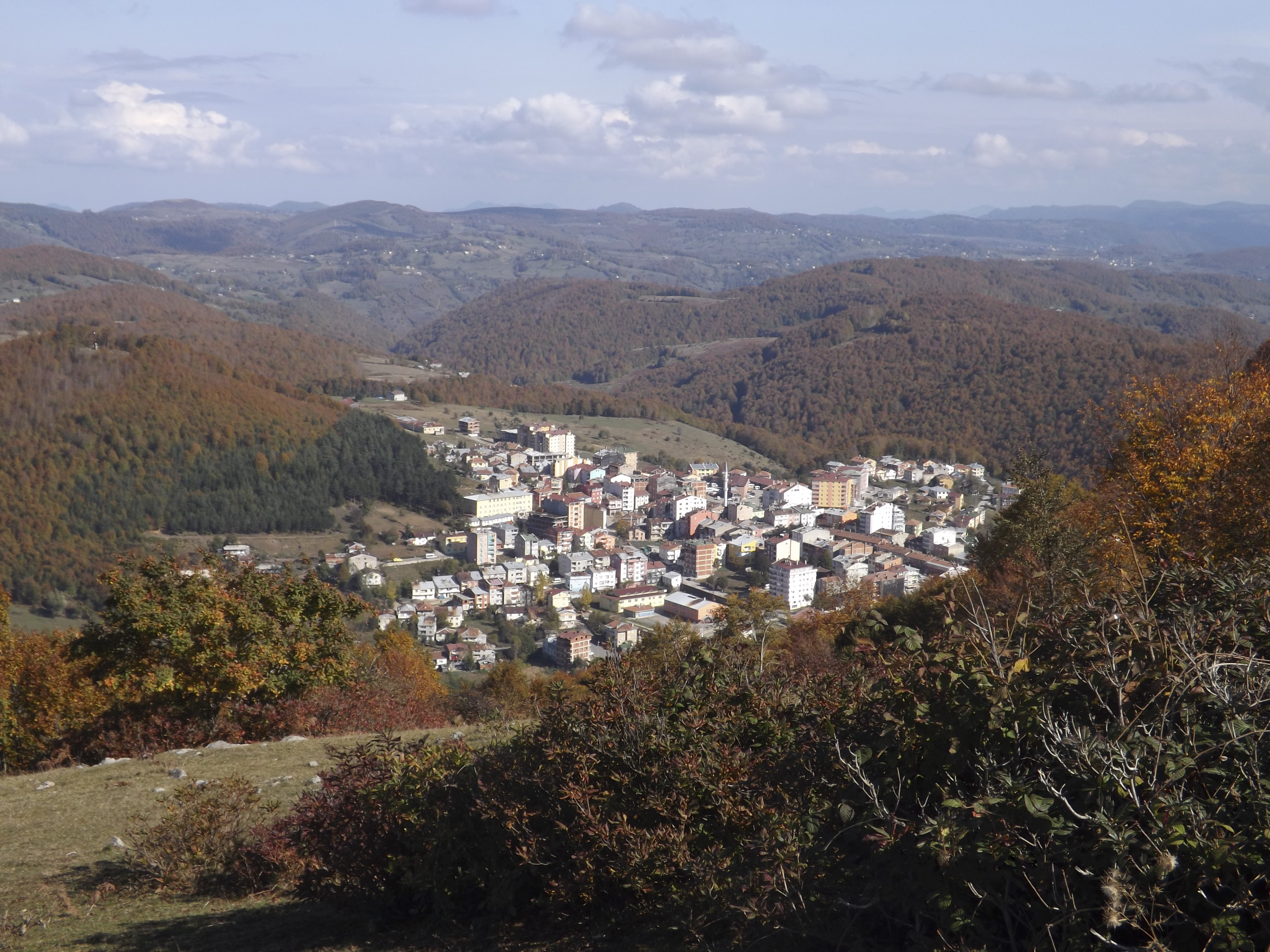
- General view of the town

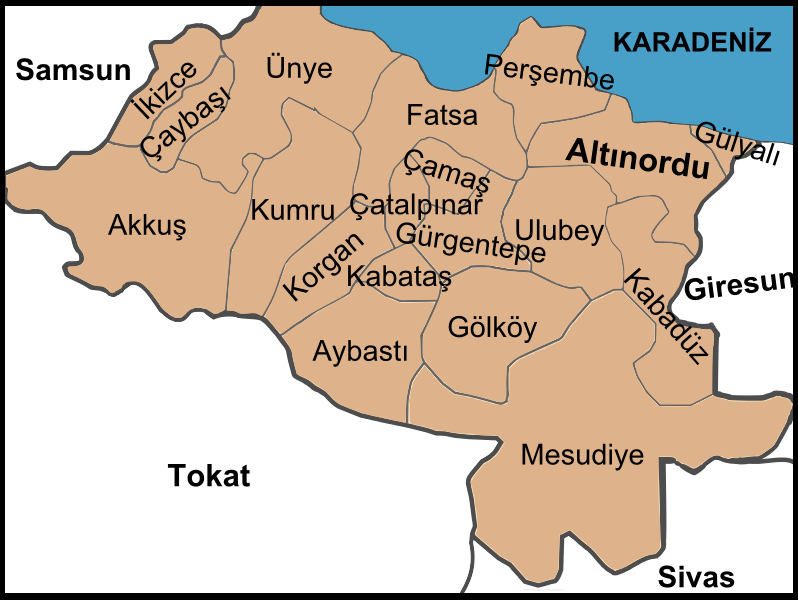
- Map showing Akkuş District in Ordu Province

- Location within Turkey
- Coordinates: 40°47′35″N 37°00′59″E
- Country: Turkey
- Province: Ordu

Government
  - Mayor: İsa Demirci (AKP)
- Area: 697 km^{2} (269 sq mi)
- Elevation: 1,313 m (4,308 ft)
- Population (2022): 21,258
  - Density: 30.5/km^{2} (79.0/sq mi)
- Time zone: UTC+3 (TRT)
- Postal code: 52950
- Area code: 0452
- Climate: Csb
- Website: www.akkus.bel.tr

Akkuş is a municipality and district of Ordu Province, Turkey. Its area is 697 km^{2}, and its population is 21,258 (2022). The town lies at an elevation of 1,313 m (4,308 ft).

== Geography ==
Akkuş is in the foothills of Mount Argan in the Canik range inland from the Black Sea coast. Two rivers, the Tifi and the Karakuş are formed from streams running down from these mountains. The climate is typical of high pasture country, the district is under snow for four to five months of the year, and fog and rain for the remainder. The summer sun occasionally shines and when it does the lush green countryside is beautiful. The area could attract visitors on trekking or winter sports vacations but lacks the infrastructure for this at the moment. The local economy depends on farming, forestry and grazing livestock plus some handicrafts including carpet weaving.

== History ==
Formerly known as Karakuş, the area was once part of the Kingdom of Pontus. The first Turkish rulers were the Danishmend and Hacıemiroğlu Anatolian beyliks and then from the 15th century the Ottoman Empire.

== Composition ==
There are 44 neighbourhoods in Akkuş District:

- Akpınar
- Alan
- Ambargürgen
- Çaldere
- Çamalan
- Çamlıca
- Çavdar
- Çayıralan
- Ceyhanlı
- Çökek
- Çukurköy
- Dağyolu
- Damyeri
- Düğencili
- Esentepe
- Gedikli
- Gökçebayır
- Gürgenliyatak
- Haliluşağı
- Karaçal
- Kargı
- Kemikgeriş
- Ketendere
- Kızılelma
- Koçcuvaz
- Külekçili
- Kurtboğaz
- Kuşçulu
- Merkez
- Meyvalı
- Muratlı
- Ormancık
- Ortabölme
- Şahin
- Salman
- Seferli
- Subaşı
- Tuzakköy
- Yazlıkbelen
- Yenimahalle
- Yeşilgüneycik
- Yeşilköy
- Yolbaşı
- Yukarıdüğencili

== Image gallery ==
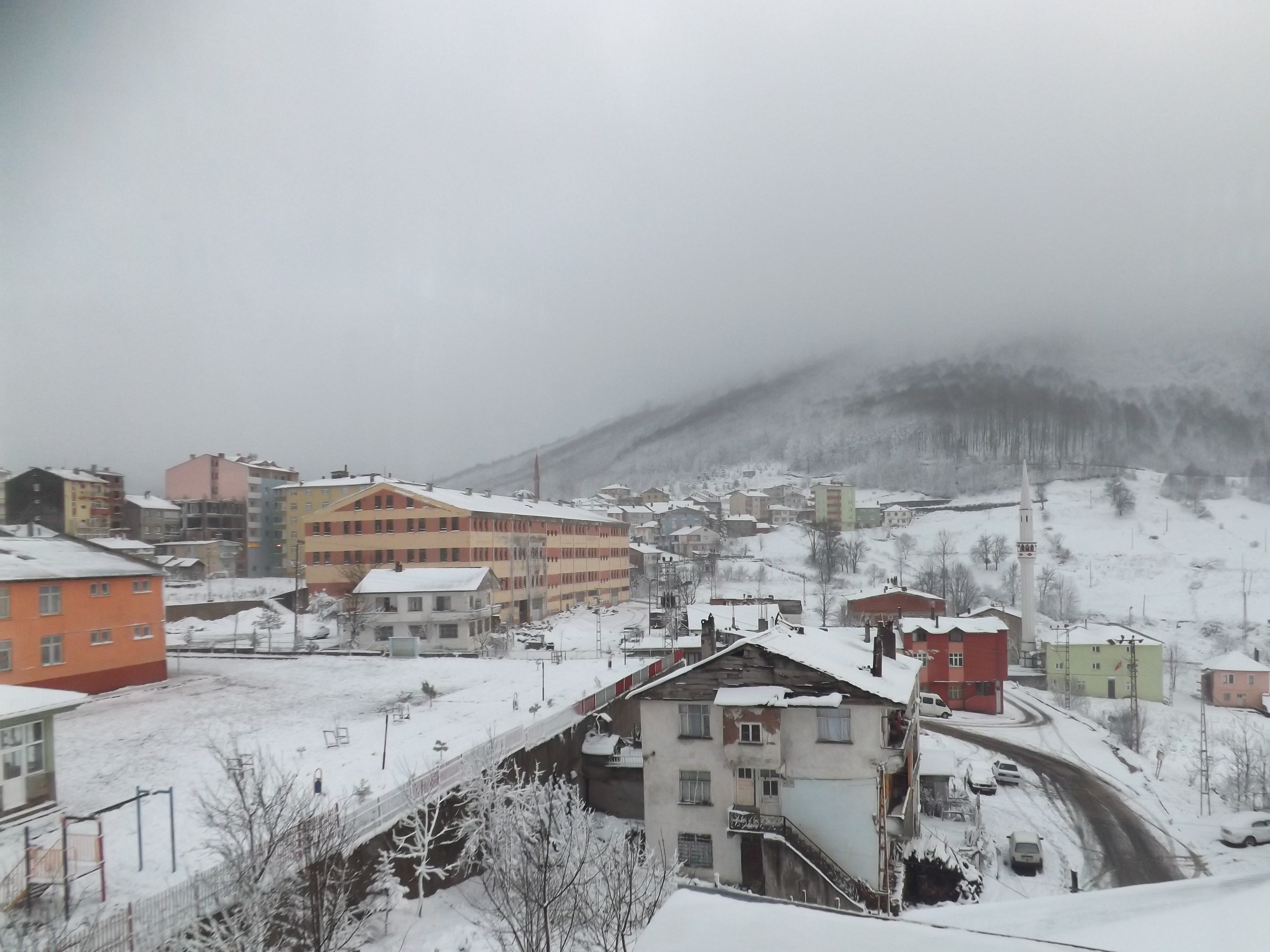
Akkus challenging winter

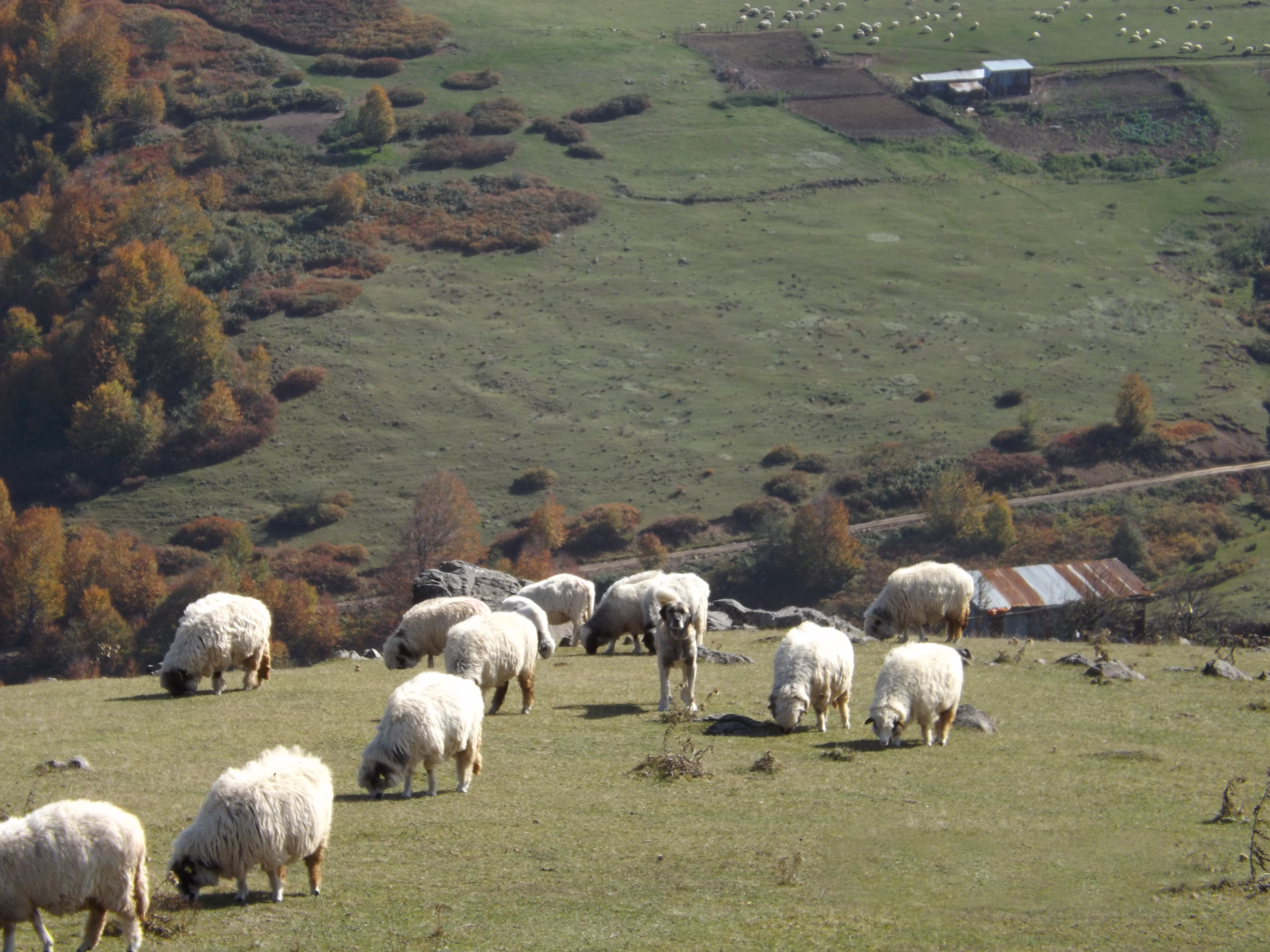
Argan is a square plateau
