= Kızlar Castle =

Castle ruin in Mersin, Turkey

Coordinates: 37°09′10″N 34°55′32″E

Kızlar Kalesi (literally "Maidens' castle") is a castle ruin in Mersin Province, Turkey.

== Geography ==
The castle ruin is situated in Tarsus district of Mersin Province. Travelers to the castle follow Turkish state highway D.400 which connects Tarsus to north. The road diverges to east from the village Dörtler (about 25 kilometres (16 mi) from Tarsus). After following the road for about 6 kilometres (3.7 mi) to Çavuşlu village the travelers face the castle to the south of the asphalt road. The last portion of the road is earth road. It is situated on a hill of 500 metres (1,600 ft) with respect to sea and 70 metres (230 ft) with respect to road.

== History ==
The castle can be dated back to the 4th century (Late Roman Empire era). Judging from the masonry and the repairs, it was also used in later ages.

== Description ==
The two-storey high castle was actually an observation tower. It has no gate and it is thought that its original entrance was via a wooden ladder. It has also an inner building. The rooms are arched and vaulted.
