= Dağlı Castle =

Ancient fortress in Turkey

- Mersin Province, Turkey
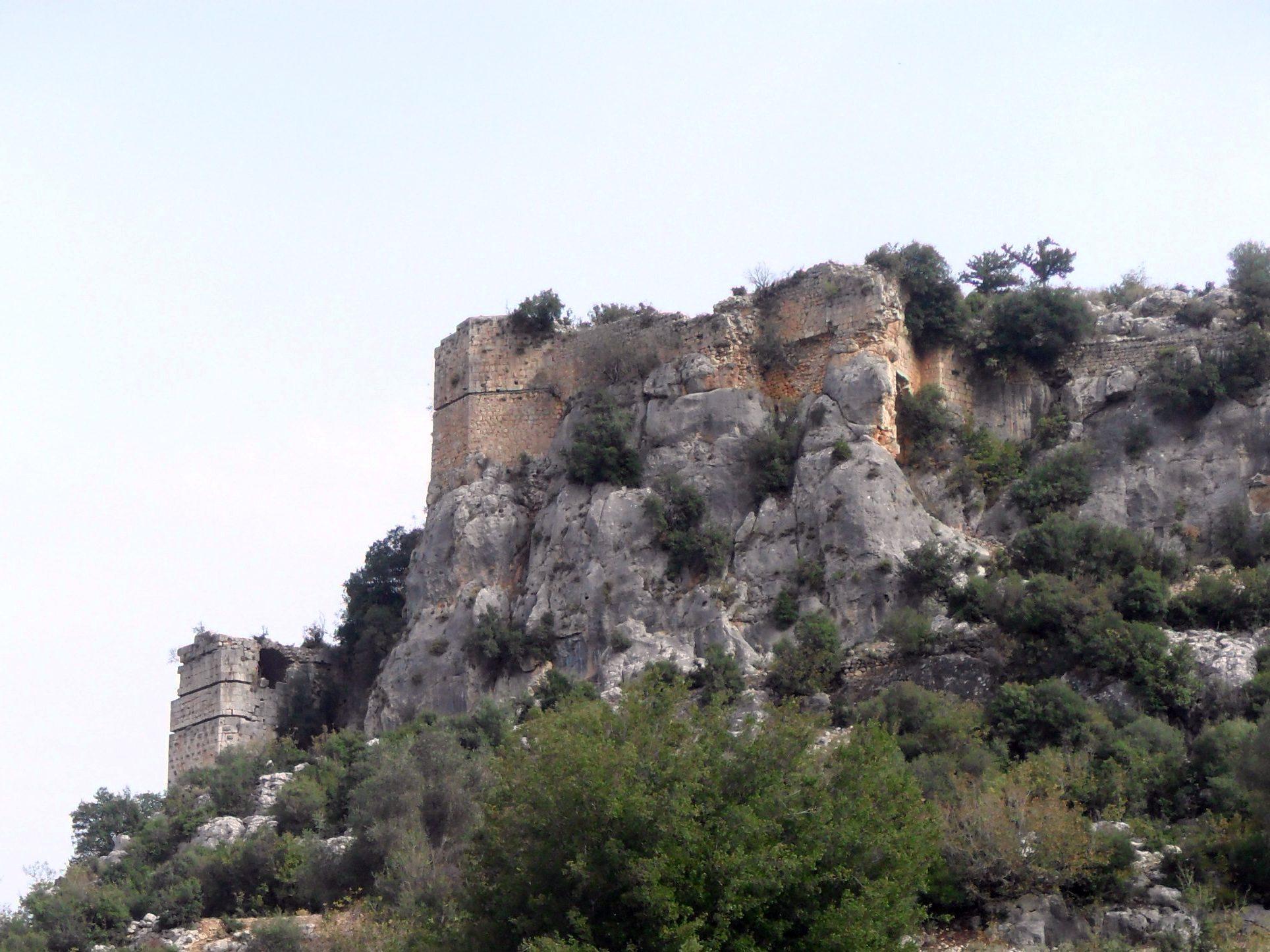

Site information
- Type: Fortress
- Open to the public: Yes
- Condition: Main room still standing

Location
- Coordinates: 36°42′23″N 34°15′18″E

Site history
- Built by: Roman Empire
- Demolished: Most of it

Dağlı Castle (Turkish: Dağlı Kalesi) is a castle ruin in Mersin Province, Turkey.

== Geography ==
The castle is around Dağlı Village of Erdemli District at 36°42′23″N 34°15′18″E. The distance between Erdemli and the village is 17 kilometres (11 mi) and the distance between the castle and Mersin is 52 kilometres (32 mi). Although there is a vehicle road to the village, there is no road from the village to the castle. Although a short portion of ancient castle road survives, the castle is accessible only through walking and partial climbing from the village. The elevation of the village is 510 metres (1,670 ft), the elevation of the castle is over 900 metres (3,000 ft), and the total walking track is about 2 kilometres (1.2 mi).

== History ==
The castle was built during the Roman Empire and later used by the Byzantine Empire and the Armenian Kingdom of Cilicia. It probably controlled ancient and medieval caravan routes.

== The castle ==
The castle is on a hill overlooking the Karakız valley. Most of the buildings as well as the walls are in ruins, but a large room known as the queen’s room survives. There are also two small compartments which are thought to have been toilets and some dark quarters which may have served as dungeons. Next to the main gate there is a rock relief showing two soldiers and one pregnant woman. There is also a highly effaced inscription. Although it was thought to be in Armenian, up to now only a few words could be deciphered. According to Professor Bogos Levon Zekiyan, only four words are readable: to son, Armenians, king and date.
