= Kahramanmaraş Castle =

- Kahramanmaraş Province, Turkey
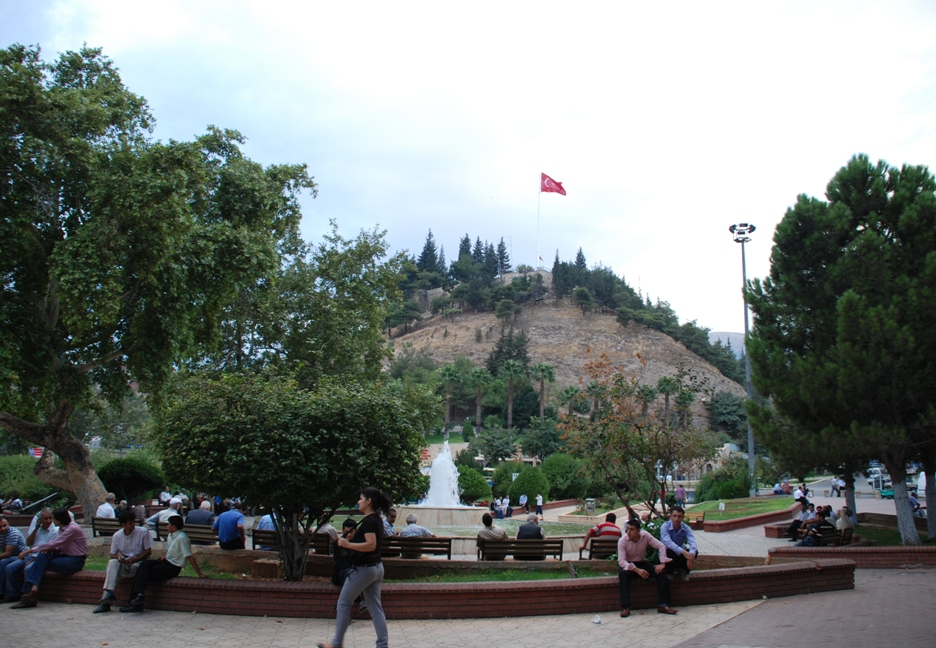

Site information
- Type: Fortress
- Open to the public: Yes
- Condition: Outer walls standing

Location
- Coordinates: 37°35′11″N 36°55′33″E

Site history
- Built: 1st Century B.C.-2nd Century A.D.
- Built by: Roman Empire (?)
- Demolished: Most of it

Kahramanmaraş Castle is a castle in Turkey. Kahramanmaraş (popularly Maraş) is an old city.

The castle is in the urban fabric of Kahramanmaraş city. It is at 37°35′11″N 36°55′33″E. It is on a tumulus so it isn't particularly high with respect to surrounding.

The exact construction date of the castle is not known. It was built between the 1st century B.C. and the 2nd century A.D. Its plan is rectangular. Its outer dimensions are 150 metres (490 ft) north to south and 75 metres (246 ft) east to west. Three of its square plan bastions have been restored by the Ministry of Culture and Tourism. The outer walls of the bastions are of asthar stone and the inner walls are of rubble stone. The main gate of the castle is on the south wall. The arrow slits are on the eastern wall.
