= Kızkalesi (castle) =

Island castle in Mersin Province, southern Turkey

- Near Kızkalesi, Erdemli; Mersin Province
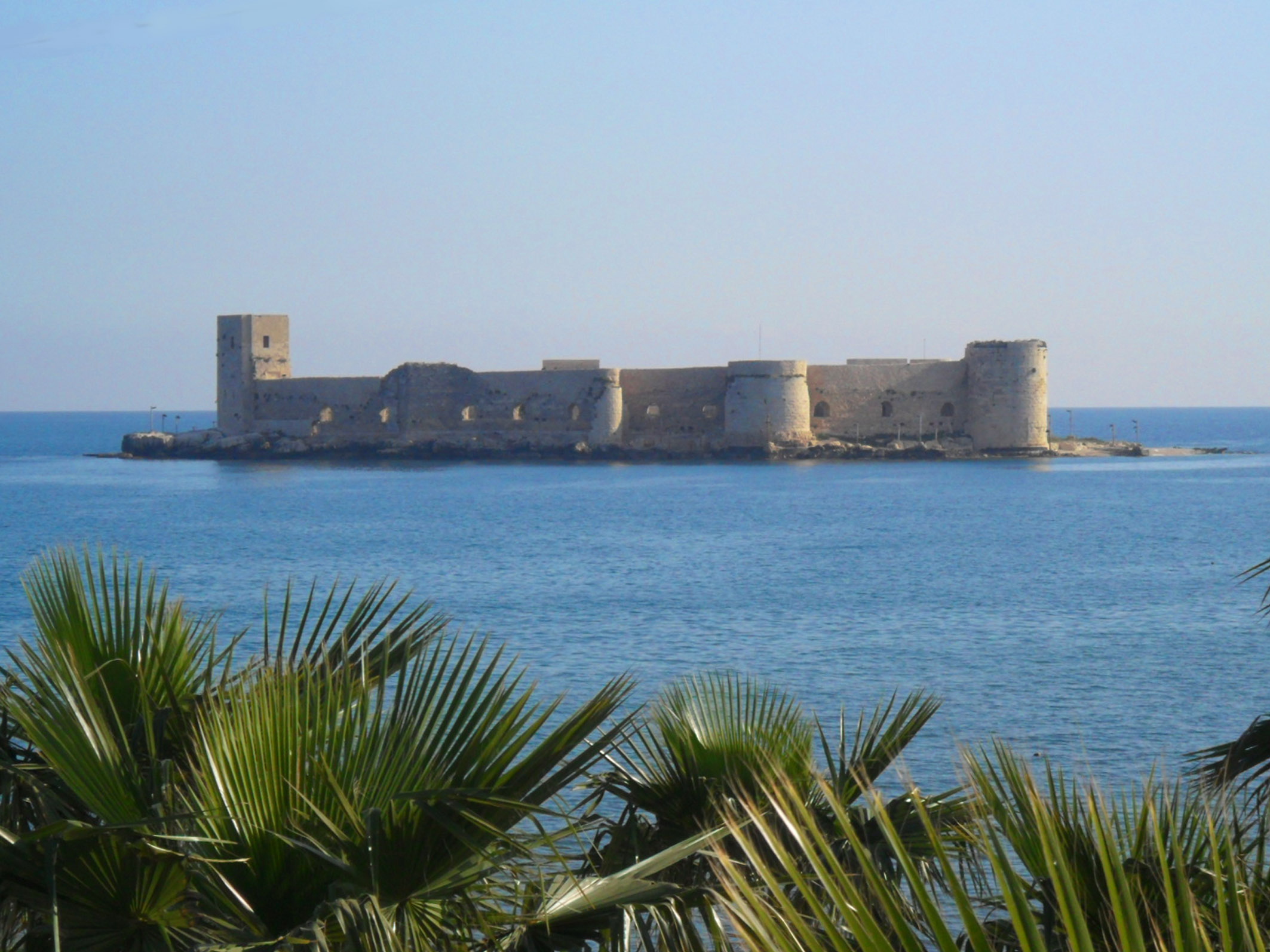
- Kızkalesi

Site information
- Type: Island castle
- Open to the public: Yes
- Condition: Partially standing

Location
- Coordinates: 36°27′23″N 34°08′53″E

Site history
- Built by: Byzantine Empire; Cilician Kingdom of Armenia
- Materials: Stone

Kızkalesi (from Turkish: "Maiden's Castle", also known as Deniz kalesi) is an island castle situated on a small island in Mersin Province of Turkey.

== Geography ==
The ancient name of the island was Crambusa (Greek: Γραμβούσσα, Gramvoussa). At 36°27′23″N 34°08′53″E it is about 300 metres (980 ft) off shore in the Mediterranean Sea. The total area of the island is about 15,000 square metres (160,000 sq ft) and the castle covers most of this area. Kızkalesi, the town facing the island in the main land which shares the same name as the island is 23 kilometres (14 mi) to Erdemli (district center) and 60 kilometres (37 mi) to Mersin (province center).

== History ==
According to Strabo, the island was used by the pirates in the ancient age. But the castle was probably built by Alexios I Komnenos of the Byzantine Empire after the First Crusade. It was extensively rebuilt in the 13th century by Leo I and at least one subsequent monarch of the Armenian Kingdom of Cilicia. Archaeological surveys published in 1982 and 1987 found that the original Byzantine plan survives primarily at the south with the characteristic square towers. The Armenians rebuilt the north and west sides of the castle with their distinctive rusticated ashlar masonry (not spolia from the late antique city) and round towers. They also put new facing stone on most of the Greek construction. Two Armenian inscriptions reportedly mention the rebuilding of this site by King Leo I (1206) and King Het‛um I (1251). The Armenians also built a barrel vaulted chapel inside the fort. The island was once connected to the mainland fort, Corycus castle, by a breakwater. The Armenians called this fortress Gorygos (Կոռիկոս).In the 14th century the Cilician Kingdom was on the verge of collapse and in 1360 Peter I of Cyprus captured the island at the request of the inhabitants. The castle was captured by İbrahim II of Karaman of the Karamanids, an Anatolian beylik, in 1448, and by Gedik Ahmet Pasha of the Ottoman Empire in 1471. The name Gorygos was changed to Kızkalesi.

== Description ==
The total length of the rampart is 192 metres (630 ft). The south and the west walls are perpendicular to each other. The north and east sides are surrounded by a curved rampart.

The main gate is on the north side and there is a minor gate and a gallery on the west side. There are 8 bastions each with a unique shape. An extensive photographic survey with plans of the two fortress at Kızkalesi was made between 1973 and 1981.

== Legend of Kızkalesi ==
According to the legend of Kızkalesi, a fortune teller informs the king that his beautiful daughter will be poisoned by a snake. He adds that even the king is unable to change her fate. Shocked by the fortune teller's words, the king tries to save the princess by building a castle on an island where no snakes live. He sends his daughter to live in the castle. But a snake hides in a grape basket sent from the mainland and poisons the princess. This legend is not unique to Kızkalesi and some other localities in Turkey share the same story.
