= Kozan Castle =

Fortress in Kozan District, Turkey

- Part of Many states
- Adana Province, Turkey
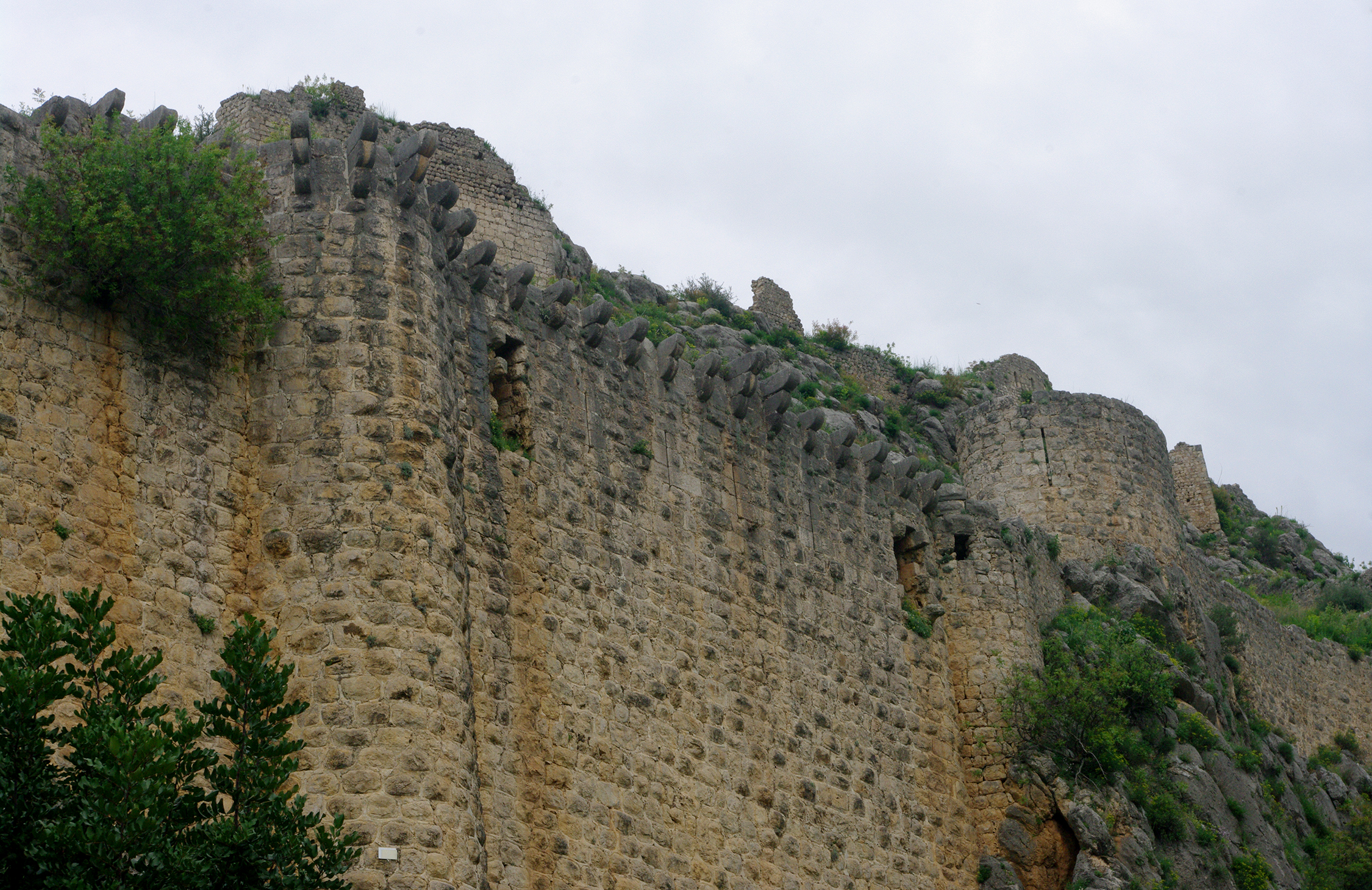
- From northwest

Site information
- Type: Fortress
- Open to the public: Yes

Location
- Location within Turkey
- Coordinates: 37°26′30″N 35°48′35″E

Site history
- Demolished: Most of it

Kozan Castle (Medieval: Sis Castle Turkish: Kozan Kalesi) is a castle in Kozan, Adana Province, Turkey.

The castle is situated on a 400 metres (1,300 ft) high hill at 37°26′30″N 35°48′35″E. 130 metres (430 ft) high Kozan city is just to the north of the castle. All nearby castles (like Anavarza Castle and Yılankale) are observable from Kozan castle.

There is no record of fortifications at the site prior to the Byzantine period. In 705 an Arab attack on the town was repelled, but its Christian population later abandoned the settlement and Sis became a fortified frontier post of the Abbasid's. In 962 a Byzantine army under Nikephoros II Phokas recaptured Sis, but nothing is known about its subsequent history until its capture in 1113 by Toros I, ruler of Cilician Armenia. After Kozan was captured by the Armenian Kingdom of Cilicia, the city became its capital after the capital was transferred from Anavarza sometime between 1180 and 1190.

Almost all of the castle dates from the period of the Armenian kingdom, the main possible exceptions being a vaulted entrance corridor which could be a Mamluk-era (i.e., post 1375) construction and which carries an Arabic inscription, and, beyond this corridor and at the rear of the Armenian-constructed main entrance, a simpler gateway that may have been the original Byzantine entrance to the site.

Inside the castle are the remains of two Armenian chapels - both probably from the 13th century. Both are heavily ruined; one is located in the central spur of the castle, the other inside a semicircular tower in the east wall of the southeast bailey.

The castle consists of two sections in a single outer rampart. There are 44 bastions on the rampart. The inner castle is in the southern section. There are also utility vaults used for storage.

The royal palace of the Armenian kings was a separate fortified structure located just below the castle. It was destroyed in 1375 during the Mamluk siege and capture of Sis. Two corner towers of its donjon remain standing.

== External sources ==
- Images of the castle
- Images of the castle
- Carefully documented photographic survey and plan of Sis Castle / Kozan
