= Bulduklu =

Bulduklu may refer to:

- Bulduklu, Kozan, a village in the Kozan District of Adana Province, Turkey
- Bulduklu, Amasya, a village in the District of Amasya, Amasya Province, Turkey

== See also ==
- Bulduk (disambiguation)
