= Çokak =

Çokak may refer to:

- Çokak, Kozan, village in Adana Province, Turkey
- Çokak, Tarsus, village in Mersin Province, Turkey
