= Bulduk =

Bulduk may refer to:

- Bulduk, Pazaryeri, a village in the District of Pazaryeri, Bilecik Province, Turkey
- Bulduk, Şabanözü
- Buldug, a village and municipality in the Sabirabad Rayon of Azerbaijan

== See also ==
- Bulduklu (disambiguation)
