= Gaziköy =

Gaziköy is a composite word. In Turkish Gazi means "veteran" and it usually refers to Kemal Atatürk, the founder of Turkey. Köy means "village". Gaziköy can refer to:

- Afania, a village in northern Cyprus
- Gaziköy, Kozan in Adana Province, Turkey
- Gaziköy, Sivas in Sivas Province, Turkey
- Gaziköy, Şarkışla in Sivas Province, Turkey
- Gaziköy, Şarköy in Tekirdağ Province, Turkey
- Gaziköy, Darende in Malatya Province, Turkey
