= Güneri =

Güneri (IPA: [gyˈneːri], literally "hero (Turkish: er (definite accusative eri)) of the day (Turkish: gün)", is a Turkish surname and toponym and may refer to:

== List of surname holders ==
- Elif Güneri (born 1987), Turkish footballer
- Güven Güneri (born 1987), Turkish footballer

== Place name ==
- Güneri, Kozan, village in the District of Kozan, Adana Province, Turkey

== Other ==
- Güneri (ruler) (died 1300), Karamanid ruler
