= Turunçlu =

Turunçlu (literally "place with bitter oranges") is a Turkish place name and may refer to:

- Turunçlu, Kozan, a village in Kozan district of Adana Province, Turkey
- Turunçlu, Mersin, a village in Yenişehir district of Mersin Province, Turkey
- Turunçlu, Yüreğir, a village in Yüreğir district of Adana Province, Turkey
- Strongylos, a village in Famagusta, Cyprus, whose Turkish name is Turunçlu
