= Alapınar =

Alapınar may refer to the following places in Turkey:

- Alapınar, Kozan, a village in the district of Kozan, Adana Province
- Alapınar, Kurucaşile, a village in the district of Kurucaşile, Bartın Province
- Alapınar, Refahiye
