= Çelenuşağı, Kozan =

Çelenuşağı
- Neighbourhood
- Location in Turkey
- Coordinates: 37°41′N 35°46′E
- Country: Turkey
- Province: Adana
- District: Kozan
- Population (2022): 102
- Time zone: UTC+3 (TRT)

Çelenuşağı is a neighbourhood in the municipality and district of Kozan, Adana Province, Turkey. Its population is 102 (2022). The village inhabited by Turkmens of the Varsak tribe.
