= Kuyuluk, Kozan =

Kuyuluk
- Neighbourhood
- Location in Turkey
- Coordinates: 37°22′54″N 35°51′53″E
- Country: Turkey
- Province: Adana
- District: Kozan
- Population (2022): 251
- Time zone: UTC+3 (TRT)

Kuyuluk is a village in the municipality and district of Kozan, Adana Province, Turkey. Its population is 251 (2022).
