= Faydalı, Kozan =

Faydalı
- Neighbourhood
- Location in Turkey
- Coordinates: 37°20′36″N 35°53′24″E
- Country: Turkey
- Province: Adana
- District: Kozan
- Population (2022): 1,163
- Time zone: UTC+3 (TRT)

Faydalı is a neighbourhood in the municipality and district of Kozan, Adana Province, Turkey. Its population is 1,163 (2022).
