= Akarca, Kozan =

Akarca
- Neighbourhood
- Location in Turkey
- Coordinates: 37°34′05″N 35°38′18″E
- Country: Turkey
- Province: Adana
- District: Kozan
- Population (2022): 73
- Time zone: UTC+3 (TRT)

Akarca is a neighbourhood in the municipality and district of Kozan, Adana Province, Turkey. Its population is 73 (2022).
