= Andıl, Kozan =

Andıl
- Neighbourhood
- Location in Turkey
- Coordinates: 37°33′N 35°48′E
- Country: Turkey
- Province: Adana
- District: Kozan
- Population (2022): 189
- Time zone: UTC+3 (TRT)

Andıl is a neighbourhood in the municipality and district of Kozan, Adana Province, Turkey. Its population is 189 (2022). Near the village are the remains of a monastic fortified estate house as well as a rectangular building (possibly the scriptorium) and the fragments of a medieval civilian settlement, all associated with the Armenian Kingdom of Cilicia. This site was the subject of an archaeological survey in 1979.
