= Durmuşlu, Kozan =

Durmuşlu
- Neighbourhood
- Location in Turkey
- Coordinates: 37°30′32″N 35°50′13″E
- Country: Turkey
- Province: Adana
- District: Kozan
- Population (2022): 379
- Time zone: UTC+3 (TRT)

Durmuşlu is a neighbourhood in the municipality and district of Kozan, Adana Province, Turkey. Its population is 379 (2022).
