= Kıbrıslar, Kozan =

Kıbrıslar
- Neighbourhood
- Location in Turkey
- Coordinates: 37°39′N 35°42′E
- Country: Turkey
- Province: Adana
- District: Kozan
- Population (2022): 204
- Time zone: UTC+3 (TRT)

Kıbrıslar is a neighbourhood in the municipality and district of Kozan, Adana Province, Turkey. Its population is 204 (2022). Former names of the village are Tirezek and Trazarg (Դրազարկ in the Armenian language). The village inhabited by Turkmens of the Varsak tribe.
