= Ferhatlı, Kozan =

Ferhatlı
- Neighbourhood
- Location in Turkey
- Coordinates: 37°29′51″N 35°52′52″E
- Country: Turkey
- Province: Adana
- District: Kozan
- Population (2022): 1,110
- Time zone: UTC+3 (TRT)

Ferhatlı is a neighbourhood in the municipality and district of Kozan, Adana Province, Turkey. Its population is 1,110 (2022). The village inhabited by Turkmens of the Varsak tribe.
