= Damyeri, Kozan =

Damyeri
- Neighbourhood
- Location in Turkey
- Coordinates: 37°22′59″N 35°37′58″E
- Country: Turkey
- Province: Adana
- District: Kozan
- Population (2022): 372
- Time zone: UTC+3 (TRT)

Damyeri is a neighbourhood in the municipality and district of Kozan, Adana Province, Turkey. Its population is 372 (2022).
