= Kızlarsekisi, Kozan =

Kızlarsekisi
- Neighbourhood
- Location in Turkey
- Coordinates: 37°37′N 35°40′E
- Country: Turkey
- Province: Adana
- District: Kozan
- Population (2022): 243
- Time zone: UTC+3 (TRT)

Kızlarsekisi is a neighbourhood in the municipality and district of Kozan, Adana Province, Turkey. Its population is 243 (2022). The village inhabited by Turkmens of the Varsak tribe.
