= Doğanalanı, Kozan =

Neighbourhood in the municipality and district of Kozan

Doğanalanı
- Neighbourhood
- Location within Turkey
- Coordinates: 37°28′44″N 35°30′58″E
- Country: Turkey
- Province: Adana
- District: Kozan
- Population (2022): 477
- Time zone: UTC+3 (TRT)

Doğanalanı is a neighbourhood in the municipality and district of Kozan, Adana Province, Turkey. Its population is 477 (2022).
