= Çamlarca, Kozan =

Çamlarca
- Neighbourhood
- Location in Turkey
- Coordinates: 37°36′40″N 35°57′30″E
- Country: Turkey
- Province: Adana
- District: Kozan
- Population (2022): 128
- Time zone: UTC+3 (TRT)

Çamlarca is a neighbourhood in the municipality and district of Kozan, Adana Province, Turkey. Its population is 128 (2022). The village inhabited by Turkmens of the Varsak tribe.
