= Aydın, Kozan =

Aydın
- Neighbourhood
- Location in Turkey
- Coordinates: 37.4102°N 35.5957°E
- Country: Turkey
- Province: Adana
- District: Kozan
- Population (2022): 775
- Time zone: UTC+3 (TRT)

Aydın is a neighbourhood in the municipality and district of Kozan, Adana Province, Turkey. Its population is 775 (2022).
