= Hacıbeyli, Kozan =

Hacıbeyli
- Neighbourhood
- Location in Turkey
- Coordinates: 37°18′42″N 35°52′42″E
- Country: Turkey
- Province: Adana
- District: Kozan
- Population (2022): 762
- Time zone: UTC+3 (TRT)

Hacıbeyli is a neighbourhood in the municipality and district of Kozan, Adana Province, Turkey. Its population is 762 (2022).
