= Arslanlı, Kozan =

Arslanlı
- Neighbourhood
- Location in Turkey
- Coordinates: 37°18′44″N 35°46′10″E
- Country: Turkey
- Province: Adana
- District: Kozan
- Population (2022): 720
- Time zone: UTC+3 (TRT)

Arslanlı is a neighbourhood in the municipality and district of Kozan, Adana Province, Turkey. Its population is 720 (2022).
