= Çandık, Kozan =

Çandık
- Neighbourhood
- Location in Turkey
- Coordinates: 37°28′01″N 35°44′09″E
- Country: Turkey
- Province: Adana
- District: Kozan
- Population (2022): 668
- Time zone: UTC+3 (TRT)

Çandık is a neighbourhood in the municipality and district of Kozan, Adana Province, Turkey. Its population is 668 (2022).
