= Dikilitaş, Kozan =

Dikilitaş
- Neighbourhood
- Location in Turkey
- Coordinates: 37°21′45″N 35°42′43″E
- Country: Turkey
- Province: Adana
- District: Kozan
- Population (2022): 318
- Time zone: UTC+3 (TRT)

Dikilitaş is a neighbourhood in the municipality and district of Kozan, Adana Province, Turkey. Its population is 318 (2022).
