= Enizçakırı, Kozan =

Enizçakırı
- Neighbourhood
- Location in Turkey
- Coordinates: 37°32′N 35°34′E
- Country: Turkey
- Province: Adana
- District: Kozan
- Population (2022): 267
- Time zone: UTC+3 (TRT)

Enizçakırı is a neighbourhood in the municipality and district of Kozan, Adana Province, Turkey. Its population is 267 (2022).
