= Zerdali, Kozan =

Zerdali
- Neighbourhood
- Location in Turkey
- Coordinates: 37°26′N 35°37′E
- Country: Turkey
- Province: Adana
- District: Kozan
- Population (2022): 452
- Time zone: UTC+3 (TRT)

Zerdali is a neighbourhood in the municipality and district of Kozan, Adana Province, Turkey. Its population is 452 (2022).
