= Karabucak, Kozan =

Karabucak
- Neighbourhood
- Location in Turkey
- Coordinates: 37°37′33″N 35°53′12″E
- Country: Turkey
- Province: Adana
- District: Kozan
- Population (2022): 257
- Time zone: UTC+3 (TRT)

Karabucak is a neighbourhood in the municipality and district of Kozan, Adana Province, Turkey. Its population is 257 (2022).
