= Turgutlu, Kozan =

Turgutlu
- Neighbourhood
- Location in Turkey
- Coordinates: 37.5122°N 35.8011°E
- Country: Turkey
- Province: Adana
- District: Kozan
- Population (2022): 1,506
- Time zone: UTC+3 (TRT)

Turgutlu is a neighbourhood in the municipality and district of Kozan, Adana Province, Turkey. Its population is 1,506 (2022).
