= Gökgöz, Kozan =

Gökgöz
- Neighbourhood
- Location in Turkey
- Coordinates: 37°35′37″N 35°37′28″E
- Country: Turkey
- Province: Adana
- District: Kozan
- Population (2022): 155
- Time zone: UTC+3 (TRT)

Gökgöz is a neighbourhood located in the municipality and district of Kozan, Adana Province, Turkey. Its population is 155 (2022).
