= Karahamzalı, Kozan =

Karahamzalı
- Neighbourhood
- Location in Turkey
- Coordinates: 37°35′53″N 35°52′23″E
- Country: Turkey
- Province: Adana
- District: Kozan
- Population (2022): 309
- Time zone: UTC+3 (TRT)

Karahamzalı is a neighbourhood in the municipality and district of Kozan, Adana Province, Turkey. Its population is 309 (2022).
