= Kalkumaç, Kozan =

Kalkumaç
- Neighbourhood
- Location in Turkey
- Coordinates: 37°42′N 35°40′E
- Country: Turkey
- Province: Adana
- District: Kozan
- Population (2022): 167
- Time zone: UTC+3 (TRT)

Kalkumaç is a neighbourhood in the municipality and district of Kozan, Adana Province, Turkey. Its population is 167 (2022).
