= Örendere, Kozan =

Örendere
- Neighbourhood
- Location in Turkey
- Coordinates: 37°36′N 35°48′E
- Country: Turkey
- Province: Adana
- District: Kozan
- Population (2022): 169
- Time zone: UTC+3 (TRT)

Örendere is a neighbourhood in the municipality and district of Kozan, Adana Province, Turkey. Its population is 169 (2022).
