= Ayşehoca, Kozan =

Ayşehoca
- Neighbourhood
- Location in Turkey
- Coordinates: 37°16′N 35°51′E
- Country: Turkey
- Province: Adana
- District: Kozan
- Population (2022): 521
- Time zone: UTC+3 (TRT)

Ayşehoca is a neighbourhood in the municipality and district of Kozan, Adana Province, Turkey. Its population is 521 (2022).
