= Karacaören, Kozan =

Karacaören
- Neighbourhood
- Location in Turkey
- Coordinates: 37.4342°N 35.7110°E
- Country: Turkey
- Province: Adana
- District: Kozan
- Population (2022): 285
- Time zone: UTC+3 (TRT)

Karacaören is a neighbourhood in the municipality and district of Kozan, Adana Province, Turkey. Its population is 285 (2022). Karacaören literally means "roe deer ruins" in Turkish.
