= Bucakköy, Kozan =

Bucakköy
- Neighbourhood
- Location in Turkey
- Coordinates: 37°26′38″N 35°54′13″E
- Country: Turkey
- Province: Adana
- District: Kozan
- Population (2022): 959
- Time zone: UTC+3 (TRT)

Bucakköy is a neighbourhood in the municipality and district of Kozan, Adana Province, Turkey. Its population is 959 (2022).
