= Minnetli, Kozan =

Neighbourhood in Kozan, Adana, Turkey (pop. 247)

Minnetli
- Neighbourhood
- Location in Turkey
- Coordinates: 37°35′45″N 35°55′25″E
- Country: Turkey
- Province: Adana
- District: Kozan
- Population (2022): 247
- Time zone: UTC+3 (TRT)

Minnetli is a neighbourhood in the municipality and district of Kozan, Adana Province, Turkey. Its population is 247 (2022). The village inhabited by Turkmens of the Varsak tribe.
