= Acarmantaş, Kozan =

Acarmantaş
- Neighbourhood
- Location in Turkey
- Coordinates: 37°28′N 35°54′E
- Country: Turkey
- Province: Adana
- District: Kozan
- Population (2022): 929
- Time zone: UTC+3 (TRT)

Acarmantaş is a neighbourhood in the municipality and district of Kozan, Adana Province, Turkey. Its population is 929 (2022).
