= Tufanlı, Kozan =

Tufanlı
- Neighbourhood
- Location in Turkey
- Coordinates: 37°25′N 35°45′E
- Country: Turkey
- Province: Adana
- District: Kozan
- Population (2022): 290
- Time zone: UTC+3 (TRT)

Tufanlı is a neighbourhood in the municipality and district of Kozan, Adana Province, Turkey. Its population is 290 (2022).
