= İdemköy, Kozan =

İdemköy
- Neighbourhood
- Location in Turkey
- Coordinates: 37.38756°N 35.73386°E
- Country: Turkey
- Province: Adana
- District: Kozan
- Population (2022): 481
- Time zone: UTC+3 (TRT)

İdemköy is a neighbourhood in the municipality and district of Kozan, Adana Province, Turkey. Its population is 481 (2022).
