= Kızıllar, Kozan =

Kızıllar
- Neighbourhood
- Location in Turkey
- Coordinates: 37.6835°N 35.6334°E
- Country: Turkey
- Province: Adana
- District: Kozan
- Population (2022): 849
- Time zone: UTC+3 (TRT)

Kızıllar is a neighbourhood in the municipality and district of Kozan, Adana Province, Turkey. Its population is 849 (2022).
