= Bulduklu, Kozan =

Bulduklu
- Neighbourhood
- Location in Turkey
- Coordinates: 37°23′14″N 35°53′22″E
- Country: Turkey
- Province: Adana
- District: Kozan
- Population (2022): 385
- Time zone: UTC+3 (TRT)

Bulduklu is a neighbourhood in the municipality and district of Kozan, Adana Province, Turkey. Its population is 385 (2022).

It is 15 km from Kozan. It consists of four parts: Central Bulduklu, Cercisli, Aydınlı, and Sehlikoğlu farm. The people in the village are mainly engaged in agriculture and breeding livestock and cattle, and there is a large grassland next to the village. The village is famous in the area for its green beans.

There is a primary school in the village, but middle school students from the village travel daily to schools in Pekmezci and Kozan. The mosque in the village was rebuilt in 1997. There is a coffeehouse where the villagers spend time and two grocery markets. The village is connected to the national telephone network and has access to internet service.
