= Ilıcaköy, Kozan =

Ilıcaköy
- Neighbourhood
- Location in Turkey
- Coordinates: 37.4783°N 35.8850°E
- Country: Turkey
- Province: Adana
- District: Kozan
- Population (2022): 974
- Time zone: UTC+3 (TRT)

Ilıcaköy is a neighbourhood in the municipality and district of Kozan, Adana Province, Turkey. Its population is 974 (2022).
