= Akçalıuşağı, Kozan =

Akçalıuşağı
- Neighbourhood
- Location in Turkey
- Coordinates: 37°41′N 36°02′E
- Country: Turkey
- Province: Adana
- District: Kozan
- Population (2022): 569
- Time zone: UTC+3 (TRT)

Akçalıuşağı is a neighbourhood in the municipality and district of Kozan, Adana Province, Turkey. Its population is 569 (2022).
