= Çürüklü, Kozan =

Çürüklü
- Neighbourhood
- Location in Turkey
- Coordinates: 37°38′55″N 35°56′28″E
- Country: Turkey
- Province: Adana
- District: Kozan
- Population (2022): 275
- Time zone: UTC+3 (TRT)

Çürüklü is a neighbourhood in the municipality and district of Kozan, Adana Province, Turkey. Its population is 275 (2022). The village inhabited by Turkmens of the Varsak tribe.
