= Görbeyaz, Kozan =

Görbeyaz
- Neighbourhood
- Location in Turkey
- Coordinates: 37°47′N 35°39′E
- Country: Turkey
- Province: Adana
- District: Kozan
- Population (2022): 177
- Time zone: UTC+3 (TRT)

Görbeyaz is a neighbourhood in the municipality and district of Kozan, Adana Province, Turkey. Its population is 177 (2022). In 2004 it passed from the Feke District to the Kozan District.
