= Sarvandikar =

Coordinates: 37°08′56″N 36°27′33″E

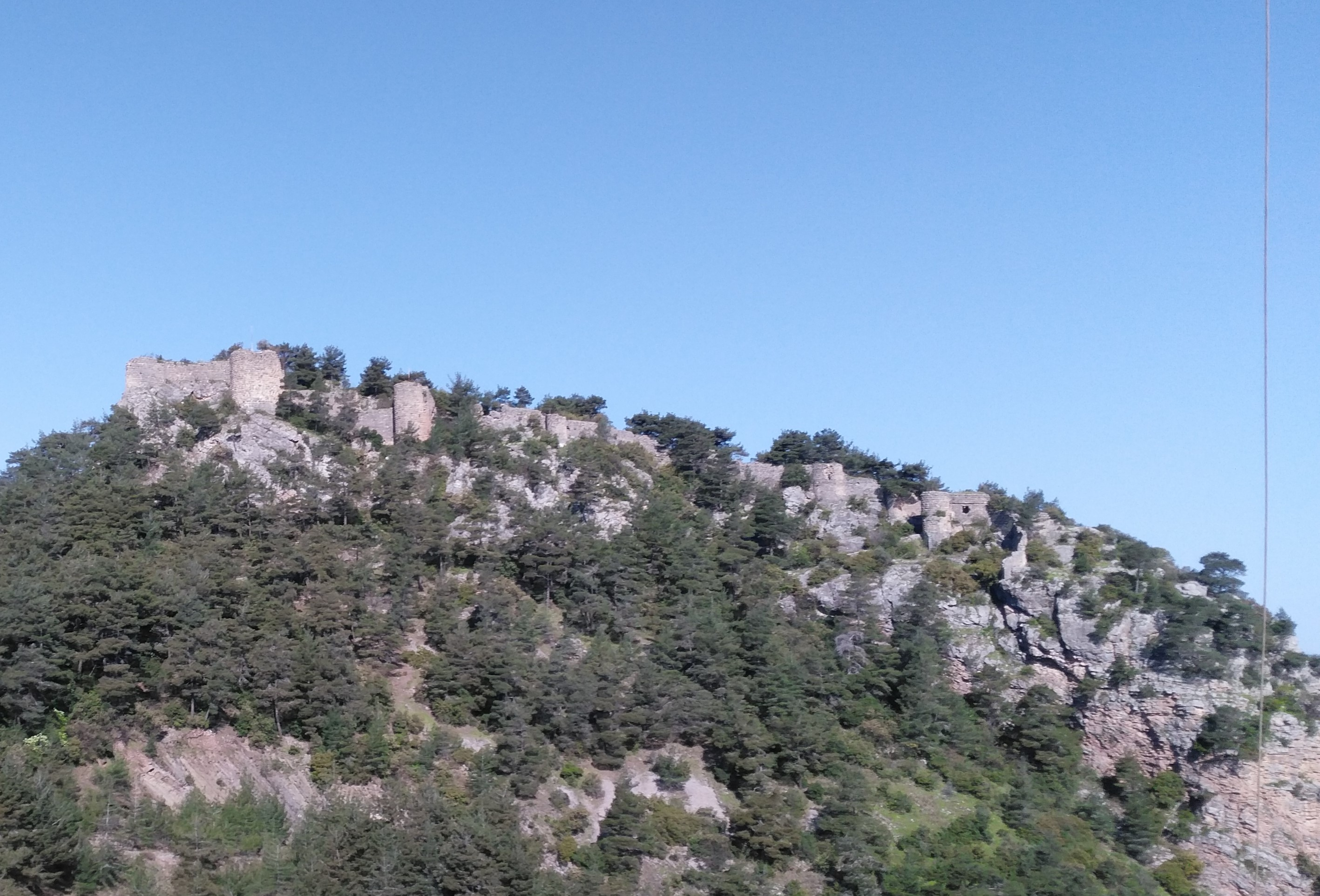

Sarvandikar (Armenian: Սարվանդիքար), also spelled Sarvanda k'ar (Turkish: Savranda). It was the Frankish castle of Savranda and is officially known today as Savranda Kalesi. The site is a medieval castle in the former Armenian Kingdom of Cilicia, located in Turkey's Osmaniye Province approximately 115 kilometers east of Adana.

== Etymology ==
Sarvandik'ar or Sarvandakar (Armenian: Սարվանդաքար) in old Armenian language means "Rocky plateau".

Turkish settlers called this fortress Savranda.

== Architecture and history ==
Savranda was built to guard the southern end of the Amanus Pass (or Syrian Gates). The fortress has two separate baileys that are heavily fortified with towers and sturdy curtain walls along the eastern and southern flanks, and protected at the north and west by steep rocky cliffs. Although there were brief periods of Byzantine occupation, the castle is primarily an Armenian construction which was commissioned by its Frankish lords. The first detailed historical and archaeological evaluation, including a surveyed plan of the entire complex, was completed in 1979 by R. W. Edwards. This complex is characterized by an irregular plan, which is carefully adapted to the outcrop, as well as round towers, a bent entrance, and a fine rusticated ashlar masonry. In addition, a small chapel was built into the perimeter wall just south of the gatehouse. In 1977 the Turkish government began the construction of a dam and hydroelectric station at the south end of the pass. Before the medieval village below the castle was destroyed a brief description was published.

Savranda castle was mentioned in 1069, when a band of Seljuks passed through the Amanus near the castle and its Byzantine garrison. During the First Crusade the troops of Tancred, Prince of Galilee, occupied the fortress and in 1101-02 imprisoned Raymond of Saint-Gilles there. In 1135 the Rubenid Baron Levon I captured the fort. A year later Levon himself was captured by the Franks and was released only after paying a substantial ransom, which included Savranda. After similar exchanges of ownership between 1172 and 1185, the castle was firmly the Armenian possession of the Het'umid Baron Smbat and his heirs from the 1190s until 1298. At that time the Mamluks temporarily occupied Savranda and returned in 1337 to end permanently Armenian suzerainty.

== See also ==
Other castles in the region include:

- Yılankale
- Lampron
- Anavarza Castle
- List of Crusader castles
