= Tepecikören, Kozan =

Tepecikören
- Neighbourhood
- Location in Turkey
- Coordinates: 37°22′N 35°38′E
- Country: Turkey
- Province: Adana
- District: Kozan
- Population (2022): 1,105
- Time zone: UTC+3 (TRT)

Tepecikören is a neighbourhood in the municipality and district of Kozan, Adana Province, Turkey. Its population is 1,105 (2022).
