= Orçan, Kozan =

Orçan
- Neighbourhood
- Location in Turkey
- Coordinates: 37°34′01″N 35°51′43″E
- Country: Turkey
- Province: Adana
- District: Kozan
- Population (2022): 289
- Time zone: UTC+3 (TRT)

Orçan (formerly: Dağlıca) is a neighbourhood in the municipality and district of Kozan, Adana Province, Turkey. Its population is 289 (2022).
