= Ergenuşağı, Kozan =

Ergenuşağı
- Neighbourhood
- Location in Turkey
- Coordinates: 37°38′N 35°36′E
- Country: Turkey
- Province: Adana
- District: Kozan
- Population (2022): 283
- Time zone: UTC+3 (TRT)

Ergenuşağı (Armenian: Bardzraberd) is a neighbourhood in the municipality and district of Kozan, Adana Province, Turkey. Its population is 283 (2022). The village inhabited by Turkmens of the Varsak tribe.
