= Yukarıkeçili, Kozan =

Yukarıkeçili
- Neighbourhood
- Location in Turkey
- Coordinates: 37°45′57″N 35°37′55″E
- Country: Turkey
- Province: Adana
- District: Kozan
- Population (2022): 265
- Time zone: UTC+3 (TRT)

Yukarıkeçili is a neighbourhood in the municipality and district of Kozan, Adana Province, Turkey. Its population is 265 (2022). The village inhabited by Turkmens of the Varsak tribe.
