= Kozan Dam =

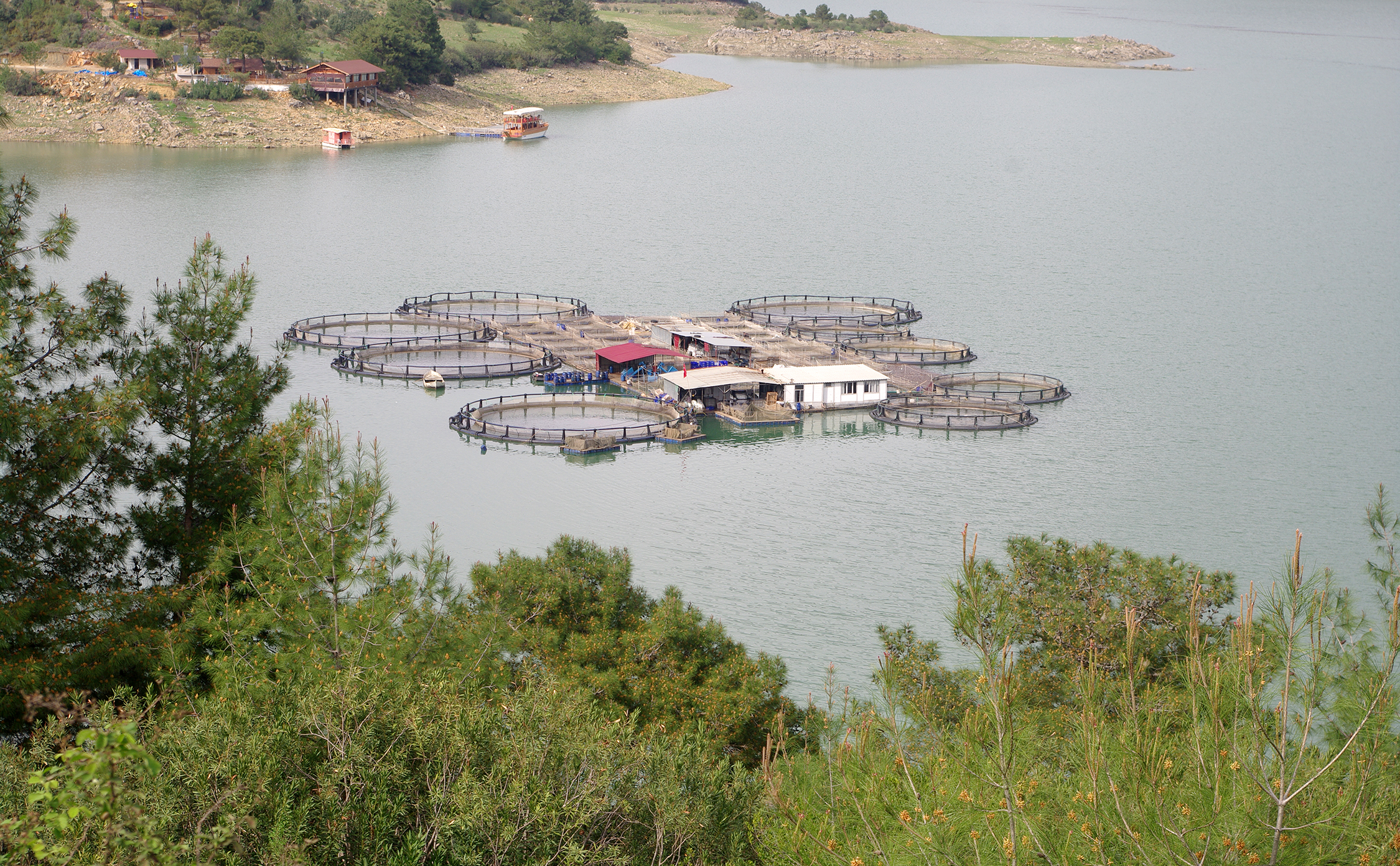

- Location within Turkey
- Location: Kozan
- Coordinates: 37°31′07″N 35°49′51″E
- Construction began: 1967
- Opening date: 1972

Dam and spillways
- Impounds: Kilgen River
- Height: 78 m (256 ft)
- Dam volume: 1,680,000 m^{3} (2,197,357 cu yd)

Reservoir
- Total capacity: 170,000,000 m^{3} (137,821 acre⋅ft)
- Surface area: 6 km^{2} (2 mi^{2})

The Kozan Dam is an embankment dam on the Kilgen River in Adana Province, Turkey. It is 8 km (5 mi) north of Kozan. Constructed between 1967 and 1972, the development was backed by the Turkish State Hydraulic Works. The purpose of the dam is flood control and irrigation. It helps irrigate 10,220 ha (25,254 acres) of land.

== See also ==
- List of dams and reservoirs in Turkey
