= Çulluuşağı, Kozan =

Çulluuşağı
- Neighbourhood
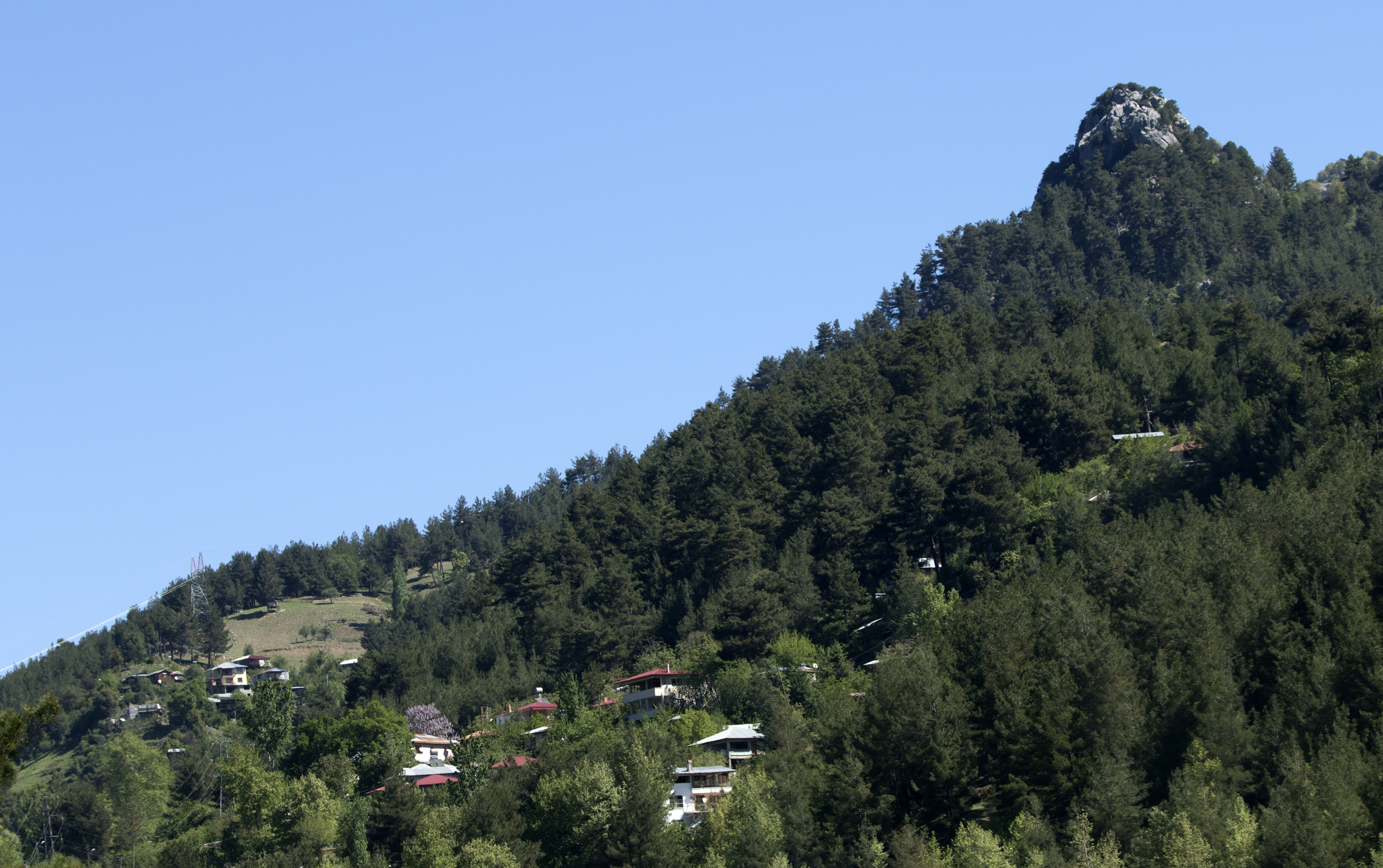
- Dışbudak quarter of Çulluuşağı

- Location within Turkey
- Coordinates: 37°41′N 35°52′E
- Country: Turkey
- Province: Adana
- District: Kozan
- Population (2022): 337
- Time zone: UTC+3 (TRT)

Çulluuşağı is a neighbourhood in the municipality and district of Kozan, Adana Province, Turkey. Its population is 337 (2022). The village inhabited by Turkmens of the Varsak tribe.
