= Özbaşı, Kozan =

Özbaşı
- Neighbourhood
- Location in Turkey
- Coordinates: 37°34′25″N 35°46′59″E
- Country: Turkey
- Province: Adana
- District: Kozan
- Population (2022): 130
- Time zone: UTC+3 (TRT)

Özbaşı is a neighbourhood in the municipality and district of Kozan, Adana Province, Turkey. Its population is 130 (2022). The village inhabited by Turkmens of the Varsak tribe.
