= Çobanpınarı, Kozan =

Çobanpınarı
- Neighbourhood
- Location in Turkey
- Coordinates: 37°25′55″N 35°53′41″E
- Country: Turkey
- Province: Adana
- District: Kozan
- Population (2022): 319
- Time zone: UTC+3 (TRT)

Çobanpınarı is a neighbourhood in the municipality and district of Kozan, Adana Province, Turkey. Its population is 319 (2022).
