= Işıklı, Kozan =

Işıklı
- Neighbourhood
- Location in Turkey
- Coordinates: 37°23′43″N 35°47′49″E
- Country: Turkey
- Province: Adana
- District: Kozan
- Population (2022): 714
- Time zone: UTC+3 (TRT)

Işıklı is a neighbourhood in the municipality and district of Kozan, Adana Province, Turkey.

== Demographics ==
Its population is 714 (2022).
