= Akdam, Kozan =

Akdam
- Neighbourhood
- Location in Turkey
- Coordinates: 37°33′05″N 35°37′09″E
- Country: Turkey
- Province: Adana
- District: Kozan
- Population (2022): 1,044
- Time zone: UTC+3 (TRT)

Akdam is a neighbourhood in the municipality and district of Kozan, Adana Province, Turkey. Its population is 1,044 (2022).
