= Şerifli, Kozan =

Şerifli
- Neighbourhood
- Location in Turkey
- Coordinates: 37°41′35″N 35°55′39″E
- Country: Turkey
- Province: Adana
- District: Kozan
- Population (2022): 279
- Time zone: UTC+3 (TRT)

Şerifli is a neighbourhood in the municipality and district of Kozan, Adana Province, Turkey. Its population is 279 (2022). The village inhabited by Turkmens of the Varsak tribe.
