= Anavarza Castle =

Castle in Adana Province, Turkey

- Adana Province, Turkey
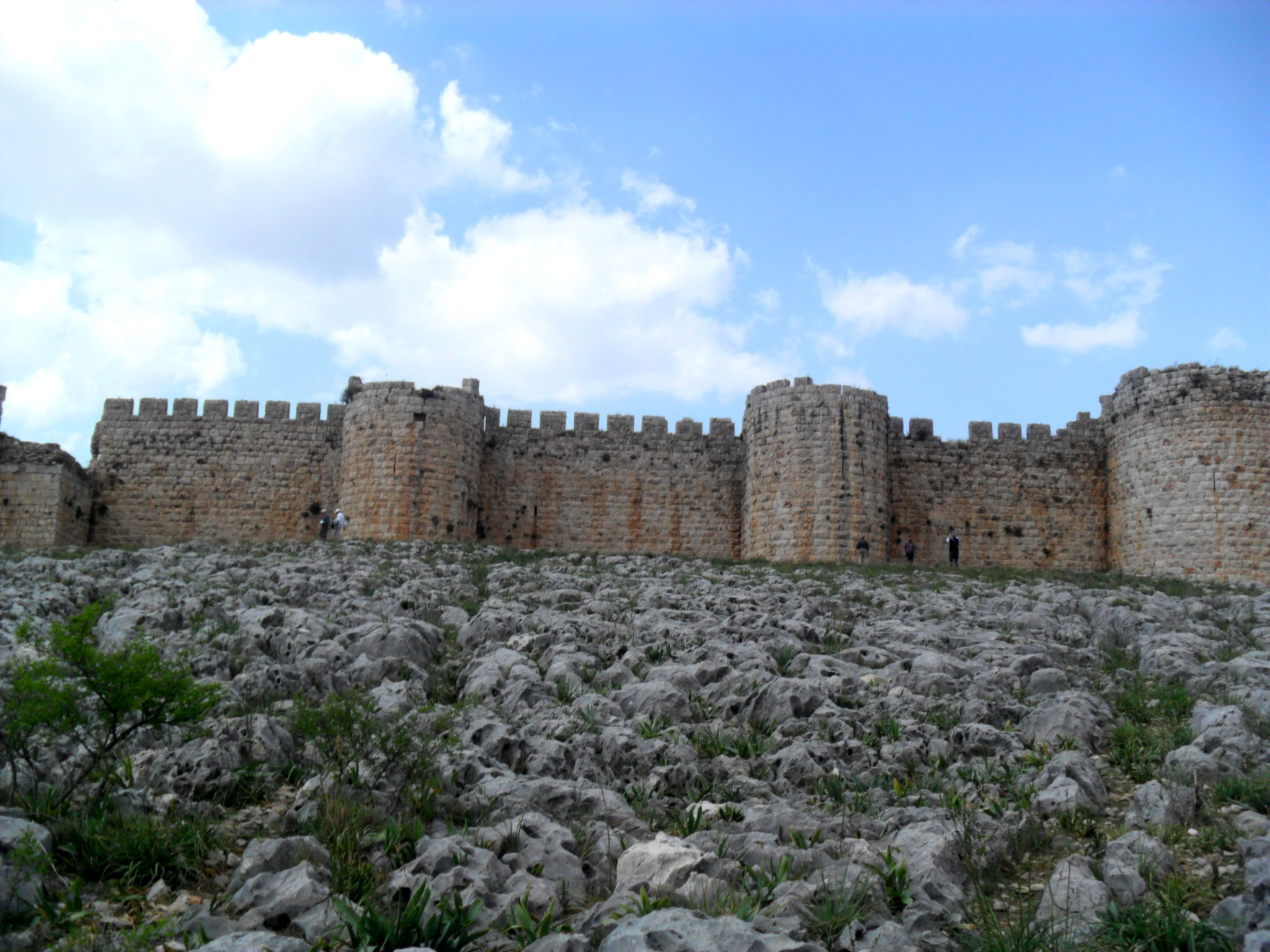
- The castle from the west

Site information
- Type: Fortress
- Open to the public: Yes
- Condition: Rampart and the main building standing

Location
- Coordinates: 37°15′03″N 35°53′50″E

Site history
- Built by: Roman Empire (?); Armenian Kingdom of Cilicia; Crusaders
- Demolished: Partially

Anvarza Castle is an ancient castle in Adana Province, Turkey.

== Geography ==
The castle lies to the east of Dilekkaya village of Kozan district. Visitors follow Turkish state highway D.400 and the highway to north for 26 kilometres (16 mi) and turn to east for 6 kilometres (3.7 mi). Although the vicinity of the castle is Çukurova plains (Cilicia of the antiquity) which is almost flat, there is a hill with steep slopes of about 150 metres (490 ft) high with respect to plains. The castle was built on the hill. The hill is accessible via a path from the south.

== History ==
The castle had been built to control the ancient city with the same name. The remains of the city (which is on the plains) lies between the village and the castle. The bird's flight distance between the remains and the castle is about 1 kilometre (0.62 mi). During the history the castle had switched hands and partially ruined several times (Roman Empire, Byzantine Empire, Abbasid Caliphate, Crusaders, Armenian Kingdom of Cilicia, Mamluks of Egypt etc.). Archaeological evidence indicates that the majority of the fortress is of Armenian construction, including the small basilica of T’oros I (AD 1111) and the chapels. The donjon was built by the Crusaders in the 12th century. Although the city was evacuated in 1274 following an earthquake the castle was used by Mamluks.

== Building ==
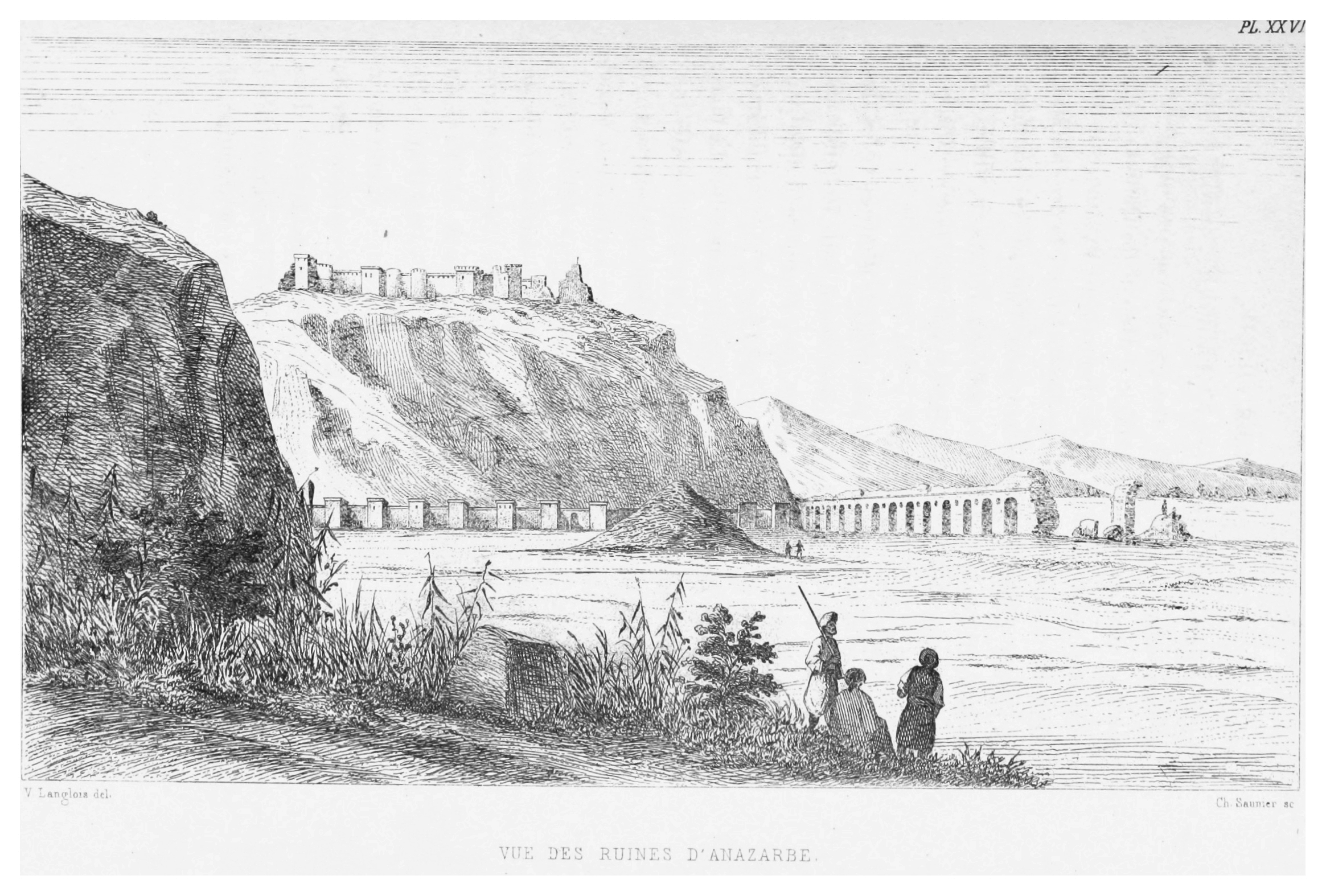
General view (c. 1860)

The height of the rampart is about 8 metres (26 ft). The length of the rampart from north to south is about 1,500 metres (4,900 ft). There are 20 bastions. The east to west dimensions are much less than the length. The north bailey has not been surveyed. The military quarters are confined to the south and central baileys, which are separated by the Crusader donjon. The castle can be visited free of charge.

== See also ==
Other castles in the region include:

- Servantikar
- Lampron
- Yılankale
- List of Crusader castles
