= Kemer, Kozan =

Kemer
- Neighbourhood
- Location in Turkey
- Coordinates: 37.5010°N 35.7427°E
- Country: Turkey
- Province: Adana
- District: Kozan
- Population (2022): 146
- Time zone: UTC+3 (TRT)

Kemer is a neighbourhood in the municipality and district of Kozan, Adana Province, Turkey. Its population is 146 (2022).
