= Salmanlı, Kozan =

Salmanlı
- Neighbourhood
- Location in Turkey
- Coordinates: 37°35′54″N 35°38′18″E
- Country: Turkey
- Province: Adana
- District: Kozan
- Population (2022): 136
- Time zone: UTC+3 (TRT)

Salmanlı is a neighbourhood in the municipality and district of Kozan, Adana Province, Turkey. Its population is 136 (2022). The village inhabited by Turkmens of the Varsak tribe.
