= Kozan, Adana =

City in Adana Province of Turkey

Kozan
- District and municipality
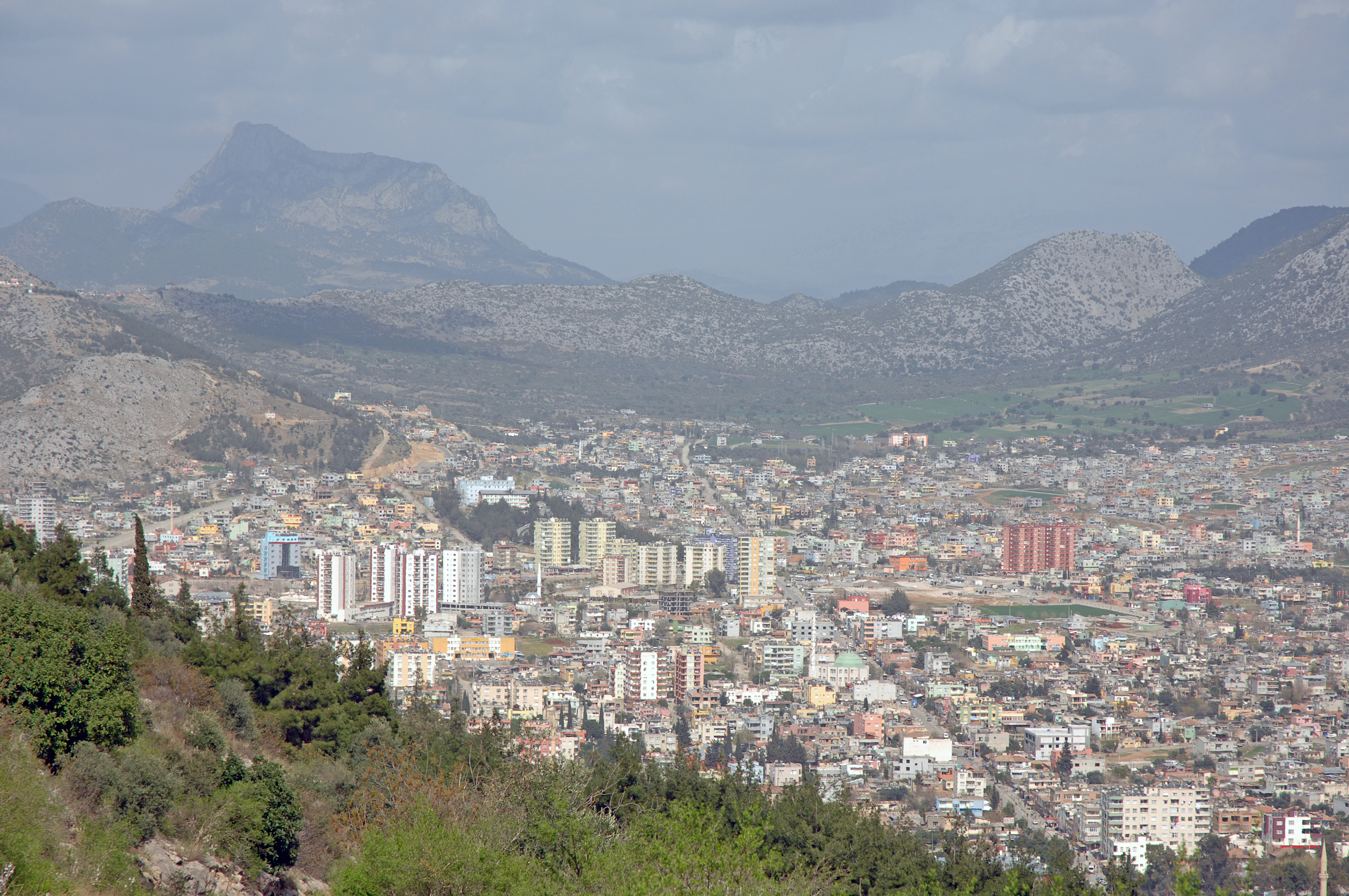
- View from Kozan Castle

- Logo

- Map showing Kozan District in Adana Province

- Location within Turkey
- Coordinates: 37°27′N 35°48′E
- Country: Turkey
- Province: Adana

Government
  - Mayor: Mustafa Atlı (MHP)
- Area: 1,903 km^{2} (735 sq mi)
- Elevation: 120 m (390 ft)
- Population (2022): 132,703
  - Density: 69.73/km^{2} (180.6/sq mi)
- Time zone: UTC+3 (TRT)
- Postal code: 01510
- Area code: 0322
- Website: www.kozan.bel.tr

Kozan, formerly Sis (Armenian: Սիս), is a municipality and district of Adana Province, Turkey. Its area is 1,903 km^{2}, and its population is 132,572 (2026). It is 68 kilometres (42 miles) northeast of Adana, in the northern section of the Çukurova plain. The Kilgen River, a tributary of the Ceyhan, flows through Kozan and crosses the plain south into the Mediterranean. The Taurus Mountains rise up sharply behind the town.

Sis was the capital of the Armenian Kingdom of Cilicia, today's Sis (ancient city), now called Kozan Kalesi, was built on a long rocky ridge in the center of the modern city.

The population of the city has grown rapidly in recent years, from 15,159 in 1960, to 54,451 in 1990, to 72,463 in 2007 and to 74,521 in 2009 (census figures).

== Names ==
The oldest known name is Sis or Siskia. Under the Roman Empire, it was for a time named Flavias or Flaviopolis. The Greek version of the older name, Σίσιον Sision, came back into use in the later Byzantine period. In Armenian, it is called Sis Սիս or Sissu.

Kozan (Ottoman Turkish: قوزان, romanized: qōzān) was originally the name of the administrative division the town Sis was a part of. This name originates from the Qōzānoğlu dynasty of derebeys that controlled the region from 1689 to 1865.

== History ==
=== Middle Ages ===
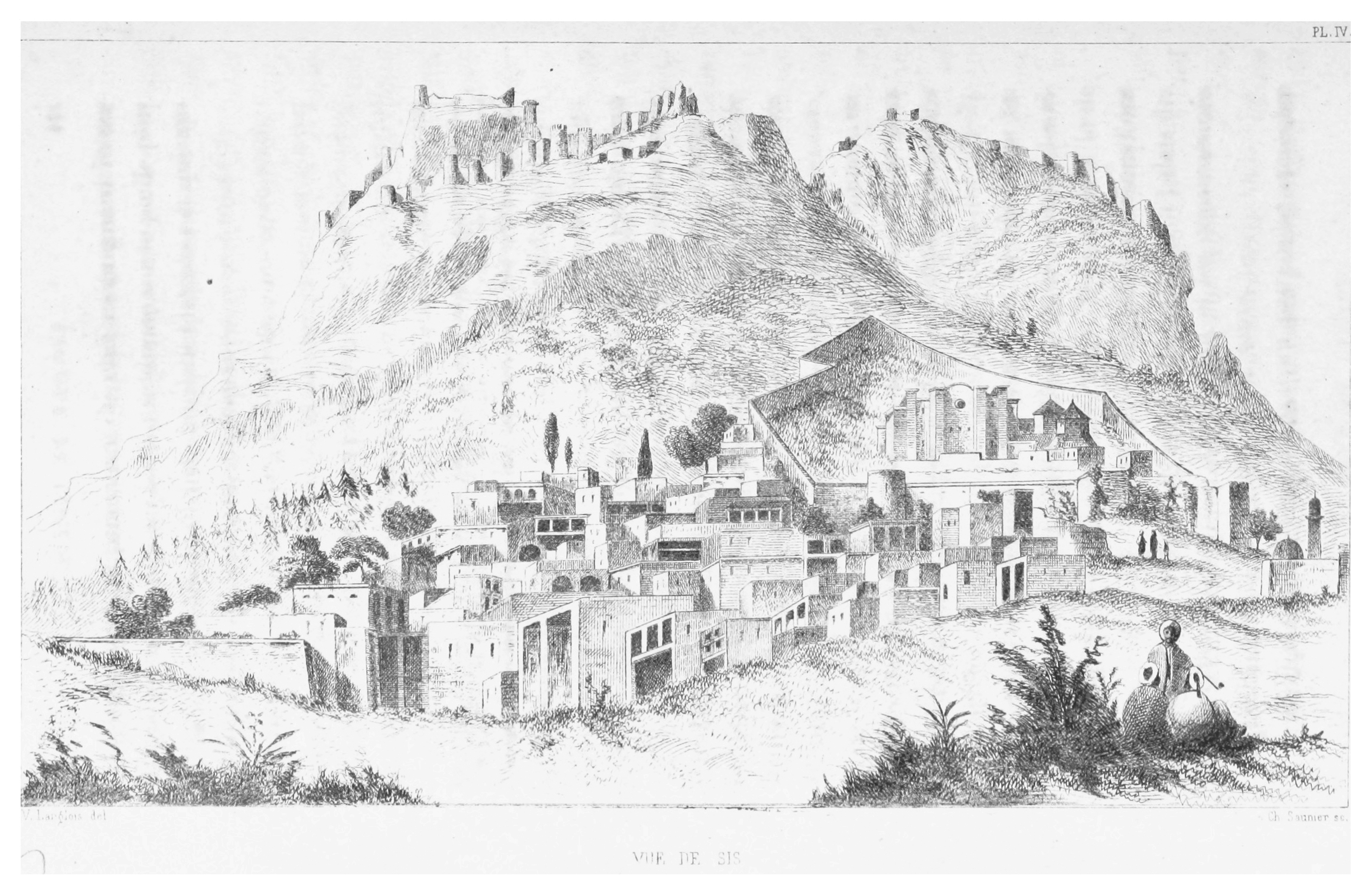
Panorama view of Sis (c.1855)

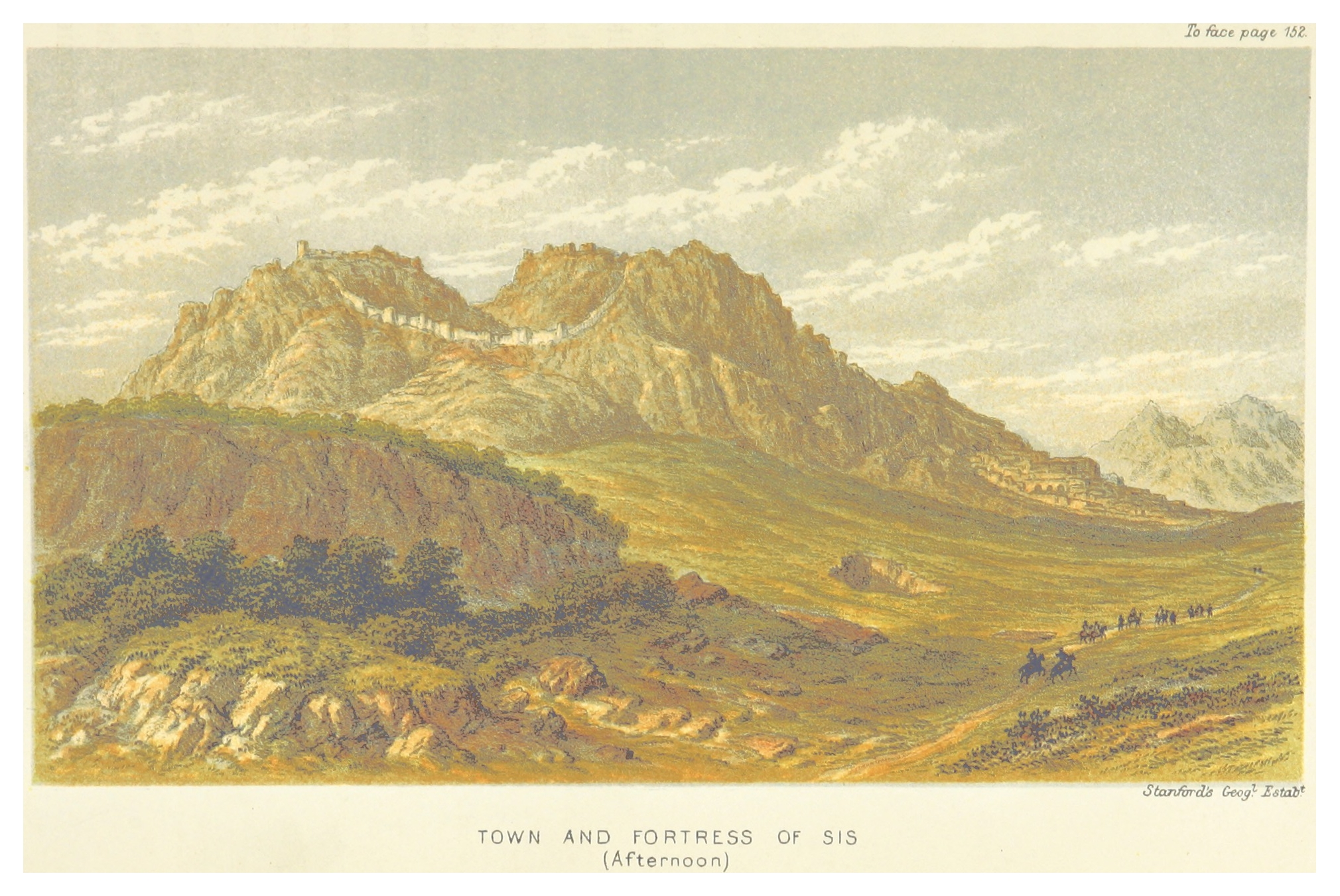
Panorama view of town and fortress (c.1870)

In 704, Sis was besieged by the Arabs, but relieved by the Byzantines. The Abbasid caliph al-Mutawakkil took it and refortified it, but it soon returned to Byzantine hands. It was rebuilt in 1186 by Leo II, king of the Armenian Kingdom of Cilicia, one of the Rupenide dynasty who made the city the capital of his Kingdom (from 1186 until 1375). During the Crusade the catholicate returned to Sis in 1294, and remained there 150 years.

In 1266 Sis, the capital of the Armenian Kingdom of Cilicia, was captured and damaged by the Egyptian Mamluks led by Baibars. al-Said Barakah sent Qalawun to attack the city in 1277, but in 1375, Sis was taken and demolished by the Ramadanids, under the flag of the Mamluke Sultan of Egypt. The town never recovered its prosperity, not even when it passed into the power of the Ottomans in 1516.

=== Ecclesiastical history ===
Sis had an important place in ecclesiastical history both the Armenian Apostolic Church and as a Roman Catholic titular see. It is first mentioned in Theodoret's life of St. Simeon Stylites.

In the Middle Ages, Sis was the religious center of Christian Armenians, until the Armenians moved the seat of Catholicos back to Vagharshapat (Echmiadzin), in Armenia. Lequien (II, 899) gives the names of several bishops of Sis, before and after Gregory IX.

Even prior to the Armenian Kingdom of Cilicia, Sis was an episcopal see and several names of bishops and patriarchs can be found in the literature:

- Alexander, later Bishop of Jerusalem and founder of the famous library of the Holy Sepulchre in the third century
- Nicetas, present at the First Council of Nicaea in 325
- John, who lived in 451;
- Andrew in the sixth century
- George (681)
- Eustratus, Patriarch of Antioch about 868

In 1441, Sis having fallen from its high estate, the Armenian clergy proposed to remove the see, and on the refusal of the Catholicos of the day, Gregory IX, installed a rival, namely Kirakos I Virapetsi (Kirakos of Armenia) at Echmiadzin, who, as soon as Selim I had conquered Greater Armenia, became the more widely accepted of the two by the Armenian church in the Ottoman Empire.

The Catholicos of Sis (of the Holy See of Cilicia) maintained himself nevertheless, with under his jurisdiction several bishops, numerous villages and convents, and was supported in his views by the Catholic Pope up to the middle of the 19th century, when the patriarch Nerses, declaring finally for Echmiadzin, carried the government with him. In 1885, Sis tried to declare Echmiadzin schismatic, and in 1895 its clergy took it on themselves to elect a Catholicos; but the Porte annulled the election, and only allowed it six years later upon Sis renouncing its pretensions to independence. That Catholicos had the right to prepare the sacred myron (oil) and to preside over a synod, but was in fact not more than a metropolitan, and regarded by many Armenians as schismatic.

=== Ottoman period ===
In the Ottoman period, Kozan was in the sanjak of Adana, and the seat of the kaza of Kozan. Ottoman archives show that Devşirme system was implemented in Kozan. However, there is evidence that the locals resisted the practise. In 1564, for example, villagers from Sis came to the Ottoman capital Istanbul and kidnapped their children back. From 1689 to 1865, the region was under the control of Kozanoğulları, a family of feudal lords. While there are various theories about their history and origin, they claimed descent from Turkmen tribes, and Ahmed Cevdet Pasha wrote that they were descended from the Arık tribe of Warsaks.

=== Modern ===
At the turn of the twentieth century, the town's population was 8,000, about 5,600 of which were Armenians. They were all deported during the course of the Armenian genocide. Kozan was occupied by France between March 8, 1919 - June 2, 1920 during the Turkish War of Independence. After Turkey was declared a republic, Kozan was a province, compromising the districts of Kozan, Kadirli, Feke and Saimbeyli between 1923 and 1926.

== Composition ==
There are 103 neighbourhoods in Kozan District:

- Acarmantaş
- Ağlıboğaz
- Akarca
- Akçalıuşağı
- Akdam
- Akkaya
- Alapınar
- Andıl
- Arslanlı
- Arslanpaşa
- Aydın
- Ayşehoca
- Bağlar
- Bağözü
- Bağtepe
- Boztahta
- Bucakköy
- Bulduklu
- Çamdere
- Çamlarca
- Çanaklı
- Çandık
- Çelenuşağı
- Çobanpınarı
- Çokak
- Çukurören
- Çulluuşağı
- Cumhuriyet
- Çürüklü
- Damyeri
- Dikilitaş
- Dilekkaya
- Doğanalanı
- Duraluşağı
- Durmuşlu
- Düzağaç
- Enizçakırı
- Ergenuşağı
- Eskikabasakal
- Eskimantaş
- Faydalı
- Ferhatlı
- Gazi
- Gedikli
- Gökçeyol
- Gökgöz
- Görbeyaz
- Güneri
- Hacıbeyli
- Hacımirzalı
- Hacıuşağı
- Hamamköy
- İdemköy
- Ilıcaköy
- Işıkkaya
- Işıklı
- Kabaktepe
- Kahveli
- Kalkumaç
- Kapıkaya
- Karabucak
- Karacaoğlan
- Karacaören
- Karahamzalı
- Karanebili
- Kemer
- Kıbrıslar
- Kızıllar
- Kızlarsekisi
- Köseli
- Kuytucak
- Kuyubeli
- Kuyuluk
- Mahmutlu
- Mahyalar
- Marankeçili
- Minnetli
- Orçan
- Örendere
- Oruçlu
- Özbaşı
- Pekmezci
- Postkabasakal
- Salmanlı
- Şerifli
- Şevkiye
- Taş
- Tavşantepe
- Tepecikören
- Tufanlı
- Tufanpaşa
- Turgutlu
- Türkeli
- Turunçlu
- Varsaklar
- Velicanlı
- Yanalerik
- Yarımoğlu
- Yassıçalı
- Yeniköy
- Yukarıkeçili
- Yüksekören
- Zerdali

== Kozan today ==
Today Kozan is a city surrounded by vineyards, gardens and groves of cypress, sycamore fig, orange and lemon trees. In summer the great heat (40 plus degrees Celsius or 104 plus degrees Fahrenheit) compels the inhabitants to desert Kozan, retreating to cool off in the wooded higher ground.

== Climate ==
Kozan has a hot-summer Mediterranean climate (Köppen climate classification Csa). Kozan has mild, rainy winters and very hot, muggy and dry summers. The highest recorded temperature was on 13 August 2023 at 48.4 °C (119.1 °F).

Climate data for Kozan (1991–2020)
Month	Jan	Feb	Mar	Apr	May	Jun	Jul	Aug	Sep	Oct	Nov	Dec	Year
Mean daily maximum °C (°F)	14.6 (58.3)	16.0 (60.8)	19.5 (67.1)	23.8 (74.8)	28.8 (83.8)	33.1 (91.6)	35.8 (96.4)	36.1 (97.0)	33.5 (92.3)	29.1 (84.4)	22.2 (72.0)	16.5 (61.7)	25.8 (78.4)
Daily mean °C (°F)	10.1 (50.2)	11.2 (52.2)	14.2 (57.6)	17.9 (64.2)	22.2 (72.0)	26.1 (79.0)	28.8 (83.8)	29.2 (84.6)	26.7 (80.1)	22.9 (73.2)	16.7 (62.1)	11.9 (53.4)	19.9 (67.8)
Mean daily minimum °C (°F)	6.9 (44.4)	7.4 (45.3)	9.9 (49.8)	12.9 (55.2)	16.8 (62.2)	20.2 (68.4)	23.2 (73.8)	23.7 (74.7)	21.2 (70.2)	18.3 (64.9)	12.8 (55.0)	8.5 (47.3)	15.2 (59.4)
Average precipitation mm (inches)	99.8 (3.93)	81.62 (3.21)	91.89 (3.62)	80.61 (3.17)	84.78 (3.34)	46.94 (1.85)	24.33 (0.96)	22.98 (0.90)	31.99 (1.26)	43.63 (1.72)	74.26 (2.92)	112.22 (4.42)	795.05 (31.30)
Average precipitation days (≥ 1.0 mm)	7.8	7.5	8.3	8.2	7.0	4.8	2.7	2.5	3.3	4.8	4.8	8.2	69.9
Average relative humidity (%)	56.2	56.5	58.7	62.4	62.3	62.0	63.8	63.6	57.6	51.0	49.9	56.8	58.4
Source: NOAA

== Notable natives ==
- Nerses Balients (fl. early 14th century), Armenian ecclesiastical figure, politician, historian
- Grigor Khul (12th century), Armenian musician
- Manase Sevak (1897–1967), Armenian biochemist and public figure, member of New York Academy of Sciences and Soviet Armenia's Academy of Sciences
- Grigor Kyulyan (1912–1974), Armenian writer
- İmren Aykut (born 1940), Turkish female economist, trade unionist, politician and former government minister

== Things to see ==
Today ruins of churches, convents, castles and palaces may be seen on all sides. The lofty castle and the monastery and church built by Leo II, and containing the coronation chair of the kings of Cilician Armenia, were still noteworthy up until the Armenian genocide.

== Gallery ==
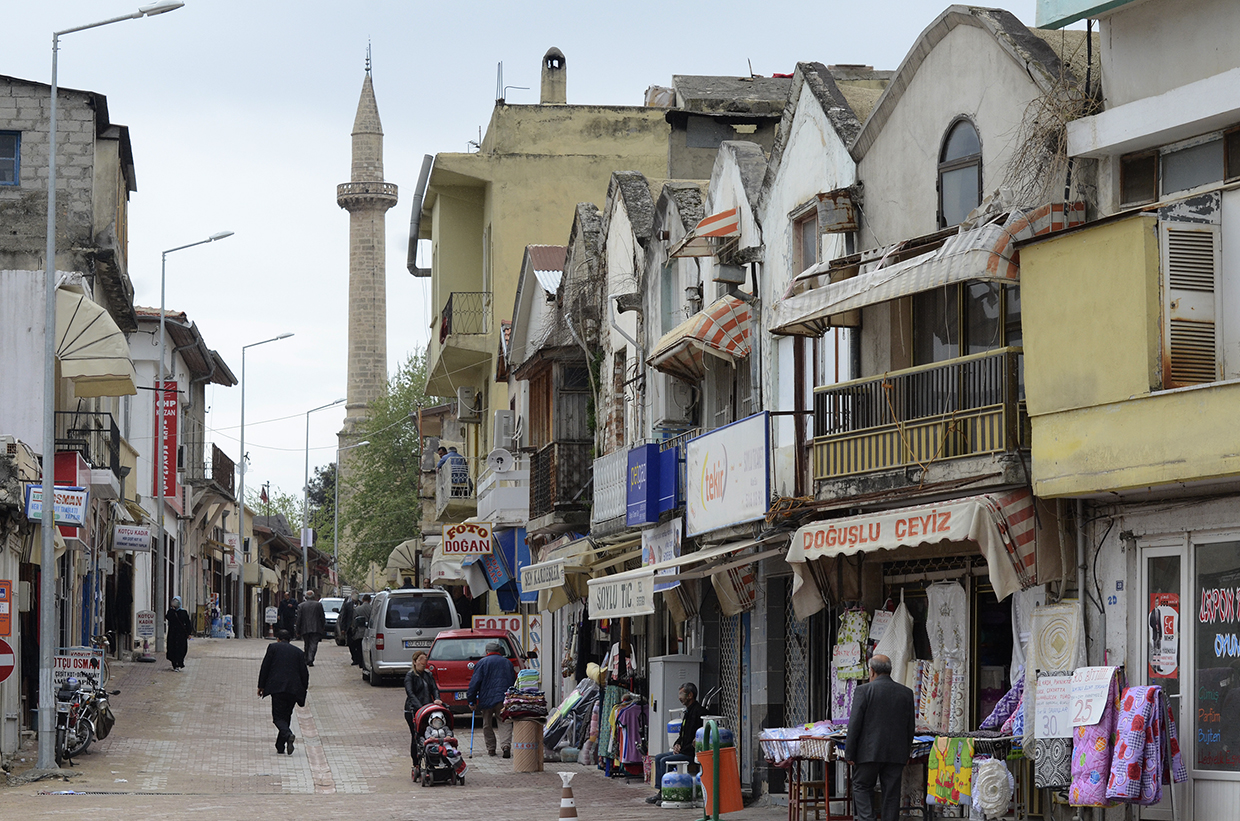
Street view of Kozan

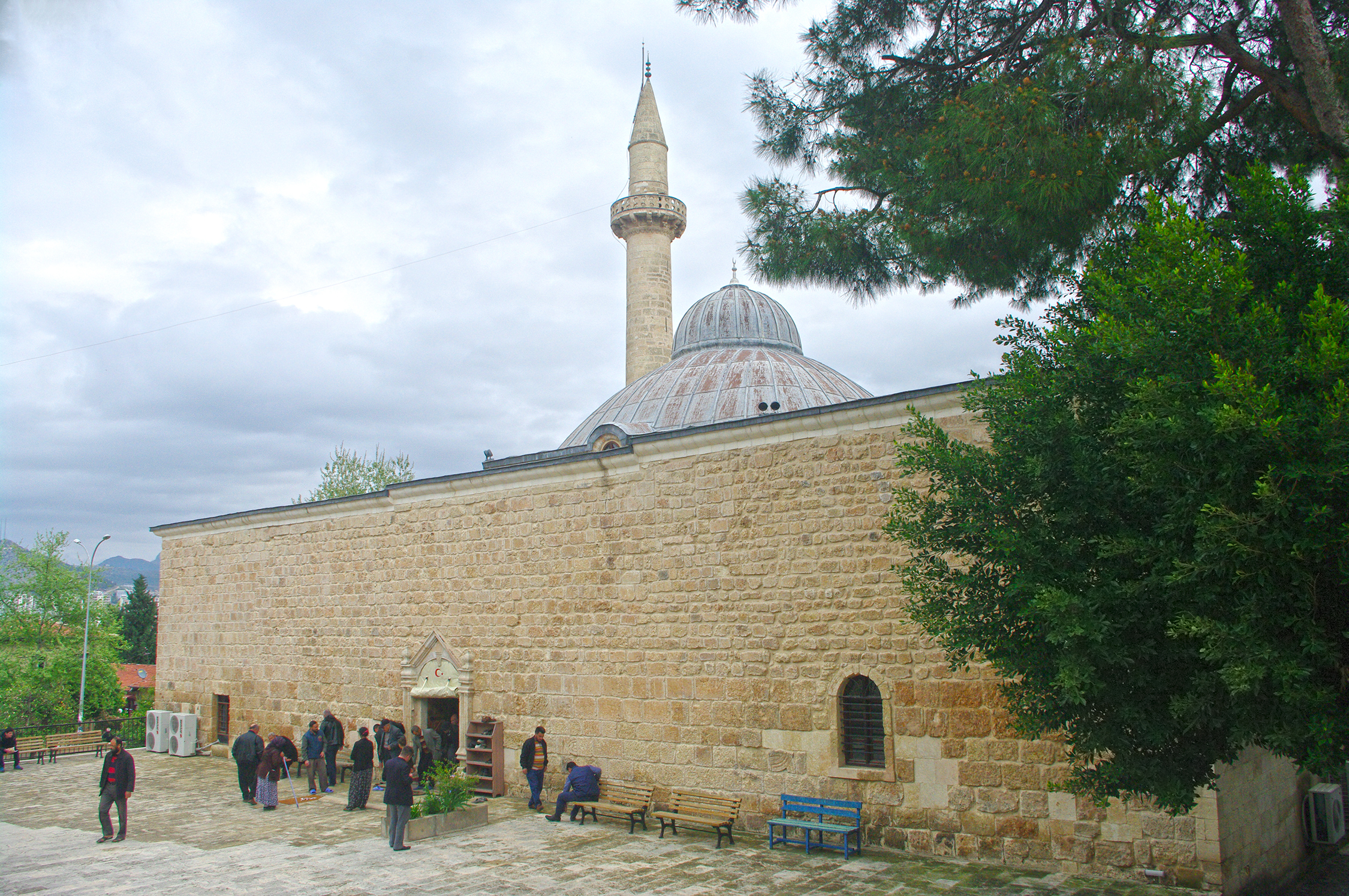
Grand Mosque of Kozan

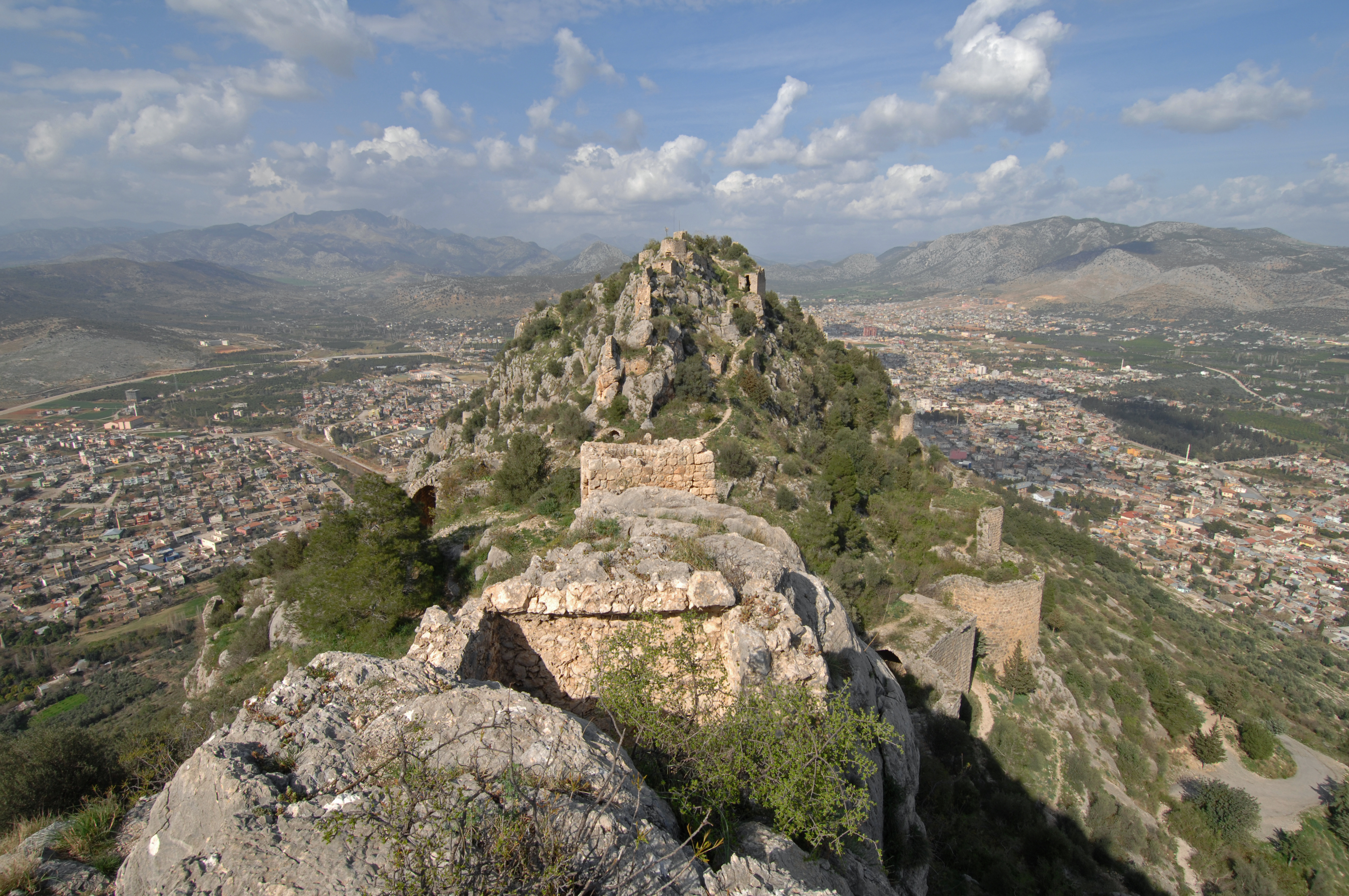
Kozan Castle

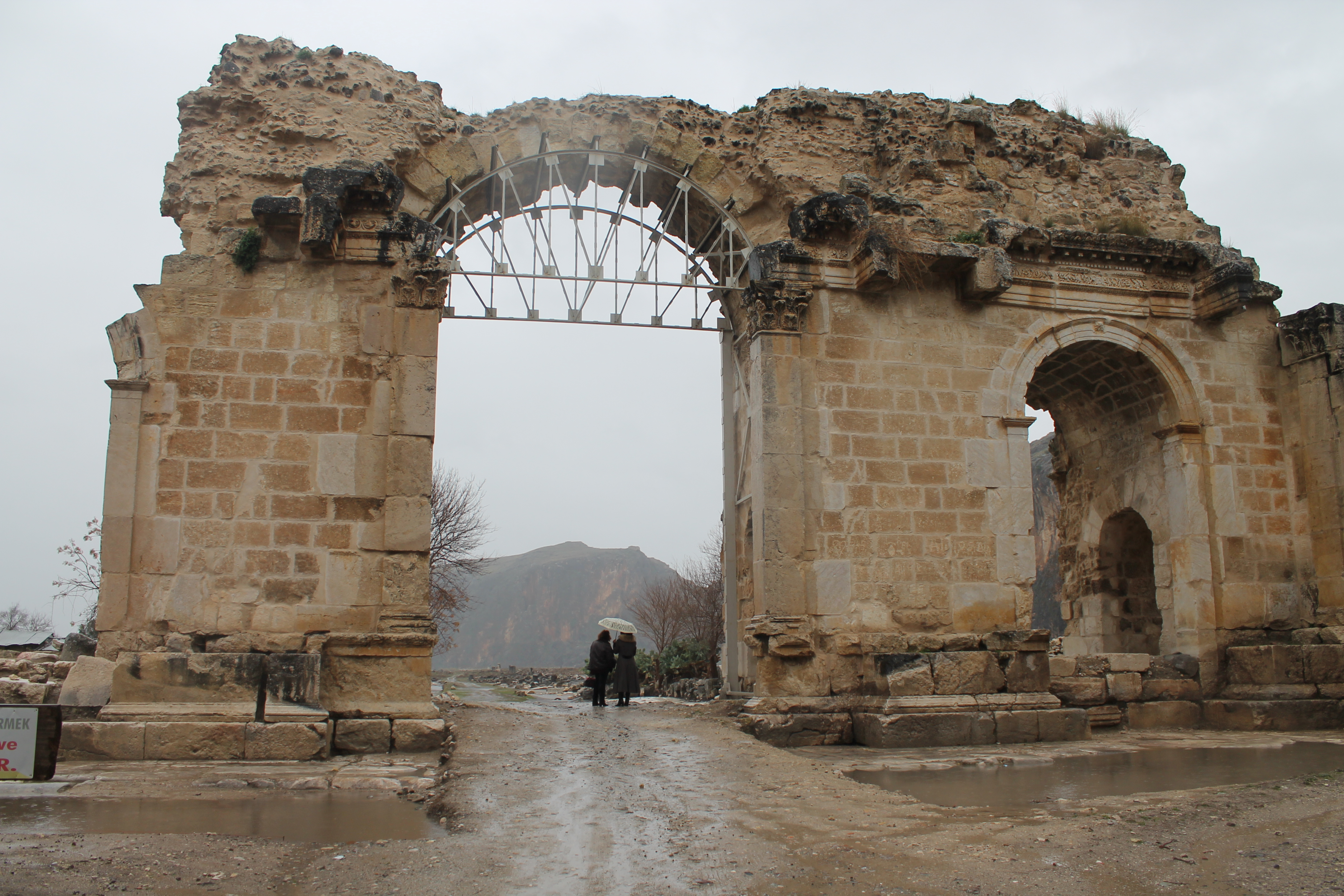
Anavarza Castle

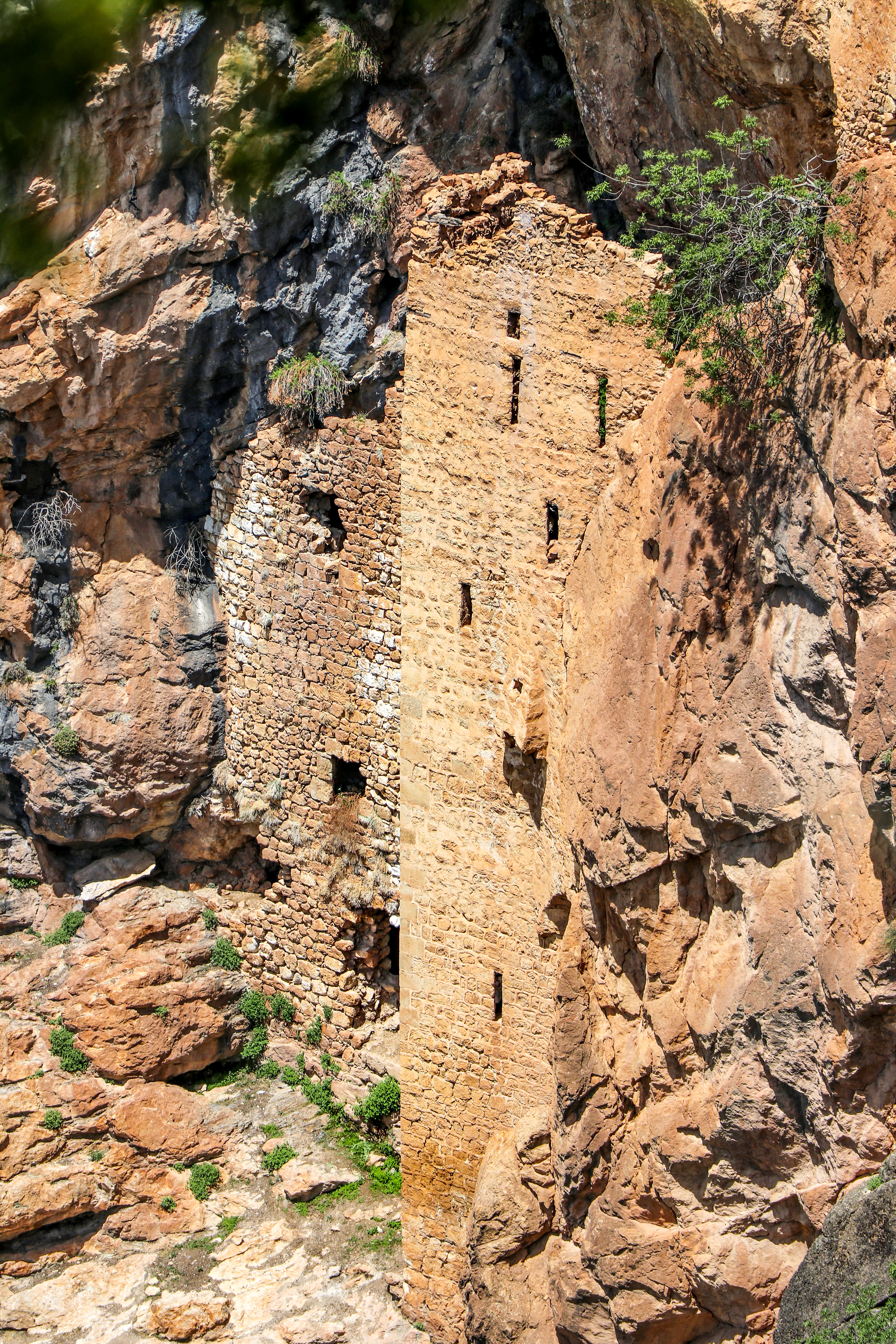
Kozan Velicanlı District Sin Monastery

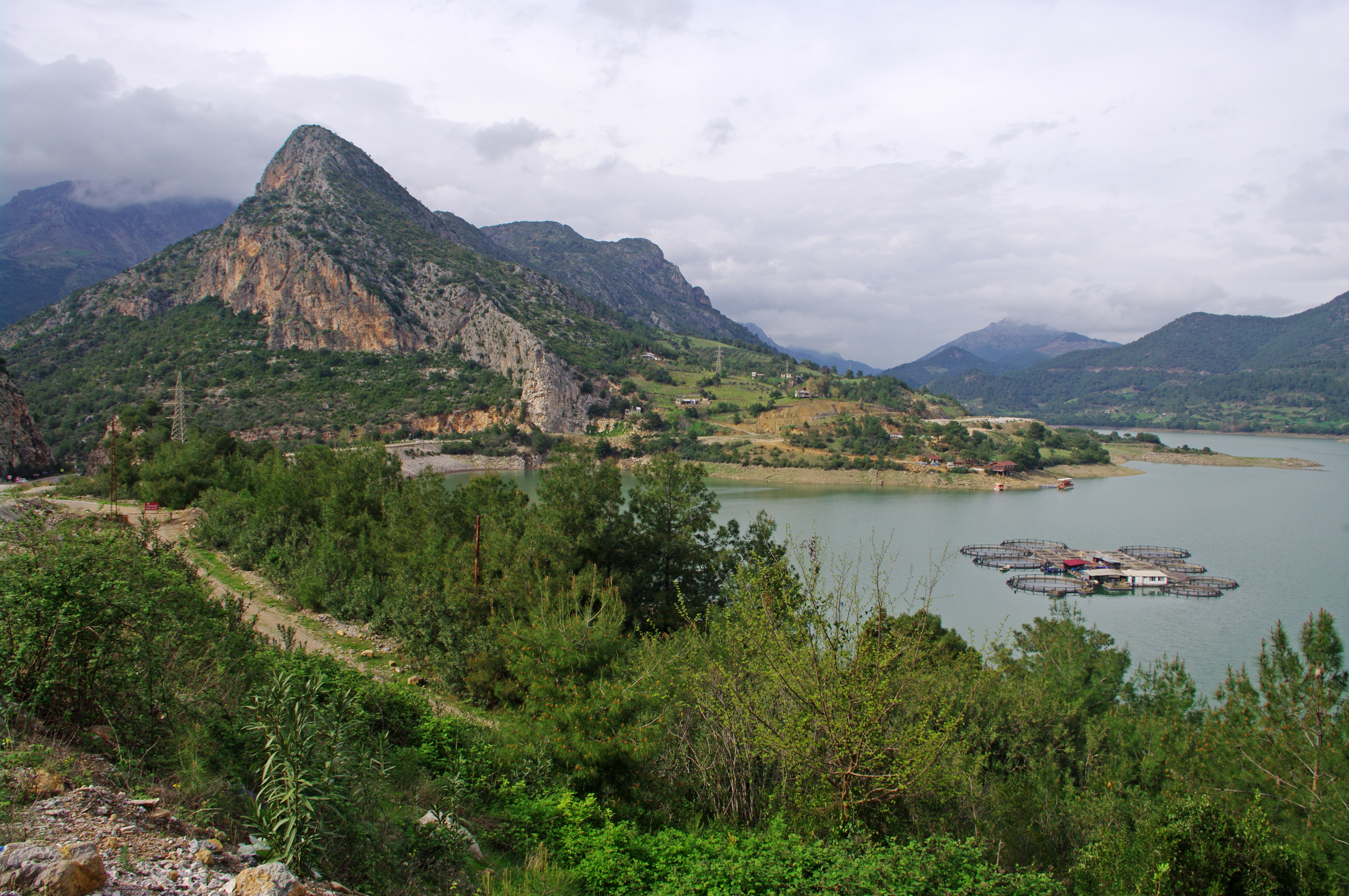
Kozan Dam

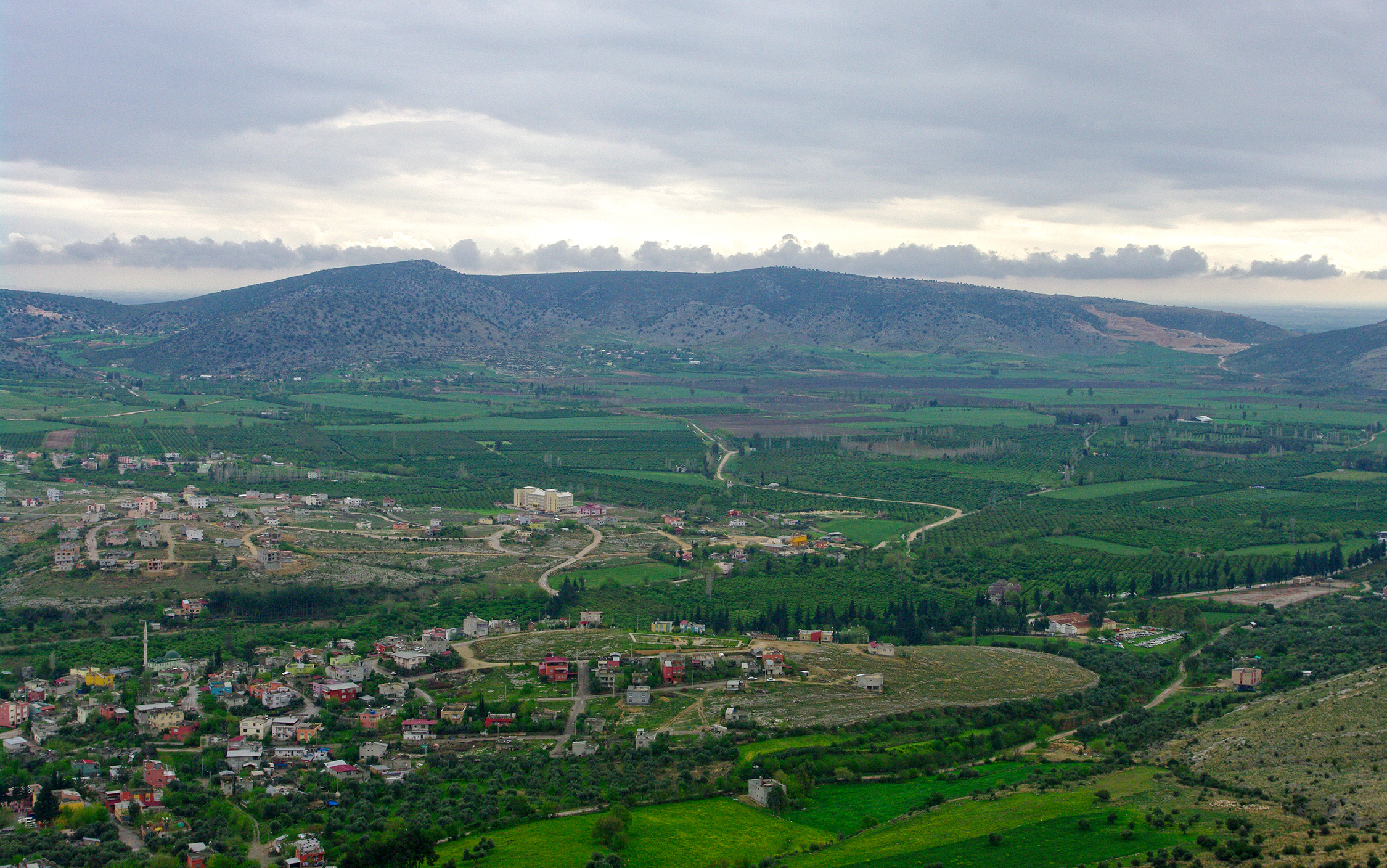
General view of Kozan

== See also ==
- Kozan Dam on the Kilgen River, 8 km (5 mi) north of Kozan

== Bibliography ==
- Gould, A.G. (2012). "Ḳōzān". In Bearman, P.; Bianquis, Th.; Bosworth, C.E.; van Donzel, E.; Heinrichs, W.P. (eds.). Encyclopaedia of Islam, Second Edition. E. J. Brill.
- Bearman, P.; Bianquis, Th.; Bosworth, C.E.; van Donzel, E.; Heinrichs, W.P., eds. (2012). "Ḳōzān-Og̲h̲ullari̇". Encyclopaedia of Islam, Second Edition. E. J. Brill.
