= Köseli, Kozan =

Köseli
- Neighbourhood
- Location in Turkey
- Coordinates: 37°31′11″N 35°45′33″E
- Country: Turkey
- Province: Adana
- District: Kozan
- Population (2022): 276
- Time zone: UTC+3 (TRT)

Köseli is a neighbourhood in the municipality and district of Kozan, Adana Province, Turkey. Its population is 276 (2022).
