= Düzağaç, Kozan =

Düzağaç
- Neighbourhood
- Location in Turkey
- Coordinates: 37°34′49″N 35°49′09″E
- Country: Turkey
- Province: Adana
- District: Kozan
- Population (2022): 338
- Time zone: UTC+3 (TRT)

Düzağaç is a neighbourhood in the municipality and district of Kozan, Adana Province, Turkey. Its population is 338 (2022).
