= Akkaya, Kozan =

Akkaya
- Neighbourhood
- Location in Turkey
- Coordinates: 37°47′46″N 35°38′25″E
- Country: Turkey
- Province: Adana
- District: Kozan
- Population (2022): 134
- Time zone: UTC+3 (TRT)

Akkaya is a neighbourhood in the municipality and district of Kozan, Adana Province, Turkey. Its population is 134 (2022).
