= Mahyalar, Kozan =

Mahyalar
- Neighbourhood
- Location in Turkey
- Coordinates: 37°40′N 35°55′E
- Country: Turkey
- Province: Adana
- District: Kozan
- Population (2022): 225
- Time zone: UTC+3 (TRT)

Mahyalar is a neighbourhood in the municipality and district of Kozan, Adana Province, Turkey. Its population is 225 (2022). The village inhabited by Turkmens of the Varsak tribe.
