= Yeniköy, Kozan =

Yeniköy
- Neighbourhood
- Location in Turkey
- Coordinates: 37°29′03″N 35°43′10″E
- Country: Turkey
- Province: Adana
- District: Kozan
- Population (2022): 323
- Time zone: UTC+3 (TRT)

Yeniköy is a neighbourhood in the municipality and district of Kozan, Adana Province, Turkey. Its population is 323 (2022).
