= Oruçlu, Kozan =

Oruçlu
- Neighbourhood
- Location in Turkey
- Coordinates: 37°30′00″N 35°46′17″E
- Country: Turkey
- Province: Adana
- District: Kozan
- Population (2022): 355
- Time zone: UTC+3 (TRT)

Oruçlu is a neighbourhood in the municipality and district of Kozan, Adana Province, Turkey. Its population is 355 (2022).
