= Hacımirzalı, Kozan =

Hacımirzalı
- Neighbourhood
- Location in Turkey
- Coordinates: 37°28′03″N 35°48′38″E
- Country: Turkey
- Province: Adana
- District: Kozan
- Population (2022): 1,220
- Time zone: UTC+3 (TRT)

Hacımirzalı is a neighbourhood in the municipality and district of Kozan, Adana Province, Turkey. Its population is 1,220 (2022).
