= Boztahta, Kozan =

Boztahta
- Neighbourhood
- Location in Turkey
- Coordinates: 37°38′09″N 35°59′57″E
- Country: Turkey
- Province: Adana
- District: Kozan
- Population (2022): 587
- Time zone: UTC+3 (TRT)

Boztahta is a neighbourhood in the municipality and district of Kozan, Adana Province, Turkey. Its population is 587 (2022).
