= Gökçeyol, Kozan =

Gökçeyol
- Neighbourhood
- Location in Turkey
- Coordinates: 37°17′39″N 35°48′27″E
- Country: Turkey
- Province: Adana
- District: Kozan
- Population (2022): 19
- Time zone: UTC+3 (TRT)

Gökçeyol is a neighbourhood in the municipality and district of Kozan, Adana Province, Turkey. Its population is 19 (2022).
