= Işıkkaya, Kozan =

Işıkkaya
- Neighbourhood
- Location in Turkey
- Coordinates: 37°40′59″N 35°32′53″E
- Country: Turkey
- Province: Adana
- District: Kozan
- Population (2022): 151
- Time zone: UTC+3 (TRT)

Işıkkaya is a neighbourhood in the municipality and district of Kozan, Adana Province, Turkey. Its population is 151 (2022). The village inhabited by Turkmens of the Varsak tribe.
