= Çamdere, Kozan =

Çamdere
- Neighbourhood
- Location in Turkey
- Coordinates: 37°39′14″N 35°49′36″E
- Country: Turkey
- Province: Adana
- District: Kozan
- Population (2022): 323
- Time zone: UTC+3 (TRT)

Çamdere is a neighbourhood in the municipality and district of Kozan, Adana Province, Turkey. Its population is 323 (2022). The village inhabited by Turkmens of the Varsak tribe.
