= Yassıçalı, Kozan =

Yassıçalı
- Neighbourhood
- Location in Turkey
- Coordinates: 37°21′32″N 35°49′53″E
- Country: Turkey
- Province: Adana
- District: Kozan
- Population (2022): 815
- Time zone: UTC+3 (TRT)

Yassıçalı is a neighbourhood in the municipality and district of Kozan, Adana Province, Turkey. Its population is 815 (2022).
