= Duraluşağı, Kozan =

Duraluşağı
- Neighbourhood
- Location in Turkey
- Coordinates: 37°29′17″N 35°45′00″E
- Country: Turkey
- Province: Adana
- District: Kozan
- Population (2022): 117
- Time zone: UTC+3 (TRT)

Duraluşağı is a neighbourhood in the municipality and district of Kozan, Adana Province, Turkey. Its population is 117 (2022).
