= Bağözü, Kozan =

Bağözü
- Neighbourhood
- Location in Turkey
- Coordinates: 37°33′14″N 35°44′22″E
- Country: Turkey
- Province: Adana
- District: Kozan
- Population (2022): 232
- Time zone: UTC+3 (TRT)

Bağözü is a neighbourhood in the municipality and district of Kozan, Adana Province, Turkey. Its population is 232 (2022).
