= Gazi, Kozan =

Gazi
- Neighbourhood
- Location in Turkey
- Coordinates: 37.2958°N 35.8524°E
- Country: Turkey
- Province: Adana
- District: Kozan
- Population (2022): 1,283
- Time zone: UTC+3 (TRT)

Gazi (formerly: Gaziköy) is a neighbourhood of the municipality and district of Kozan, Adana Province, Turkey. Its population is 1,283 (2022). Before the 2013 reorganisation, it was a town (belde).
