= Çokak, Kozan =

Çokak
- Neighbourhood
- Location in Turkey
- Coordinates: 37°20′10″N 35°53′22″E
- Country: Turkey
- Province: Adana
- District: Kozan
- Population (2022): 209
- Time zone: UTC+3 (TRT)

Çokak is a neighbourhood in the municipality and district of Kozan, Adana Province, Turkey. Its population is 209 (2022).
