= Alapınar, Kozan =

Alapınar
- Neighbourhood
- Location in Turkey
- Coordinates: 37°20′18″N 35°50′54″E
- Country: Turkey
- Province: Adana
- District: Kozan
- Population (2022): 115
- Time zone: UTC+3 (TRT)

Alapınar is a neighbourhood in the municipality and district of Kozan, Adana Province, Turkey. Its population is 115 (2022).
