= Yılankale =

Castle ruin in Ceyhan, Adana, Turkey

- Adana Province, Turkey
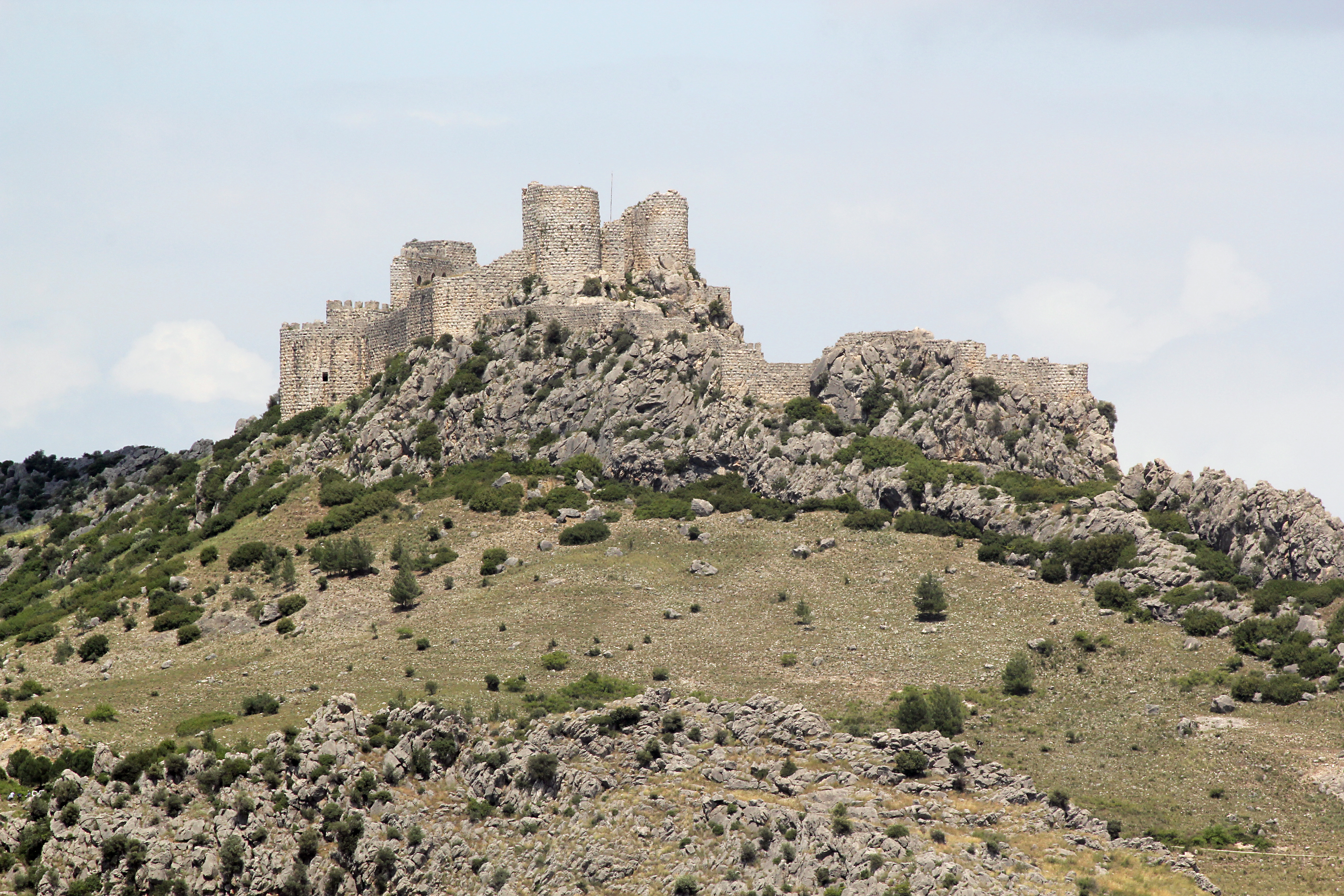
- Yılankale

Site information
- Open to the public: Yes
- Condition: Ruins

Location
- Location of Yılankale within Turkey
- Coordinates: 37.014444°N 35.747778°E

Site history
- Built: 13th century
- Built by: Leo (Levon) I of the Armenian Kingdom of Cilicia

Yılankale (lit. 'snake castle' in Turkish) is a late 12th–13th century Armenian castle in Adana Province of Turkey. It is known in Armenian as Levonkla (Լևոնկլա "Levon's fortress") after its possible founder—King Leo (Levon) I the Magnificent (r. 1198/9–1219) of the Armenian Kingdom of Cilicia. Medieval Armenian names attached to the site are Kovara and Vaner.

A hill castle, Yılankale is located on a rocky hill overlooking the east bank of the Ceyhan River, and the Bronze and Iron Age site of Sirkeli Höyük, six kilometers west of the town of Ceyhan. The building is locally known as the home of Shahmaran, a mythical creature half woman and half snake.

== Architecture ==
The walls, as well as the numerous horseshoe-shaped towers and vaulted chambers, are built with beautifully cut rusticated masonry and are carefully adapted to the coiling outcrop of limestone to create three baileys. The archaeological and historical assessment of this castle published in 1987 (with a scaled plan) describes each unit in detail. In the upper bailey is an Armenian chapel with its apse and north wall preserved. The assumption that the relief of a seated king with two rampant lions in the gatehouse door depicts King Levon I (confirming the conclusion that he was the castle's early 13th-c. founder), was convincingly challenged by both iconographic and archaeological evidence, which shows that the relief portrays either Kings Het'um I (1226–70) or Het'um II (1289–1307). The castle was abandoned during the reign of the Ramadanids in the mid-14th century.

It has been described as the "most perfectly preserved Armenian castle" of the Çukurova (Cilicia) region. The castle is open to the public and was renovated in summer of 2014.

== History ==
In late 19th century, the inhabitants of Yılankale were Nogai immigrants from the Crimean War.

== Gallery ==
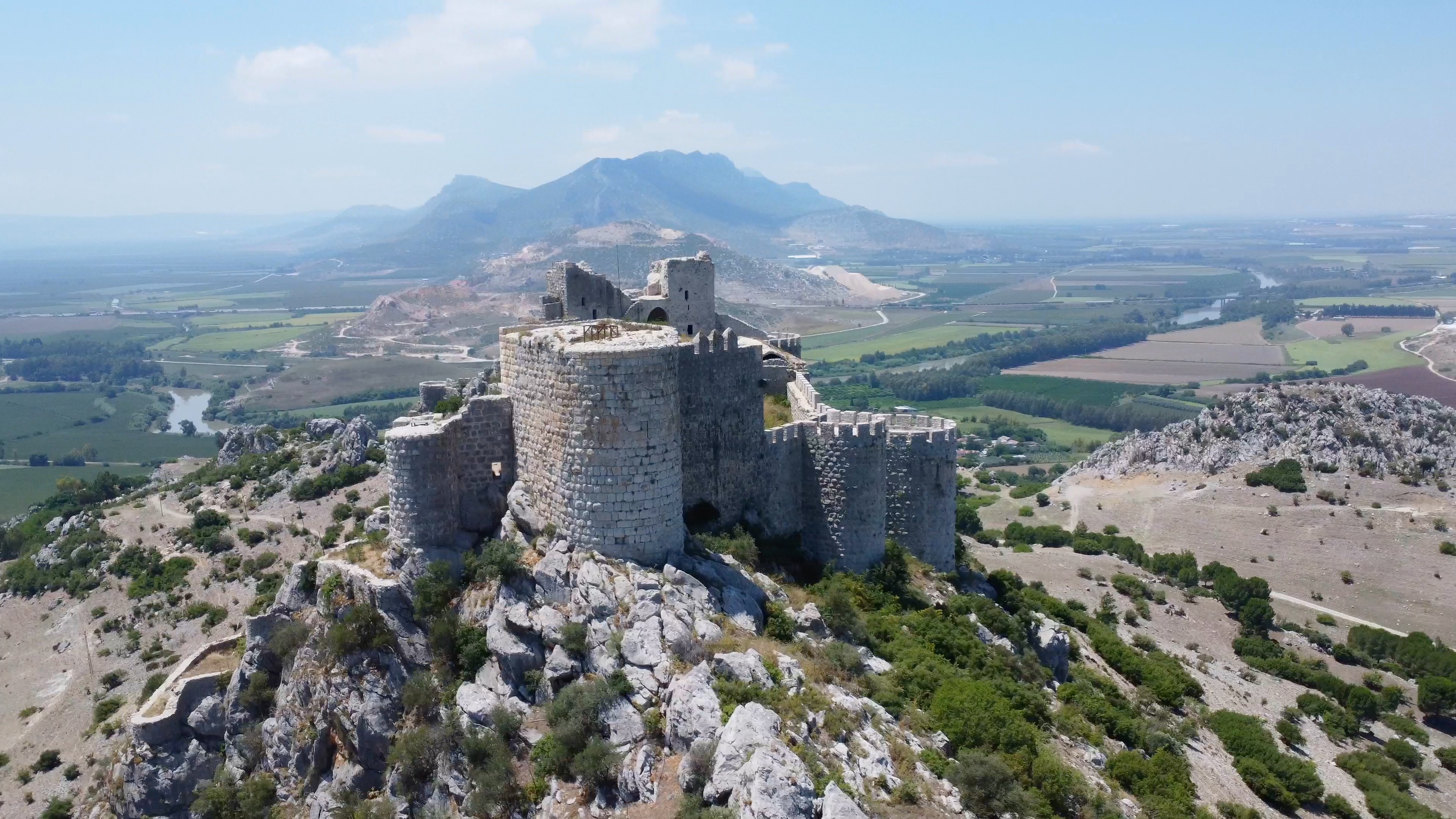
An aerial view of the castle

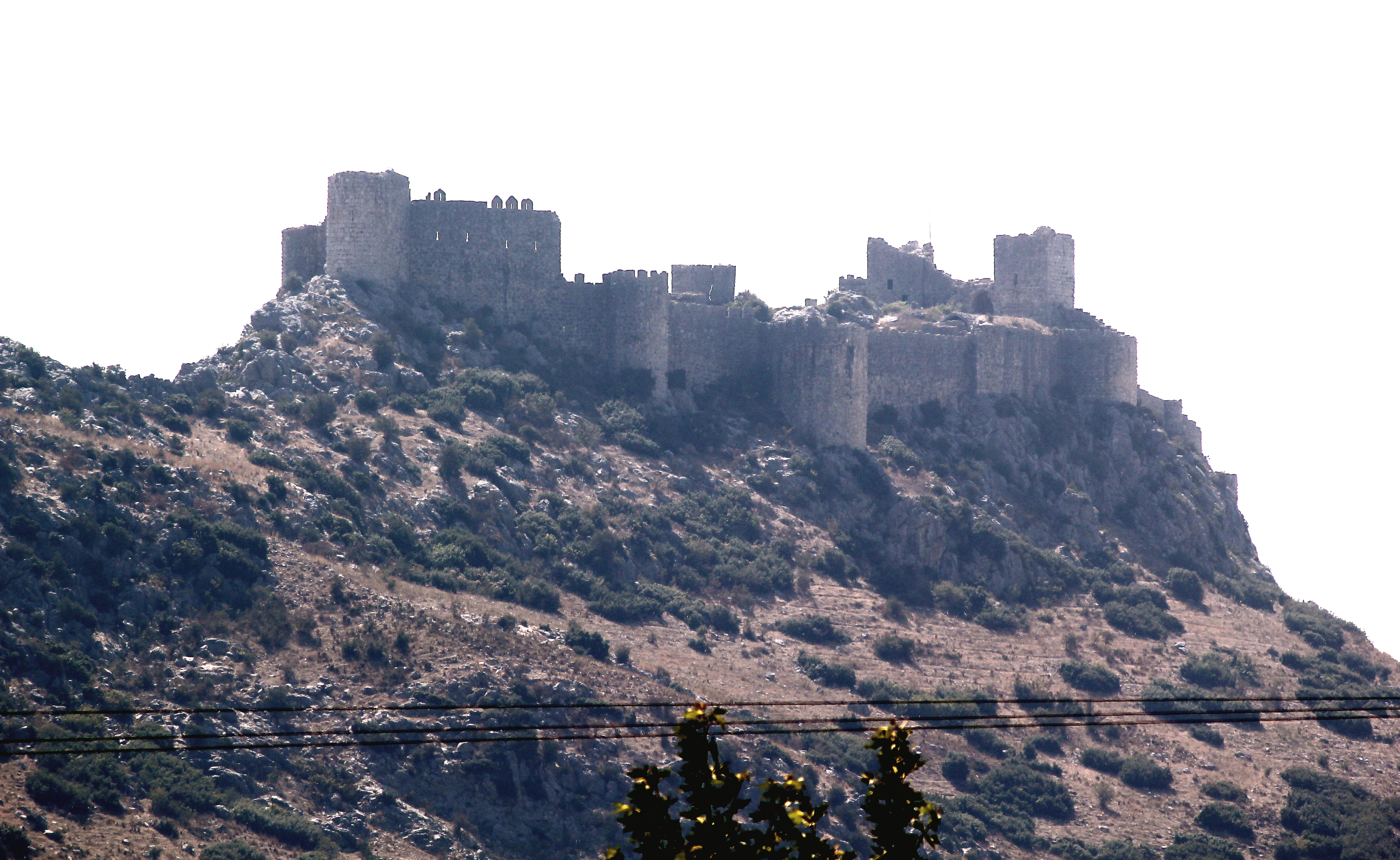

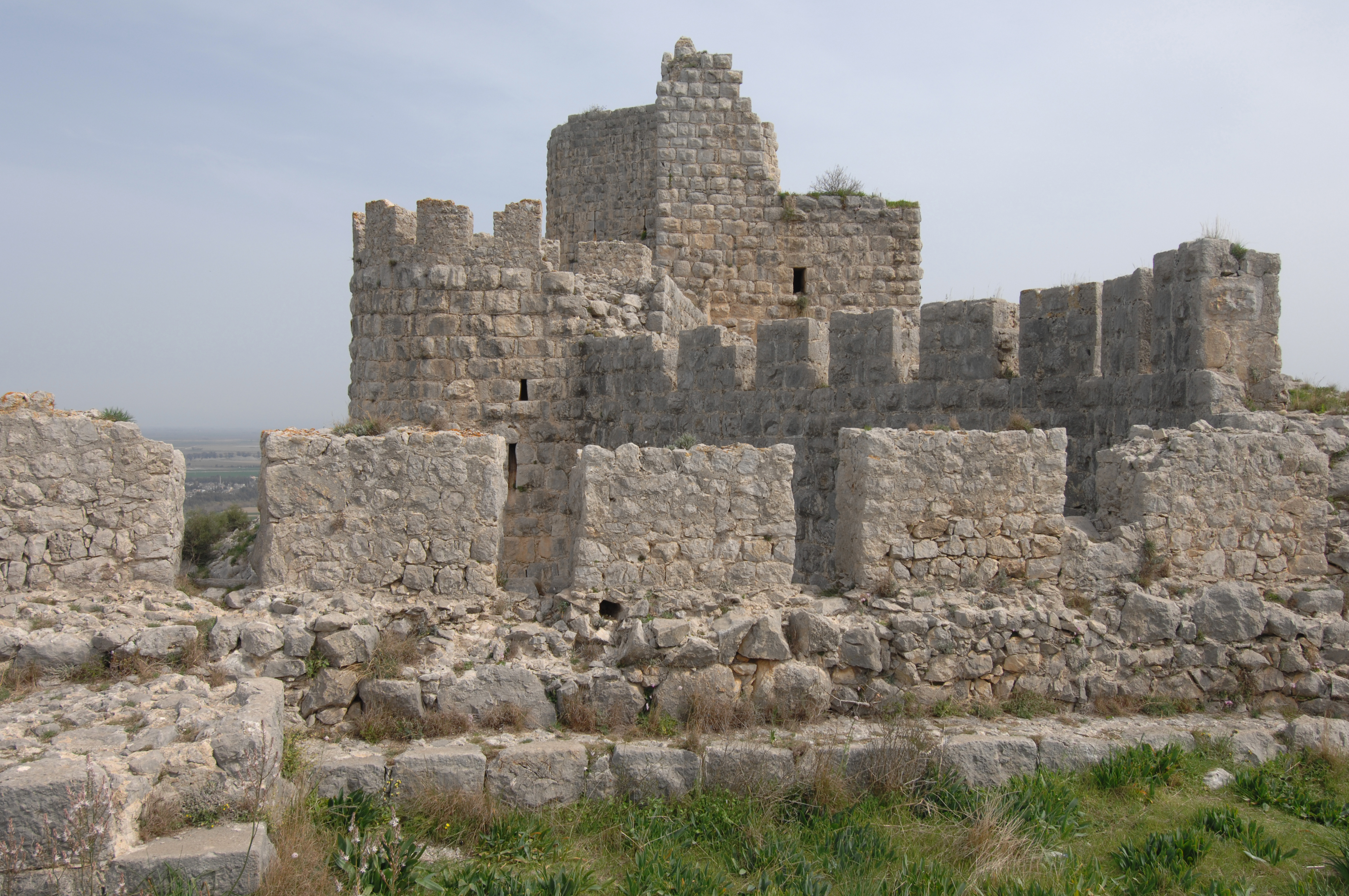

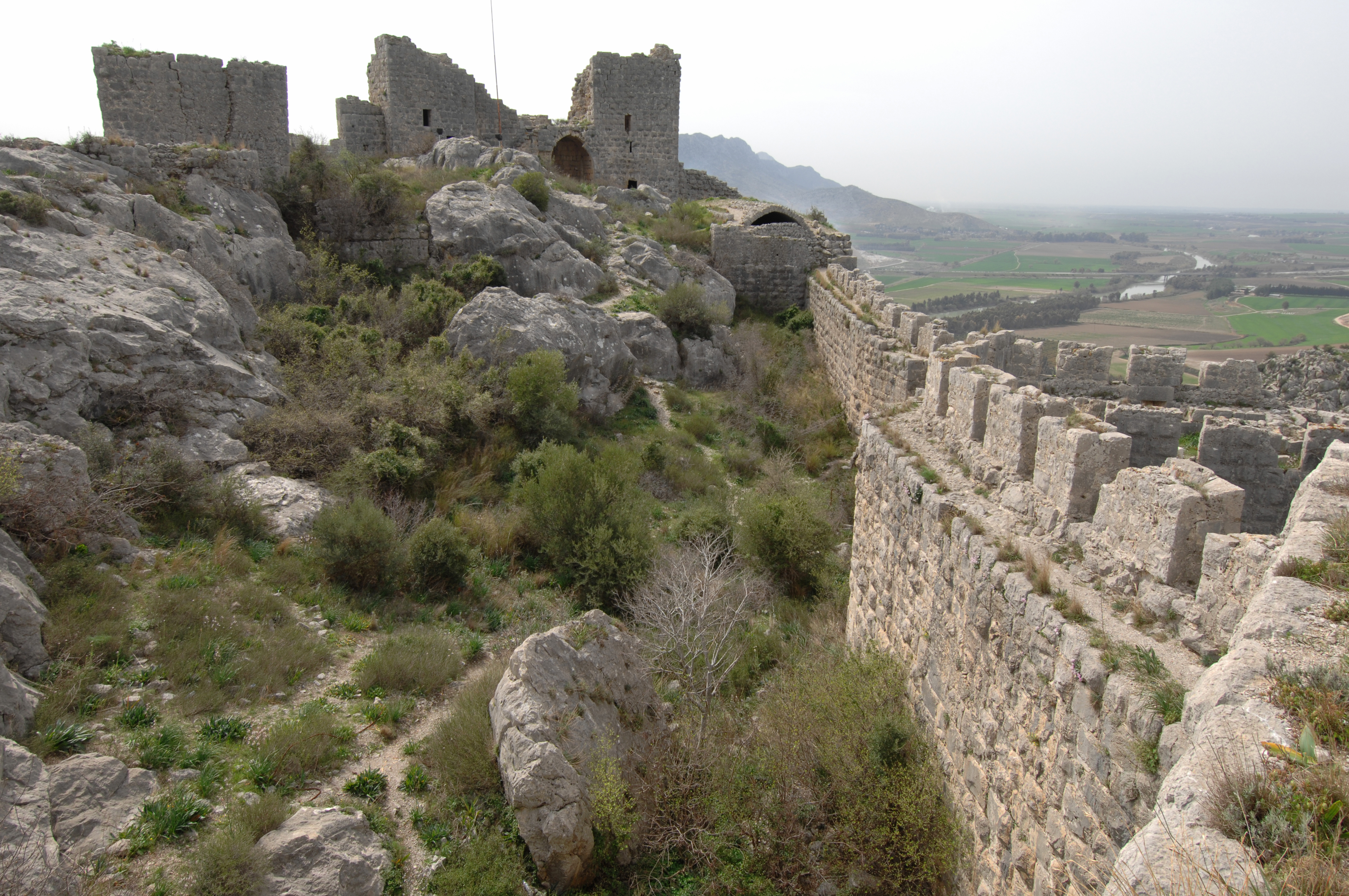

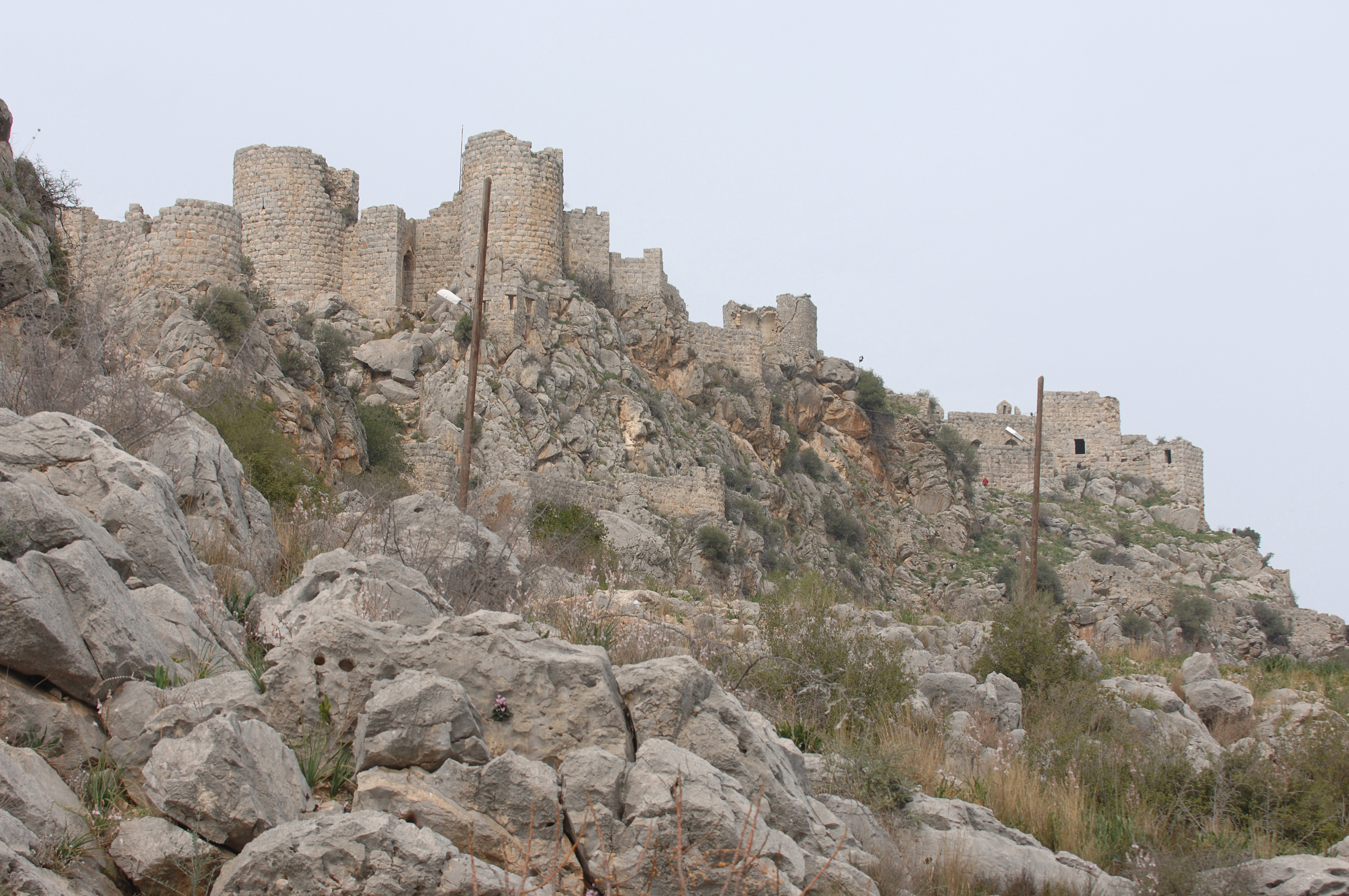

== See also ==
Comparable castles include:

- Servantikar
- Lampron
- Anavarza Castle
