= Dilekkaya, Kozan =

Dilekkaya
- Neighbourhood
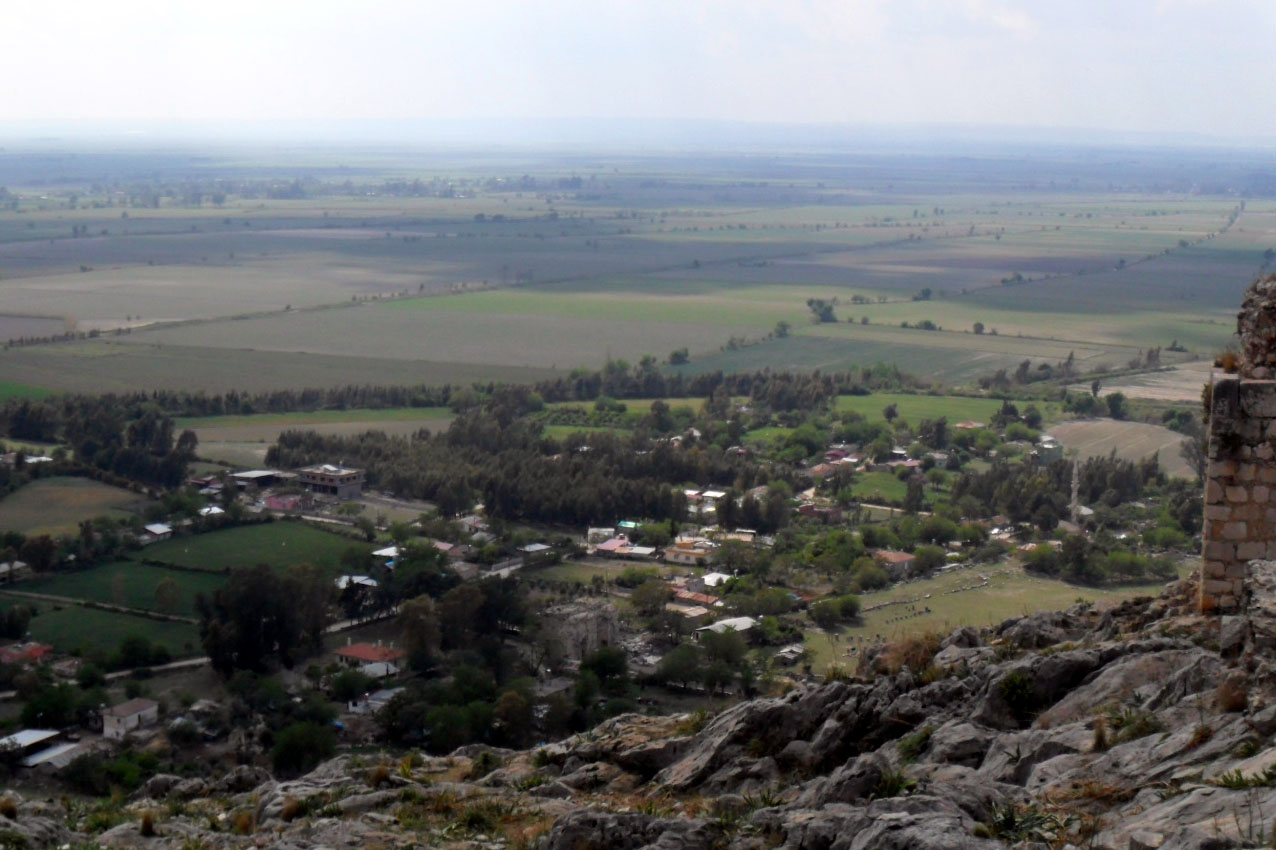

- Location within Turkey
- Coordinates: 37°15′00″N 35°53′41″E
- Country: Turkey
- Province: Adana
- District: Kozan
- Population (2022): 349
- Time zone: UTC+3 (TRT)

Dilekkaya is a neighbourhood in the municipality and district of Kozan, Adana Province, Turkey. Its population is 349 (2022). Dilekkaya lies next to the ruins of ancient Anazarbus.
