= Güneri, Kozan =

Güneri
- Neighbourhood
- Location in Turkey
- Coordinates: 37°27′N 35°46′E
- Country: Turkey
- Province: Adana
- District: Kozan
- Population (2022): 2,073
- Time zone: UTC+3 (TRT)

Güneri is a neighbourhood in the municipality and district of Kozan, Adana Province, Turkey. Its population is 2,073 (2022).
