= Bulduq =

Buldug
- Municipality
- Azerbaijani: Bulduq
- Location within Azerbaijan
- Coordinates: 40°04′07″N 48°37′46″E
- Country: Azerbaijan
- District: Sabirabad

Population
  - Total: 1,797
- Time zone: UTC+4 (AZT)
  - Summer (DST): UTC+5 (AZT)

Bulduq (Buldug) is a village and municipality in the Sabirabad District of Azerbaijan. It has a population of 1'797.

== Climate ==
During the year, there is little rainfall in Buldug. The average temperature is 17.3 °C and the average rainfall is 328 mm.
