= Turunçlu, Kozan =

Turunçlu
- Neighbourhood
- Location in Turkey
- Coordinates: 37°26′21″N 35°44′02″E
- Country: Turkey
- Province: Adana
- District: Kozan
- Population (2022): 361
- Time zone: UTC+3 (TRT)

Turunçlu is a neighbourhood in the municipality and district of Kozan, Adana Province, Turkey. Its population is 361 (2022).
