= Pekmezci, Kozan =

Pekmezci
- Neighbourhood
- Location in Turkey
- Coordinates: 37°21′20″N 35°51′34″E
- Country: Turkey
- Province: Adana
- District: Kozan
- Population (2022): 460
- Time zone: UTC+3 (TRT)

Pekmezci is a neighbourhood in the municipality and district of Kozan, Adana Province, Turkey. Its population is 460 (2022).
