= Acindynus (Carrhae) =

Ancient Byzantine governor

Acindynus was a Byzantine governor of Carrhae (Harran), active in the reign of Emperor Maurice (r. 582–602). He was accused of being a pagan and was executed. The main sources about him are Syriac chronicles, in particular the Chronicle of Michael the Syrian and the Chronicle of 1234. The source of both accounts was the lost chronicle of Dionysius Telmaharensis.

== Biography ==
Acindynus was reportedly a governor of Carrhae (Harran) in Osroene. The term used, "hegemon", typically implies a civil governor, but the civil governors of Osroene were usually stationed at Edessa. Acindynus was probably a military commander stationed in the secondary city.

The Syriac accounts agree that Emperor Maurice himself authorized Stephen, Bishop of Harran, to persecute the pagans of his area. During the persecution, the accused were given a choice between a forced conversion to Christianity and death. Acindynus was known to be a Christian, but his scribe/secretary Iyarios (elsewhere called Honorius) accused him of secretly practicing paganism.

Stephen proceeded to have Acindynus executed, either by impalement or crucifixion. The deceased governor was succeeded by Iyarios.

== Iyarios ==
Michael the Syrian offers some additional information on Iyarios. According to his account, Iyarios was an orphan abandoned by his parents. He believed the birthplace of the man to be in Armenia Prima (First Armenia). Iyarios was raised and educated in the vicinity of Nicopolis, trained to be a scribe.

== Interpretation ==
The events can be dated to circa 589. John Liebeschuetz connects the narrative to a wave of religious persecutions which started in 578. Emperor Justinian I (r. 527–565) had initiated the search for crypto-pagans among the ranks of the Christians. But the enforcement of his laws on the subject was "spasmodic". In other words, sudden bursts of activity in persecuting pagans alternated with periods where nobody was actively seeking suspects. In 578, the Byzantine authorities had received reports on an impending revolt of crypto-pagans in Baalbek. Theophilus, an official who had previously faced revolts by Jews and Samaritans, was tasked with locating said crypto-pagans. Suspects were arrested, interrogated under torture, and forced to name other "pagans". Soon, Theophilus had lists of names, including prominent citizens spread throughout the eastern provinces of the Byzantine Empire. The persecution spread to the rest of these provinces.

Theophilus himself had visited Edessa in the course of his investigations. He claimed to have interrupted a sacrifice to Zeus taking place within the city. He proceeded to arrest Anatolius and Theodore, respectively the provincial governor of Osroene and his second-in-command. They were transported first to Antioch for their interrogation and secondly to Constantinople for their trial. Liebeschuetz sees these activities as a regular "witch-hunt", where everyone is a suspect. He points out that many of the "pagans" executed were probably actual Christians.

Liebeschuetz and other modern historians point to the involvement of the Monophysites in these events. The last reign favorable to them was that of Emperor Anastasius I (r. 491–518). Since 518, they were seen as heretics, with "their churches and monasteries ... liable to be confiscated, and their bishops to be exiled and imprisoned". Yet they participated enthusiastically in the search for crypto-pagans. They probably saw it as an opportunity to discredit their enemies, since many of the "suspects" happened to be prominent Chalcedonians. For example, Gregory, Patriarch of Antioch (term 571–593) was accused of participating in a human sacrifice.

== Sources ==
- Liebeschuetz, John Hugo Wolfgang Gideon (2001). The Decline and Fall of the Roman City. Oxford, United Kingdom: Oxford University Press. ISBN 978-0-19-926109-3.
- Martindale, John Robert; Jones, Arnold Hugh Martin; Morris, J., eds. (1992). The Prosopography of the Later Roman Empire. Vol. III: A.D. 527–641. Cambridge, United Kingdom: Cambridge University Press. ISBN 978-0-521-20160-5.
- Palmer, Andrew; Brock, Sebastian P.; Hoyland, Robert (1993). The Seventh Century in the West-Syrian Chronicles. Liverpool, United Kingdom: Liverpool University Press. ISBN 978-0-85323-238-4.
