= 593 =

Calendar year

593 in various calendars
- Gregorian calendar: 593; DXCIII
- Ab urbe condita: 1346
- Armenian calendar: 42; ԹՎ ԽԲ
- Assyrian calendar: 5343
- Balinese saka calendar: 514–515
- Bengali calendar: −1 – 0
- Berber calendar: 1543
- Buddhist calendar: 1137
- Burmese calendar: −45
- Byzantine calendar: 6101–6102
- Chinese calendar: 壬子年 (Water Rat); 3290 or 3083 — to — 癸丑年 (Water Ox); 3291 or 3084
- Coptic calendar: 309–310
- Discordian calendar: 1759
- Ethiopian calendar: 585–586
- Hebrew calendar: 4353–4354
- Hindu calendars
- Vikram Samvat: 649–650
- Shaka Samvat: 514–515
- Kali Yuga: 3693–3694
- Holocene calendar: 10593
- Iranian calendar: 29 BP – 28 BP
- Islamic calendar: 30 BH – 29 BH
- Javanese calendar: 482–483
- Julian calendar: 593; DXCIII
- Korean calendar: 2926
- Minguo calendar: 1319 before ROC 民前1319年
- Nanakshahi calendar: −875
- Seleucid era: 904/905 AG
- Thai solar calendar: 1135–1136
- Tibetan calendar: ཆུ་ཕོ་བྱི་བ་ལོ་ (male Water-Rat); 719 or 338 or −434 — to — ཆུ་མོ་གླང་ལོ་ (female Water-Ox); 720 or 339 or −433

The Northern Balkans in the 6th century

Year 593 (DXCIII) was a common year starting on Thursday of the Julian calendar. The denomination 593 for this year has been used since the early medieval period, when the Anno Domini calendar era became the prevalent method in Europe for naming years.

== Events ==
=== By place ===
==== Byzantine Empire ====
- Spring – Priscus, commander-in-chief in Thrace, defeats the Slavic tribes and Gepids on Byzantine territory south of the Danube. He crosses the river to fight in the uncharted swamps and forests of modern-day Wallachia.
- Autumn – Emperor Maurice orders Priscus to spend the winter with his troops on the northern Danube bank, but he disobeys the emperor's order and retreats to the port city of Odessus (Varna) on the Black Sea Coast.

==== Britain ====
- Æthelfrith of Northumbria succeeds Hussa as king of Bernicia (Scotland). His accession possibly involves dynastic rivalry and the exile of Hussa's relatives.
- Pybba succeeds his father Creoda as king of Mercia (approximate date).

==== Persia ====
- The Persian usurper Hormizd V (who rises temporarily to power) is defeated by King Khosrau II.

==== Asia ====
- Empress Suiko begins a long reign during a pivotal period, in which Buddhism influences the development and culture of Japan. She is the first female ruler and the first to receive official recognition from China.
- Suiko appoints her 21-year-old nephew Shōtoku as regent, with strongman Umako Soga. He holds shared power for nearly 30 years, creating the nation's first constitution (Seventeen-article constitution).

=== By topic ===
==== Art ====
- The Altar to Amitābha Buddha is made during the Sui dynasty. It is now kept at the Museum of Fine Arts, Boston.

==== Religion ====
- Anastasius I is restored as patriarch of Antioch, after Gregory dies.
- The Shitennō-ji monastery is founded at Osaka (Japan) by Shōtoku.

== Births ==
- Jomei, emperor of Japan (d. 641)
- Zaynab bint Jahsh, wife of Muhammad (d. 641)

== Deaths ==
- Ceawlin, king of Wessex (approximate date)
- Creoda, king of Mercia (approximate date)
- Eberigisil, bishop of Cologne (approximate date)
- Gregory, patriarch of Antioch (approximate date)
- Hussa, king of Bernicia (approximate date)
- Ino Anastasia, Byzantine empress consort
- Paul, father of Maurice (approximate date)
