= Anastasius I =

Anastasius I or Anastasios I may refer to:

- Anastasius I Dicorus (c. 431–518), Roman emperor
- Anastasius I of Antioch (died 599), Patriarch of Antioch
- Pope Anastasius I (died 401), pope
