= Hammad al-Harrani =

Islamic scholar

- حماد الحراني
- Born: Abu al-Thana' Hammad ibn Hibat Allah ibn Hammad ibn al-Fudayl al-Harrani al-Hanbali; 12th century Harran
- Died: 1202; Harran
- Occupations: Scholar, Poet, Merchant, Traveler
- Era: Islamic Golden Age
- Known for: History of Harran, Poetry
- Notable work: Lost history of Harran, Compiled poems

Hammad al-Harrani (Arabic: حماد الحراني) or Abu al-Thana' Hammad ibn Hibat Allah ibn Hammad ibn al-Fudayl al-Harrani al-Hanbali was a Muslim scholar, poet, merchant and traveler who left his home town Harran to live in Alexandria under the reign of Salah al-Din al-Ayyubi. Both towns were dominated by Hanbali school. However, he came back to Harran and died there in 598 AH/1202 AD. He is the author of a lost history of Harran and compiled poems.

There were many scholars who listened and reported hadiths from Hammad al-Harrani during his stay in Alexandria and after he returned to Harran; among them were Ibn al-Hajib (570-646 AH) and Ahmad al-Harrani.

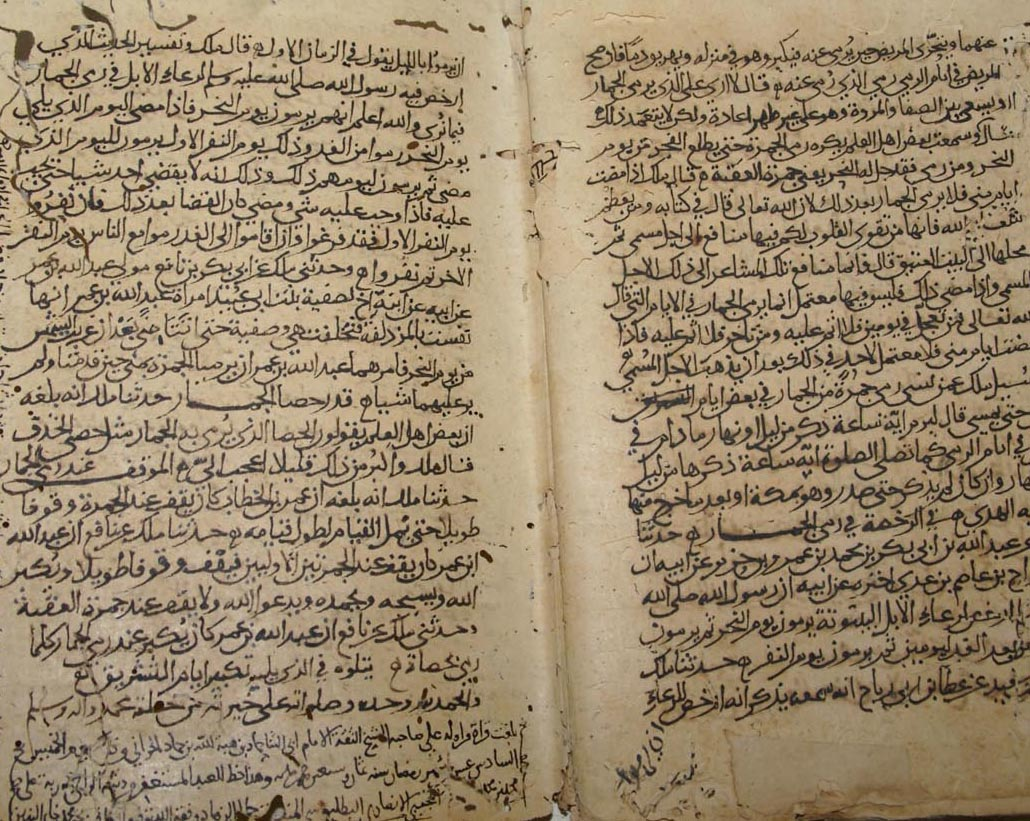
Hammad al-Harrani's autograph, dated 1179 A.D., Adilnor Collection.

== See also ==
- Hanbali
