= Crypto-paganism =

Secret adherence to Paganism

Crypto-paganism is the secret adherence to paganism while publicly professing to be of another faith. In historical context, a crypto-pagan (from the Greek kryptos – κρυπτός, "hidden") was most likely to maintain the pretense of believing in an Abrahamic religion, while continuing to observe their own religious practices in private. Hiding one's true religious faith may be in response to a perceived danger of rejection by society, or else to formalized persecution by an established government or religious organization.

== In antiquity and the early Byzantine Empire ==
Anthemius, one of the last Roman emperors of the West who ruled from 467 to 472, surrounded himself with prominent pagans such as Messius Phoebus Severus and was believed to hold pagan views. According to Damascius, Severus and Anthemius had a secret plan to restore the Pagan cults. The murder of Anthemius (by Ricimer) destroyed the hopes of those pagans who believed that the traditional rites would be restored.

Anatolius (Osroene) (died c. 579/580) was a Byzantine official, active in the reign of Tiberius II Constantine (r. 574–582). He was accused of being a crypto-pagan and consequently executed. Acindynus, a Byzantine governor of Carrhae (Harran), was accused by his scribe/secretary Iyarios (elsewhere called Honorius) of secretly practicing paganism. Stephen, Bishop of Harran, had Acindynus executed in 602, either by impalement or crucifixion. The deceased governor was succeeded by Iyarios.

Tuomo Lankila of the University of Jyväskylä argues that the Corpus Areopagiticum, an ostensibly Christian text attributed to Pseudo-Dionysius the Areopagite, was in fact written by Damascius, the last head of the pagan Neoplatonist school of Athens. Lankila claims the work was written "in order to resurrect more easily the polytheistic religion in better times".

== In the Middle Ages ==
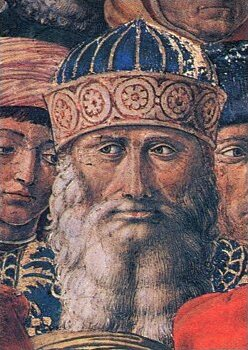
Portrait of Gemistus Pletho, detail of a fresco by acquaintance Benozzo Gozzoli, Palazzo Medici Riccardi, Florence, Italy

The Christianization of Europe typically involved Christian missionaries managing to convert a king or other ruler who then proclaimed his kingdom to be Christian. It took several generations for Christianity to become truly established in the whole society, with many people – especially in rural and outlying areas – clinging to their ancestral religion, deemed "Pagan" from the Christian point of view. With the Church establishing its hierarchy and a network of parish priests, such practices were increasingly driven underground. Alternately, the Church in some cases gave some widespread practices a Christian guise, for example attributing annual processions or rites, dedicated to a local deity, to a Christian saint instead.

The Byzantine philosopher Gemistus Pletho (c. 1355 – 26 June 1452) secretly advocated polytheism in his book Nomoi, which he only circulated among close friends. After his death it came into the hands of the Ecumenical Patriarch of Constantinople Gennadius II, who eventually burned it, although Gennadius' summary of its content survives in a letter.

== In the modern world ==
In Wicca, as presented by neo-pagan theorist Gerald Gardner, traditional laws instruct practitioners to conceal their practices and religious paraphernalia by using innocuous substitutes which could easily be explained away in case of discovery:

"To void discovery, let the working tools be as ordinary things that any may have in their houses. Let the Pentacles be of wax, so they may be broken at once. Have no sword unless your rank allows you one. Have no names or signs on anything. Write the names and signs on them in ink before consecrating them and wash it off immediately after. Do not Bigrave [engrave] them, lest they cause discovery. Let the colour of the hilts tell which is which. Ever remember, ye are the Hidden Children of the Gods."

Among modern guides, City Magick, an urban pagan's manual published in 2001, gives examples of how to hide a pagan altar at home or at work, using items such as letter openers, paper weights, and coffee cups and relaxation candles in the place of the traditional sword, stone, goblet and candle.

== See also ==
- Backsliding
- Chinese Rites controversy
- Crypto-Christianity
- Crypto-Hinduism
- Crypto-Islam
- Crypto-Judaism
- Forced conversion
