= Harran Castle =

Medieval castle in Turkey

Coordinates: 36°51′34.6″N 39°02′07.0″E

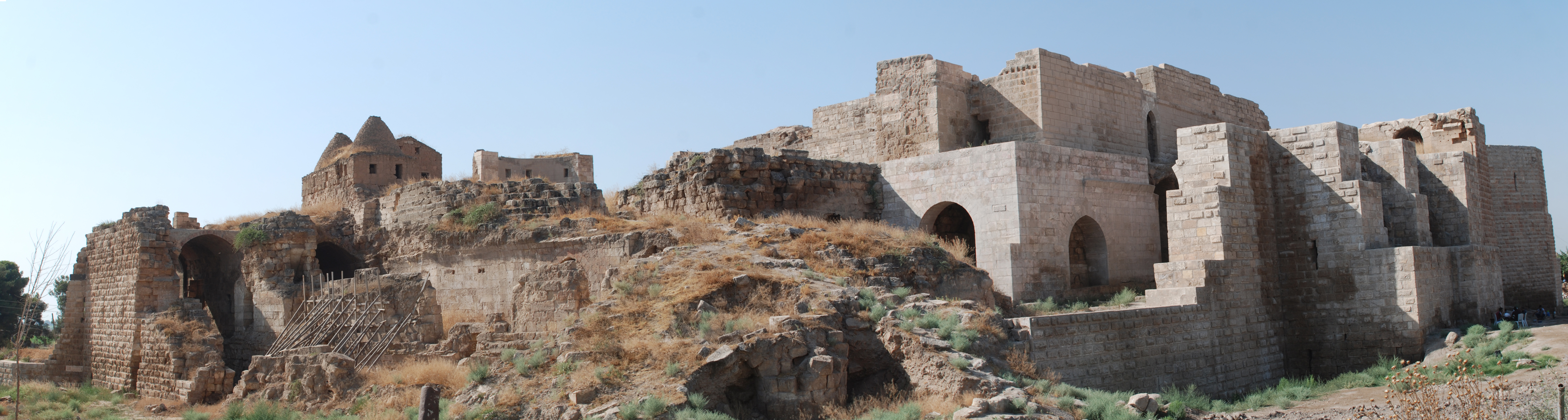
Ruins of the Harran Castle

The Harran Castle (Turkish: Harran Kalesi) or Harran Citadel is a castle ruin in Harran, Turkey. Most of the present structure dates to the Ayyubid Sultanate c. 1200 but the castle is substantially older. Its exact founding date is unknown but it appears to have been built at some point during the time Harran was under Byzantine rule (4th–7th centuries) and was originally a palace.

Despite being rectangular in shape, the castle was in the Middle Ages nicknamed (qadīman) al-Mudawwar ("the round one"); this name appears to derive from the castle having been built on top of the ruins of an earlier round building. One text also refers to the castle as al-Mudarraq ("the shielded one") though this is perhaps a scribal error.

== History ==
The Harran Castle is located in the southeast part of Harran and is connected to the city's ancient walls. In the Middle Ages, the castle was surrounded by a wide open space and a moat. The date of the castle's construction is unknown; the earliest known reference to it in literary sources dates to 958, when it was mentioned writings of the Arab geographer Al-Maqdisi. Al-Maqdisi praised the castle for its masonry, which he thought "resembled that of Jerusalem in beauty"; high praise since he came from a family of architects and was very proud of the architecture in Jerusalem, where he had been born.

Although there are no visible traces of pre-Islamic architecture in the castle, Ancient Greek inscriptions found at one of the castle gates suggest that the original structure was built at some point during the time Harran was under Byzantine rule (4th–7th centuries). It was then enlarged and expanded under Islamic rule in the 9th century. Some scholars believe the castle was founded on top of the ruins of the Eḫulḫul, the ancient pagan moon temple of Harran. Both the castle and the Harran Grand Mosque are described in literary sources as having been built on the temple; the castle is further supported on account of its higher elevation but the mosque is generally favored due to having been a place of worship and by evidence such as Babylonian inscriptions and four stelae of the Babylonian king Nabonidus (who restored the Eḫulḫul) having been found among its ruins.

The castle was originally a palace and was only converted into a more militaristic fortress during politically uncertain periods in the 11th to 13th centuries. It was a three-story structure with 150 rooms and mainly constructed out of cut basalt and limestone blocks of various sizes. Several of the rulers of Harran through the centuries oversaw restoration and repair work on the castle. Significant restorations were done under the Fatimid Caliphate in 1032 and 1059 and the Ayyubid Sultanate in 1196. A large earthquake in 1114 or 1115 caused the collapse of half of the castle, though it was subsequently restored. Most of the present structure of the castle dates to the time of the Ayyubids c. 1200, following renovation work made conducted by Sultan Al-Adil I (r. 1200–1218). The city of Harran and the castle itself had separately appointed governors; there are several times when Harran was captured by conquerors that the castle continued to resist for some time.

At the time Harran was abandoned and left desolate by the Mongol Empire in 1271, the castle had been heavily damaged. Harran was captured by the Mamluk Sultanate later in the 1270s but there was little interest in reviving the city. The Mamluks restored the castle itself, probably in the 1330s or 1340s, and made it the seat of a local military governor. The castle remained in sporadic usage for some time into the Ottoman period in the 16th century. It appears to still have been relatively intact in the 17th century, since it is described in the writings of the 17th-century explorer Evliya Çelebi to still appear "as if it had just been made". The castle has deteriorated over the centuries due to both natural causes and the use of material from the ruin as building materials by locals,

The earliest archaeological work on the castle was a short study of its ruins published by Conrad Preusser in 1911. As part of recent excavation and conservation efforts supported by the Turkish Ministry of Culture and Tourism, the castle was in 2012–2014 partially reconstructed using stonework similar to what would have been used in the historical building. The portions of the castle where active excavation and repairs have been completed are accessible to tourists. Harran Castle is considered one of the most important historical monuments in the Şanlıurfa Province.

== Layout ==
The castle has an irregular rectangular shape and has dodecagon-shaped towers at each of its four corners. The castle has the dimensions of 90×130 metres (295×425 feet). When all three floors were intact, it would have possessed a total internal area of around 30,000 square metres (320,000 square feet). The southwest and northeast towers are still partially standing, the inner part of the southeast tower is still standing, and the northwest tower is completely demolished.
