= Madrasa of Harran =

Medieval university

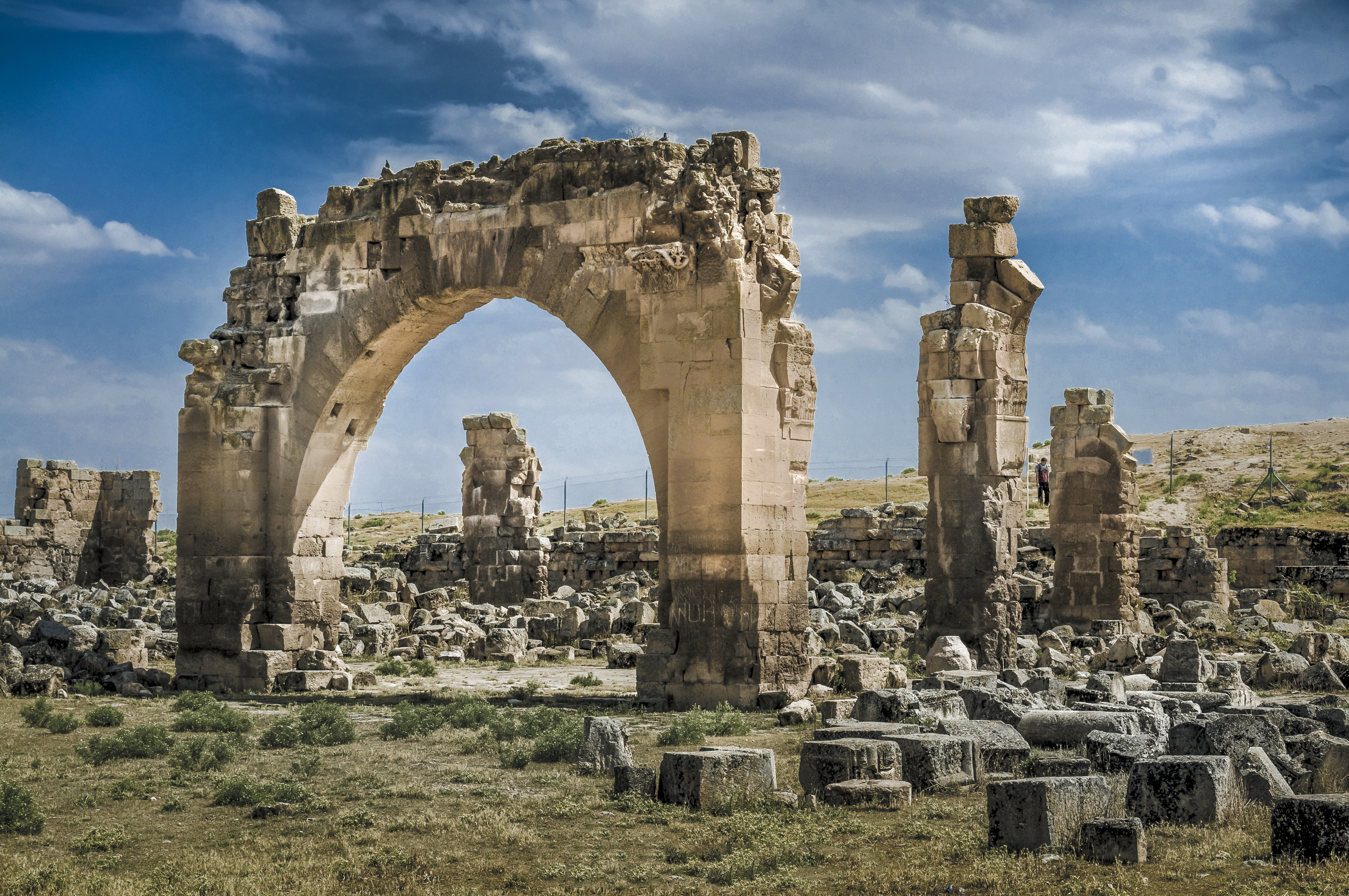
Ruins of the institution

The Madrasa of Harran, was a medieval Islamic institution of higher learning in Harran (in modern-day southeastern Turkey), active from the 8th to at least the 12th century and later briefly again in the 16th century. The school was the first Islamic institution of its kind, had a liberal intellectual environment and made Harran renowned as a center of science and learning. Translation activity at the school, particularly the translations of documents from Syriac and Greek into Arabic, was historically important in regard to the transmission and preservation of classical Greek and Syriac learning.

== History ==
The Madrasa of Harran was founded by the Umayyad caliph Umar II in 717, who brought many scholars from other cities throughout the lands under his control and installed them in Harran. The school was the first Islamic institution of its kind The school had a liberal intellectual environment and studies were made of religious and intellectual traditions that would have been rejected as heretical in many other places in the world. As a result of the school, Harran reached international renown and flourished as a center of science and learning.

The madrasa enjoyed its golden age in the late 8th century and 9th centuries,particularly under the Abbasid caliph Harun al-Rashid (r. 786–809). At its height, more than 8,000 students gathered at the madrasa, educated in mathematics, philosophy, medicine, astrology, astronomy and natural sciences. Many prominent scholars of their age, including Al-Battani, Jabir ibn Hayyan and Thābit ibn Qurra, studied at the Madrasa of Harran.The s was also an important site for translations of documents from Syriac and Greek into Arabic and thus also an important institution in the history of transmission and preservation of classical Greek and Syriac learning. At some point, Neoplatonism was introduced to the school, though the precise timing is not clear. It might have been brought to Harran by Thābit ibn Qurra in the late 9th century, who could have learnt Neoplatonism in Baghdad. Alternatively, Neoplatonism might have been brought to Harran as early as the 6th century by Neoplatonists such as Simplicius of Cilicia, who fled persecution in the Byzantine Empire.

Though having declined since the 9th century, the madrasa remained active until at least the 12th century, when Harran was under the rule of the Zengid dynasty. It ceased operations at the latest in 1271, when Harran was severely damaged and abandoned. After the Ottoman Empire captured the region containing Harran, Sultan Selim I (r. 1512–1520) repaired the university and made an attempt to revive it, though it declined in importance again after his reign.

== See also ==
- Harran University, a modern university in nearby Urfa
- Islamic Golden Age
- Toledo School of Translators
