= Anastasius II of Antioch =

Patriarch of Antioch from 599 to 609

Saint Anastasius
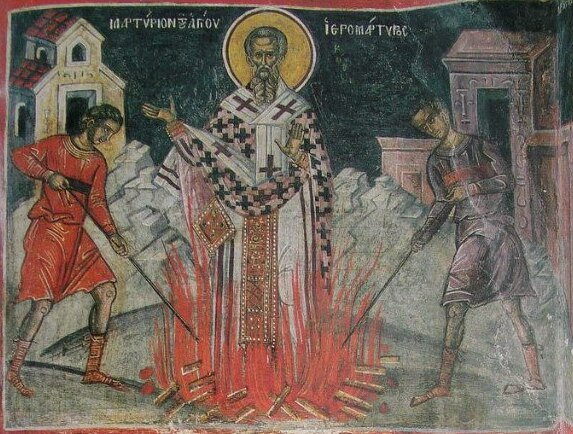

Greek Patriarch of Antioch and Martyr
- Born: 550
- Died: 609; Antioch
- Venerated in: Catholic Church; Eastern Orthodox Church; Apostolic Catholic Church
- Canonized: Pre-Congregation
- Feast: 20 April Eastern Orthodox; 21 December Catholic

Anastasius II of Antioch, also known as Anastasius the Younger, succeeded Anastasius of Antioch as Greek Patriarch of Antioch, in 599.

Anastasius is known for his opposition and suppression of simony in his diocese, with the support of Pope Gregory the Great.

In 609 Anastasius is said to have been burned alive during an uprising of Syrian Jews, who were under threat of forced conversion to Christianity. Local Monophysites were also engaged in a revolt at the time. It is possible that they committed the assassination, rather than the Jews.
