= Harran =

Ancient city in Upper Mesopotamia

- District and municipality
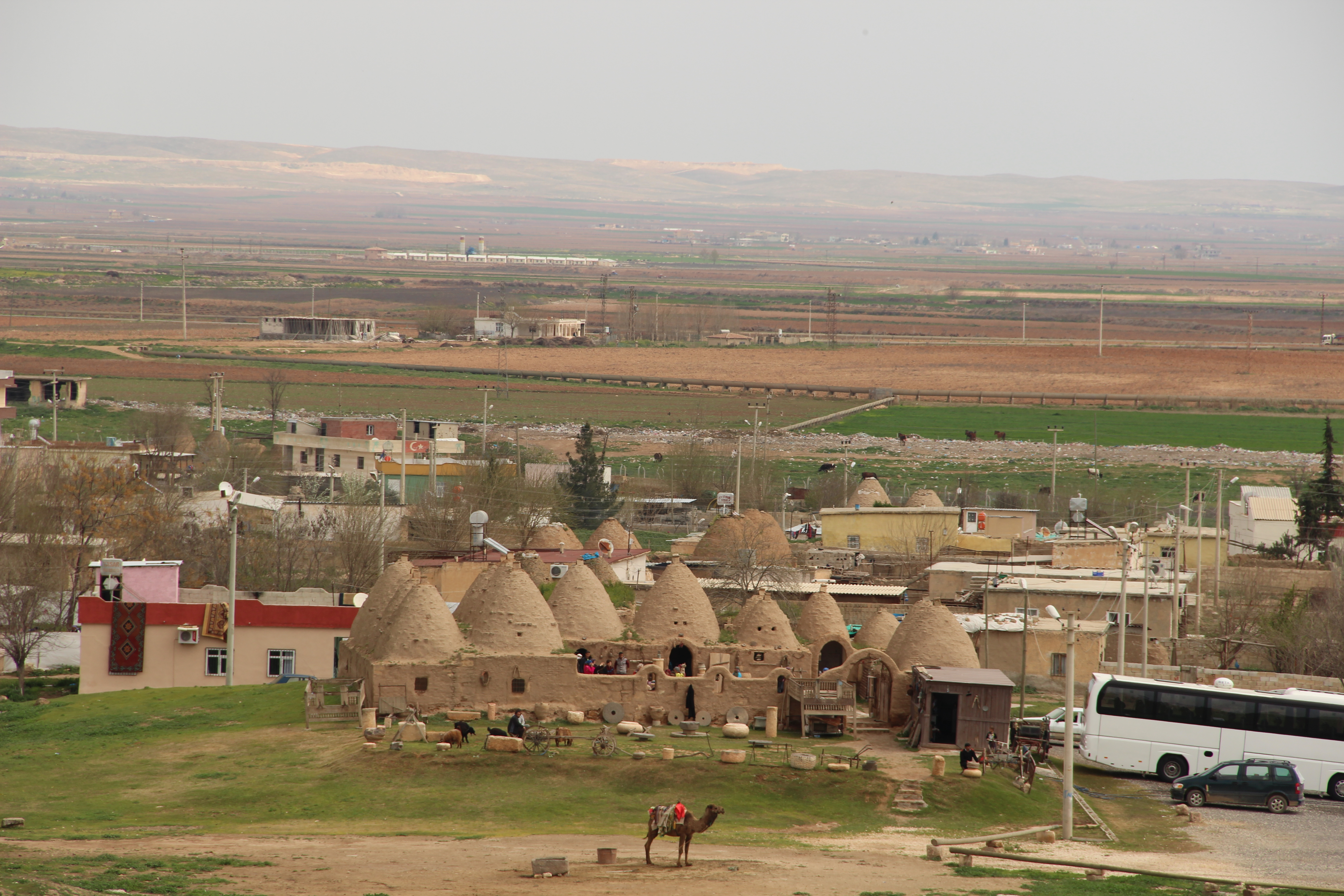
- The Harran plain, 2015

- Logo

- Location within Turkey Location within Şanlıurfa
- Coordinates: 36°52′15″N 39°01′30″E
- Country: Turkey
- Province: Şanlıurfa
- Established: c. 2500–2000 BC

Government
  - Mayor: Mahmut Özyavuz (MHP)
- Area: 904 km^{2} (349 sq mi)
- Elevation: 360 m (1,180 ft)
- Population (2022): 96,072
  - Density: 106/km^{2} (275/sq mi)
- Time zone: UTC+3 (TRT)
- Postal code: 63510
- Area code: 0414
- Website: www.harran.bel.tr

Harran (Note: For other names and renditions in other languages, see the "toponymy" section.) is a municipality and district of Şanlıurfa, Turkey. Its area is 904 km^{2}, and its population is 96,072 (2022). It is approximately 40 kilometres (25 miles) southeast of Urfa and 20 kilometres (12 miles) from the Syrian border crossing at Akçakale.

Harran was founded at some point between the 25th and 20th centuries BC, possibly as a merchant colony by Sumerian traders from Ur. Over the course of its early history, Harran rapidly grew into a major Mesopotamian cultural, commercial and religious center. It was made a religiously and politically influential city through its association with the moon-god Sin; many prominent Mesopotamian rulers consulted with and renovated the moon-temple of Eḫulḫul in Harran. Harran came under Assyrian rule under Adad-nirari I (r. 1305–1274 BC) and became a provincial capital often second in importance only to the Assyrian capital of Assur itself. During the collapse of the Assyrian Empire, Harran briefly served as the final capital of the Neo-Assyrian Empire (612–609 BC).

The city continued to be prominent after the fall of Assyria and experienced varying degrees of foreign cultural influence during its time under the Neo-Babylonian (609–539 BC), Achaemenid (539–330 BC), Macedonian (330–312 BC) and Seleucid (312–132 BC) empires. During classical antiquity Harran was often contested between the Roman and Parthian (later Sasanian) empires. In 53 BC Harran was the site of the Battle of Carrhae, one of the worst military defeats in Roman history. The Harranian moon cult of Sin proved to be enduring and lasted long into the Middle Ages, known to have existed as late as the 11th century AD. The last worshippers of Sin at that time migrated to the regions around Mardin and Mosul. Harran was captured by the Rashidun Caliphate in 640 and remained an important city in the Islamic period. It flourished as a center of science and learning and was the site of both the first Islamic university (the Harran University) (Note: Not to be confused with the modern Harran University, established in Urfa in 1992.) and the oldest mosque in Turkey (Note: Harran is located in Turkey's Southeastern Anatolia Region. Depending on how Anatolia's borders are defined, Harran may or may not be seen as part of Anatolia but remains a part of the Republic of Turkiye.) (the Harran Grand Mosque). Harran twice served as a capital city in the Middle Ages, first briefly under the Umayyad Caliphate (744–750) and later under the Numayrid Emirate (990–1081).

The city was conquered by the Mongol Empire in 1260 but was largely destroyed and left abandoned in 1271. Although Harran was kept as a military outpost under some later regimes, it has over the last five centuries mainly been used as a temporary settlement by local nomadic societies. Harran transitioned back into a semi-permanent village settlement in the 1840s, but has only recently grown into a permanent town through advancements in local irrigation and agriculture. Harran was a Turkish district until 1946, after when it was downgraded to a sub-district of the Akçakale district. It regained its status as a district in 1987. Today, it is a major local tourist spot. The town is particularly famous for its unique beehive houses, which are reminiscent of buildings that were already present at Harran in ancient Mesopotamian times.

== Toponymy ==
The name Harran is recorded for the city from the earliest documents mentioning it and has remained in continuous use and largely unchanged since ancient times. Harran is mentioned in early cuneiform records of the Sumerians and Hittites as 𒌷𒊮𒆜 (URU.ŠÀ.KASKAL), sometimes shortened to 𒆜 (KASKAL), transliterated as Ḫarrānu(m). Ḫarrānu literally means "journey", "caravan" or "crossroad". It is often interpreted as "caravan path" or "intersection of routes and travel". Harran is rendered as חָרָן (Ḥaran) in Hebrew and Aramaic, حَرَّان (Ḥarrân) in Arabic, حران (Harrān) in Ottoman Turkish, and Harran in modern Turkish.

The ancient Assyrians called the city Huzirina. Ḫarrānu was Hellenised to Kárrhai (Κάῤῥαι) in the Hellenistic period. The Romans later Latinised the Greek name into Carrhae. Due to the prominence of both Harran and Carrhae in historical literary sources, some scholars use the compound name "Carrhae-Harran" for the ancient city. Under the Byzantine Empire, the city continued to be called Carrhae (Kάρραι) but was also sometimes referred to as Hellenopolis (Ἑλληνόπολις), "city of the pagan Greeks", in reference to the strong pagan traditions there.

== History ==
Historical affiliations

List
- Uncertain; independent? c. 2500/2000–1800 BC
- Shamsi-Adad's kingdom c. 1800–1775 BC
- Independent c. 1775–1550? BC
- Kingdom of Mitanni c. 1550–1300 BC
- Assyrian Empire c. 1300–610 BC
- Babylonian Empire 610–539 BC
- Achaemenid Empire 539–330 BC
- Macedonian Empire 330–312 BC
- Seleucid Empire 312–132 BC
- Kingdom of Osroene (Parthian vassal) 132 BC–AD 165
- Roman Empire (1st time) 165–240
- Sasanian Empire (1st time) 240–242
- Roman Empire (2nd time) 242–549
- Sasanian Empire (2nd time) 549–562?
- Roman/Byzantine Empire (3rd time) 562?–640
- Rashidun Caliphate 640–661
- Umayyad Caliphate 661–750
- Abbasid Caliphate 750–890
- Hamdanid Emirate 890–990
- Numayrid Emirate 990–1081
- Uqaylid Emirate 1081–1102
- Seljuk Empire (Jikirmish) 1102–1106
- Artuqid State 1106–1127
- Zengid Emirate 1127–1182
- Ayyubid Sultanate (1st time) 1182–1237
- Khwarazmians 1237–1240
- Ayyubid Sultanate (2nd time) 1237–1240
- Mongol Empire 1260–1271
- Mamluk Sultanate 1270s–1517
- Ottoman Empire 1517–1922
- Republic of Turkey 1922–present

=== Early history ===
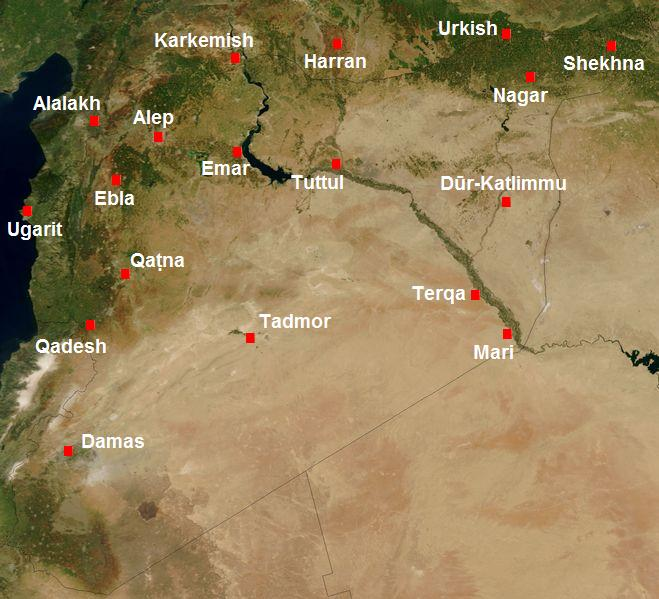
Harran and other major cities of ancient Syria

Harran is situated at an important geographical crossroad, both between the Euphrates and Tigris rivers and at the border between the ancient Mesopotamian and Anatolian cultures. The earliest known settlements in the region surrounding Harran date to 10000–8000 BC and settlements in its close vicinity are known to have existed by 6000 BC. The region was linked to the Sumerians, and was occupied by ancient Semitic-speaking people around 2750 BCE. The earliest written records concerning Harran suggest that the city itself was founded c. 2500–2000 BCE as a merchant outpost by traders from the Sumerian city of Ur.

The first clear evidence about Harran comes from the inscribed clay tablets found at Ebla, dating to the 24th century BCE. These tablets provide good information about the social and administrative life of Harran during the Early Bronze Age. Harran is mentioned in the Ebla tablets alongside the cities of Urshun and Irrite; at that time, the ruler of Harran was a queen named Zugalum.

Harran was from early on associated with the Mesopotamian moon-god Nanna (later named Sin) and soon became regarded as a sacred city of the moon. Harran's great moon temple, the Eḫulḫul ("Temple of Rejoicing"), was already present in the city by c. 2000 BCE. Sin was also a major deity in Ur, which also housed his main temple, but Harran's affinity for the moon can perhaps also be explained by its geography and climate: According to Donald Frew, in the hot and desolate landscape surrounding Harran the sun was a natural enemy, whereas the night (and thus the moon) were more comforting. The sun-god Shamash is however also thought to have had a temple in Harran. Another prominent deity in the city was Sin's son Nusku, the god of light.

Although next to nothing is known of the architecture and layout of Harran prior to the Middle Ages, the city is believed to have been designed according to some vaguely moon-shaped plan. Medieval sources allude to its shape, but what kind of ‘moon shape’ those sources meant is unclear.

The religious authorities of Harran, speaking on behalf of Sin, were considered suitable guarantors and signatories in political treaties. Already c. 2000 BCE, a peace treaty was sealed in the Eḫulḫul between Mari and an Amorite tribe called the Yaminites. Further treaties signed that invoke Sin of Harran include a 14th century BCE treaty between Šuppiluliuma I of the Hittites and Shattiwaza of Mitanni, and an 8th century BCE treaty between the Assyrian king Ashur-nirari V and Mati'ilu of Arpad.

=== Middle Bronze Age ===
Over time, Harran grew into a major Mesopotamian cultural, commercial and religious center. In addition to its religious importance, Harran was also important due to its strategic placement on an intersection of trade routes. Because Harran had an abundance of goods that passed through its region, it often became a target for raids. In the 19th century BC, the lands surrounding Harran were occupied by confederations of semi-nomadic tribes.

In the following century the Amorite king Shamshi-Adad I (r. 1808–1776 BC) is recorded to have launched an expedition to conquer the region around Harran and secure the trade routes there from hostile forces. After the fall of Shamshi-Adad I's kingdom in the early 18th century BC, Harran was an independent city-state for a time; archives from Mari from the time of Zimri-Lim (r. 1775–1761) record that Harran in his time was ruled by a king named Asdi-Takim.

=== Late Bronze Age ===
Harran was incorporated into the Mitanni kingdom in the 16th century BC and later conquered from Mitanni by the Assyrian king Adad-nirari I (r. 1305–1274 BC).

=== Iron Age ===
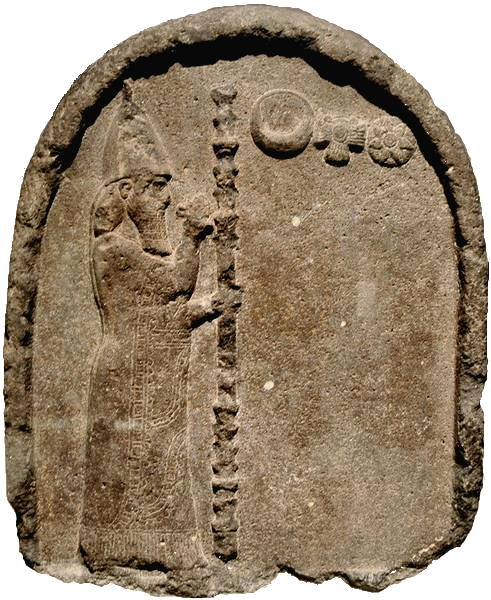
The Harran Stela, discovered at Harran in 1956, depicting the Neo-Babylonian king Nabonidus (r. 556–539 BC)

The city would not be firmly incorporated into Middle Assyrian Empire until the 1100s BC, before which it was often occupied by Arameans. Under Assyria, Harran grew into a fortified provincial capital second in importance only to the capital of Assur itself. In the 10th century, Harran was one of the few cities, along with Assur, to be exempt from needing to pay tribute to the Assyrian king and in the 9th and 8th centuries BC, Harran was made the seat of the turtanu, the Assyrian commander-in-chief.

Since Harran was the sacred city of the moon-god, many Mesopotamian kings travelled there to receive the blessing and confirmation of their rule from the city's religious officials and in turn renovated and expanded Harran and its temples. The Eḫulḫul was renovated twice in the Neo-Assyrian period by the kings Shalmaneser III (r. 859–824 BC) and Ashurbanipal (r. 669–631 BC). Prophecies made by prophets and oracles of the moon cult of Harran were held in high regard; in the 670s BC the Harranians correctly prophesied that Esarhaddon (r. 681–669 BC) would conquer Egypt and Sasi, a usurper proclaimed king by the Oracle of Nusku from Harran, managed to rally widespread support in the empire before he was defeated. The reign of Esarhaddon in particular marked the rise of the Eḫulḫul into one of the most prominent religious sanctuaries in the ancient Near East, a position it would retain for centuries.

The Neo-Assyrian Empire was defeated in the late seventh century BC by the newly established Neo-Babylonian Empire and the Medes. The Assyrian capital of Nineveh fell in 612 BC but the remnants of the Assyrian army, led by Crown Prince Aššur-uballiṭ II, rallied at Harran. Harran is therefore typically regarded as the short-lived final capital of ancient Assyria. Aššur-uballiṭ II underwent a coronation ceremony at Harran, being invested with rulership by Sin. After a long siege lasting from the winter of 610 BC to early 609 BC, Harran was captured by the Babylonians and Medes, ending the Neo-Assyrian Empire. The Eḫulḫul was destroyed by the Medes at this time and was neglected for many years but was eventually restored by the Neo-Babylonian king Nabonidus (r. 556–539 BC), who was from Harran. The city itself was also significantly revitalised in Nabonidus's reign.

=== Antiquity (539 BC–640) ===
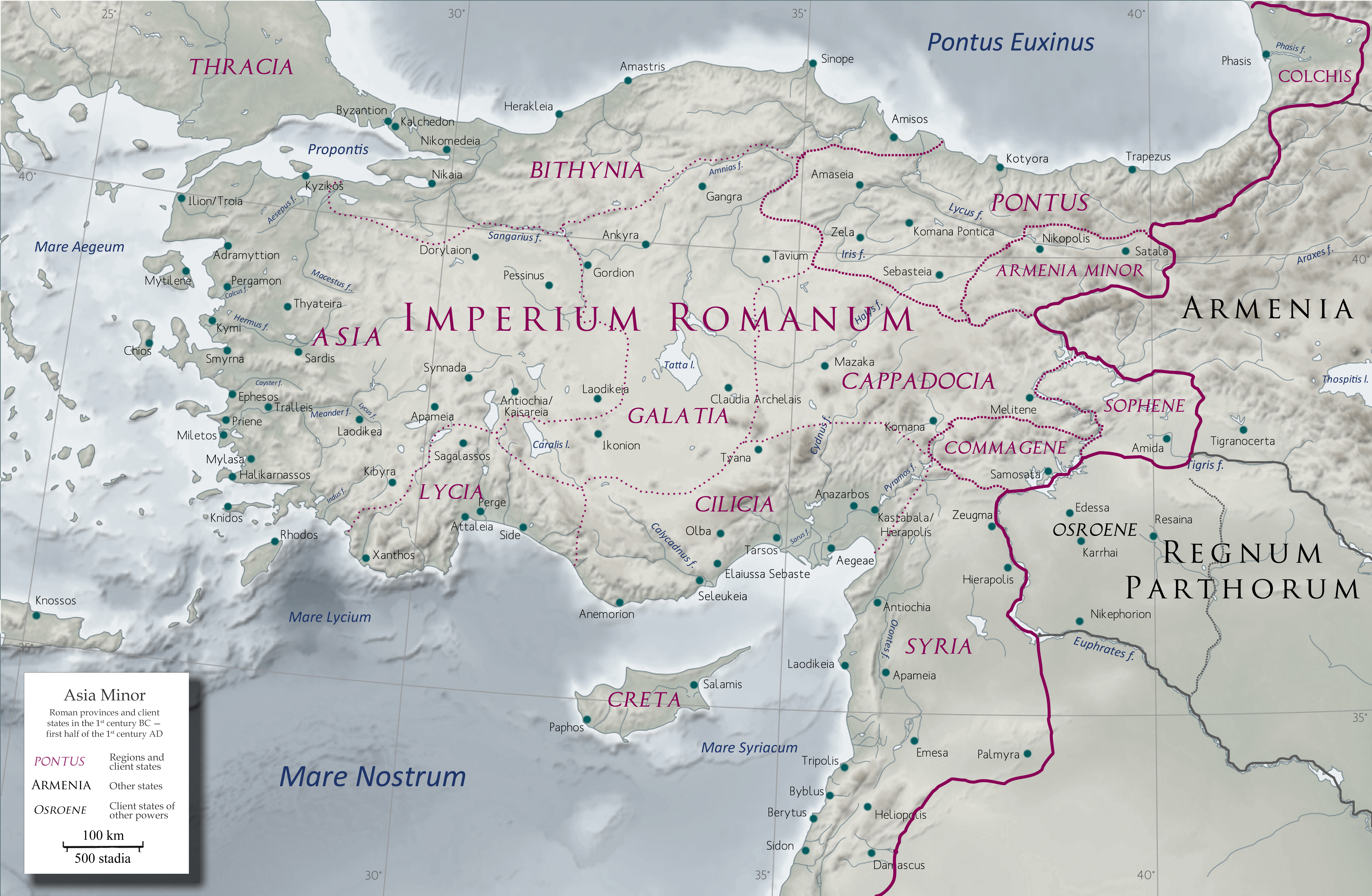
Anatolia in the 1st century AD, including Osroene and Harran ("Karrhai")

After the fall of the Neo-Babylonian Empire in 539 BC, Harran was successively under the control of the Achaemenid (539–330 BC), Macedonian (330–312 BC) and Seleucid (312–132 BC) empires. Under the Seleucids, Harran largely functioned as a military colony and from the time of the Macedonian conquest onwards, many Greeks settled in Harran. Under the centuries of Hellenic control, Harran gradually underwent some Hellenization of its culture. (Note: The deities worshipped at Harran for instance began to at times be referred to by the names of corresponding ancient Greek deities but their ancient Mesopotamian names also continued being used.) After the collapse of the Seleucid Empire, Harran became part of the Kingdom of Osroene in 132 BC, ruled by the Nabatean Arab Abgarid dynasty and most frequently a vassal state of the Parthian Empire. Abgarid rule may have encouraged the local moon cult; the moon was important in both the ancient Bedouin and Nabatean Arab religions.

From the first century BC until the end of antiquity, Harran was typically located near or on the border of the Roman (later Byzantine) and Parthian (later Sasanian) empires. Harran frequently changed hands between the two empires but was in practice often more or less independent. In 53 BC, the city was the site of the Battle of Carrhae between the Romans and Parthians, in which the Parthian general Surena defeated and killed the Roman triumvir Marcus Licinius Crassus, one of the worst military defeats in Roman history. Osroene (and thus also Harran) first came under Roman control as a result of the wars of Lucius Verus and Avidius Cassius in 162–166 AD. Harran gained colonial status under Emperor Septimius Severus in 195. Sources from Roman times describe Harran as a fortified garrison town. In 217, the Roman emperor Caracalla was murdered in Harran while visiting the temple of Sin. Harran, along with the nearby cities of Nisibis and Hatra, were captured by the Sasanian king Ardashir I in 238–240 but was swiftly retaken by Emperor Gordian III. Later in 296, Harran was also the site of a battle where the future emperor Galerius suffered a crushing defeat against the Sasanian king Narseh. In the writings of Ammianus Marcellinus (359), it is noted that the walls of Harran were in poor condition. This issue was not rectified until repairs conducted in the reign of Justinian I (r. 527–565).

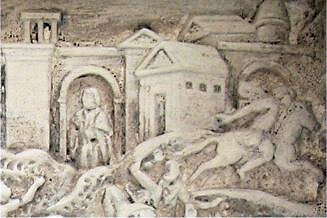
Harran depicted on the Arch of Septimius Severus in Rome

From the time of the Christianization of Mesopotamia and Syria until long into the Middle Ages, Harran developed a rivalry with the nearby city of Edessa due to the cities having polarised attitudes concerning Christianity. Whereas Edessa adopted the new religion very early, Harran remained a pagan stronghold for centuries and became the largest center of pagan cults in eastern Syria. Harran was still overwhelmingly pagan in the 4th century, to the degree that the bishop appointed to Harran in 361 refused to reside in the city and instead lived in Edessa. Despite its paganism, Harran was a site of interest to Christians since the city is mentioned in the Book of Genesis as the town where Abraham and his family stopped on their way from Ur of the Chaldees to Canaan.

The last pagan Roman emperor, Julian (r. 361–363) intentionally avoided the Christian Edessa and instead stopped at Harran in 363 to consult the oracles of the moon temple on his upcoming Persian campaign. Although it is known that Sin was still worshipped at Harran in this time Julian is curiously stated to have consulted the female moon deity Luna. The oracles warned the emperor of impending disaster but Julian proceeded anyway and was killed in the war. Harran was the only city in the Roman Empire to declare citywide mourning after Julian's death. Later sources indicate that the deities worshipped by the pagans of Harran in late antiquity included Sin, Bat-Nikkal (consort of Sin; a different name from his ancient consort Ningal), the "lord with his dogs" (identified as a localised version of the god Nergal), Tar'atha (identified with the Syrian goddess Atargatis), Gadlat (an Arabian goddess), and perhaps Shamash. Though Sin had in the past been the only major deity in Harran, he was by this point only the most important of several different ancient gods.

The pagans of Harran became an issue in the increasingly Christianised late Roman Empire. As late as the early 5th century, the theologian Theodoret wrote that Harran was "a barbarous place, full of the thorns of paganism". At the Second Council of Ephesus (449), the Bishop of Harran, Stephen, was accused of accepting bribes from pagans to let them practice their rituals in peace. Harran was briefly captured by the Sasanian king Khosrow I in 549, who exempted the city from paying the tribute he demanded from Edessa on account of Harran not being Christian like his enemies but rather a stronghold of the "old religion". The endurance of paganism at Harran in the Christian late Roman Empire is likely only explainable through the pagans there offering regular bribes to church officials and civil administrators in the region. In 590, Emperor Maurice (r. 582–602) ordered the Bishop of Harran, Stephen, to persecute the pagans of Harran. Many who refused to convert to Christianity, including the governor Acindynus, were executed. By this time, the Christians and pagans of Harran lived in separate quarters of the city.

=== Middle Ages (640–1271) ===
==== Harran under the caliphates ====
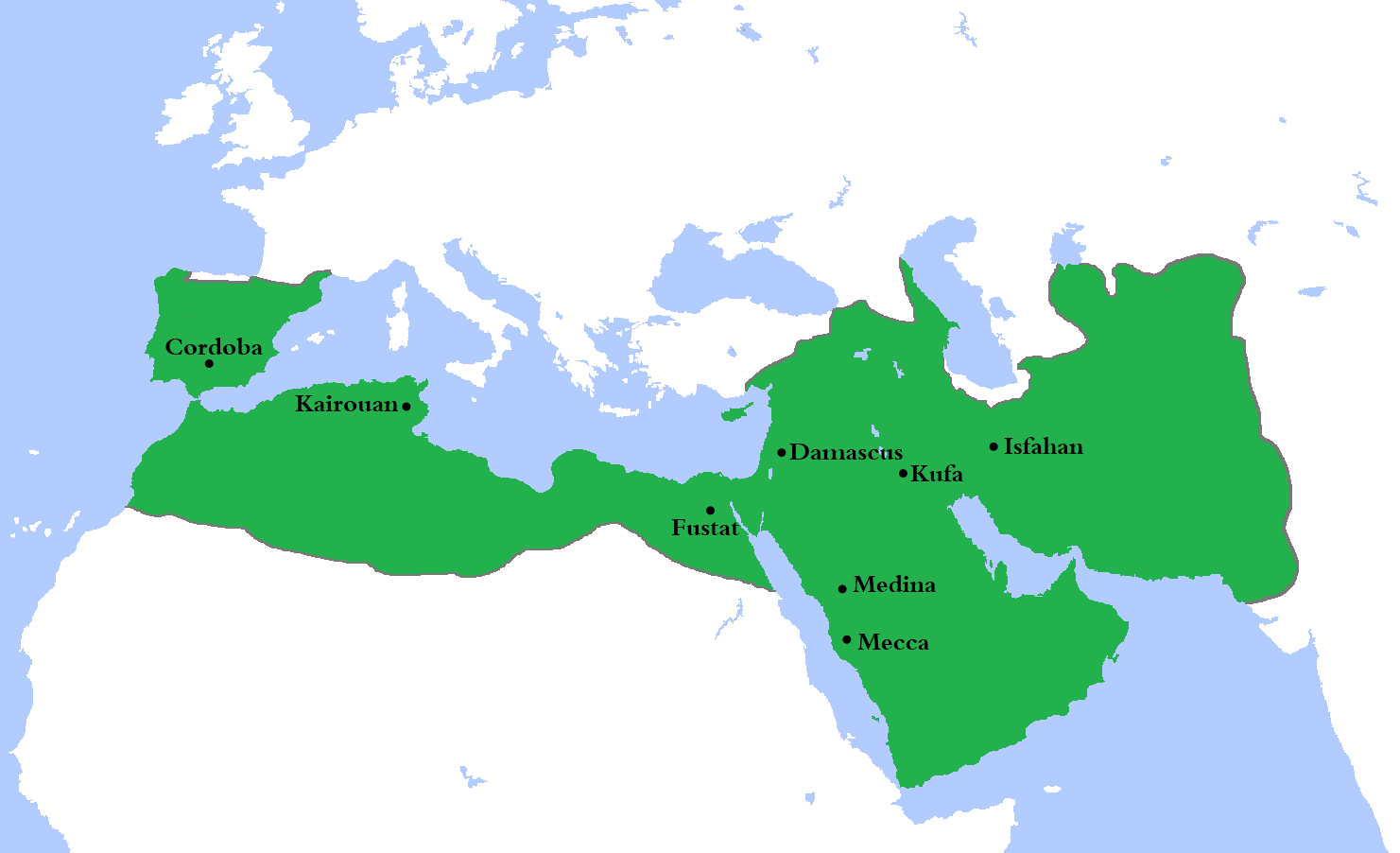
Harran was briefly the capital of the Umayyad Caliphate 744–750

Maurice's persecution of the pagans of Harran had little effect on the strength of the pagan community and Harran remained a largely pagan city. When the armies of the Rashidun Caliphate, led by the general Iyad ibn Ghanm, besieged Harran in the winter of 639–640 it was the pagans of the city who negotiated its peaceful surrender. Ibn Ghanm is recorded to have given the pagans of Harran a new moon temple after the capture of the city. Harran under Islamic rule became one of the most important settlements in the Diyar Mudar district. In 657, Caliph Ali asked the Harranians to aid him against Mu'awiya I, the first Umayyad caliph, but the Harranians instead sided with Mu'awiya at the Battle of Siffin in the same year. In response, it is claimed that Ali enacted a brutal massacre in Harran, exterminating most of the inhabitants. However, there is no evidence that Ali captured or even entered the vicinity of Harran, as the Battle of Siffin had ended in a stalemate for both sides.

Under the Umayyad Caliphate (661–750), Harran was renovated and prospered once more. In 717, Caliph Umar II founded the first Muslim university at Harran, bringing many scholars from other cities in the caliphate (including Alexandria) and installing them in Harran. Harran was made the capital of the Umayyad Caliphate under its last caliph, Marwan II, from 744 to 750. The reason for Marwan moving his court to Harran is not known, but might be either to better monitor the troublesome eastern provinces of the caliphate or due to the anti-Christian sentiment of the city's pagan population, who had never been disloyal to the Umayyads. The move of the capital to Harran caused some outrage; the Banu Kalb tribe saw it as an abandonment of Syria and under Yazid ibn Khalid al-Qasri besieged the former capital of Damascus before being suppressed. Harran did not continue to function as a capital under the succeeding Abbasid Caliphate, though the city enjoyed some special privileges. When Al-Mansur (r. 754–775) ordered the destruction of the walls of all cities in northern Mesopotamia, Harran was a notable exception.

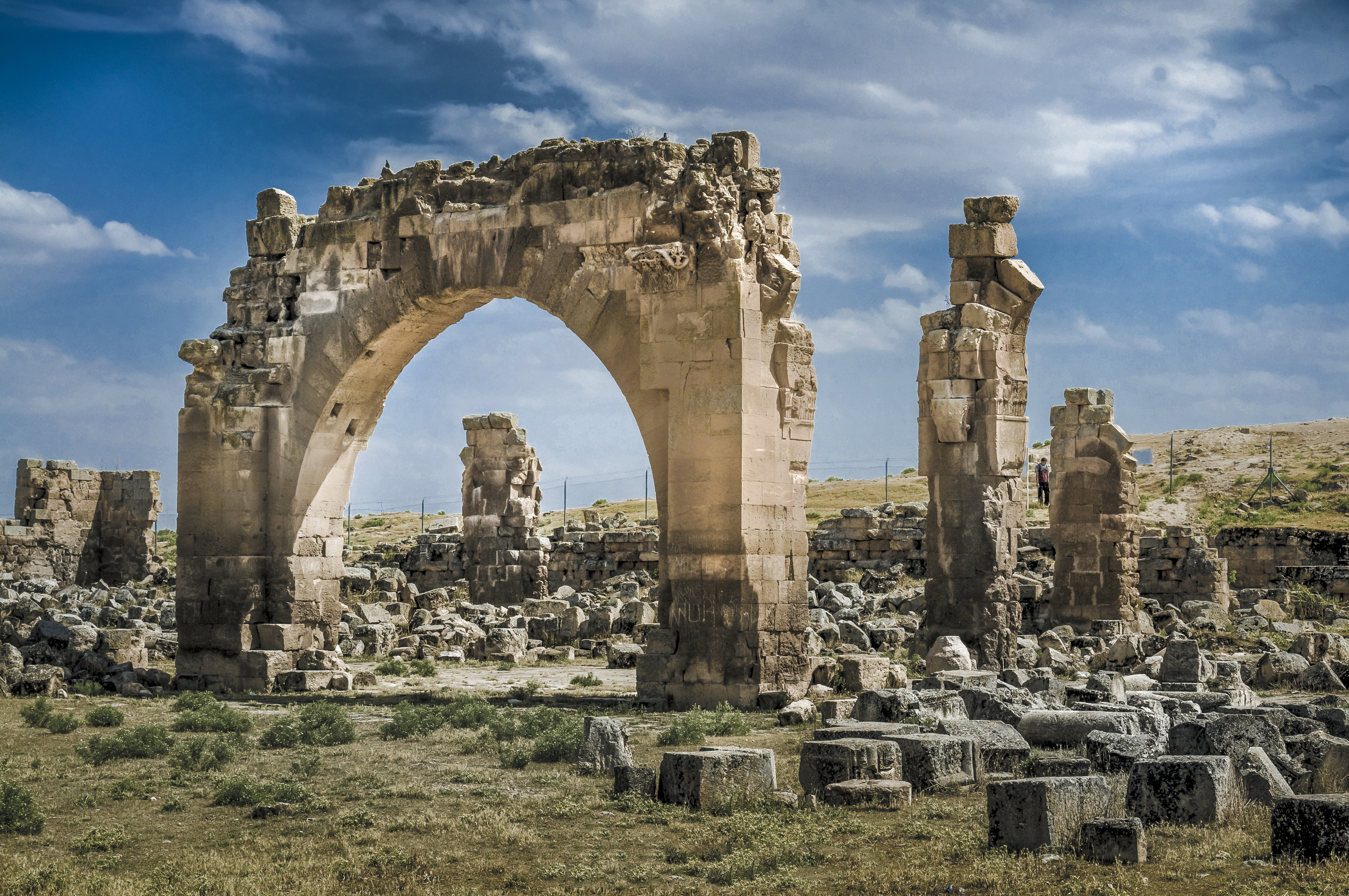
Ruins of the medieval Umayyyad Madrasa of Harran (717 CE)

The Madrasa of Harran underwent its golden age in the 8th century, particularly under the Abbasid caliph Harun al-Rashid (r. 786–809). (Note: Harun al-Rashid is also famous for founding the House of Wisdom in Baghdad, to which scholars from Harran would later be brought.) Many prominent scholars of this time were educated at the institution in subjects such as mathematics, philosophy, medicine and astrology. The school was also an important site for translations of documents from Syriac and Greek into Arabic and Harran flourished as a center of science and learning. Al-Rashid furthermore supplied Harran with a new water supply, constructing a canal from the Balikh River. At some point, Neoplatonism was introduced to Harranian intellectuals, though the precise timing is not clear. It might have been brought to Harran by the scholar Thābit ibn Qurra in the late 9th century, who could have learnt Neoplatonism in Baghdad. Alternatively, Neoplatonism might have been brought to Harran as early as the 6th century by Neoplatonists such as Simplicius of Cilicia, who fled persecution in the Byzantine Empire.

The local Harranian religion continued to develop as a blend of ancient Mesopotamian religion and Neoplatonism and Harran remained notorious for its strong pagan traditions long into the Islamic period. The city retained a highly heterogenous population that practiced many different religions. Some adopted syncretistic faiths tolerable by the Muslims, others continued to honor the old deities of ancient Mesopotamia and Syria, and some primarily worshipped the stars and planets. (Note: The medieval Harranian worshippers of astronomical objects continued to use ancient names for the celestial bodies, alternating between Greek, Akkadian and Aramaic names (the moon for instance continued to be known as Sīn).) The Harranian pagans considered themselves the heirs of ancient star-worshipping civilizations such as Babylonia, Greece, India, Persia and Egypt. In addition to pagans, Harran was also home to Muslims, Christians, Jews, Samaritans, Zoroastrians, Manicheans, and other groups.

In 830, Harun al-Rashid's son Al-Ma'mun (r. 813–833) arrived at Harran with an army on his way to raid in the Byzantine Empire and intended to destroy the city due to its large pagan population. Al-Ma'mun asked the populace if they were Muslims, Christians or Jews ("people of the book" protected under Islamic law). Unable to claim that they were, the people of Harran instead claimed that they were "Sabians", a mysterious religious group also protected according to the Quran but who no one at the time knew who they were. Upon being inquired who their prophet was, the Harranians claimed that their prophet was the legendary Hellenistic figure Hermes Trismegistus. There were many Islamic writers who saw through the claims of Harranians and still considered them to be pagans and not Sabians, and thus lacking any special right to toleration or protection. In 933, the Harranian pagans were ordered through a decree to convert to Islam, but a visitor to the city in the following year found that there were still pagan religious leaders operating a remaining public temple. Toleration of the pagans at Harran appears to have been renewed in the late 10th century.

Harran also had a significant Shi'i population, and was a center of Nusayri dawah (missionary) belonging to the ghulat current of Twelver Shi'ism, where Al-Khasibi established the first cells outside of Baghdad some time before 945. Around 962, however, Hamdanid prince Sayf al-Dawla removed the entire Shi'i population of the city to repopulate Aleppo after a Byzantine attack left the city devastated. The rural population around Harran, however, continued to subscribe to some form of Shi'ism, and mounted a series of uprisings as Hamdanid authority began to wane, particularly in the winter of 1032–1033.

==== Late Middle Ages ====
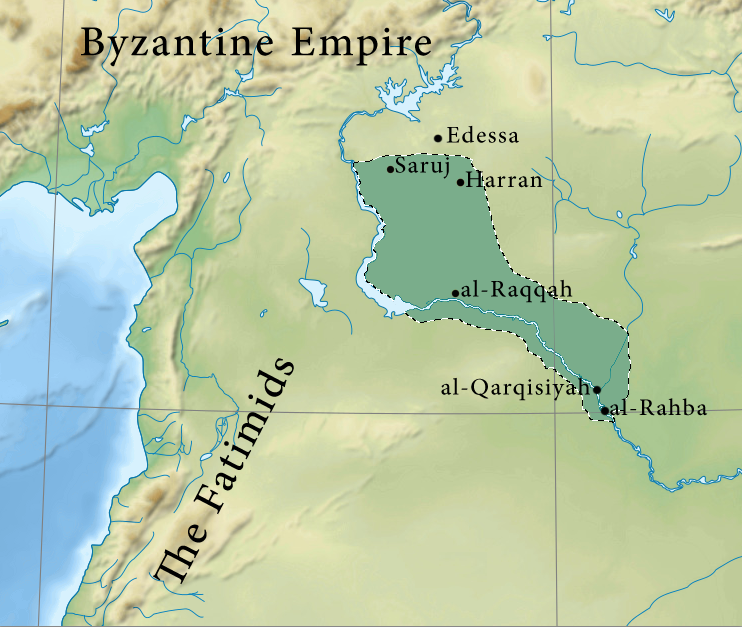
Harran served as the capital of the Numayrid Emirate (990–1081)

The power of the Abbasid Caliphate and its vassals in the region around Harran (the Hamdanid dynasty) declined at the end of the 10th century. A new local Arab Shi'i dynasty emerged during this time, the Numayrid dynasty, who ruled a small realm with Harran as its capital from 990 to 1081. The toleration of paganism at Harran was at last revoked for the final time in the 11th century and the last moon temples were closed and destroyed. The precise date when this happened and the events surrounding it are unknown, perhaps coinciding with the city falling under the control of the Fatimid Caliphate in 1038 through the submission of the Numayrid ruler Shabīb ibn Waththāb, or more likely with a failed anti-Uqaylid rebellion in 1083. Izz al-Din ibn Shaddad reported that a Sabian temple was destroyed by the Uqaylid dynasty governor Yahya ibn as-Shatir, who conquered Harran in 1081. In 1059, the Harran Castle, presumably constructed in Byzantine times, was rebuilt and strengthened by the Numayrid ruler Manīʿ ibn Shabīb. By the 1180s, Harran was fully devoted to Islam with little to no traces of its former moon cult. (Note: The Arab geographer Ibn Jubayr visited Harran in the 1180s and noted that he found no memory or trace of the famous moon cult.) The last "Sabians" migrated eastwards, to the region around Mardin and Mosul, and, as the specialist on the Yezidis Artur Rodziewicz has recently demonstrated, they joined the community centred in Lalish around Adi ibn Musafir, a descendant of the Umayyad lineage, which in time developed into the religious community of the Yezidis, in which elements of Harranian religion and cult can still be discerned to this day.

In the late 11th and early 12th century, political control in northern Mesopotamia and Syria was fragmented. Harran was an important city to the various local Muslim rulers as a counterweight to the nearby crusader states. Numayrid control of Harran came to an end in 1081 when the city was captured by the Uqaylid dynasty. It was then under the control of various Turkish princes; first Jikirmish of Mosul (1102–1106), then the Artuqids of Mardin (1106–1127) and then the Zengid dynasty, which captured Harran under Imad al-Din Zengi in 1127.

In the 12th century, Harran at times fell under the influence of the County of Edessa, a short-lived crusader state. There is no record of the crusaders ever conquering Harran but the Harran Castle preserves remnants of a Christian chapel with distinct crusader architecture, perhaps suggesting a peaceful crusader presence. The growth of Edessa under Christian rule contributed to the decline of Harran. Edessa is higher up the water table than Harran and as more wells were constructed in Edessa, those in Harran gradually dried up. Harran was in the 12th century still renowned for its ancient origins; a now lost work by Hammad al-Harrani made the claim that Harran had been the first city founded after the great flood.

Harran as it looked before its abandonment in the 13th century

Despite the threat of water scarcity, Harran continued to be an important town under the rule of the Ayyubid Sultanate, which followed the Zengids. Saladin (r. 1174–1193) at some point enlarged Harran's Grand Mosque and thereafter granted Harran to his brother Al-Adil I (later sultan 1200–1218). Al-Adil later gave Harran to his son Al-Kamil (later sultan 1218–1238). Harran was then under the rule of Al-Kamil's brother Al-Ashraf Musa 1202–1228/1229, after whose death the city steadily declined in importance. (Note: As an example, the revenue from Harran declined from three million dirhams under Musa to only two million in 1242, less than fourteen years after the end of his rule.) Harran was captured by Khwarazmians in 1237, driven from their homeland following the fall of the Khwarazmian Empire, but the castle was retained and fortified by the Ayyubid ruler As-Salih Ayyub though he soon had to give it up to broker a deal with the Khwarazmians for military aid against Badr al-Din Lu'lu' of Mosul. Harran was later regained from the Khwarazmians by the Ayyubids in 1240 by An-Nasir Yusuf of Aleppo.

Harran was captured by the Mongol Empire under Hulagu Khan in 1259 or 1260 through the peaceful surrender of its governor. The Harran Castle, as was traditional placed under a different governor, continued to resist for some time until one of the towers were breached. Under the Mongols, Harran continued to flourish for a few years as a major urban center. Mongol control of Harran was immediately contested by the Sultanate of Rum and the Mamluk Sultanate. The Mongols decided to abandon Harran in 1271, deporting the population to the nearby cities of Mardin and Mosul. Accounts differ concerning the reason for the abandonment and the state in which the city was left. One account states that the city had been damaged in a battle against the Turks in the year prior, motivating the abandonment, whereas another states that the Mongols themselves caused the damage during the abandonment. The Mongols are also variously stated to either have simply walled up the gates but otherwise left what remained intact or to have pillaged the city for building materials before burning down the remnants. One major reason for the abandonment was likely the decreasing water supply. It was impossible to sustain the population size of Harran with its water storage systems in disrepair and its wells no longer producing enough water. Another possible reason for the abandonment was the difficulty to retain and defend Harran and the little strategic value offered by the city in return.

=== Later history (1271–present) ===
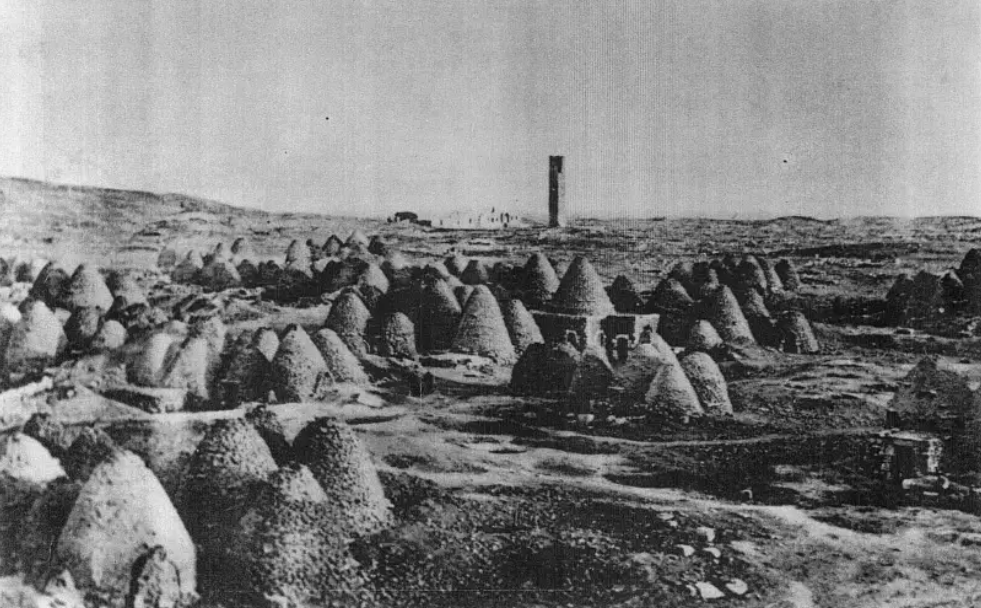
19th-century photograph of Harran

Harran was regained from the Mongols by the Mamluk Sultanate later in the 1270s. The Mamluks repaired the castle at some point, most likely in the 1330s or 1340s, and it became the seat of a local military governor, but there was otherwise little effort spent on trying to revive the city. By this point Harran was no longer on any of the major trade routes. A small village-sized settlement sprung up at the site, probably in the immediate vicinity of the castle. The space within Harran's city walls gradually filled up with dirt and sand through natural means. Over the centuries, few structures remained above the soil; the castle survived owing to its position on a hill and its continued use. The remnants of the mosque were also kept clear due to its religious and historical significance.

Under the Ottoman Empire, which captured the region in the early 16th century, Harran was the capital of a nahiyah (a local administrative unit composed of a group of villages). The demolished Harran University was repaired under the Ottoman sultan Selim I (r. 1512–1520) though it again declined in importance after his reign. The Ottomans continued to use the castle, and also built a new smaller mosque in the southern part of the city, but Harran gradually declined over the course of Ottoman rule and was eventually entirely abandoned as a permanent settlement.

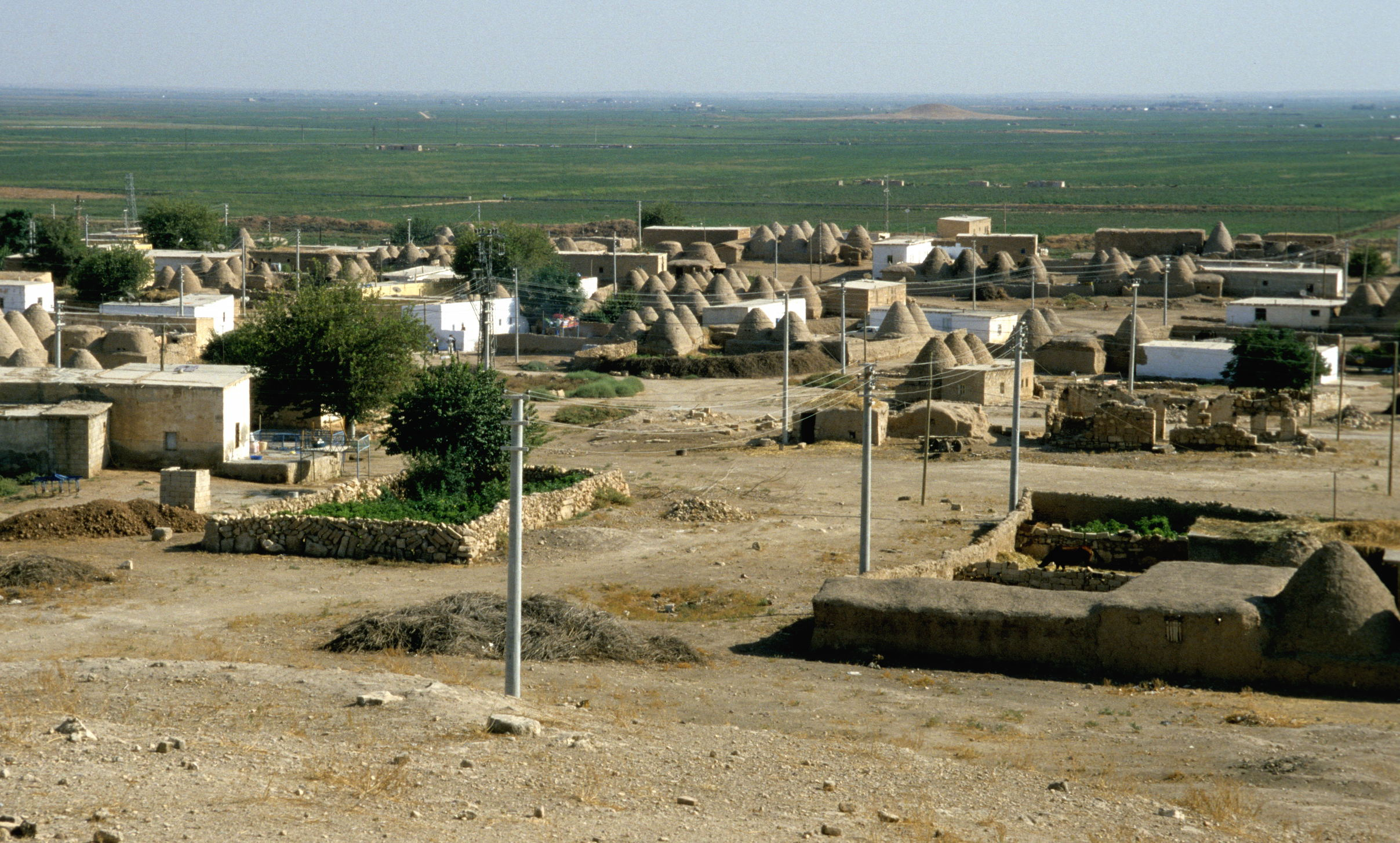
Part of the old town of Harran in 2001

Harran has over the last five hundred years mainly been used as a temporary settlement by local nomadic societies. One of the major semi-nomadic tribes that have continuously lived in and around Harran since the Middle Ages and still today are the Nmēr, (Note: Nmēr is a dialectal form of Numair.) descendants of the medieval Numayrid lords of the city. By the 1840s, Harran had once more become a semi-permanent village settlement, although the inhabitants spent the summer months encamped outside the village to avoid vermin in their houses. By the middle of the 20th century, Harran comprised about a hundred houses, inhabited by semi-settled nomadic Arabs, most of whom still did not stay at the site for the duration of the entire year. The city's ancient water systems had long fallen into disrepair and Harran in the 20th century had only a single source of drinking water, Jacob's Well, about 1.6 kilometres (0.99 miles) west of its walls. Although six wells were still operational within the ancient walls they only produced brackish water and were thus only useful for providing water to animals. The water at Harran had perhaps been contaminated from seeping saltpeter from its ancient ruins.

Since the middle of the 20th century, Harran has re-transitioned into a permanently inhabited settlement due to local advancements in irrigation and agriculture. Particularly important in this development was the Turkish Southeastern Anatolia Project, launched in the 1970s, which through irrigation efforts transformed the formerly dry desert plains surrounding Harran into productive agricultural fields. Harran received its own plan for future development in 1992. The ruins of the ancient city were placed on the Tentative list of World Heritage Sites in Turkey in 2000. Accelerated economic and demographic growth in Harran is expected to in the future once more transform Harran into an important local center. Economic issues caused by the Syrian civil war across the nearby Syrian border has recently caused many Harranian families to migrate elsewhere for work, such as to the cities Urfa (ancient Edessa), Adıyaman and Gaziantep.

== Town ==
=== Monuments and ruins ===
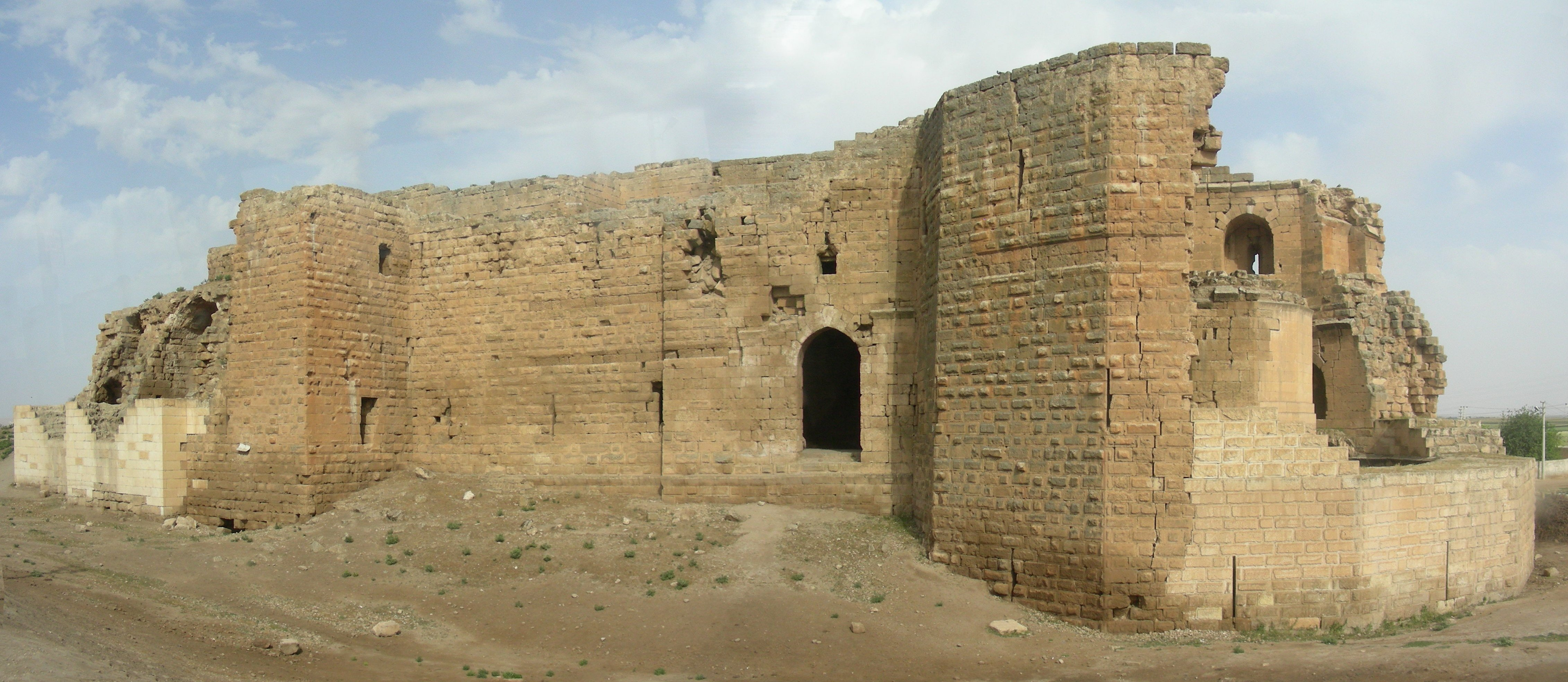
Partially reconstructed ruins of the Harran Castle

The Harran Castle is a large brick fortress of unknown date, though ancient Greek inscriptions found at one of its gates suggest that it was founded at some point during Byzantine rule (4th–7th centuries). It is also possible that it was built under Muslim rule in the 9th century. If it was not built in the 9th century, it is likely to at least have been expanded in the early Islamic period. Before its fall into ruin, the castle was a three-story structure. It was probably initially a palace but was converted into a more castle-like militaristic building in the 11–13th centuries when the region surrounding Harran experienced considerable political turmoil. The castle has recently been partially excavated and reconstructed with the support of the Turkish Ministry of Culture and Tourism.

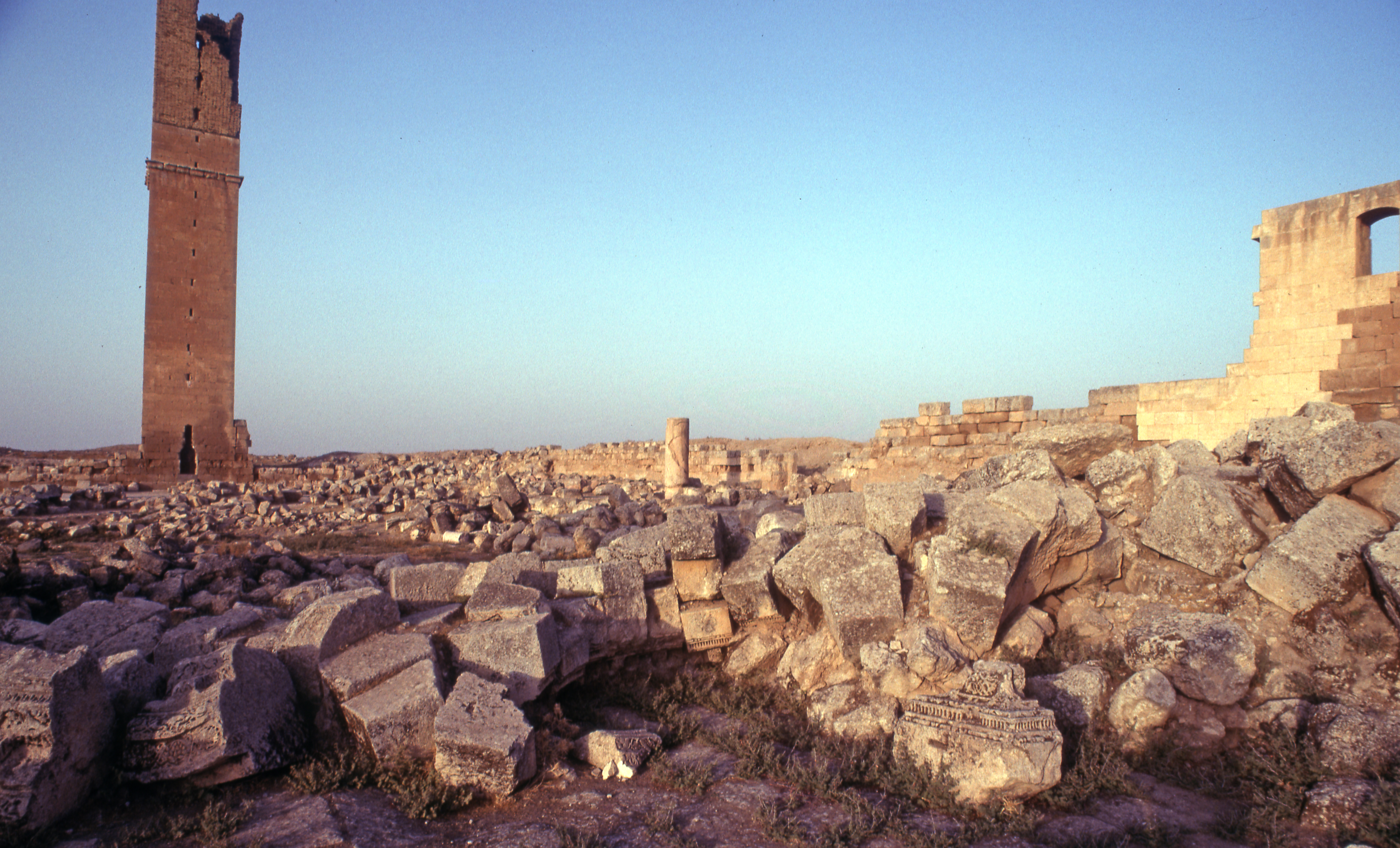
Harran Grand Mosque

Harran was the site of the oldest mosque built in Anatolia, known as the Grand Mosque or Paradise Mosque. The mosque was built by the Umayyad caliph Marwan II in 744–750, at the time the city was his capital. The masonry of the mosque indicates that it was restored several times throughout its history. Measuring 104 by 107 metres (341 ft × 351 ft) at its height, the mosque has fallen into ruin over the centuries and little of it remains standing today. Remaining portions include the eastern wall, the mihrab, a fountain, and the 33.3-metre (109-foot) tall minaret.

Another important historical monument in Harran is its ancient burial mound, spread over a large area and partially surviving intact at the center of the city's archaeological site. The burial mound preserves inscriptions and architectural elements from several different cultures and appears to have been in continuous use from the 3rd century BC to the 13th century AD. The burial mound may be older than Harran itself since ceramic dated to c. 5000 BC has been found at the site.

The precise location of the ancient great Eḫulḫul temple is unknown and no certain archaeological evidence of it has yet been found. It is likely that one of the major medieval buildings of Harran displaced the Eḫulḫul and were constructed on top of it, either the Harran Castle or the Grand Mosque. Writings from the Islamic period contradictingly claim that the castle or the mosque were the converted moon temple. The castle being on the site of the ancient temple is further supported by its higher elevation whereas the mosque is further supported by the finds of Babylonian inscriptions and four stelae of Nabonidus among its ruins. These inscriptions and stelae directly mention the Eḫulḫul. Additionally, the remains of an ancient altar with moon iconography have also been recovered from the ruins of the mosque. As a result, the mosque enjoys more scholarly support as the most likely site of the ancient temple.

=== City walls ===
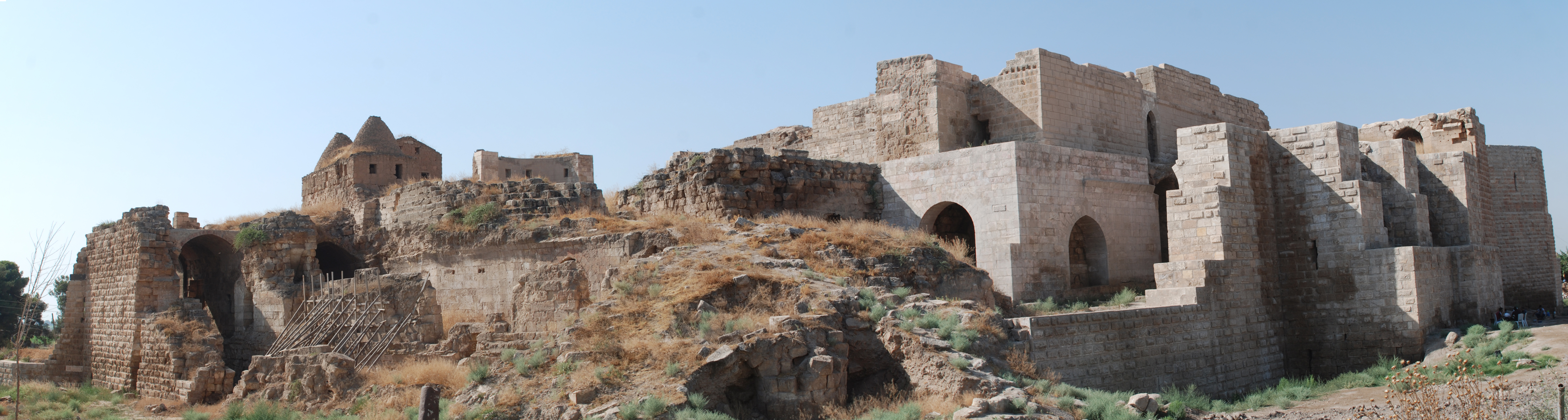
Harran's city walls and castle

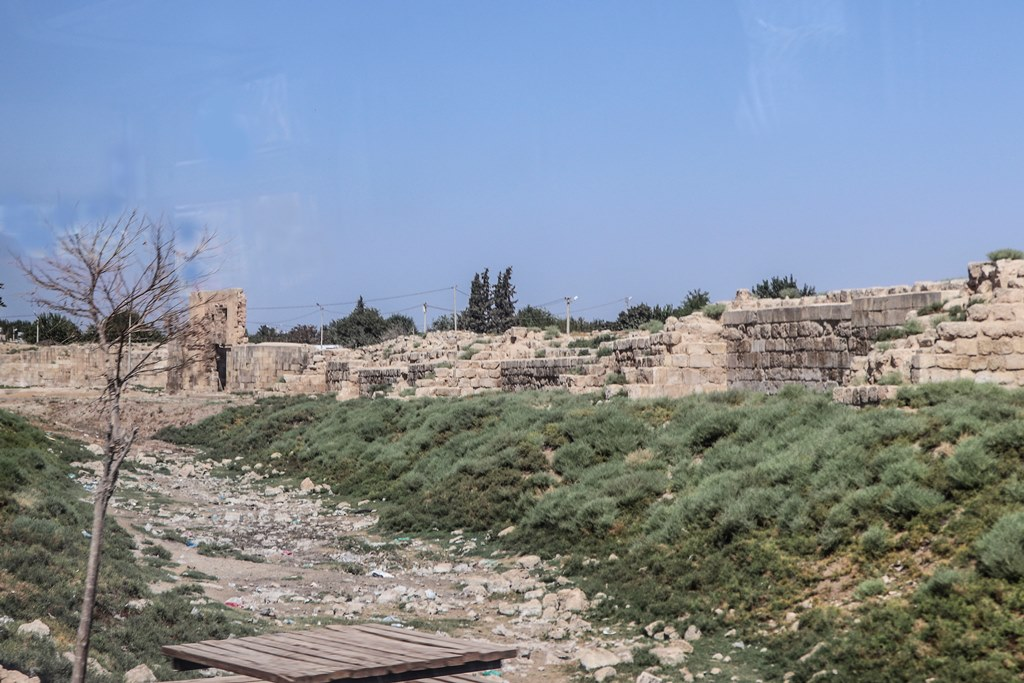
Harran city walls

The old town of Harran is still largely surrounded by Harran's ancient city walls. Though they are in generally poor condition, some stretches are well-preserved in good condition and give an idea of how the settlement once looked. The exact date of the current walls and which of the many cultures that have inhabited Harran constructed them is not known. The walls were most likely constructed under either Roman or Byzantine rule. Inscriptions in both Greek and Syriac have been discovered during excavations of parts of the walls.

The walls of Harran resemble those of the nearby Edessa, though are slightly smaller. They are vaguely elliptical in layout, normally around 3 metres (9.8 feet) thick and approximately 4.5 kilometres (2.8 miles) long and 5 metres (16 feet) high. Before they fell into ruin, the walls had 187 bastions and 6–8 gates, most of which are in ruined condition today. Only one of the medieval gates of Harran, the Aleppo Gate, remain standing today. The walls were once surrounded by a great moat filled with water.

=== Beehive houses ===
Harran mainly attracts attention today due to the distinctive vernacular architecture of the houses in its old town, known as beehive houses (kümbets). This building type is not seen elsewhere in Turkey and is rare in the rest of the world. Houses similar to the modern beehive houses have long been present in Harran; the earliest known buildings from Harran appear to have been circular and Assyrian reliefs from the 7th century BC depict domed buildings architecturally similar to the present beehive houses. They have not been consistently present on the site, instead being built, ruined, forgotten and rebuilt multiple times throughout Harran's history. Beehive houses were recorded at Harran by the 12th-century explorer Ibn Jubayr but not by the 17th-century explorer Evliya Çelebi.

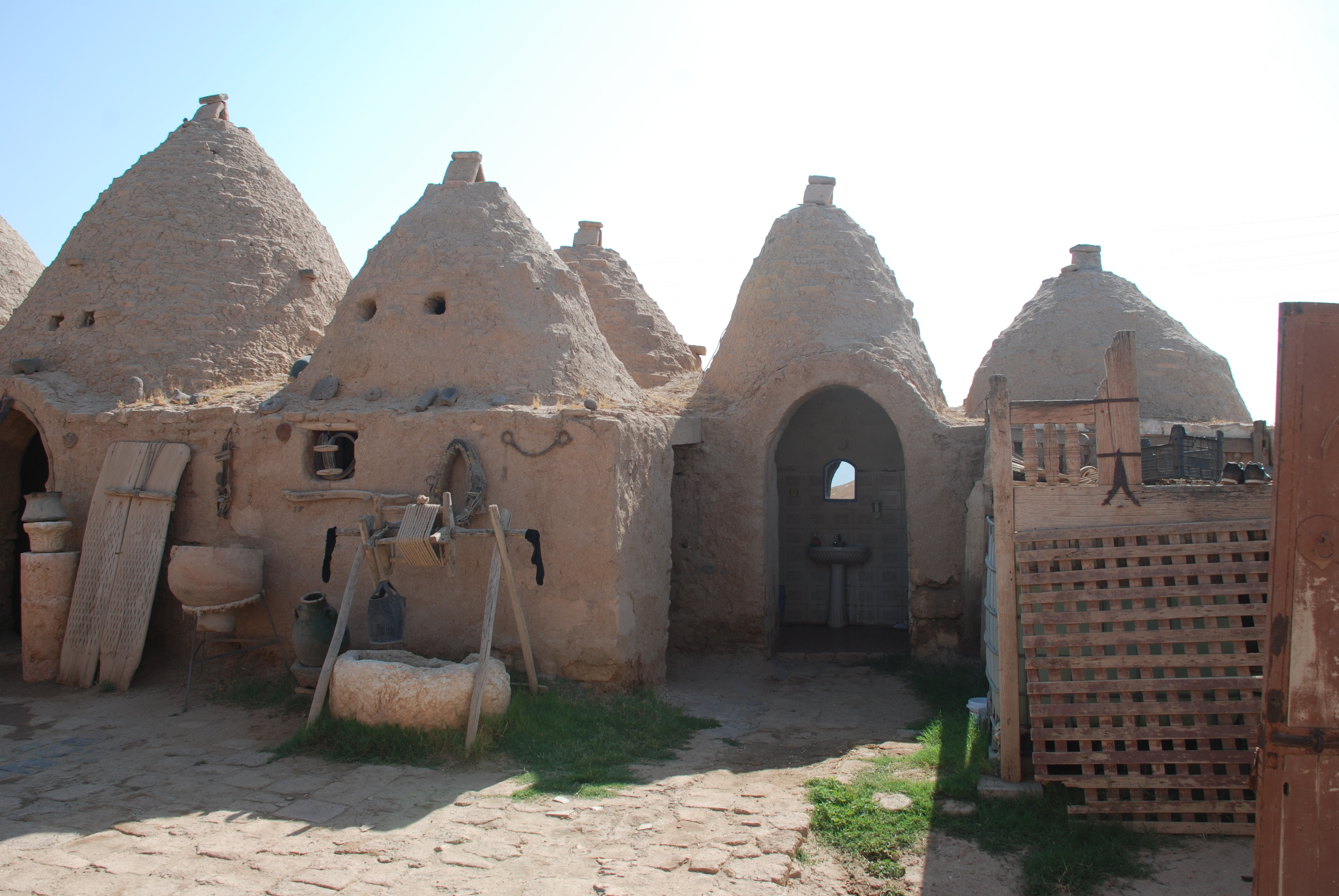
Harranian beehive house

The majority of the present beehive houses in Harran date to the early twentieth century and none have been standing for longer than since the mid-19th century. The architecture of the beehive houses has subtly changed since the twentieth century; photographs from that time show the houses erected on the grounds like tents whereas the present conical domes are built on larger cubical bases.

Since wood is rare in the region around Harran owing to its climate, locals have traditionally built houses from materials they could easily gather such as stone, brick and mud. The modern beehive houses were constructed by locals who learnt how to build them by examining excavated ancient buildings and used bricks gathered from the ruins as building material. The beehive houses were compatible with the nomadic lifestyle of the locals since they can be built and dismantled rapidly, like a tent, but also efficiently resist both heat and cold. Because of the weak materials used for plastering the beehive houses require repair every 1–3 years. Their walls are usually 50–60 centimetres thick and their domes are about 20–30 centimetres thick. The domes have an opening at the top which provides natural air circulation and ventilation. This feature, combined with the thick walls, provide relatively good indoor conditions throughout the year, even in the extreme summer heat.

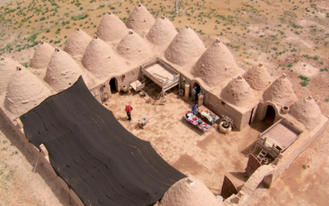
The Harran Culture House

As of a count conducted in 2002, Harran had 2,760 beehive houses though the number in the old town has since declined to a few dozen. Some of the beehive houses remained inhabited until the 1980s but they are today mainly used as store houses and barns and have been under conservation since 1979. One of the oldest extant buildings in Harran is a beehive complex that today serves as the Harran Culture House (Harran Kültür Evi), a local museum and restaurant. The Culture House building was originally built c. 1800 but fell into ruins at some point and was rebuilt for tourism purposes in 1999. The museum showcases artefacts as well as traditional jewelry and clothes from the region surrounding Harran.

=== Modern buildings ===
Since prohibitions relating to conservation of historical monuments has hindered locals from gathering building materials from the ancient ruins since the 1950s, newer houses constructed in Harran are mostly concrete structures with no architectural relation to the beehive houses. Concrete houses have been built both alongside beehive houses and outside the ancient city walls. The majority of the population of Harran today live in a more newly constructed village about 2 kilometres (1.2 miles) from the old city center.

== Geography and climate ==
Harran is located in the Southeastern Anatolia Region of Turkey, approximately 40 kilometres (25 miles) southeast of Urfa. Harran is situated 360 metres (1,180 feet) above sea level, which is the lowest point in the surrounding lowland region.

Harran has a hot and dry climate. The precipitation rate is rarely more than 40 centimetres. During the summer, Harran experiences significant temperature differences between the days and nights.

== Composition ==
There are 136 neighbourhoods in Harran District:

- 15 Temmuz
- Ağcıl
- Ahmetkara
- Akkuş
- Alacalı
- Algılı
- Altılı
- Aralı
- Arın
- Aşağı Yeşilova
- Aşağıkesmekaya
- Aşağıyakınyol
- Aşağıyarımca
- Aslankuyusu
- Avlak
- Aydıncık
- Aydınlar
- Aydüştü
- Balkat
- Balkır
- Başak
- Başkaragöz
- Batıkonacık
- Bellitaş
- Bilgili
- Binekli
- Birelismet
- Bozceylan
- Bozyazı
- Buğdaytepe
- Bükdere
- Buldum
- Bulgurlu
- Büyüktaşlıca
- Büyüktürbe
- Çağbaşı
- Çaltılı
- Çatalhurma
- Çepkenli
- Cevizli
- Ceylangözü
- Çiçek
- Çiftçiler
- Çolpan
- Cumhuriyet
- Damlasu
- Dayanıklı
- Demirli
- Diriliş
- Doğukesmekaya
- Doğukonacık
- Doruç
- Duran
- Emekli
- Eskiharran
- Gazlıkuyu
- Giyimli
- Gögeç
- Gökçe
- Göktaş
- Gözcü
- Güllübağ
- Gürgelen
- Hazreti İmambakır
- Huzurlu
- Hz.Yakup
- İbniteymiye
- İmambakır
- Kabataş
- Karataş
- Kaymaklı
- Kılıçlı
- Kırmıtlı
- Kökenli
- Koyunluca
- Küçük Ekinli
- Küçükminare
- Küçükyıldız
- Küplüce
- Kuruyer
- Kütüklü
- Kuyukent
- Meydankapı
- Minare
- Miyanlı
- Oğulcuk
- Öncüler
- Ortakonacık
- Özbay
- Özlüce
- Öztaş
- Öztürk
- Parapara
- Sadak
- Sade
- Saide
- Seferköy
- Şehit Ali Aydar
- Selalmaz
- Serince
- Şeyhhayatiharrani
- Soylu
- Şuayipşehri
- Sugeldi
- Şükürali
- Süleymandemirel
- Sütlüce
- Suvacık
- Tahılalan
- Tanınmış
- Tantana
- Taylıca
- Tekdal
- Tekneli
- Toytepe
- Tozluca
- Tüccariye
- Türkoğlu
- Üçdirek
- Uluağaç
- Ünlü
- Uzunyol
- Varlıalan
- Yakacık
- Yardımlı
- Yaygılı
- Yayvandoruk
- Yenice
- Yenidoğan
- Yeşilova
- Yolgider
- Yukarıkesmekaya
- Yukarıyakınyol
- Yukarıyarımca
- Yünlüce
- Zeytindalı

== Demographics ==
Historical population
Year	Pop.	±% p.a.
1990	29,592	—
1997	40,664	+4.65%
2007	58,734	+3.75%
2012	72,939	+4.43%
2017	85,319	+3.19%
2022	96,072	+2.40%
Source: 1990 census, 1997 census and TÜIK (2007–2022)

In its most prosperous periods in ancient and medieval history Harran was probably home to around 10,000–20,000 residents.

As a result of Harran's retransition into a permanent settlement over the course of the late 20th century and early 21st century, the city and surrounding district has experienced a rapid population increase. Despite this, Harran retains predominantly rural characteristics. As of 2022, Harran had a population of 96,072. The Harran district ranks 857th among 872 districts in Turkey, and last among the districts of the Şanlıurfa Province, by socioeconomic development. As of 2009, Harran has a low unemployment rate (2.73%; 753rd among all districts), a low literacy rate (55.16%; 865th among all districts) and a high population increase rate (64.23%; 7th among all districts). Harran's possibilities for development are subject to several limiting factors, including the amount of productive land and the relatively limited area reserved for urban development.

In his seyahatnâme from the 17th century, Evliya Çelebi mentioned that the vicinity of Harran was inhabited by Bedouins of Qays and Mawali tribes. The local culture is predominantly Arabic in terms of lifestyle, clothing and food. Harran has close social, cultural, commercial and urban relations with Urfa, the capital of the Şanlıurfa Province. The majority of the district's population is composed of tribal Arabs.

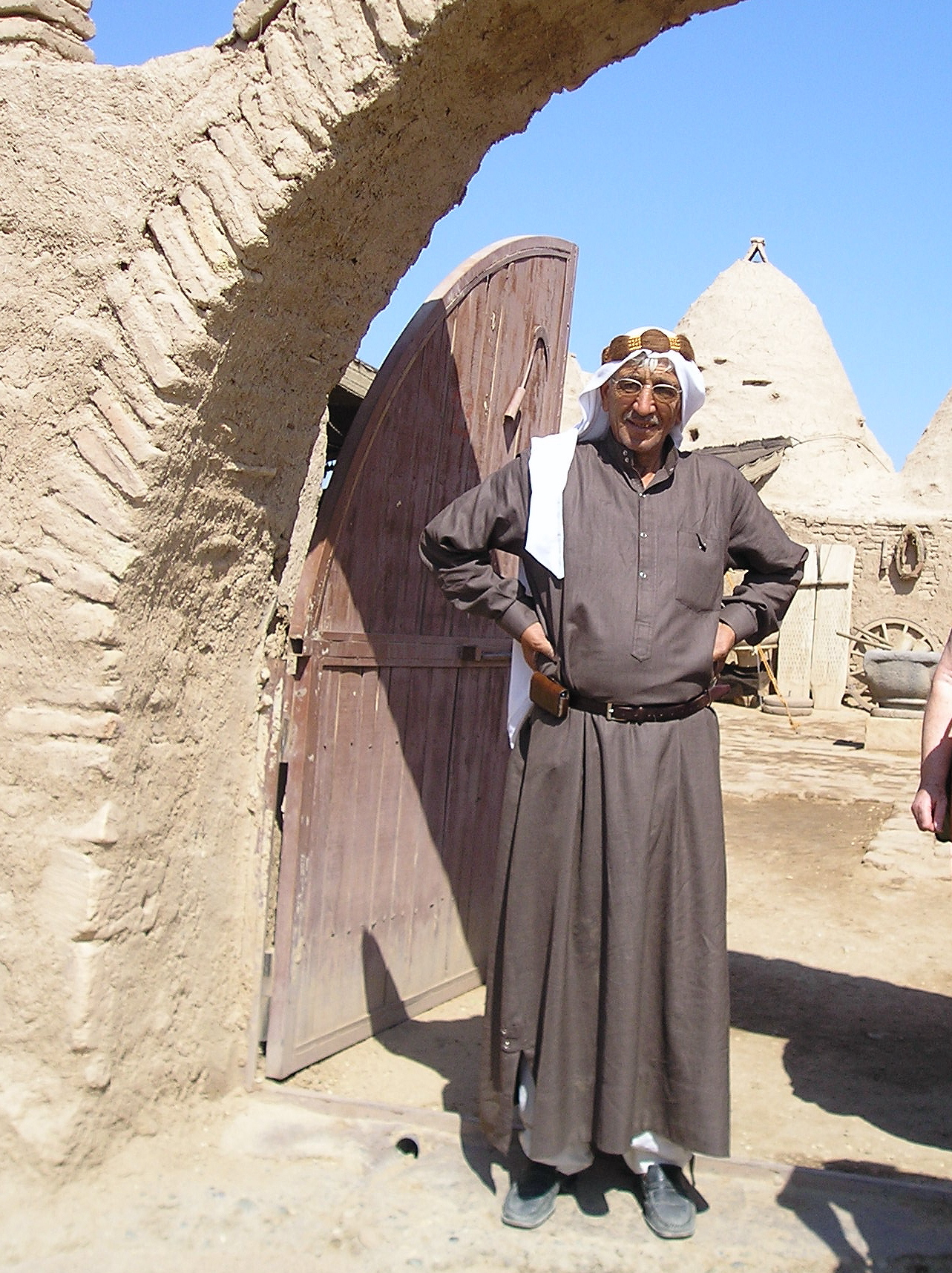
A man from Harran

=== Language ===
According to the census conducted by Turkey in 1927, 88.0% of the population spoke Arabic as their mother tongue; 6.8% Kurdish, and 5.2% Turkish. In 1998, the majority of the population of Harran spoke Turkish; approximately 19% spoke Arabic and 10% spoke Kurdish.

== Tourism ==
The ancient ruins at Harran function like an open-air museum and the town is a popular local tourist attraction, often visited as a day trip from Urfa. Popular attractions include the Harran Culture House and the ruins of the castle and mosque. Prior to 2015, Harran had around two thousand visitors a year, according to a local tour guide. The Syrian civil war has reduced this to almost zero.

== Politics ==
Mayors of Harran
#	Mayor	Term	Party
1	İbrahim Özyavuz	1994–2009	AK Party; MHP
2	Mehmet Özyavuz	2009–2019	AK Party
3	Mahmut Özyavuz	2019–present	MHP

Harran was established as a district in 1987 and divided into three neighbourhoods. Harran first participated in the Turkish local elections in 1989, though there were no mayoral candidates at that time. The 1989 election was a close election between three parties; the True Path Party (DYP) received 36.1% of the vote, the ANAP received 35.8% and the Social Democratic Populist Party (SHP) received 28.1%.

İbrahim Özyavuz of the AK Party and later the Nationalist Movement Party (MHP) served as Mayor of Harran for three terms from 1994 to 2009, achieving victory in the local elections of 1994, 1999 and 2004. İbrahim Özyavuz was defeated in the local elections of March 2009, beaten by Mehmet Özyavuz of AK Party who achieved 54.2% of the vote. Mehmet Özyavuz retained his position as mayor for a second term winning the local elections of March 2014, receiving 55.5% of the vote.

Since 31 March 2019, the Mayor of Harran is Mahmut Özyavuz of the MHP, who won in the local elections of March 2019 with 54.9% of the vote, defeating the incumbent Mehmet Özyavuz of the AK Party. Mahmut Özyavuz is the son of İbrahim Özyavuz.

== Archaeology ==
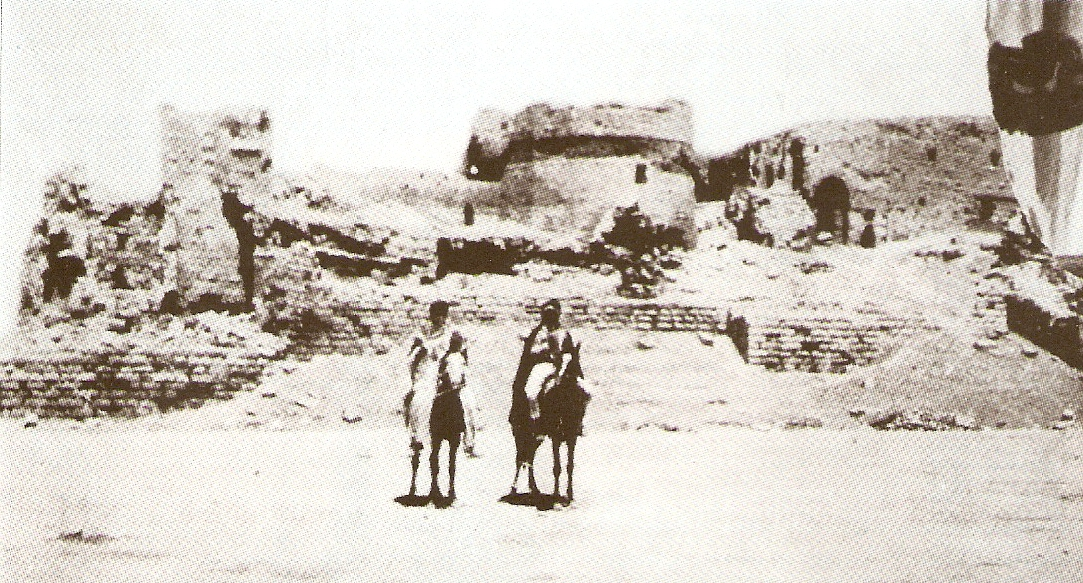
Photograph of the ancient city walls of Harran by T. E. Lawrence

Although Harran was of great interest to historians due to its association with the ancient moon cult and its abundant appearances in Mesopotamian, Roman and Arab historical writings, the site itself did not receive significant archaeological attention until the 19th century owing to its geographical remoteness. Harran first garnered attention in 1850 when it was visited by some members of Francis Rawdon Chesney's Euphrates Expedition. Harran was also visited by the missionary George Percy Badger in 1852 and by Eduard Sachau in 1879, who sketched some of the ruins. In 1911, Conrad Preusser published a brief but accurate study of the ruins of the Harran Castle and K. A. C. Creswell included a detailed survey of the remains of the Grand Mosque in his 1932 book Early Muslim Architecture Volume I. Harran was also visited and photographed by T. E. Lawrence ("Lawrence of Arabia"). None of these early visitors conducted excavations and instead only observed the ruins and remnants visible on the surface.

Seton Lloyd, William C. Brice and C. J. Gadd led a three-week archaeological expedition at Harran in the summer of 1950. Results from a further archaeological survey conducted by R. Storm Rice were also published in 1952. Lloyd, Brice, Gadd and Rice mainly confined themselves to surveying Harran and clearing rubble. Rice's work did however reveal the extent of the original city walls and their gates. During later digs in 1956 and 1959, Rice also excavated the ruins of the Grand Mosque. The site was later visited by H.J.W. Drijvers (who authored Cults and Beliefs at Edessa) in the 1970s and by Tamara Green (who authored The City of the Moon God) in 1977, but both only observed previously reported discoveries and did not dig for any new material. Excavations at Harran have thus continued to be very limited, partly due to its remote and at times politically tumultuous location and partly due to the difficulty for foreign archaeologists to work in Turkey.

In 2012 and 2013, the Şanlıurfa Museum Directorate, with Mehmet Önal acting as consultant, carried out more extensive excavations at Harran, focusing on the walls, burial mound and castle. The excavations were mainly for restoration purposes on the western part of the city wall and uncovered the walls, towers and bastions. In excavations in the northern part of the castle, a gallery and crenellated corridor were discovered on the west side, with several artefacts of interest. In 2014, following a decision of the Council of Ministers and courtesy of the Ministry of Culture and Tourism, further excavation work was conducted, again under the direction of Önal. This round of excavations uncovered a bathhouse, a bazaar, public toilets, a perfumery shop and workshop. In 2016, further excavations were carried out on the city wall, revealing new parts of the wall and leading to the discovery of a broken statue of a woman with a Syriac inscription and a male relief, both used as spolia in the wall. Excavations of the west side of the castle carried out in 2014–2016 uncovered a crenellated corridor belonging to a second defense system adjacent to the wall of the castle and further excavations in 2017–2018 in the southern part of the castle located remnants of a bathhouse.

== Notable people ==
- Oracle of Nusku, Assyrian prophetess (fl. 671–670 BC)
- Adad-guppi, Assyrian priestess (c. 648–544 BC)
- Nabonidus, last Neo-Babylonian king (r. 556–539 BC)
- Jabir ibn Hayyan, alchemist and author (d. 806/816)
- Asad ibn al-Furat, jurist, theologian and general (c. 759–828)
- Thābit ibn Qurra, mathematician, astronomer and translator (826/836–901)
- Al-Battani, mathematician and astronomer (c. 858–929)
- Sinān ibn al-Fatḥ, mathematician (10th century)
- Hammad al-Harrani, scholar, poet and traveller (11th–12th century)
- Ibn Hamdan, scholar and judge (1206–1295)
- Ibn Taymiyyah, jurist and theologian (1263–1328)

== See also ==
- List of cities of the ancient Near East
- List of ancient settlements in Turkey
- List of municipalities in Şanlıurfa Province
- History of Mesopotamia
- History of Anatolia
