= Anatolius (Osroene) =

Anatolius (Greek: Ανατόλιος, died c. 579/580) was a Byzantine official, active in the reign of Tiberius II Constantine (r. 574–582). He was a topoteretes (deputy) of the praetorian prefecture of the East and praeses (provincial governor) of Osroene. He was accused of being a crypto-pagan and consequently executed.

== Sources ==
Primary sources about him include Evagrius Scholasticus, and John of Ephesus. There are mentions of him in the works of Michael the Syrian and Nikephoros Kallistos Xanthopoulos.

== Biography ==
Anatolius was apparently a man of humble origins. He eventually rose to high office, gaining in political significance. Evagrius Scholasticus reports: "Anatolius, who was originally one of the vulgar and an artisan, but had subsequently, by some means or other, obtained admission into public offices and other posts of importance." He lived for some time in Antioch, which was renamed at the time Theopolis ("City of God"). He conducted his business in the city and was personally acquainted with Patriarch Gregory of Antioch (term 571–593). Evagrius remarks "In this city he was pursuing his engagements, from which resulted an intimacy with Gregory, president of that Church, and frequent visits to him, partly for the purpose of conversing on matters of business, and partly with a view to obtain greater influence on the ground of his intercourse with the prelate."

By 579, Anatolius had risen to his highest post. John of Ephesus describes Anatolius as "archon and deputy praetorian prefect" (Greek: ἄρχων καὶ ὰντιὐπαρχος) at Edessa. This would make him a topoteretes (deputy) of the Praetorian prefecture of the East and praeses (provincial governor) of Osroene, of which Edessa was the capital. One of the Novellae Constitutiones ("New Constitutions") mentions the topoteretes of Osroene and Mesopotamia. This was the post Anatolius held and the reference might be to Anatolius himself.

=== Arrest ===
In 578, the Byzantine authorities received reports on an impending revolt of crypto-pagans in Baalbek. Theophilus, an official who had previously faced revolts by Jews and Samaritans, was tasked with locating said crypto-pagans. Suspects were arrested and interrogated under torture, forced to name other "pagans". Soon Theophilus had lists of names, including prominent citizens spread throughout the eastern provinces of the Byzantine Empire. The persecution spread to the rest of these provinces.

Theophilus was searching for Rufinus, a high priest of the pagans, who "had lately gone on a visit to Anatolius". Theophilus followed the man to Edessa. He claimed to have interrupted a sacrifice to Zeus/Jupiter taking place within the city. John of Ephesus relates, "On their arrival they [Theophilus and his escort] learned that he [Rufinus] was dwelling there, and having waited for night, upon surrounding the house in order to arrest him, they found a feast of Zeus actually being celebrated by the heathens, and people assembled together with Rufinus to offer sacrifices. On becoming aware, however, that they were endeavouring to surround the house, those present took the alarm, and fled. But Rufinus knowing well that he had no place of refuge to which he could escape, drew his knife, and smote it into his heart, and having given himself also a wound in the abdomen, fell down dead."

Theophilus captured "a gouty old man, too feeble to flee, and an old woman". The two were interrogated under threat of death, forced to declare "the names of all who had taken part in these proceedings". They supposedly named several people, but only Anatolius is named in primary sources. Anatolius reportedly tried to create an alibi for himself. He hastily dressed himself in the typical clothes of a traveller (travelling coat, leather leggings and walking shoes) and then made a late-night visit to the residence of the Bishop of Edessa, pretending to have just returned from a journey. He hoped that the Bishop would testify about his supposed journey.

Anatolius' trick failed. He was soon arrested and forced to give surety to appear in Antioch for his trial. John of Ephesus explains: "For just as he [Anatolius] left the bishop's presence, those who had been sent to arrest him met him, and laid hands upon him, and said, 'Come peaceably with us, my lord governor: we are greatly in need of your highness: give orders for bailsmen to be put in for you at a talent apiece, that within ten days you appear at Antioch.' But he in answer began to explain to them, and say, ' I have but just entered the city from a journey, as the bishop will bear testimony.' But they replied, ' It is no use playing us tricks, my lord governor. This very night you have been with Rufinus and the rest of your people, and have offered sacrifice to Zeus; and the witnesses are all ready to prove it.' And when upon this he threatened them with his power, and said, 'You are putting a stop to all matters of state;' they replied, 'Threaten us not, my lord governor: as your highness is a living man, you will not get away from hence without giving us bail.' And now finding that he had no choice, nor probability of escape, he consented, and gave bail, and set out immediately with them and their other prisoners for Antioch."

=== Trial ===
Anatolius originally faced trial at Antioch, alongside his notarius (secretary) Theodore. He protested his innocence and tried to prove being a genuine Christian. He led people into his private residence, where they were able to examine an icon of Jesus Christ. At the back of the icon however they reportedly found "skilfully introduced ... a likeness of Apollo, so carefully done as not to be visible without looking closely at it. Horrified at the sight, the archers threw him [Anatolius] on the ground, and kicked him, and dragged him by the hair to the Praetorium, where they declared all that had happened". He was forced to make a full confession.

Meanwhile, Theodore was subjected to torture and flagellation. His confession did not only implicate himself and Anatolius: he also accused Gregory of Antioch and Eulogius of Alexandria (later a patriarch, term 581–607) of participating in a human sacrifice. John of Ephesus narrates: "That both Gregory, the patriarch of Antioch, and Eulogius, who was subsequently patriarch of Alexandria, had been present with them at the sacrifice of a boy, held by night at Daphne". Daphne was a suburb of Antioch. Theodore died in prison. Contemporary rumour had it either "that really he was murdered, in order that his deposition might be got out of the way; but to the truth of this we will not bear testimony" or "as many thought, he killed himself, because the sentence of death was certain to be pronounced against him."

Anatolius was transported to Constantinople to face a new trial, now judged by a special assembly. John of Ephesus reports that all accused crypto-pagans arriving at Constantinople were placed on trial by "a court ...consisting of magistrates and jurists, to try them, and examine into the truth of the matter, upon oath that they would show no partiality, nor respect of persons." The trials took place within the Placidia Palace and proceedings were kept secret. John notes: "Although a few facts transpired, it was in spite of their own efforts to conceal them. And after some time, men generally were convinced that bribery was permitted, and prevailed over the truth".

The population of Constantinople started rioting, demanding no mercy for the prisoners. Among their slogans was: "Out with the bones of the heathens!" Tiberius II Constantine reacted by adding to the members of the court every member of the Senate available, presumably to make decisions more respected. He [Tiberius] "gave orders to all magistrates and senators to assemble together, in company with all men of patrician rank, and the subconsuls, and those who bear the title of 'illustrious', and the subprefects of the city, and all members of the senate. The place appointed for their meeting was the prefect's court, and all the depositions relating to the heathen were to be read before them, both of cases in the east and in the west; and whosoever was not present he gave orders that his girdle should be cut, and he should lose his office. In obedience to so strict a commandment they all met, and sat the whole day from morning till night fasting, and anxious". Anatolius' fate was left at the hands of this extended court, which would suggest that Anatolius was himself a member of the Senate, perhaps even a vir illustris ("illustrious man", high-ranking senator).

=== Execution ===
The new court's "first sentence was to condemn to death him of whom we have spoken before, Anatolius". He was first tortured. Evagrius claims that Anatolius attempted to again implicate Gregory of Antioch but failed: "on being subjected to the extreme of torture, [Anatolius] was unable to allege anything against the bishop".

Anatolius was then thrown to the "wild beasts" of the Hippodrome of Constantinople. They wounded him but were not allowed to kill him. His jailers had him "torn from their claws" and then crucified. Evagrius argues that Anatolius suffered impalement, then details the fate of his corpse. "Anatolius himself, after being first exposed to the wild beasts in the amphitheatre and mangled by them, was then impaled, without terminating even then his punishment in this world; for the wolves, tearing down his polluted body, divided it as a feast among themselves; a circumstance never before noticed."

John mentions that an unnamed son of Theodore was seized by the crowds and burned alive. He might be part of the unnamed associates of Anatolius mentioned by Evagrius: "He [Anatolius] and his associates were the cause of still greater disturbances and a general rising of the populace: for, when some of the party had received sentence of banishment instead of death, the populace, inflamed with a sort of divine zeal, caused a general commotion, in their fury and indignation, and having seized the persons condemned to banishment and put them into a skiff, they committed them alive to the flames; such being the people's verdict."

Evagrius alludes to an unnamed "curator of the palace" who had protected Anatolius for a while, but changed his mind. This could be a curator domus divinae ("curator of the divine domains", administrator of the private property of the imperial family). Whitby has suggested that the man could be Magnus, known to have been curator of the palace of Hormisdas during the reign of Tiberius II Constantine. Magnus was from Syria, held an important financial office and could have had "close contacts with Anatolius".

== Interpretation ==
=== Sources and reliability ===
Michael Whitby examines the reliability of the primary sources. He points that Evagrius Scholasticus could have been present at Antioch and a first-hand witness to the events. He might also have access to the accounts of other witnesses and contemporaries, but notes that Evagrius' account is sketchy at best on the early stages of the scandal. He focuses more on the implication of Gregory of Antioch and the threat to the Patriarch. His account of events contains many "divine signs". On the other hand, John of Ephesus' version offers a wealth of "circumstantial information" and even includes mention of the official records. He views events from a Monophysite perspective but seems more credible in this case.

Whitby also points out that Evagrius' account is lacking in context. John of Ephesus places Anatolius' arrest and trial among the events of the wider religious persecution. Whitby notes that the persecution started in Baalbek, which he describes as "a notoriously pagan city". He deduces that Christians had found it impossible to break the "monopoly of power", concentrated at the hands of the wealthy pagans of the city. This might have instigated the investigation of Theophilus and the entire affair. He also points to the house where Rufinus resided at Edessa, which Whitby deduces to have been the residence of Anatolius, making it hard for the governor to deny his connection to the high priest.

Whitby notes that Evagrius and John both feature an account of an icon helping condemn Anatolius, but that their accounts are completely different. Evagrius account offers the following miracle: "Anatolius rushed to a certain image of the Mother of God, which was suspended by a cord in the prison, and folding his hands behind his back, announced himself as a suppliant: but she, in detestation and conviction of the guilty and God-hated man, turned herself quite round, presenting a prodigy awful and worthy of perpetual remembrance; which, having been witnessed by all the prisoners as well as by those who had the charge of Anatolius and his associates, was thus published to the world".

=== Implications concerning Gregory ===
Returning to Evagrius' account, Whitby notes the role of Gregory in the events. Evagrius has claimed in previous passages that Gregory was popular and respected in Antioch, but then Evagrius himself records riots in Antioch aimed at the Patriarch, predating the scandal with Anatolius. Once Gregory was implicated in the alleged human sacrifice, "great attacks were made on him by the people". Evagrius was obviously sympathetic to Gregory, but the evidence points to Gregory facing a general hostility within his seat of power. His association with Anatolius was arguably unfortunate for both of them.

Concerning the alleged human sacrifice, Whitby notes that John has the sacrifice immediately followed by "a terrible quaking". This seems a likely reference to the earthquake which affected Antioch in 577. The event is otherwise only recorded by Evagrius. Evagrius records: "In the third year of the administration of the empire by Tiberius [577], a violent earthquake befell Theopolis [Antioch] and its suburb of Daphne, precisely at noon; on which occasion the whole of that suburb was laid in utter ruin by the shocks, while the public and private buildings in Theopolis, though rent to the ground, were still not entirely levelled."

=== Pagans in the 6th century ===
Concerning events at Constantinople, Whitby notes that the population had a reason to fear that the prisoners would get light sentences. Tiberius II Constantine had a reputation for "leniency in religious matters". A previous chapter of John has Tiberius even tolerating Arianism until a riot had forced him to renew persecution. Under constant threat of popular riots, the tolerant Tiberius turned into a persecutor of pagans and heretics. Whitby even makes direct allusions to the Inquisition when describing this wave of persecution.

John Liebeschuetz sees the events as a regular "witch-hunt", where everyone is a suspect. He points out that many of the "pagans" executed were probably actual Christians. Whitby is not so certain. He points to the hagiography of Simeon Stylites the Younger, a contemporary of Anatolius, which alludes to the existence of prominent pagans in Antioch and its vicinity, with some of them even consulting the saint. Besides practicing pagans, this might indicate that there were people in the area "whose religious position was still ambivalent".

Liebeschuetz and other modern historians point to the involvement of the Monophysites in these events. The last reign favorable to them was that of Anastasius I (r. 491–518). Since 518, they were seen as heretics, with "their churches and monasteries ... liable to be confiscated, and their bishops to be exiled and imprisoned". Yet, they participated enthusiastically in the search for crypto-pagans. They were probably seeing it as an opportunity to discredit their enemies, since many of the "suspects" happened to be prominent Chalcedonians.

Antigone Samellas points out the term used by Evagrius for the corpse of Anatolius: "polluted". That is the Greek term "miaron", deriving from miasma. This would suggest that Christians considered impure "the bodies of pagans who had been making sacrifices to the gods". She notes an earlier passage of Basil of Caesarea which describes the relics of Jewish martyrs as abominable. She deduces that this was the general attitude against "everything that one's religious opponents regarded as sacred".

== Sources ==
- Liebeschuetz, John Hugo Wolfgang Gideon (2001). The Decline and Fall of the Roman City. Oxford University Press. ISBN 0-19-926109-1.
- Martindale, John R.; Jones, A.H.M.; Morris, John (1992), The Prosopography of the Later Roman Empire, Volume III: AD 527–641, Cambridge University Press, ISBN 0-521-20160-8
- Payne Smith, R.; John of Ephesus (1860), Ecclesiastical History, Part 3. A New Translation from the Greek, Oxford University Press
- Samellas, Antigone (2002), Death in the eastern Mediterranean (50-600 A.D.): the Christianization of the East : an interpretation, Mohr Siebeck, ISBN 978-3-16-147668-6
- Walford, E.; Evagrius Scholasticius (1846), Ecclesiastical History, A New Translation from the Greek, Samuel Bagster and Sons
- Whitby, Michael; Evagrius Scholasticus (2000), The ecclesiastical history of Evagrius Scholasticus, Liverpool University Press, ISBN 978-0-85323-605-4
