= Gregory of Antioch =

Patriarch of Antioch from 571 to 593

- Eastern Orthodox Patriarch of Antioch
- Church: Eastern Orthodox Church
- See: Antioch
- Installed: 571
- Term ended: 593
- Predecessor: Anastasius I of Antioch
- Successor: Anastasius I of Antioch

Gregory of Antioch was the Eastern Orthodox Patriarch of Antioch from 571 to 593.

Gregory began as a monk in the monastery of the Byzantines in Jerusalem, or so we learn from Evagrius Scholasticus. He was transferred by the emperor Justin II (565-578 ) to Sinai. He was abbot there when the monastery was attacked by Arabs. John Moschus mentions he was also abbot of Pharan in Palestine. In 569-70 he became Patriarch of Antioch after Justin II deposed the Patriarch Anastasius I of Antioch.

In 578, Anatolius accused Gregory of being a crypto-pagan involved in the sacrifice of a boy, but recanted "on being subjected to extreme of torture" In another account, but by John, Bishop of Ephesus a contemporary of Gregory, we are informed that the latter was a pagan and had attended the sacrifice of a boy held by night at Daphne. In learning this the populace were after Gregory who was besieged in his palace and was unable to celebrate the Chrism Mass on Maundy Thursday. The King and his advisors thought “that for the honour of Christianity, and that the priesthood might not be exposed to scorn and blasphemy, the matter must be hushed up”, and the riot was quelled. Through the intercession of others he was able to ingratiate himself with the Patriarch of Constantinople; John the Faster, and retained his See, although he had lost respect of the populace (226-227).

Gregory was an influential figure, who quarrelled with the Count of the East and was subjected to official harassment and "enquiries" in consequence, including his appearance in court in Constantinople some time before 588, but he was acquitted through the intercession of others (supra). When Roman troops fighting the Persians mutinied in the time of the emperor Maurice I, Gregory was asked to mediate.

When Chosroes II of Persia was obliged to flee to the Romans for safety early in his reign, Gregory of Antioch and the Metropolitan Domitian of Melitene, were sent to meet him. His services were evidently acceptable; when Chosroes regained his kingdom, he sent Gregory the cross which had been earlier carried off from Sergiopolis by Chosroes I. After this, Gregory made a tour of the border lands to convert Monophysites to the Chalcedonian definitions. He died in 593-4 from taking a drug, intended to relieve gout. His predecessor Anastasius I of Antioch then become Patriarch once more.

Five homilies have reached us.

== Sources ==
- Meyendorff, John (1989). Imperial unity and Christian divisions: The Church 450-680 A.D. The Church in history. Vol. 2. Crestwood, NY: St. Vladimir's Seminary Press. ISBN 9780881410563.
- Angelo di Berardino (ed.), Adrian Walford (tr.), Patrology: The Eastern Fathers from the Council of Chalcedon (451) to John of Damascus (+750). Cambridge: James Clarke & Co. 2006. Hbk. Pp. xxxiii + 701. ISBN 0-227-67979-2.
