= Anastasius I of Antioch =

Patriarch of Antioch from 561 to 571 and 593 to 599

- Patriarch of Antioch and All East
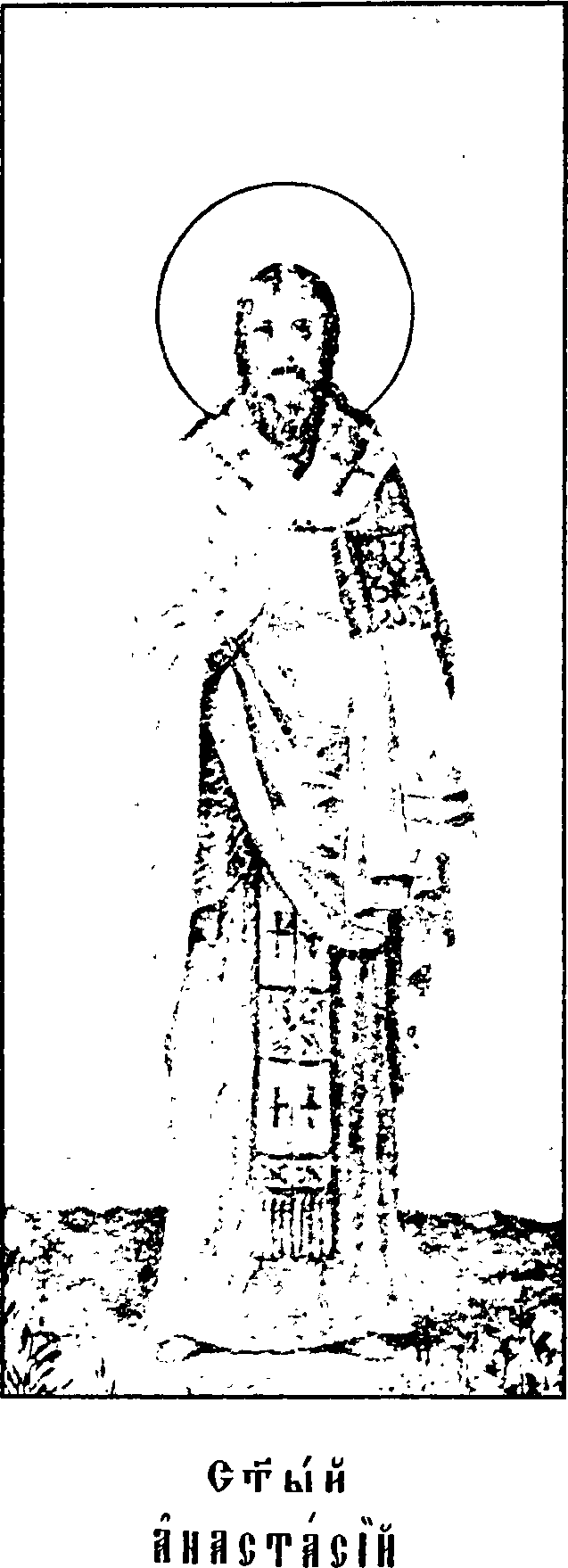
- Church: Chalcedonian Christianity
- See: Antioch
- Installed: 561, 594
- Term ended: 571, 599
- Predecessor: Domnus III of Antioch, Gregory of Antioch
- Successor: Gregory of Antioch, Anastasius II of Antioch

Anastasius I of Antioch was the Patriarch of Antioch twice (561–571 and 593–599).

Alban Butler calls him "a man of singular learning and piety". He was a friend of Pope Gregory I, and aroused the enmity of the Emperor Justinian by opposing certain imperial doctrines about the Body of Christ (Justinian favoured the Aphthartodocetae). He was to be deposed from his see and exiled when Justinian died; but Justin II carried out his uncle's purpose five years later in 570, and another bishop, Gregory of Antioch, was put in his place. But when Gregory died in 593, Anastasius was restored to his see. This was chiefly due to Pope Gregory the Great, who interceded with the Emperor Maurice and his son Theodosius, asking that Anastasius be sent to Rome, if not reinstated at Antioch.

From some letters sent to him by Gregory, it is thought that he was not sufficiently vigorous in denouncing the claims of the Patriarch of Constantinople to be a universal bishop.

There is some confusion about the date of his death. According to Theophanes, he was disembowelled by the Jews of Antioch, who forced him to eat his intestines in 599. His feast day is 21 April. An alternative version is that Anastasius died in 598, and was succeeded by another bishop by the same name, to whom the translation of Gregory's Regula Pastoralis is attributed, and who is recorded as having been put to death in an insurrection of the Jews. However, Nicephorus (Hist. Eccl., XVIII, xliv) declares that these two are one and the same person.

The same difficulty occurs with regard to certain Sermones de orthodoxa fide, some ascribing them to the latter Anastasius; others claiming that there was but one bishop of that name.

At the Second Council of Nicaea, a letter of Anastasius was read, in which he drew a distinction between the worship due to God, and the respect which is rendered to men and angels, saying that humans serve God alone.

== Sources ==
- Meyendorff, John (1989). Imperial unity and Christian divisions: The Church 450-680 A.D. The Church in history. Vol. 2. Crestwood, NY: St. Vladimir's Seminary Press. ISBN 9780881410563.
