= Danişment =

Danişment is a Turkish place name and it may refer to:

- Danişment, Yenipazar a village in Yenipazar district of Bilecik Province
- Danişment, Aydın a village in the central district of Aydın Province
- Danişment, Bayburt a village in the central district of Bayburt Province
- Danişment, Kurucaşile a village in Kurucaşile of Bartın Province
- Danişment, Nallıhan a village in Nallıhan district of Ankara Province
- Danişment, Yüreğir a village in the central district (Yüreğir) of Adana Province
- Danişment, Balya
- Danişment, Biga
- Danişment, Horasan
- Danişment, Ilgaz
- Danişment, Keşan
- Danişment, Osmancık

== See also ==
- Danishmends
- Danishmend Gazi
