= Karaahmetli =

Karaahmetli is a Turkish place name and may refer to the following places in Turkey:

- Karaahmetli, Erdemli, a village in Erdemli district of Mersin Province
- Karaahmetli, Eşme, a village in Eşme district of Uşak Province
- Karaahmetli, Tirebolu, a village in Tirebolu district of Giresun Province
- Karaahmetli, Yüreğir, a village in Yüreğir district of Adana Province
