= Dedepınarı =

Dedepınarı can refer to:

- Dedepınarı, Elâzığ
- Dedepınarı, Yüreğir
