= Yüreğir =

- District and municipality
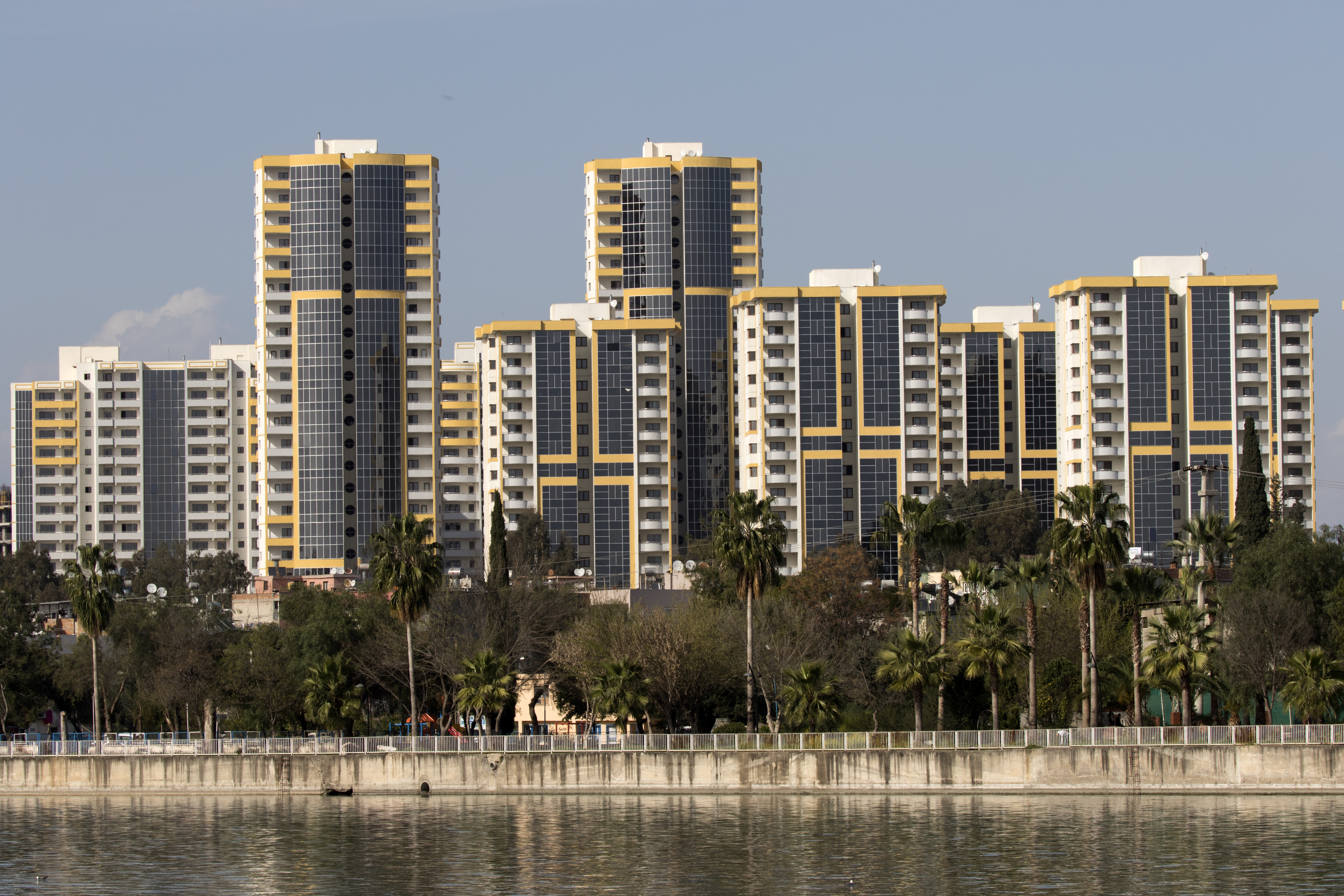

- Map showing Yüreğir District in Adana Province

- Location within Turkey
- Coordinates: 36°59′34″N 35°22′35″E
- Country: Turkey
- Province: Adana

Government
  - Mayor: Ali Demirçalı (CHP)
- Area: 835 km^{2} (322 sq mi)
- Elevation: 27 m (89 ft)
- Population (2024): 399,910
  - Density: 479/km^{2} (1,240/sq mi)
- Time zone: UTC+3 (TRT)
- Postal code: 01
- Area code: 0322
- Website: www.yuregir.bel.tr

Yüreğir (Turkish: [jyˈɾejiɾ]) is a district-municipality of Turkey's Adana Province. It is the second most populated district of the province, with a population of over 400,000, mostly concentrated on the east side of the Seyhan River, within the city of Adana. Many of the provincial institutions are located in Yüreğir, including the Provincial and Regional Courts of Justice, Health Directorate, Social Security Directorate and Agriculture Directorate.

Yüreğir covers the area between the Seyhan River and the Ceyhan River, south of the Sarıçam and north of the Karataş districts. Yüreğir shares parts of the Seyhan River with Seyhan district and parts of the Ceyhan River with Yumurtalık district.

== Etymology ==
Yüreğir is an Üçok tribe of Oğuz Turks, a western Turkic people whom most of the Anatolian Turks were descended from. Yüreğir tribe flee from Mongol invasions who invaded their plain land in Transoxiana between Amu Darya (Turkish: Ceyhun) and Syr Darya (Turkish: Seyhun). With the permission from Mamluk Sultanate, they settled in the Levant. Taking advantage of the conflicts within the Armenian Kingdom of Cilicia, they moved upwards to Cilicia in 1352 and settled at the plain between Sarus and Pyramus rivers, an area that resembles their homeland in Transoxiana. They renamed Sarus as Seyhan, Pyramus as Ceyhan and the plain they settled became known as Yüreğir plain.

== History ==
Yüreğir plain until the early 19th century, was made up of villages that were connected to the city through Taşköprü. During the Egyptian rule of Cilicia (1833-1840), Alawites settled in Verâ-yı Cisr, just across the bridge, which became the first expansion of the city to the east side of Seyhan river. During the first half of the 20th century, many manufacturing plants were built at the Yüreğir plain. The Hermann Jansen urban plan east of the river that was never actualized and the slow zoning process that was the authority of central government in Ankara, caused many unplanned neighborhoods to be built around the manufacturing plants by the workers that got the jobs. Incirlik Air Base was built in 1951 east of the area. Çukurova University was founded in 1973 north of Yüreğir plain.

Metropolitan Municipality Law that was introduced in 1989, split Adana into two districts, and Yüreğir district was founded east of the river. In 2008, north part of Yüreğir, became a new district under the name of Sarıçam.

== Governance ==
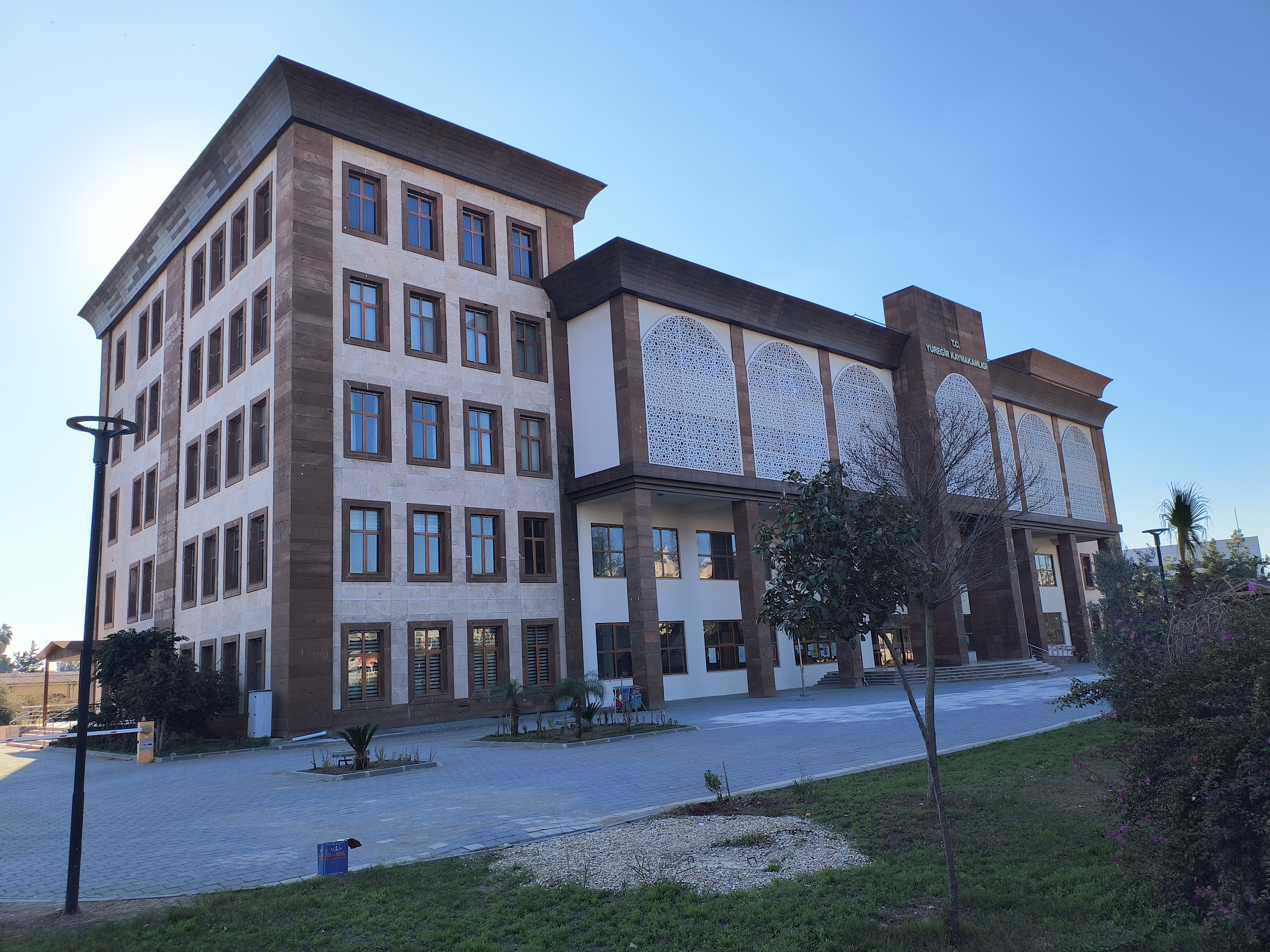
District Hall

Yüreğir district is administered by three levels of government; central government, provincial administration and the Yüreğir Municipality.

Yüreğir Governorship is the district branch of the central government operating under the Adana Governorship. The chief executive of the Yüreğir district is the District Governor who is appointed by the Ministry of Internal Affairs. Yüreğir Governorship overseas the functioning of the district directorates of the ministries.

Yüreğir directorate of the Adana Province Special Administration is the district branch of the provincial administration. Yüreğir district is represented with 8 members at the 61-member Adana Provincial Parliament.

Yüreğir district is divided into urban neighbourhoods and former villages which are now called rural neighbourhoods.

=== Yüreğir Municipality ===
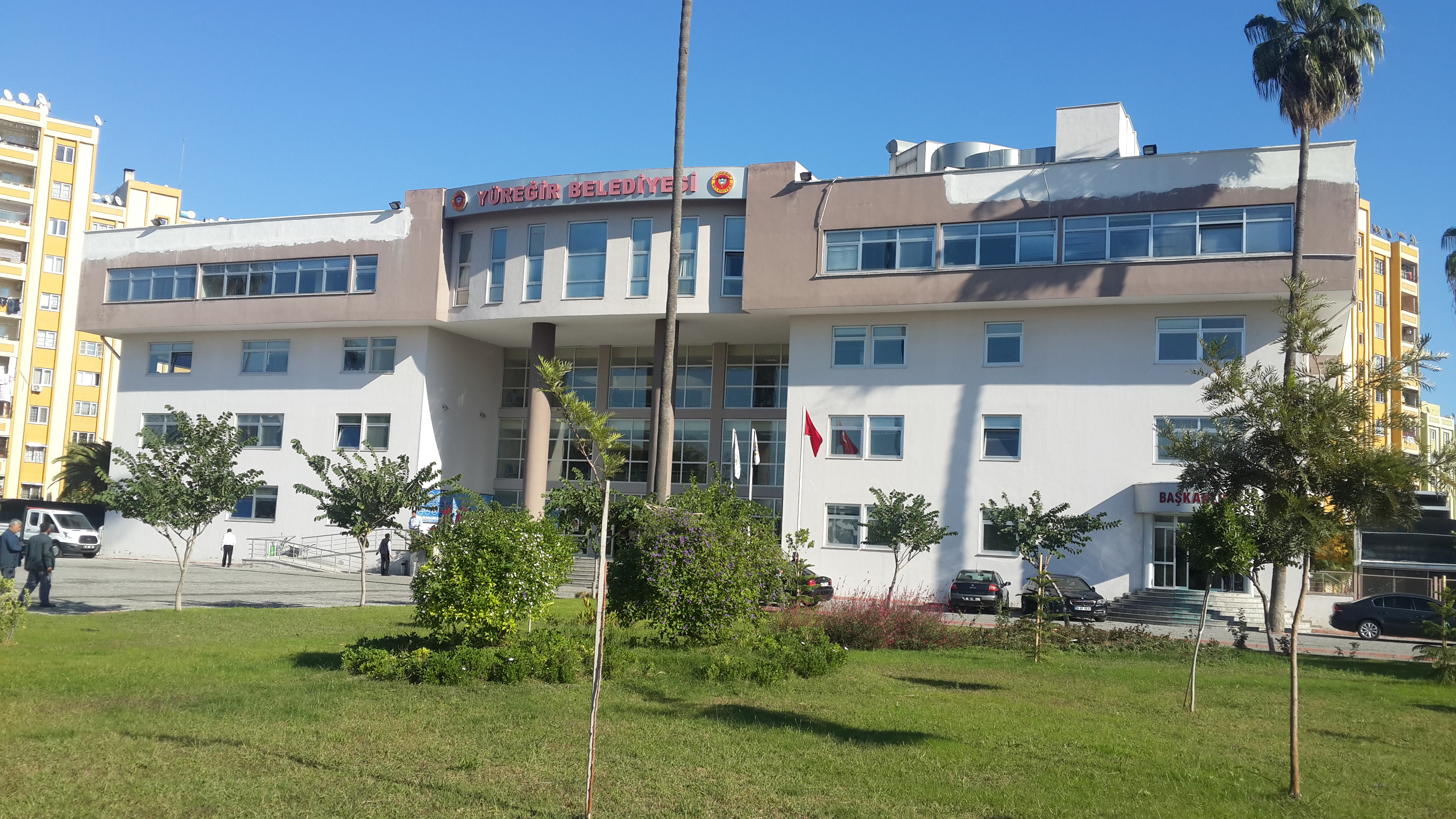
Municipality Hall

Yüreğir Municipality was incorporated in 1986 as a lower-tier municipality as Adana Municipality is upgraded to a metropolitan status. The organs of the Yüreğir Municipality are the mayor, encümen (the executive committee) and the municipal council.

Mayor is the chief executive of the municipality, presides municipal departments and chairs the municipal council. Mayoral candidates are either nominated by National Parties or run independently. The mayor is elected by first past the post voting for a five-year term. Ali Demirçalı is the mayor of Yüreğir since April 2024.

Encümen is the executive committee of the Yüreğir Municipality.The mayor presides the encümen and the committee consists of 7 members, 3 councilors elected from the municipal council, 3 department directors appointed by the mayor and the treasurer.

Municipal Council is the decision making organ of the Yüreğir Municipality. It is responsible for approving by-laws, founding, splitting or amalgamating neighbourhoods, strategic planning, urban development planning and zoning, making investments, budgeting, loaning and controlling the mayor's activities. The chair of the council is the mayor. The council consists of 37 members. The candidates for the councilor positions are either nominated by National Parties or run independently. The councilors are elected by the d'Hondt method, where the whole municipality is one electoral district and there is 10% threshold for a party to gain seat at the council. As with the mayor, councilors are elected for a five-year term. The conservative AKP leads the council with 20 members, the left-leaning CHP has 9 members, and the far-right Turkish nationalist MHP has 8 members on the council.

=== Neighbourhoods ===
Neighbourhoods (Mahalle) are administered by the muhtar and the Neighbourhood Seniors Council consisting of 4 members. Muhtar and the Senior Council are elected for 5 years at the local elections and are not affiliated with political parties. Neighbourhoods are not an incorporation therefore do not hold government status. Muhtar although being elected by the residents, acts merely as an administrator of the district governor. Muhtar also voices the neighbourhood issues to the municipal hall together with the Seniors Council.

According to the Law No. 5747, published in the Official Gazette dated March 22, 2008, issue number 26824 (Duplicate), and effective from March 22, 2008, certain neighborhoods belonging to the Yüreğir district have been transferred to the Sarıçam district within the boundaries of the metropolitan municipality, along with amendments made to certain laws.

There are 107 neighbourhoods in Yüreğir District:

- 19 Mayıs
- Abdioğlu Cumhuriyet
- Ağzıbüyük
- Akarcalı
- Akdam
- Akdeniz
- Akıncılar
- Akpınar
- Alihocalı
- Anadolu
- Atakent
- Atatürk
- Aydıncık
- Bahçelievler
- Başak
- Belören
- Beyköy
- Büyükkapılı
- Çağırkanlı
- Camili
- Çamlıbel
- Çatalpınar
- Çelemli
- Çine
- Cırık
- Çotlu
- Cumhuriyet
- Dadaloğlu
- Danışment
- Dedekorkut
- Dedepınarı
- Denizkuyusu
- Dervişler
- Doğankent Bahçelievler
- Doğankent Cumhuriyet
- Doğankent Kışla
- Düzce
- Eğriağaç
- Esenler
- Eski Misis
- Gazipaşa
- Geçitli Cumhuriyet
- Gökçeli
- Gümüşyazı
- Güneşli
- Güveloğlu
- Güzel Cumhuriyet
- Güzelevler
- Hacıali
- Havraniye
- Havutlu
- Haydaroğlu
- Herekli
- Irmakbaşı
- Kadıköy
- Kamışlı
- Karaahmetli
- Karacaoğlan
- Kaşlıca
- Kayarlı
- Kazım Karabekir
- Kiremithane
- Kışla
- Köklüce
- Köprügözü
- Köprülü
- Koza
- Kütüklü
- Levent
- Mutlu
- Özgür
- Özler
- Paşaköy
- Pekmezli
- PTT Evleri
- Sağdıçlı
- Şahinağa
- Sakızlı
- Sarıçam
- Sazak
- Şehit Erkut Akbay
- Selahattin Eyyubi
- Serinevler
- Seyhan
- Şeyhmurat
- Sinanpaşa
- Solaklı Cumhuriyet
- Solaklı Hürriyet
- Tahsilli
- Taşcı
- Ulubatlı Hasan
- Vayvaylı
- Yahşiler
- Yakapınar
- Yalnızca
- Yamaçlı
- Yavuzlar
- Yenice
- Yenidoğan
- Yeniköy
- Yerdelen
- Yeşilbağlar
- Yukarıçiçekli
- Yunusemre
- Yunusoğlu Cumhuriyet
- Yunusoğlu Hürriyet
- Zağarlı

==== Neighbourhoods in the urban area ====
The urban neighbourhoods of Yüreğir are spread into 6 distinctive zones. The major separators of these zones are the D400 state road, Yüreğir Canal, Kozan Street, Mustafakemalpaşa Boulevard.

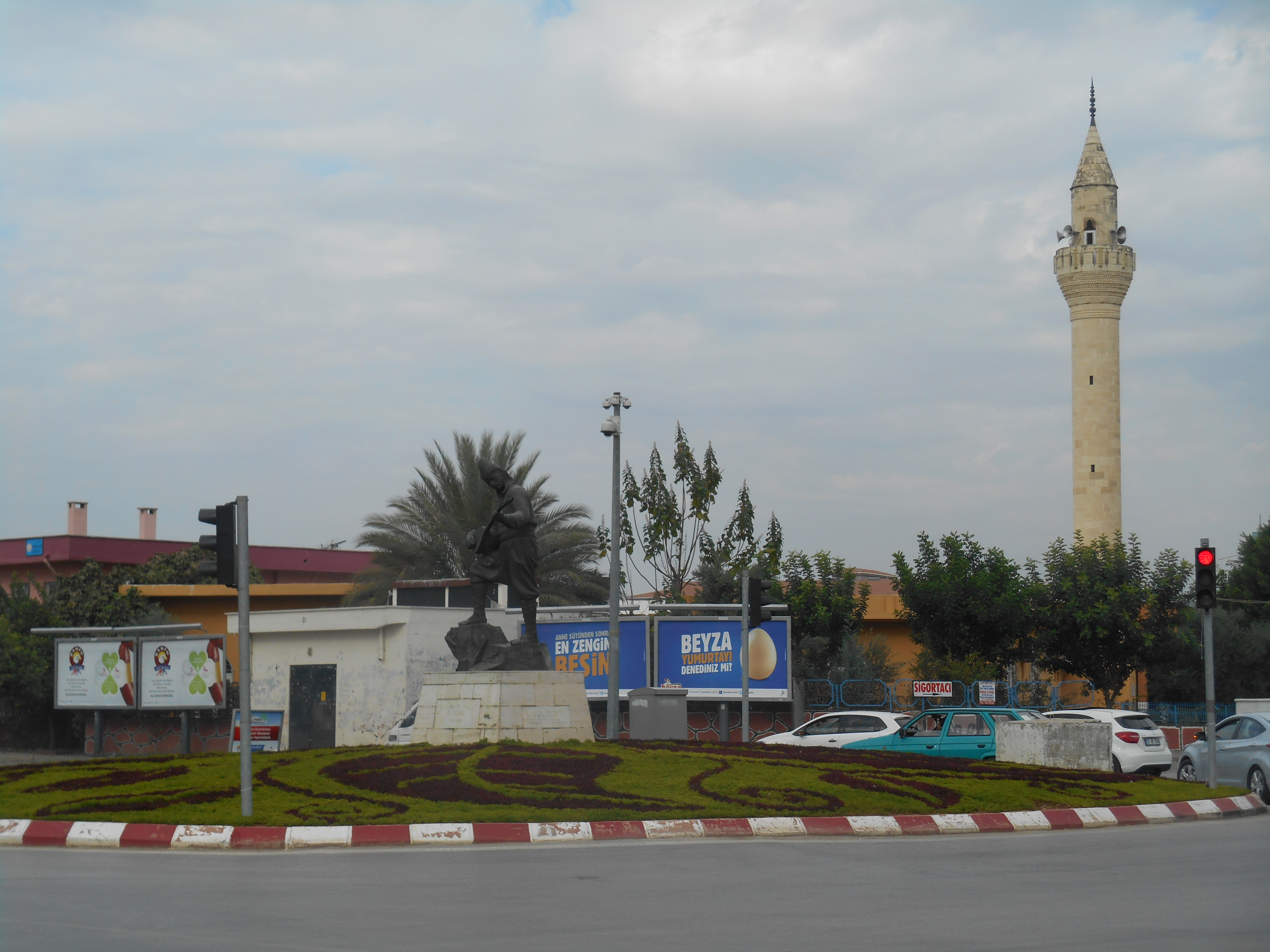
Karacaoğlan statue at the major intersection

Karşıyaka: Settled in the late 19th century, Karşıyaka is the first expansion of Adana to the east bank of Seyhan River. It is bordered by D400 state road on the north, Seyhan river on the west and Yüreğir Canal on the east. Traditionally an Arabic area, Karşıyaka has seen mass migration of Kurds during the 1990s. Yüreğir District Hall, Adana State Hospital and Asri Cemetery are located in this zone. 14 neighbourhoods of this zone are:Cumhuriyet, Yamaçlı, Seyhan, Haydaroğlu, Bahçelievler, Akdeniz, Güneşli, Anadolu, Dede Korkut, Yunus Emre, 19 Mayıs, Yeşilbağlar, Koza and Başak.

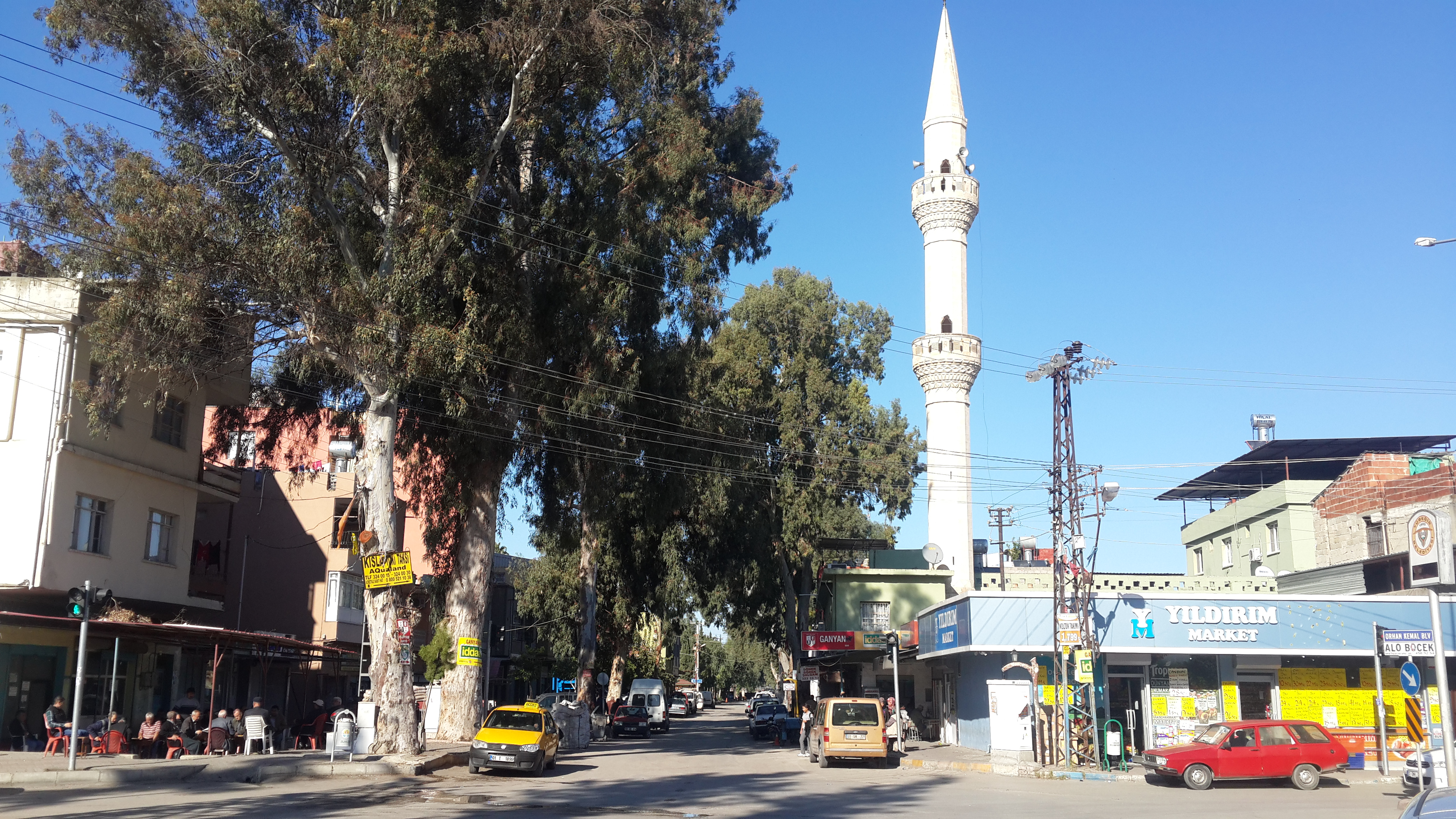
Yavuzlar neighbourhood

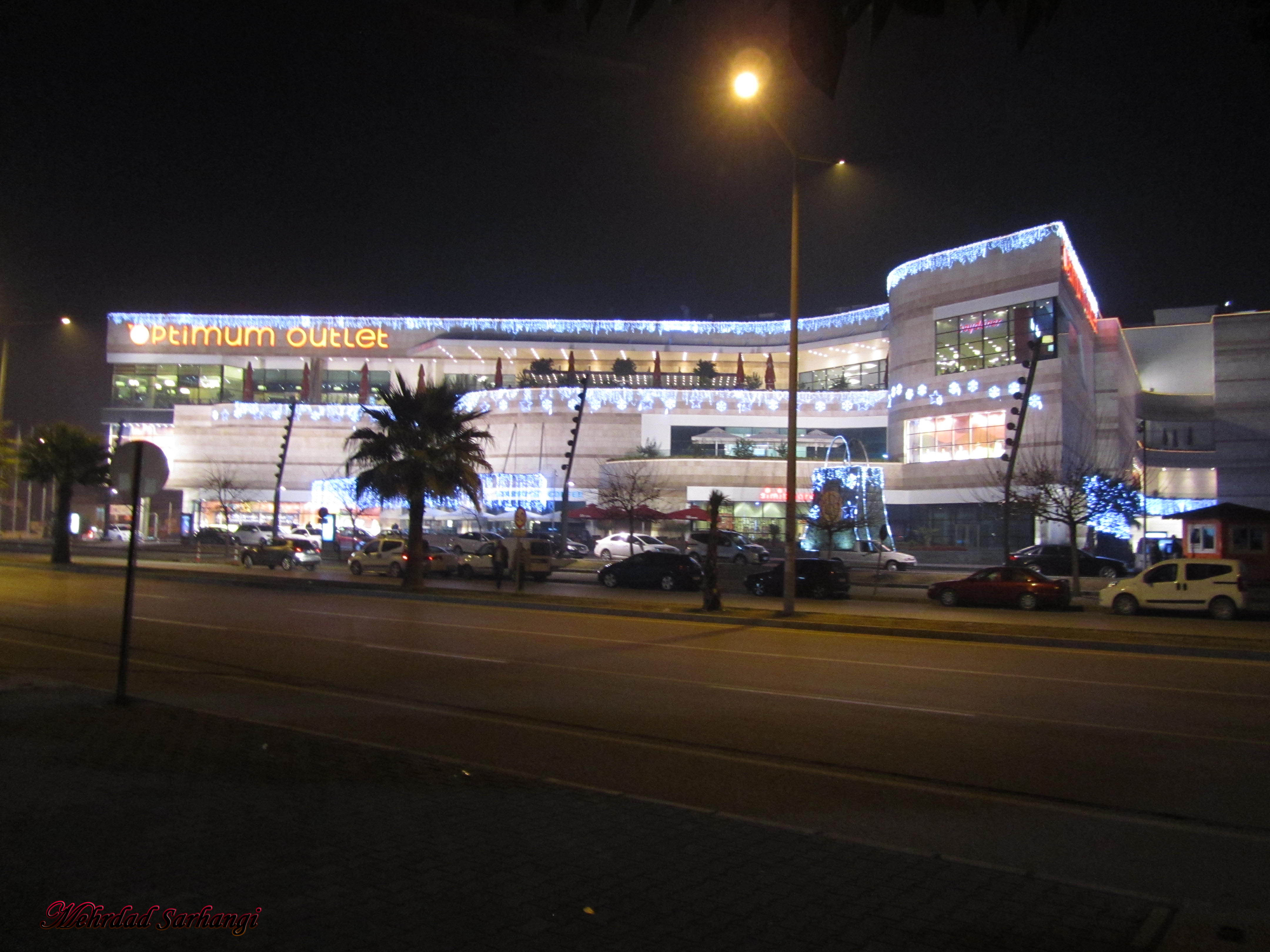
Optimum shopping mall

West of the Yüreğir Canal: Bounded with Seyhan river on the west, Mustafakemalpaşa Boulevard on the north, Yüreğir Canal on the east and D400 state road on the south, this zone is getting increasingly important, with the bridges that were built on the river and the extension of Adana Metro. An urban redevelopment under effect to convert Sinanpaşa and Yavuzlar neighbourhoods into modern commercial and residential areas. Yüreğir Municipal Hall and Yüreğir Bus Terminal are located in this zone. The 5 neighbourhoods of this are: Sinanpaşa, Sarıçam, Özgür, Yavuzlar and Akıncılar. Total population of the zone is 48270.

North of Mustafakemalpaşa Boulevard: This zone is another area of Yüreğir that is facing urban transformation. It will be converted into a modern residential area in which 2000 houses will be demolished and replaced by high rise buildings. Bordered by Mustafakemalpaşa Boulevard on the south, Seyhan river on the west, motorway on the north and Çukurova University property on the east, this zone will be home to Adana Court of Justice and 47.5 hectare Health Campus. 6th corps of the 2nd army is also based at this zone. The 3 neighbourhoods of this zone are: Kışla, Köprülü and Kazım Karabekir. Total population is 34294.

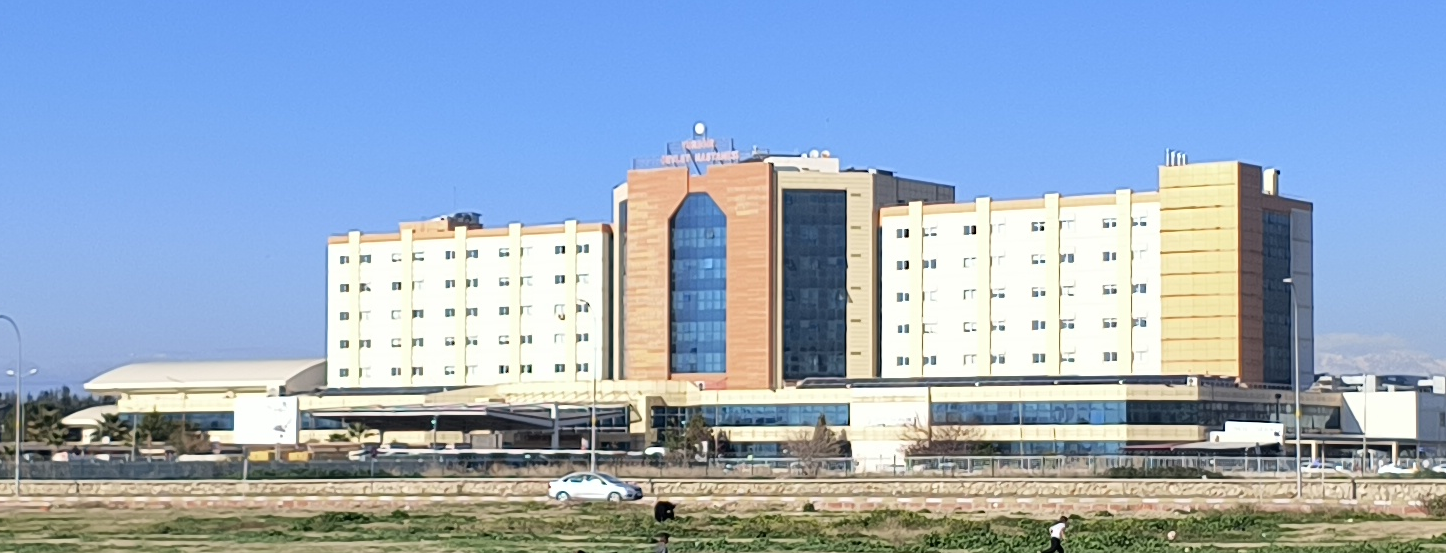
Yüreğir State Hospital

West of the Kozan Street: Bounded by Kozan street on the east, Yüreğir Canal on the south, Çukurova University property on the west and Yeşil Boulevard on the north, this zone has 6 neighbourhoods: PTT Evleri, Karacaoğlan, Selahaddin Eyyubi, Serinevler, Tahsilli and Dadaloğlu.

East of the Kozan Street: This zone is bordered by Kozan street on the west, Yüreğir Canal on the south-west, D400 state road on the south, İncirlik Air Base on the east. The 10 neighbourhoods of this zone are: Yıldırım Beyazıt, Remzi Oğuz Arık, Ulubatlı Hasan, Kiremithane, Dervişler, Şehit Erkut Akbay, Çamlıbel, Yenidoğan, Mutlu and Atakent.

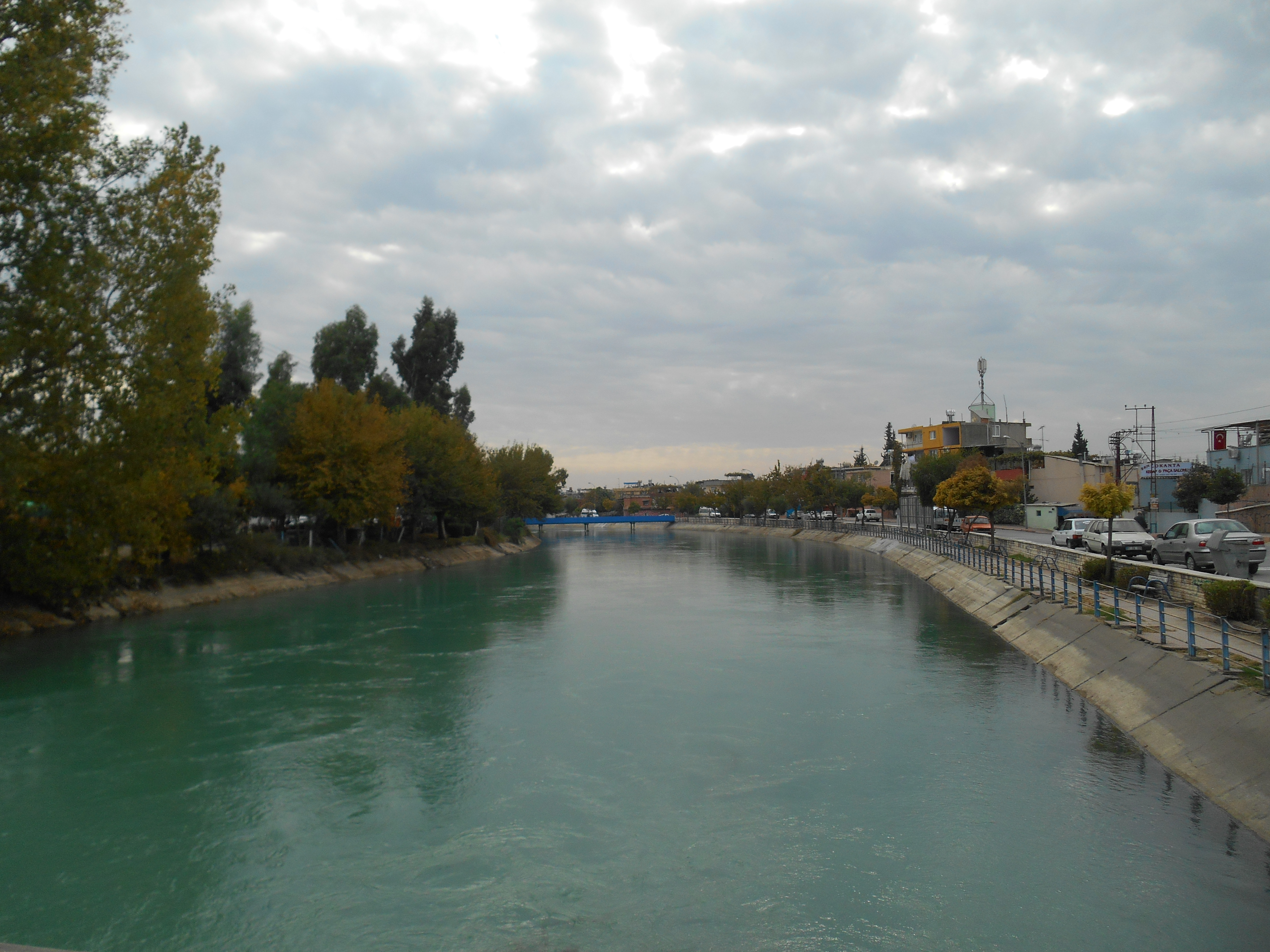
Grand Canal

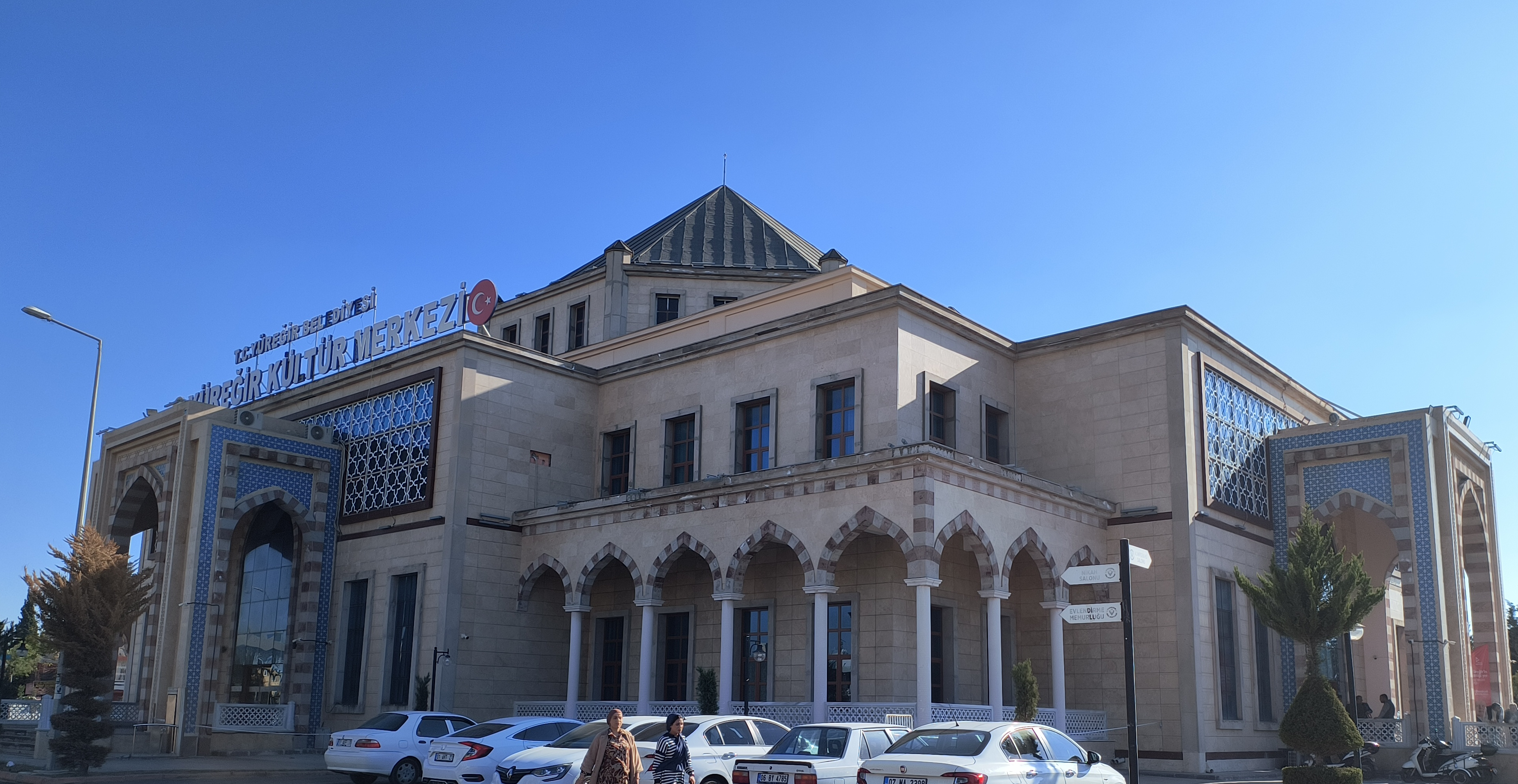
Yüreğir Cultural Center - Cross View

South of the D400: Bounded by D400 state road on the road and Yüreğir Canal on the west, this zone has 2 neighbourhoods: Levent and Güzelevler.

==== Neighbourhoods outside the urban area ====
As the city borders have expanded, the municipalities and villages in the new limits of the city have been annexed to the city. Neighbourhoods of the former municipalities and former villages have then become part of the Yüreğir district as neighbourhoods. There are a total of 61 non-urban neighbourhoods which are located on the east and south end of Yüreğir.

Abdioğlu: 9 neighbourhoods of this former municipality are, Büyükkapılı, Cumhuriyet, Çotlu, Düzce, Esenler, Herekli, Kütüklü, Özler, Yahşiler

Doğankent: 10 neighbourhoods of this former municipality are, Ağzıbüyük, Bahçelievler, Cumhuriyet, Danişment, Denizkuyusu, Gazipaşa, Kışla, Pekmezli, Sağdıçlı, Şeyhmurat

Geçitli: Cumhuriyet, Havraniye

Havutlu: – The 7 neighbourhoods of this former municipality are Ali Hocalı, Aydıncık, Havutlu, Kayarlı, Köklüce,Taşcı, Yukarı Çiçekli

İncirlik: Cumhuriyet

Kürkçüler: Camili, Dedepınar

Solaklı: 16 neighbourhoods of this former municipality are Akdam, Atatürk, Beyköy, Cumhuriyet, Çağırkanlı, Eğriağaç, Gökçeli, Hürriyet, Kamışlı, Köprügözü, Paşaköy, Sazak, Şahinağa, Yalnızca, Yenice, Zağarlı

Yakapınar – Located on the west bank of Ceyhan river, its two neighbourhoods are Eski Misis and Yakapınar

Yunusoğlu – The 12 neighbourhoods of this former municipality are Cırık, Cine, Cumhuriyet, Gümüşyazı, Hacıali, Hürriyet, Irmakbaşı, Kadıköy, Karaahmetli, Sakızlı, Yeniköy, Yerdelen.

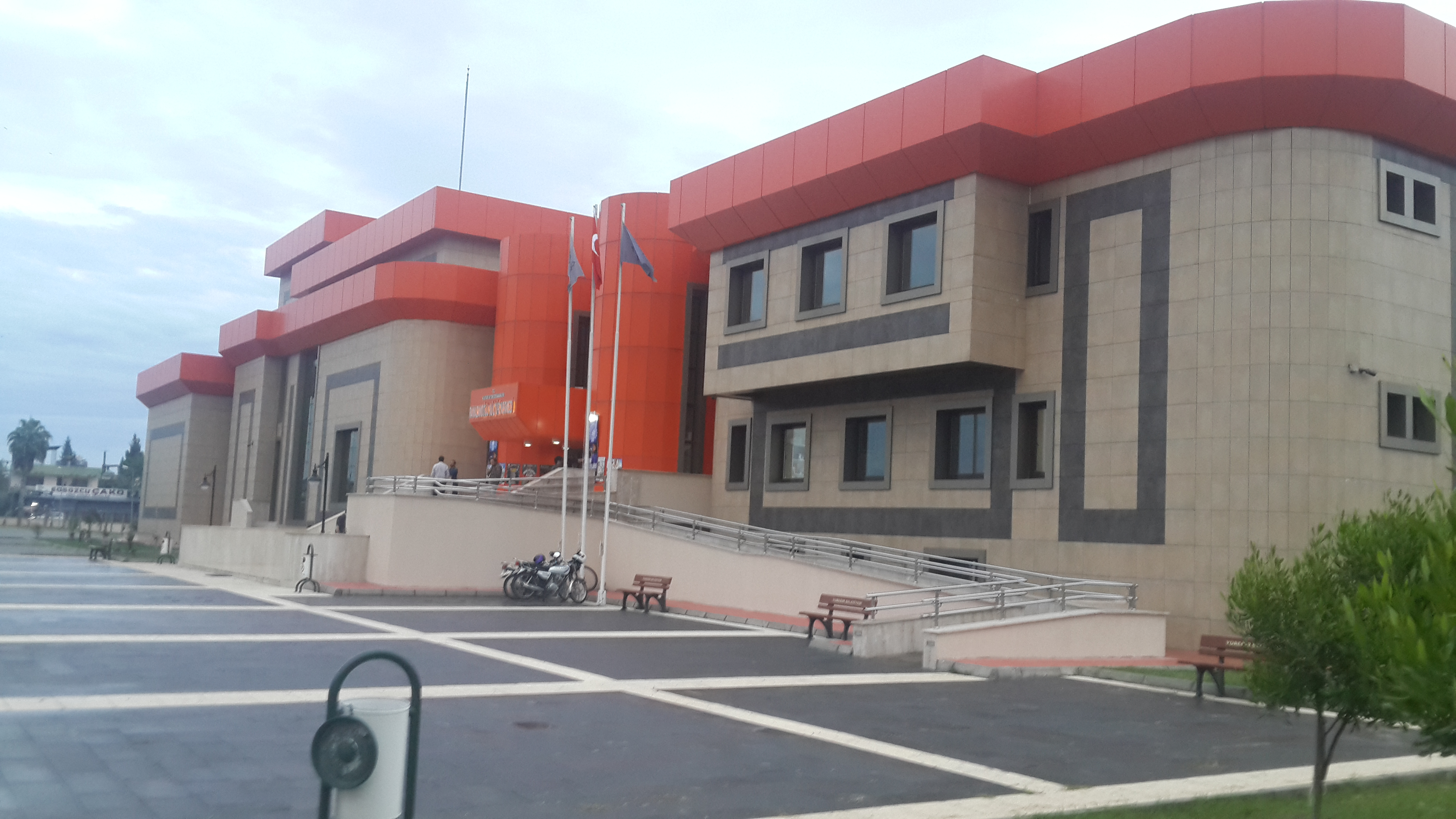
Ramazanoğlu Cultural Center

== Culture ==
Two cultural centres in Yüreğir host theatres, concerts, exhibitions and conferences. There are two public libraries in the district: Yüreğir and Ramazanoğlu Public Library.

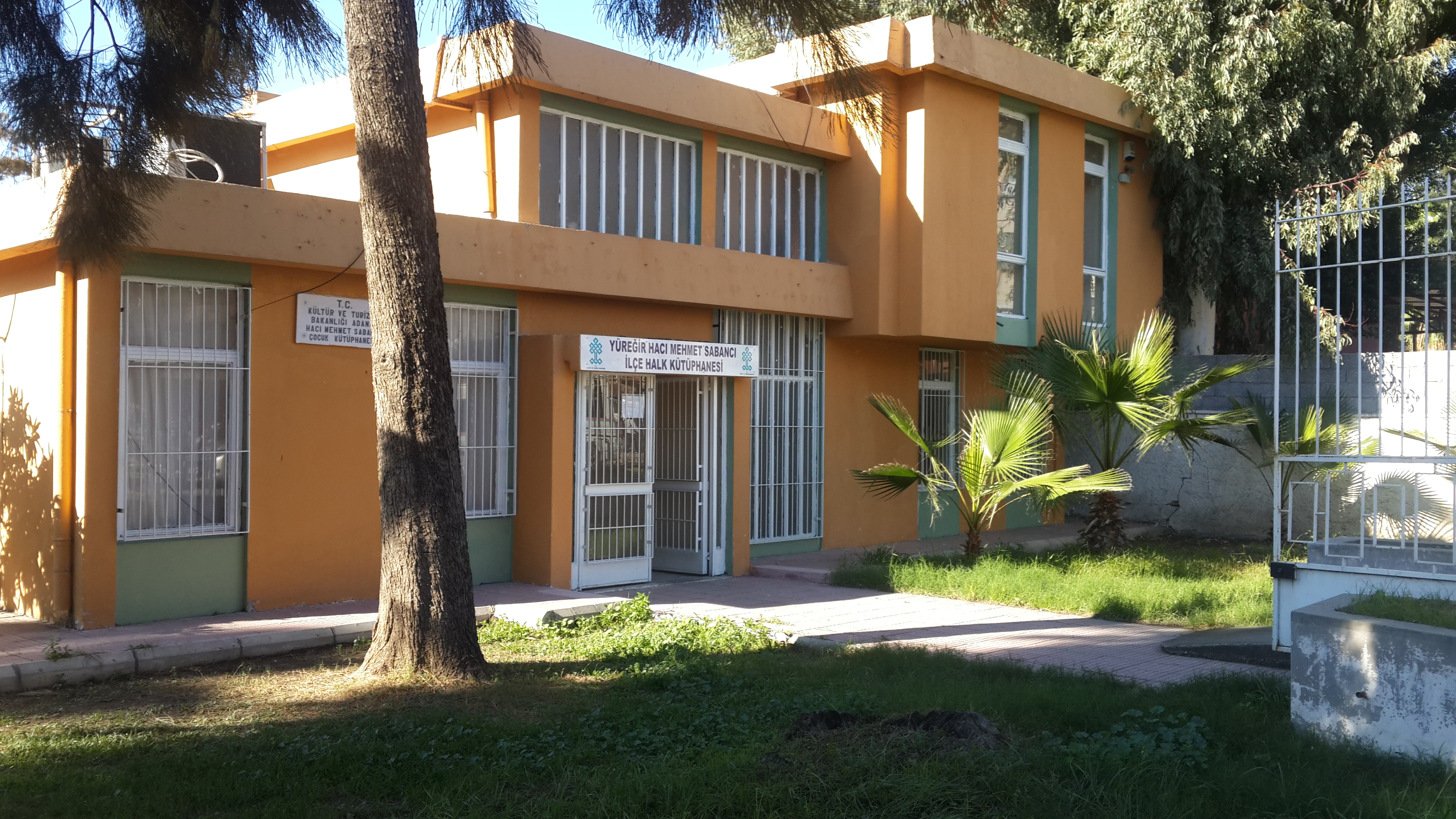
Yüreğir Public Library

Yüreğir Cultural Centre in the Kazım Karabekir neighbourhood has the largest hall in Adana, with 1000 seats. It is mostly used for conferences. The centre also has two other conference halls, both seating 200. The centre is owned and operated by the Yüreğir Municipality.

Ramazanoğlu Cultural Center, in the Karşıyaka quarter, is a cultural centre of the Ministry of Culture and Tourism. The centre has a theatre hall, library and two exhibition halls. Adana Town Theatre performs regularly at the centre.

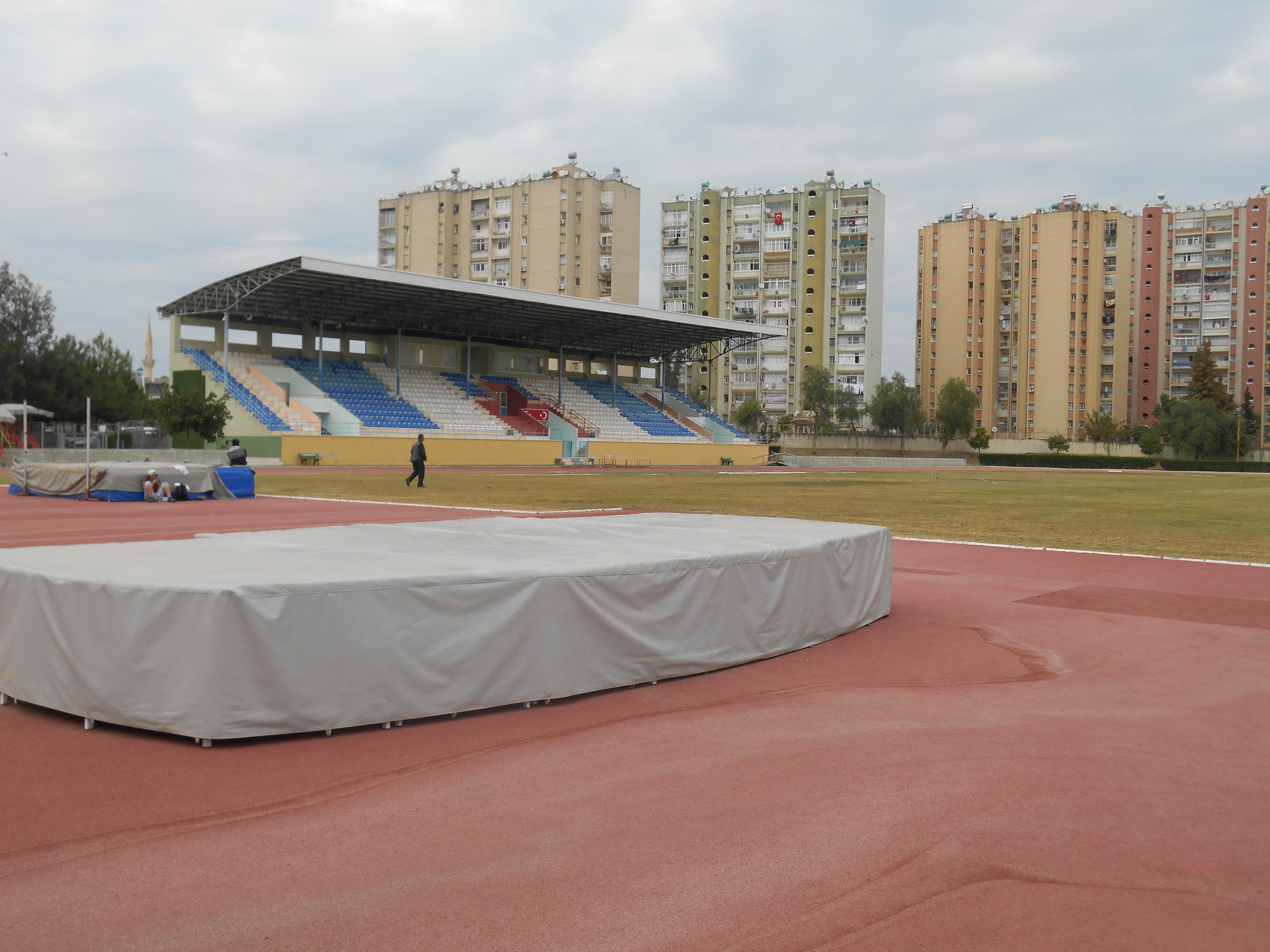
Serinevler Athletics Stadium

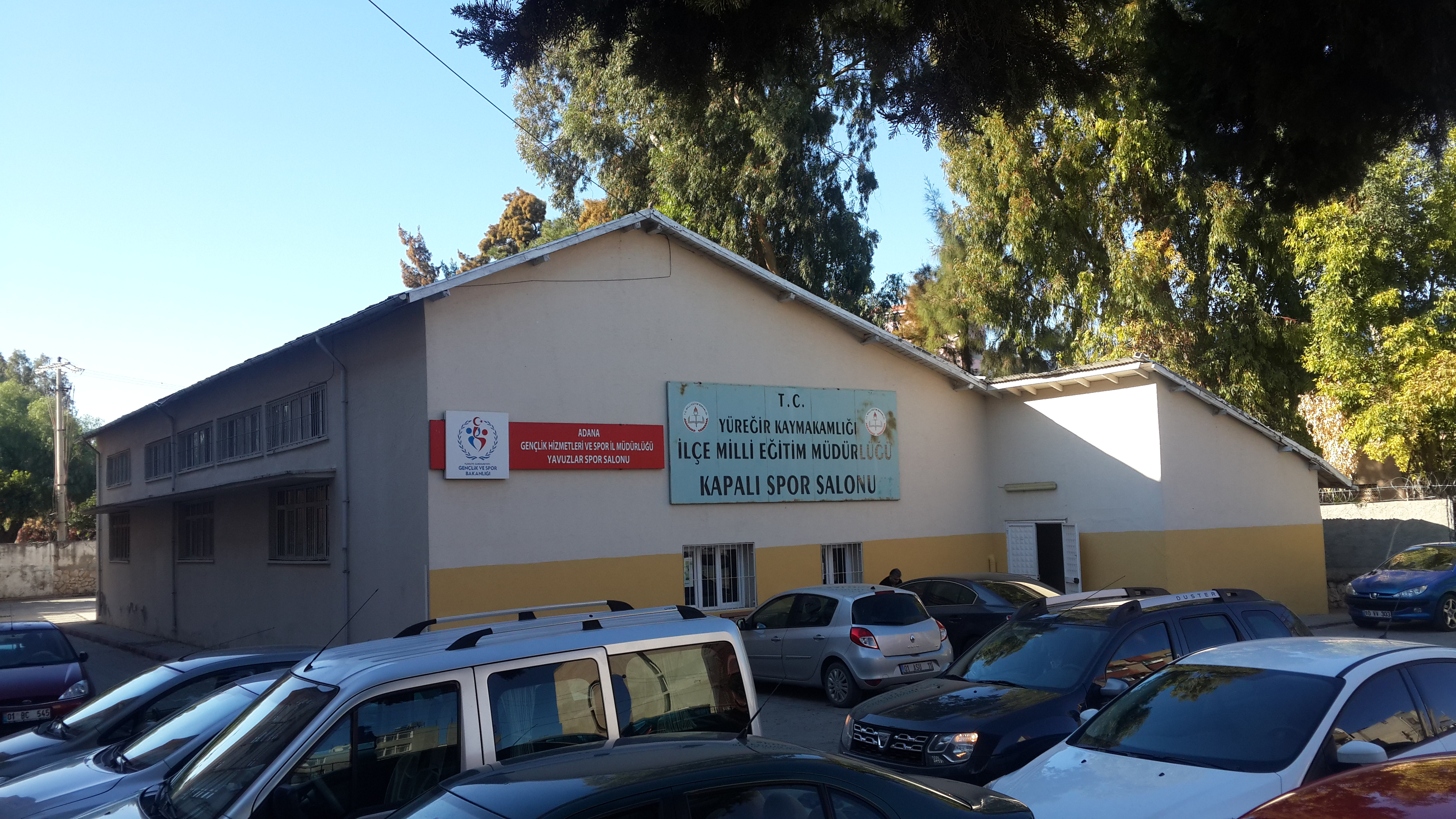
Yavuzlar Sports Hall

== Sports ==
Serinevler Arena is a multi-sport arena, located in the Serinevler neighbourhood. The arena has a spectator capacity of 2500. Serinevler Athletics Stadium, situated just east of the arena, is a venue for athletics. Peyami Safa Maracı stadium, located in the Karşıyaka quarter, is used for football games. Yavuzlar Sports Hall in the Yavuzlar neighbourhood is a venue for basketball, volleyball and handball.

Adana Equestrian Club, located in the Kışla neighbourhood, is the largest centre for horse riding in Turkey, hosting national and international show jumping competitions.

== Transport ==
Adana Metro has two stations in Yüreğir; Cumhuriyet station in the Karşıyaka quarter and Akıncılar station next to the Yüreğir Coach Terminal. There are bus transfer grounds on both of the metro stations.

Yüreğir is served by three railway stations. The railway station at the central Yüreğir is the Kiremithane railway station. The station is served by one regional and one long-distance line. The other stations are the İncirlik and the Yakapınar.

Yüreğir Coach Terminal is home to the regional bus and minibus companies that serve to the eastern towns of Çukurova. The coach terminal is in Akıncılar neighbourhood, off the D400 State Road.
