= Çotlu, Yüreğir =

Çotlu
- Neighbourhood
- Location in Turkey
- Coordinates: 36.8717°N 35.4802°E
- Country: Turkey
- Province: Adana
- District: Yüreğir
- Population (2022): 622
- Time zone: UTC+3 (TRT)

Çotlu is a neighbourhood in the municipality and district of Yüreğir, Adana Province, Turkey. Its population is 622 (2022).
