= Köklüce, Yüreğir =

Köklüce
- Neighbourhood
- Location in Turkey
- Coordinates: 36.9401°N 35.4228°E
- Country: Turkey
- Province: Adana
- District: Yüreğir
- Population (2022): 1,088
- Time zone: UTC+3 (TRT)

Köklüce is a neighbourhood in the municipality and district of Yüreğir, Adana Province, Turkey. Its population is 1,088 (2022).
