= Çatalpınar, Yüreğir =

Çatalpınar
- Neighbourhood
- Location in Turkey
- Coordinates: 36°49′34″N 35°34′21″E
- Country: Turkey
- Province: Adana
- District: Yüreğir
- Population (2022): 878
- Time zone: UTC+3 (TRT)

Çatalpınar is a neighbourhood in the municipality and district of Yüreğir, Adana Province, Turkey. Its population is 878 (2022).
