= Havutlu, Yüreğir =

Havutlu
- Neighbourhood
- Location within Turkey
- Coordinates: 36.9248°N 35.3567°E
- Country: Turkey
- Province: Adana
- District: Yüreğir
- Population (2022): 4,639
- Time zone: UTC+3 (TRT)

Havutlu is a neighbourhood in the municipality and district of Yüreğir, Adana Province, Turkey. Its population is 4,639 (2022). It was an independent municipality until it was merged into the municipality of Yüreğir in 2008.
