= Serinevler Athletics Stadium =

Sports venue in Yüreğir, Adana Province, Turkey

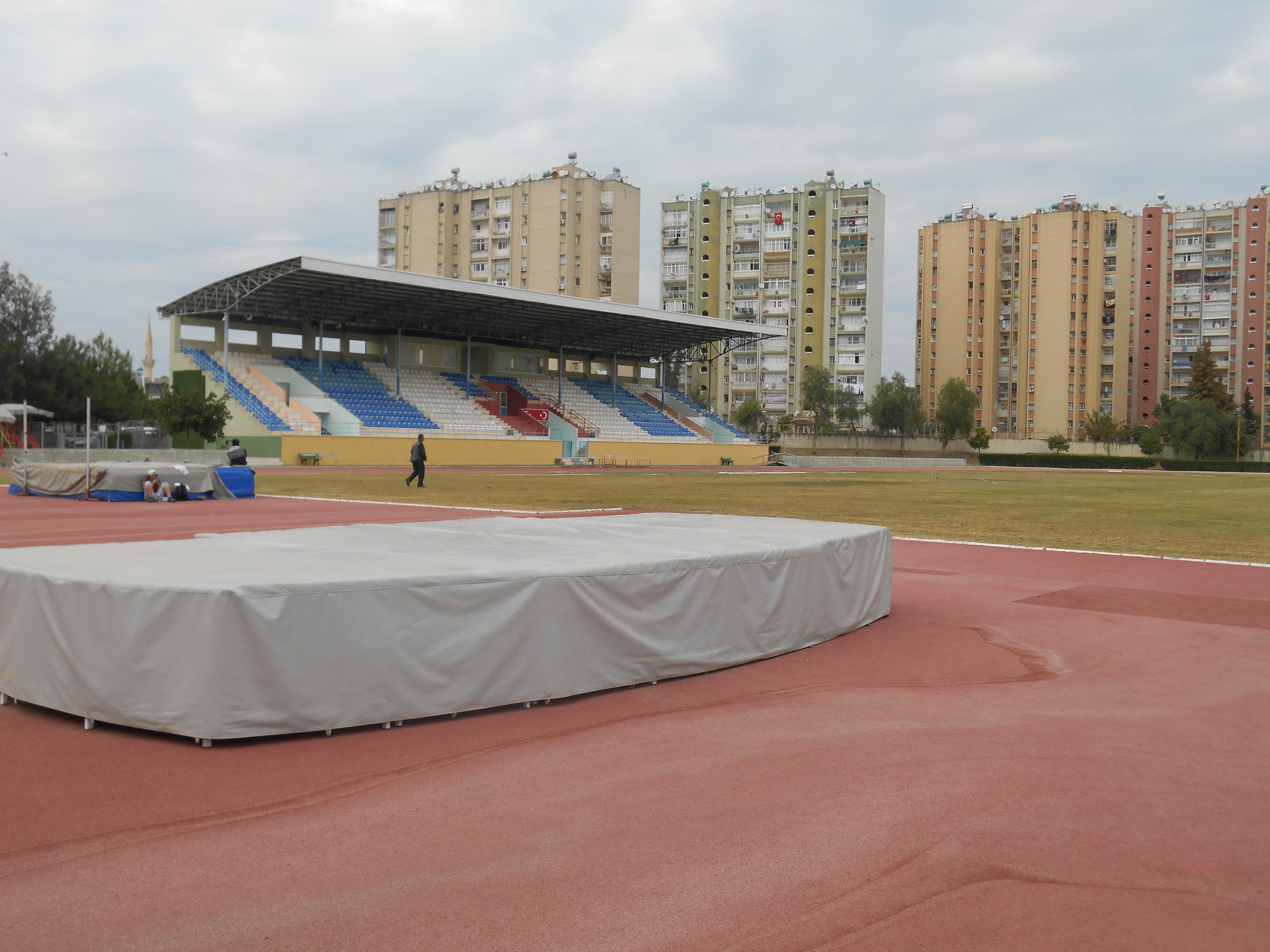
- Interactive map of Serinevler Athletics Stadium
- Full name: Serinevler Atletizm Pisti
- Location: Serinevler, Yüreğir, Adana, Turkey
- Coordinates: 37°00′13″N 35°21′36″E
- Owner: Republic of Turkey
- Operator: Adana Youth Services and Sports Directorate
- Surface: grass

Serinevler Athletics Stadium (Turkish: Serinevler Atletizm Pisti) is a sports venue for athletics competitions in track and field located in Yüreğir, Adana.

== Gallery ==
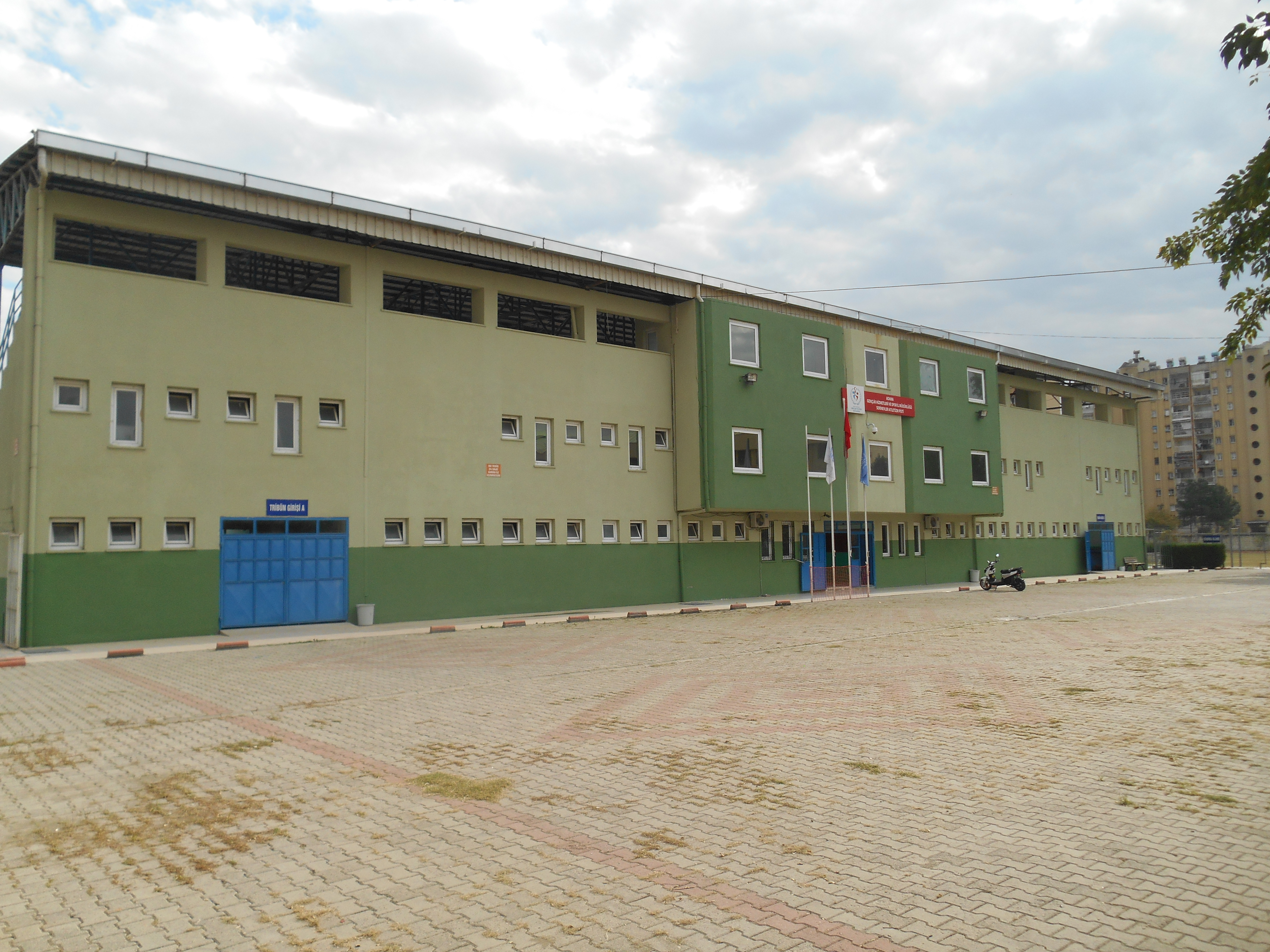

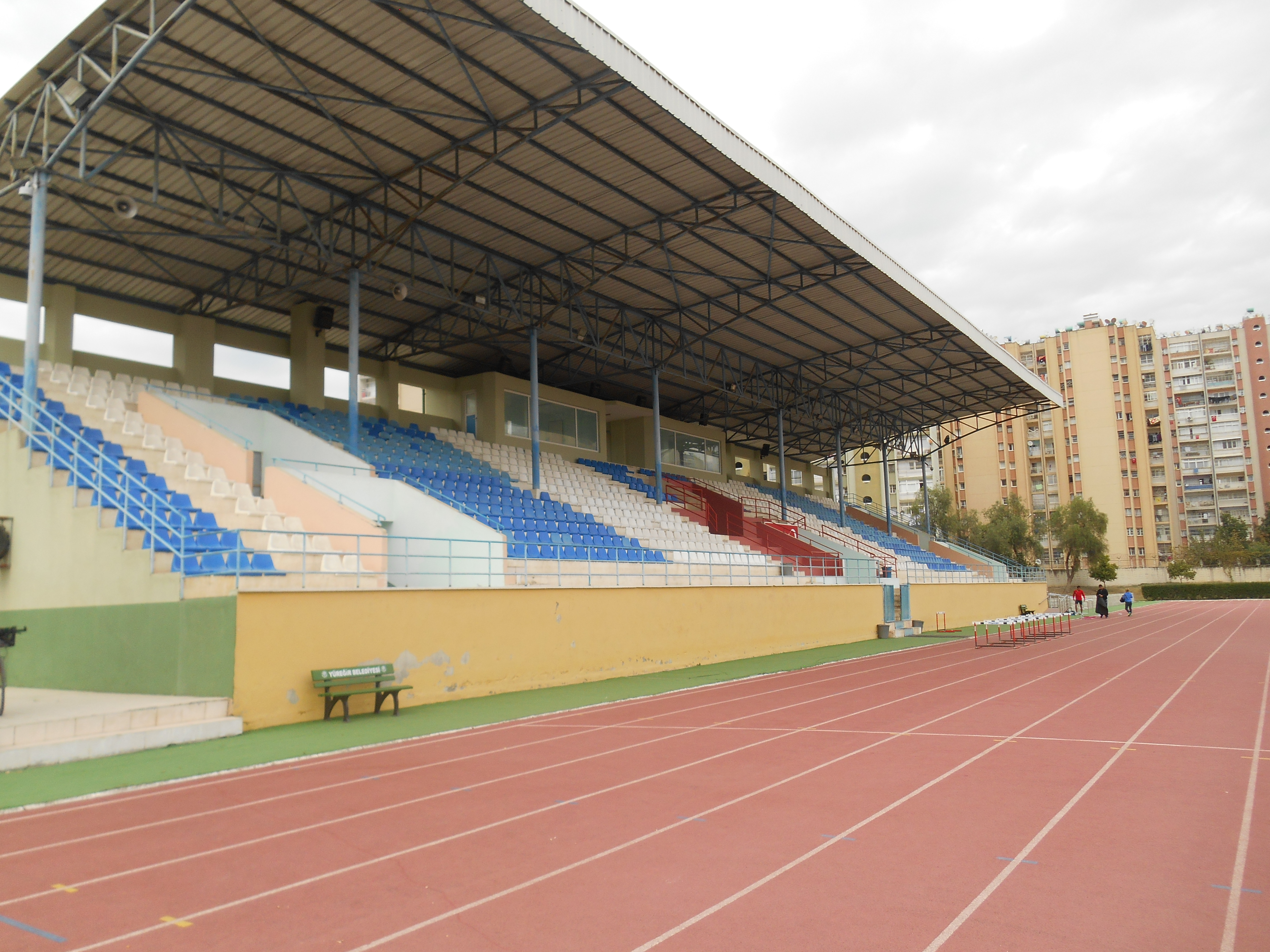
