= Yalnızca, Yüreğir =

Yalnızca
- Neighbourhood
- Location in Turkey
- Coordinates: 36.7752°N 35.4133°E
- Country: Turkey
- Province: Adana
- District: Yüreğir
- Population (2022): 222
- Time zone: UTC+3 (TRT)

Yalnızca is a neighbourhood in the municipality and district of Yüreğir, Adana Province, Turkey. Its population is 222 (2022). In 2010 it passed from the Karataş District to the Yüreğir District.
