= Yunusoğlu Cumhuriyet =

- Neighbourhood
- Location in Turkey
- Coordinates: 36.8163°N 35.2778°E
- Country: Turkey
- Province: Adana
- District: Yüreğir
- Population (2022): 1,669
- Time zone: UTC+3 (TRT)

Yunusoğlu Cumhuriyet is a neighbourhood in the municipality and district of Yüreğir, Adana Province, Turkey. Its population is 1,669 (2022). Yunusoğlu was an independent municipality until it was merged into the municipality of Yüreğir in 2008.
