= Akdam, Yüreğir =

Akdam
- Neighbourhood
- Location in Turkey
- Coordinates: 36.8006°N 35.4454°E
- Country: Turkey
- Province: Adana
- District: Yüreğir
- Population (2022): 176
- Time zone: UTC+3 (TRT)

Akdam is a neighbourhood in the municipality and district of Yüreğir, Adana Province, Turkey. Its population is 176 (2022).
