= Akpınar, Yüreğir =

Akpınar
- Neighbourhood
- Location in Turkey
- Coordinates: 36.81481°N 35.60545°E
- Country: Turkey
- Province: Adana
- District: Yüreğir
- Population (2022): 582
- Time zone: UTC+3 (TRT)

Akpınar is a neighbourhood in the municipality and district of Yüreğir, Adana Province, Turkey. Its population is 582 (2022).
