= Yakapınar, Yüreğir =

Yakapınar Misis
- Neighbourhood
- Location in Turkey
- Coordinates: 36.9586°N 35.6085°E
- Country: Turkey
- Province: Adana
- District: Yüreğir
- Population (2022): 2,801
- Time zone: UTC+3 (TRT)

Yakapınar (formerly: Misis) is a neighbourhood in the municipality and district of Yüreğir, Adana Province, Turkey. Its population is 2,801 (2022). It was an independent municipality until it was merged into the municipality of Yüreğir in 2008. It is the location of the ancient city of Mopsuestia.
