= Esenler, Yüreğir =

Esenler
- Neighbourhood
- Location in Turkey
- Coordinates: 36.8140°N 35.4953°E
- Country: Turkey
- Province: Adana
- District: Yüreğir
- Population (2022): 168
- Time zone: UTC+3 (TRT)

Esenler is a neighbourhood in the municipality and district of Yüreğir, Adana Province, Turkey. Its population is 168 (2022).
