= Çağırkanlı, Yüreğir =

Çağırkanlı
- Neighbourhood
- Location in Turkey
- Coordinates: 36.7828°N 35.3033°E
- Country: Turkey
- Province: Adana
- District: Yüreğir
- Population (2022): 997
- Time zone: UTC+3 (TRT)

Çağırkanlı is a neighbourhood in the municipality and district of Yüreğir, Adana Province, Turkey. Its population is 997 (2022).
