= Aydıncık, Yüreğir =

Aydıncık
- Neighbourhood
- Location in Turkey
- Coordinates: 36.8638°N 35.2990°E
- Country: Turkey
- Province: Adana
- District: Yüreğir
- Population (2022): 95
- Time zone: UTC+3 (TRT)

Aydıncık is a neighbourhood in the municipality and district of Yüreğir, Adana Province, Turkey. Its population is 95 (2022).
