= Camili, Yüreğir =

Camili
- Neighbourhood
- Location in Turkey
- Coordinates: 36.9296°N 35.4317°E
- Country: Turkey
- Province: Adana
- District: Yüreğir
- Population (2022): 1,682
- Time zone: UTC+3 (TRT)

Camili is a neighbourhood in the municipality and district of Yüreğir, Adana Province, Turkey. Its population is 1,682 (2022).
