= Büyükkapılı, Yüreğir =

Büyükkapılı
- Neighbourhood
- Location in Turkey
- Coordinates: 36°52′N 35°34′E
- Country: Turkey
- Province: Adana
- District: Yüreğir
- Population (2022): 287
- Time zone: UTC+3 (TRT)

Büyükkapılı is a neighbourhood in the municipality and district of Yüreğir, Adana Province, Turkey. Its population is 287 (2022).
