= Kayarlı, Yüreğir =

Kayarlı
- Neighbourhood
- Location in Turkey
- Coordinates: 36°53′N 35°23′E
- Country: Turkey
- Province: Adana
- District: Yüreğir
- Population (2022): 294
- Time zone: UTC+3 (TRT)

Kayarlı is a neighbourhood in the municipality and district of Yüreğir, Adana Province, Turkey. Its population is 294 (2022).
