= Vayvaylı, Yüreğir =

Vayvaylı
- Neighbourhood
- Location in Turkey
- Coordinates: 36°54′07″N 35°37′58″E
- Country: Turkey
- Province: Adana
- District: Yüreğir
- Population (2022): 256
- Time zone: UTC+3 (TRT)

Vayvaylı is a neighbourhood in the municipality and district of Yüreğir, Adana Province, Turkey. Its population is 256 (2022).
