= Doğankent Cumhuriyet =

- Neighbourhood
- Location in Turkey
- Coordinates: 36.8443°N 35.3440°E
- Country: Turkey
- Province: Adana
- District: Yüreğir
- Population (2022): 5,130
- Time zone: UTC+3 (TRT)

Doğankent Cumhuriyet is a neighbourhood in the municipality and district of Yüreğir, Adana Province, Turkey. Its population is 5,130 (2022). Doğankent was an independent municipality until it was merged into the municipality of Yüreğir in 2008.
