= Adana Equestrian Club =

Largest center for horse riding in Turkey

Coordinates: 37°01′35″N 35°20′23″E

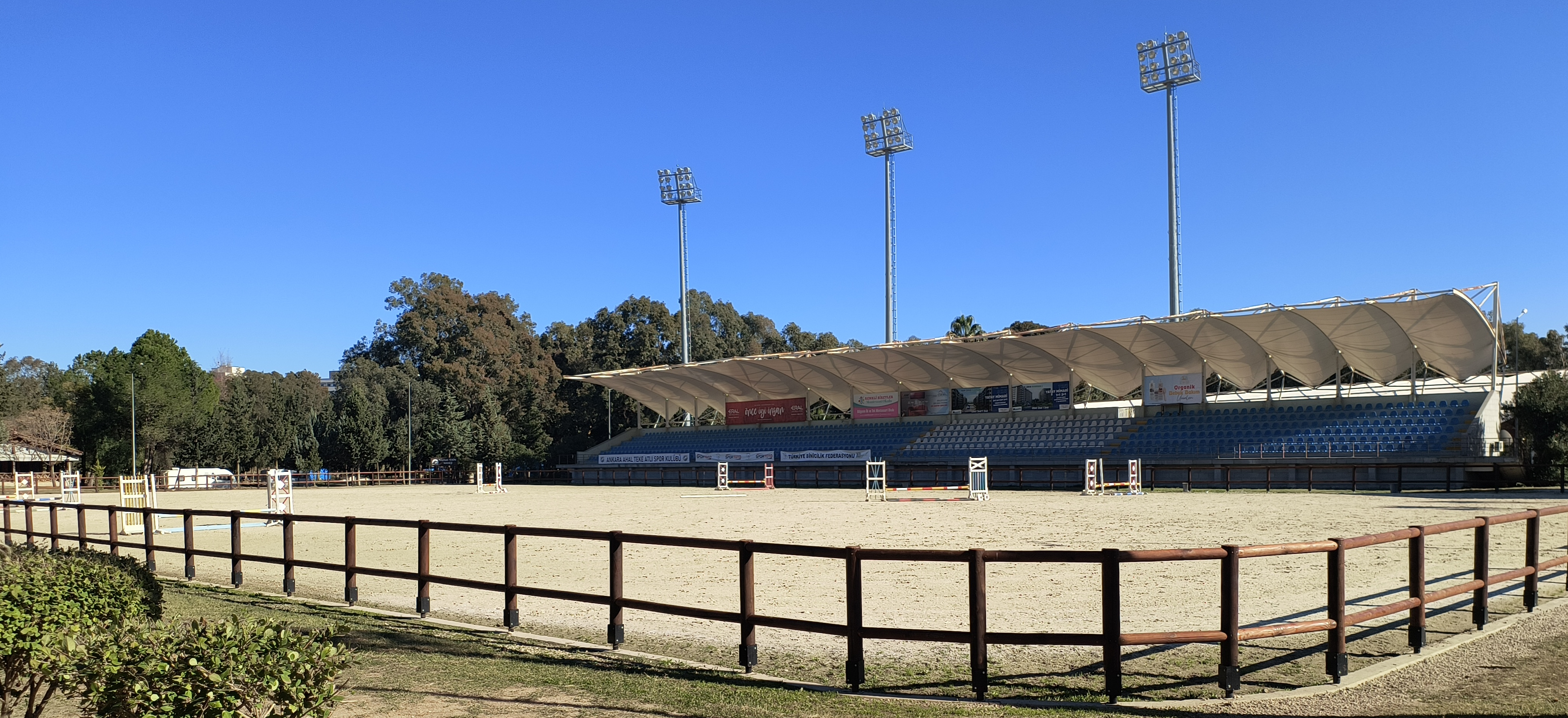
- Location: Adana
- Date opened: 1985
- Race type: Steeplechase
- Notable races: Anatolia Provinces Regional Championship

Adana Equestrian Club (Turkish: Adana Atlı Spor Kulübü), based in Adana, is the largest center for horse riding in the region, hosting regional and international show jumping competitions. It is located on Mithat Özsan Boulevard, just north of the motorway in the Kışla neighborhood of the Yüreğir district.

== History ==
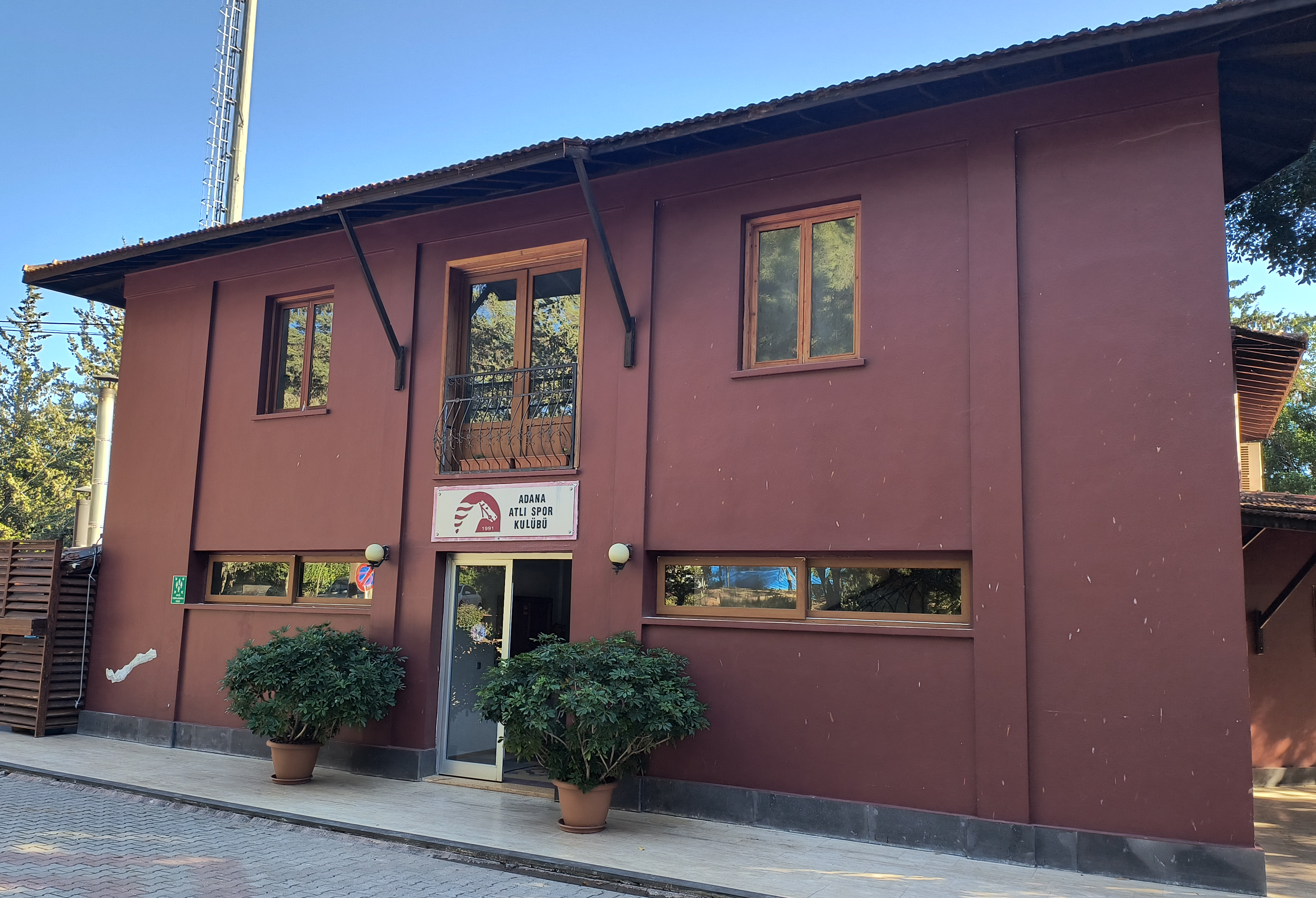
Club House

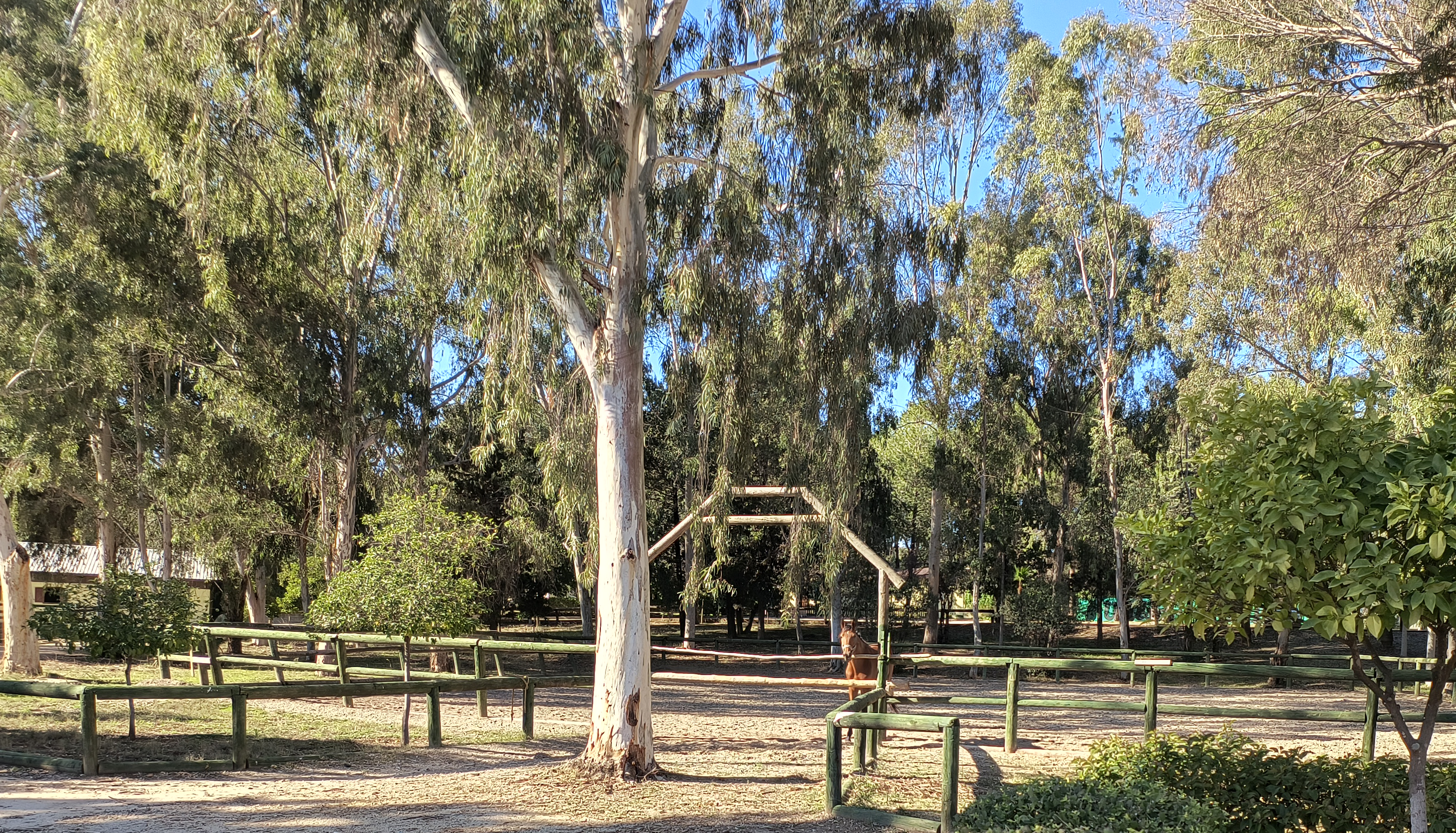
30x30m Warming Field

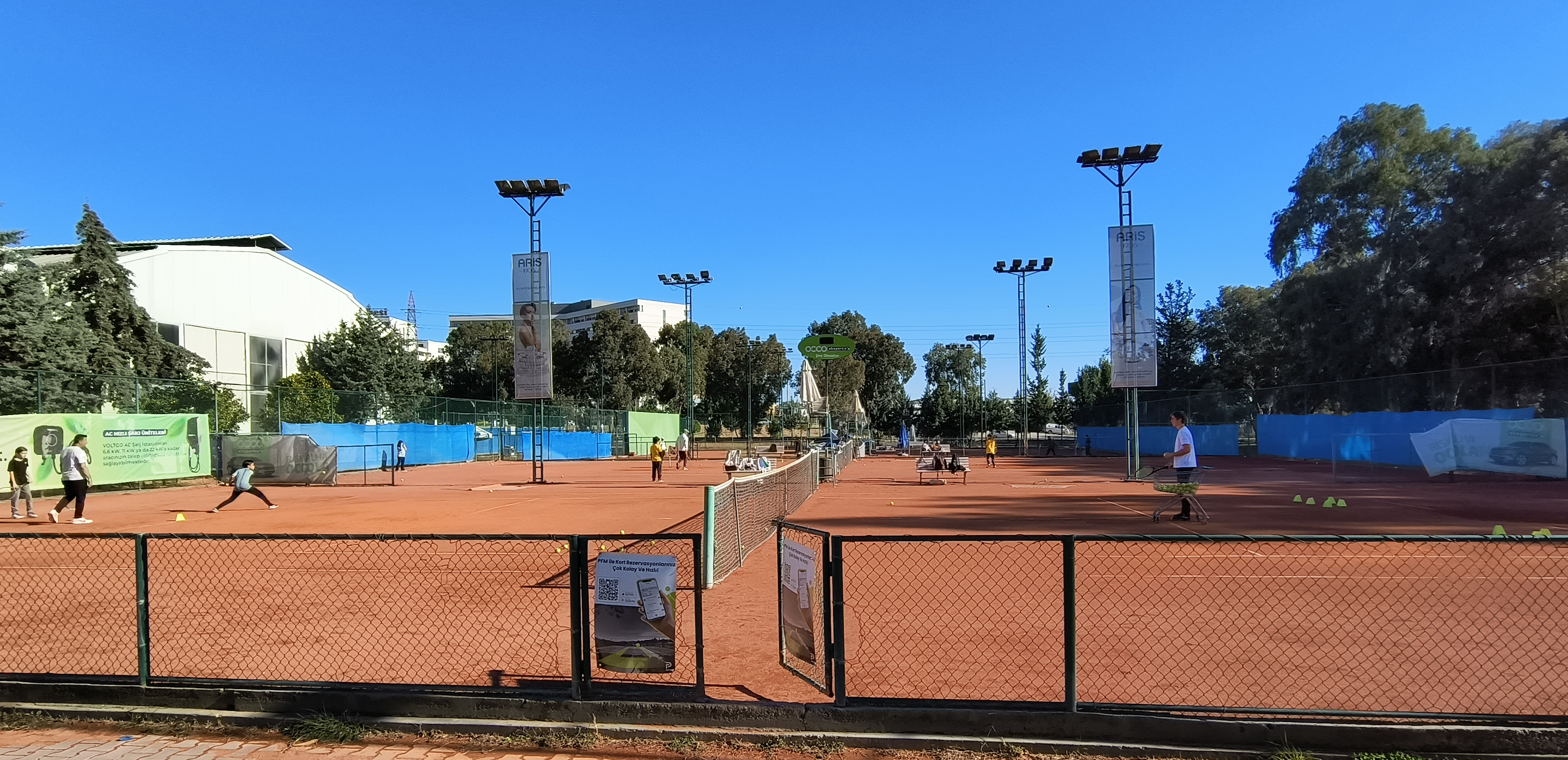
Outdoor Tennis Courts

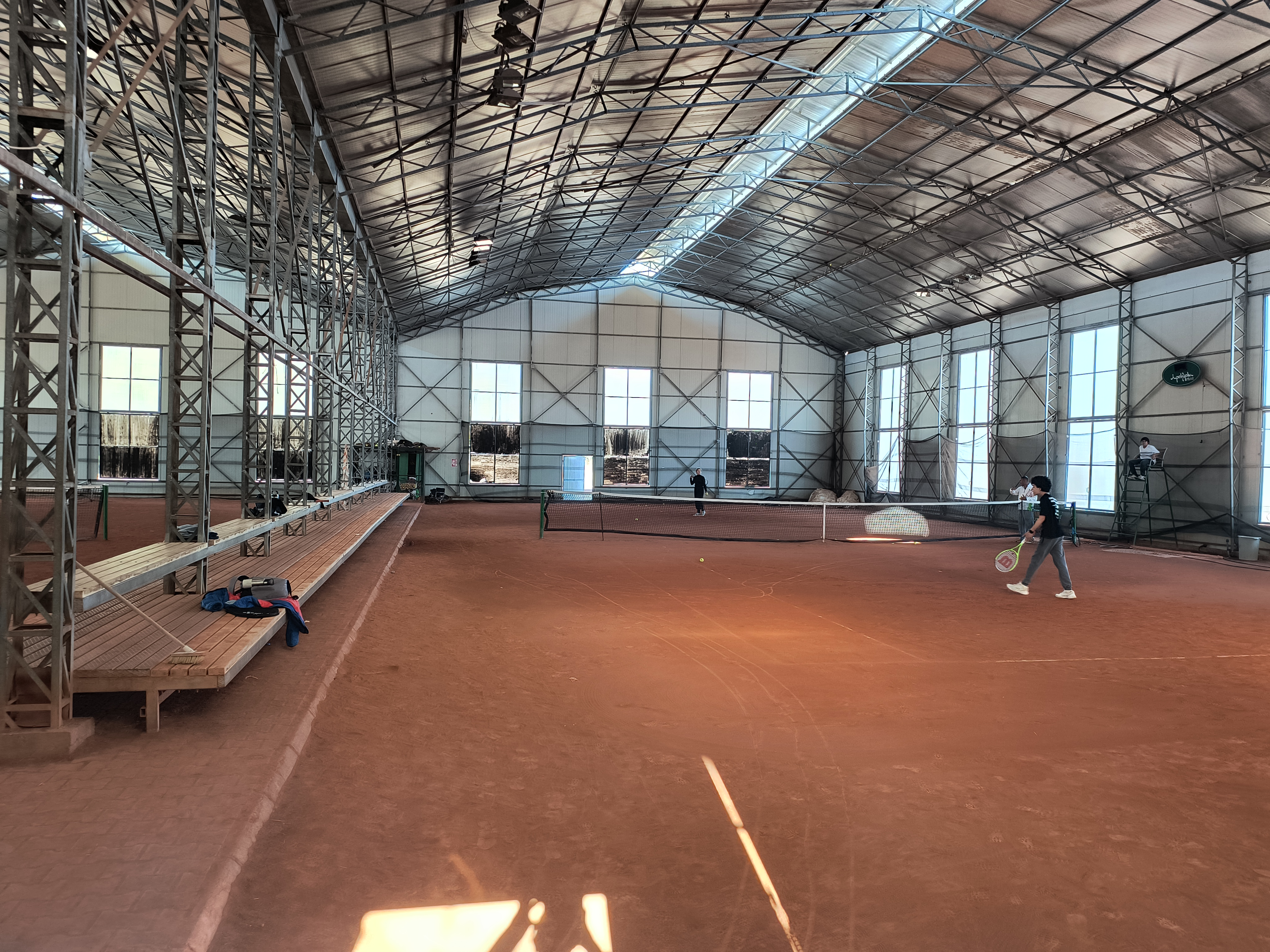
Indoor Tennis Courts

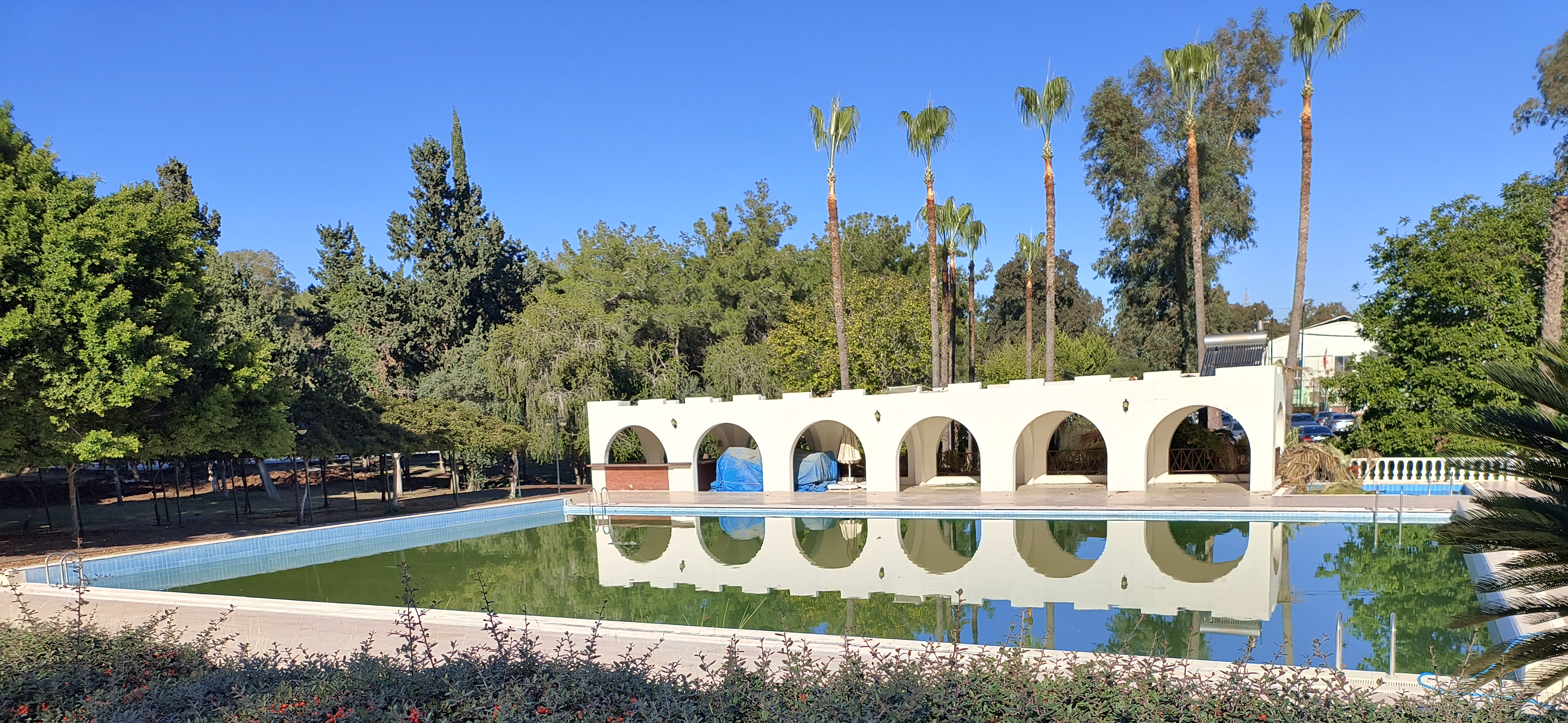
Swimming Pool

The foundation of the Adana Equestrian Club was initiated in 1985 by Süphan Tekin, Nusret Balkaroğlu and Behçet Homurlu. After six years of effort, the club was founded on November 5, 1991. The construction of the facilities then started.

Presidents since foundation;

- Suphan TEKİN : Founding President 1991-1997
- Behçet HOMURLU : President 1997-1998
- Mehmet BULDURGAN : President 1998-1999
- Behiç PAKYÜREK : President 1999-2001
- Adil BAŞOĞLU : President 2001-2002
- Esat TUĞBERK : President 2002-2008
- Suha MUTLU : President 2008-

== Facilities ==
- 40x80m outdoor manège
- 20x60m indoor manège
- 30x30m warming up field
- Two 44-box barn
- 3 paddocks
- Pony school (capacity of 30 children)

The competitions at the outdoor manege can be viewed from the Club Center and open stands. There is a restaurant at the Club Center. Besides horse riding facilities, the club accommodates other activities at;

- 7 outdoor tennis courts
- 2 indoor tennis courts
- 1 volleyball court
- An outdoor swimming pool
- Children playgrounds

== Major events ==
- 2011 Turkish Presidency Show Jumping Competitions: the most prestigious competition of the Turkish Equestrian Association was held in Adana on October 14-16th, 2011. More than 100 riders mainly from Istanbul, Ankara, İzmir, Bursa and Adana equestrian clubs attended the competition.
- 2011 Anatolia Provinces Regional Championship: the annual championship was held in Adana with participation from 10 Anatolian equestrian clubs with 85 horses. The event took place from April 29 to May 1, 2011.

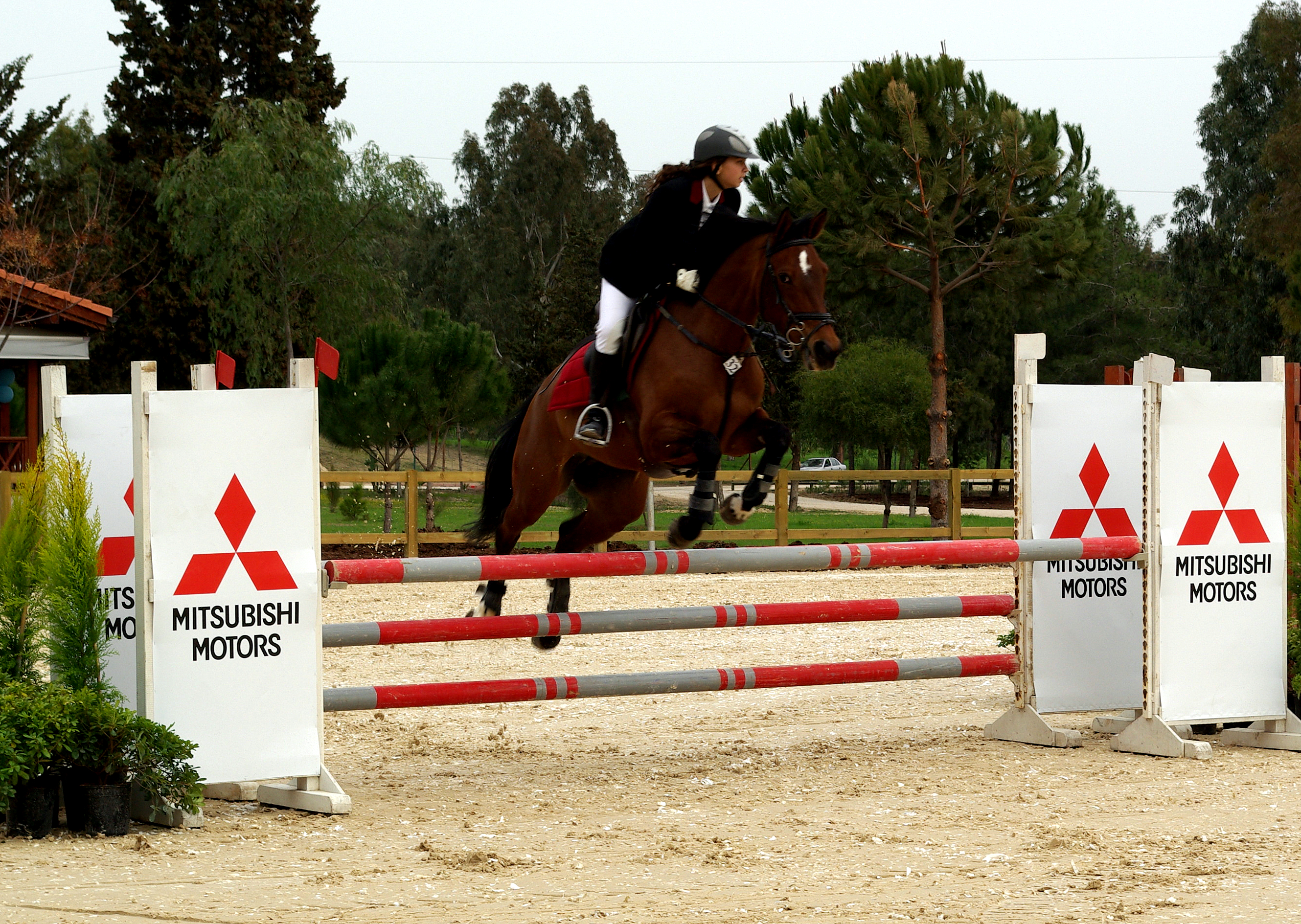
Buse Sime during competition

- Süphan Tekin Cup: the show jumping competition held during the Anatolia Provinces Regional Championship The cup was named in memory of the founder of the Adana Equestrian Club.
- 2009 Turkish Prime Ministry Show Jumping Competitions: one of the major competitions of the Turkish Equestrian Association was held in Adana on November 7–8, 2009. 100 riders from 14 clubs across Turkey attended the competitions with 120 horses.
- 2009 Intercity Show Jumping Competitions: the competition was held on March 7–8, 2009 in Adana with participations of 60 riders and horses from eight equestrian clubs across Turkey.
