= Yüreğir Cultural Centre =

Coordinates: 37°00′26″N 35°20′42″E

- Yüreğir Kültür Merkezi
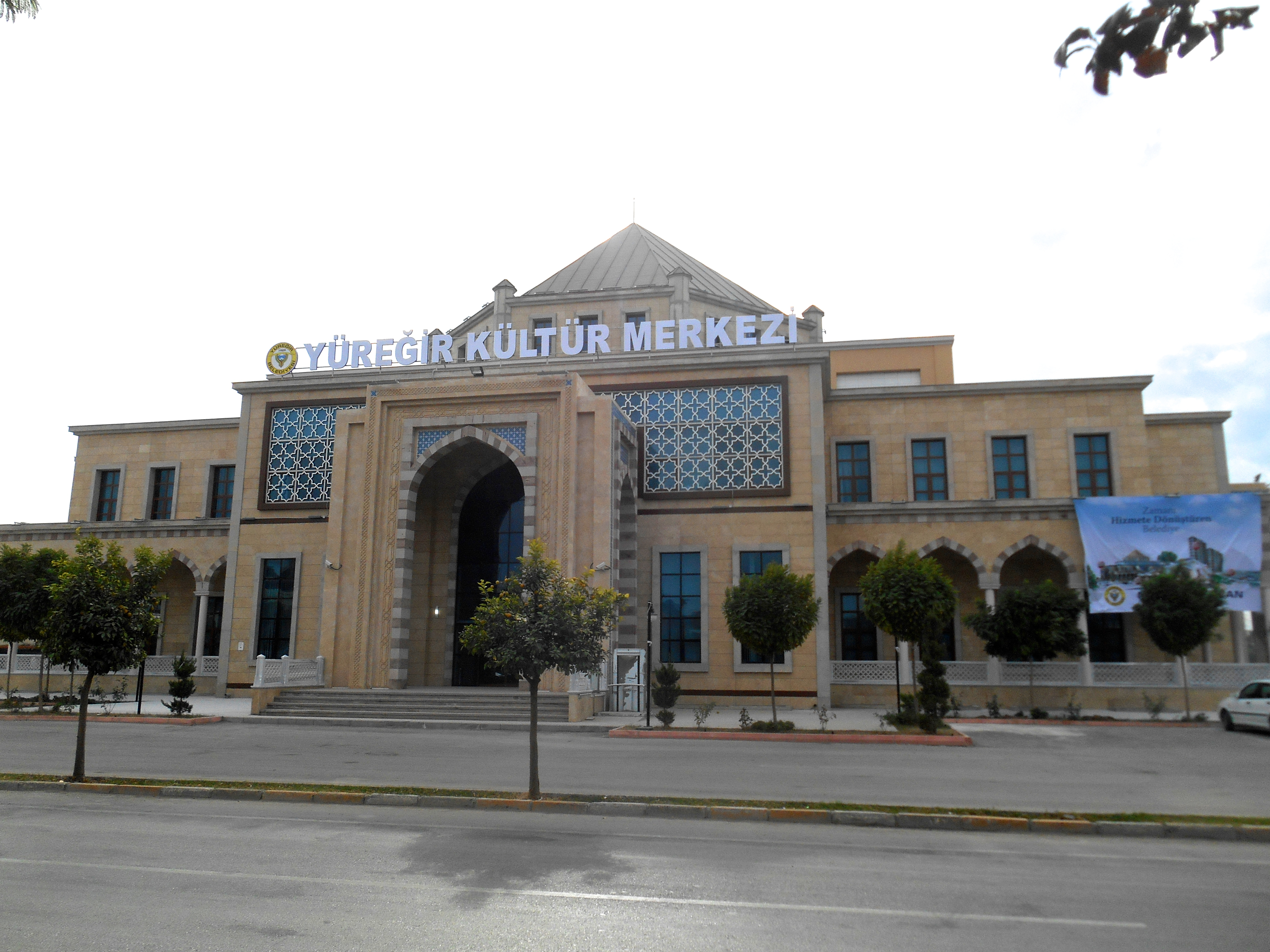
- Interactive map of Yüreğir Cultural Centre
- Address: Mustafakemalpaşa Blv., Yüreğir; Adana; Turkey
- Owner: Yüreğir Municipality
- Capacity: 1000 (large hall)
- Type: Cultural complex
- Current use: Conference

Construction
- Opened: 2014

Yüreğir Cultural Centre (Turkish: Yüreğir Kültür Merkezi) is a complex in the Yüreğir district of Adana, that is composed of three conference halls. The centre is built in a modern mix of Seljuk and Ottoman styles, next to a park in the Kazım Karabekir neighbourhood.

Yüreğir Cultural Centre has the largest hall in Adana, with 1000-seater capacity, and it is used mostly for conferences. The other two halls, 200-seater both, are for conferences and weddings.

== Gallery ==
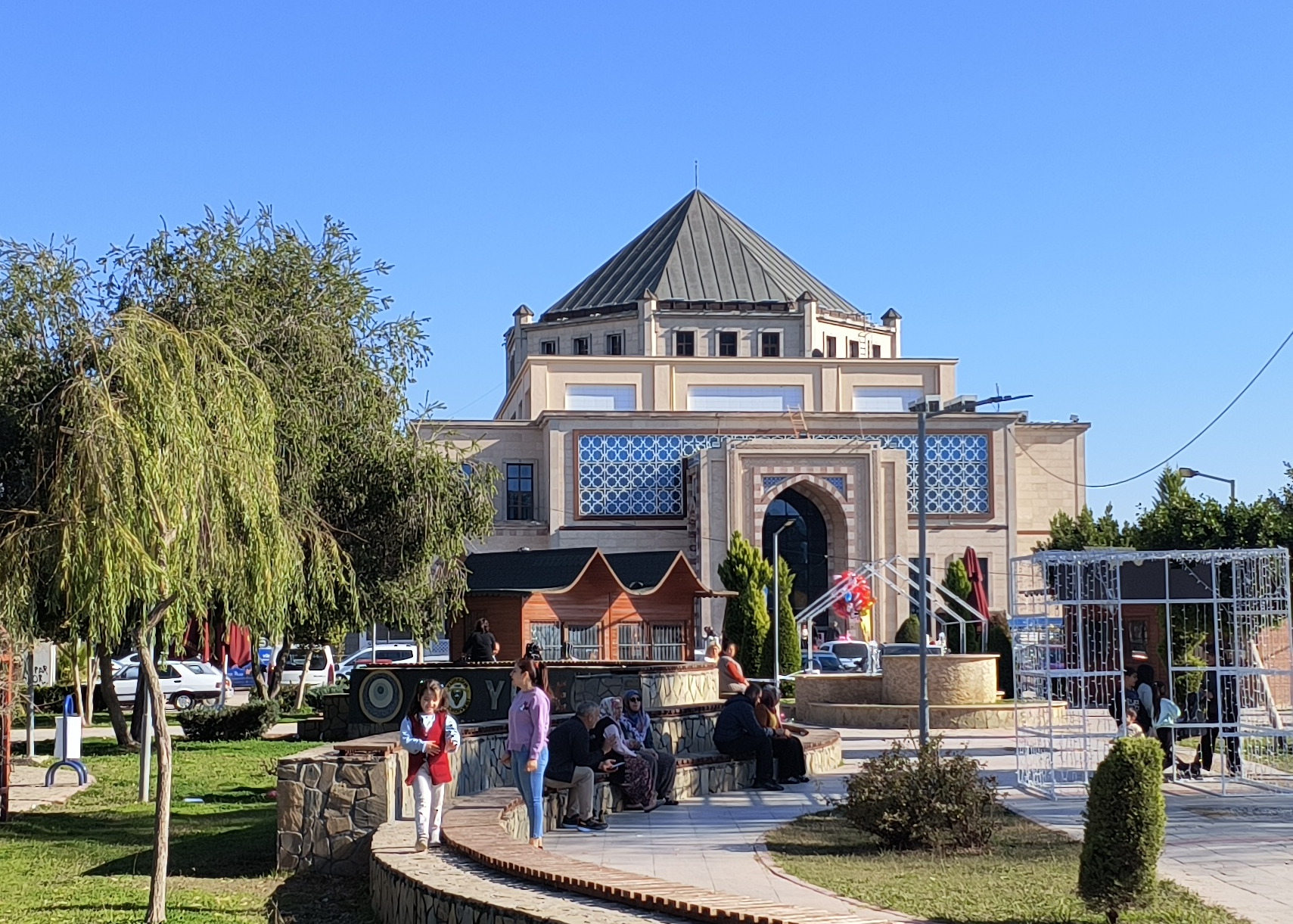

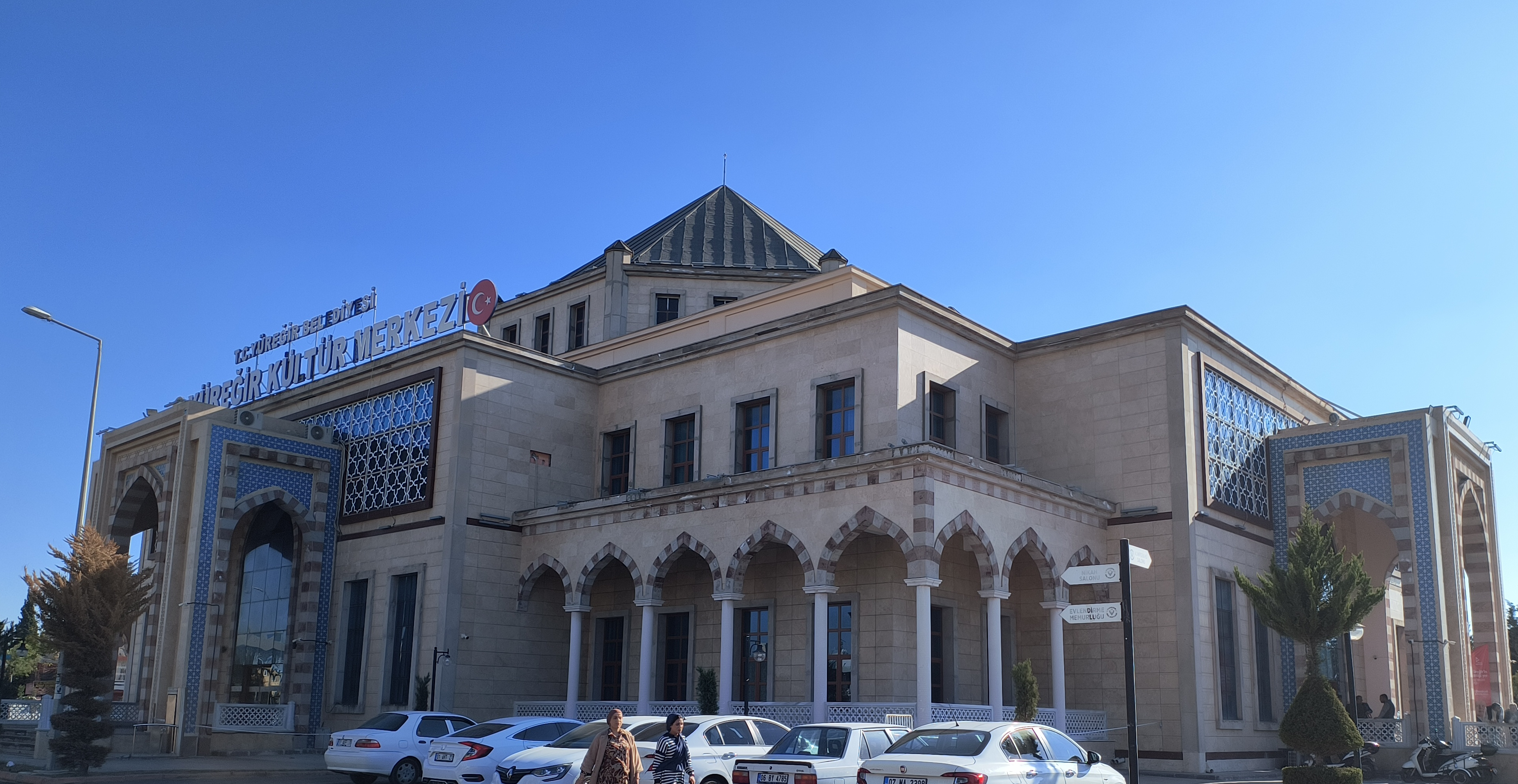

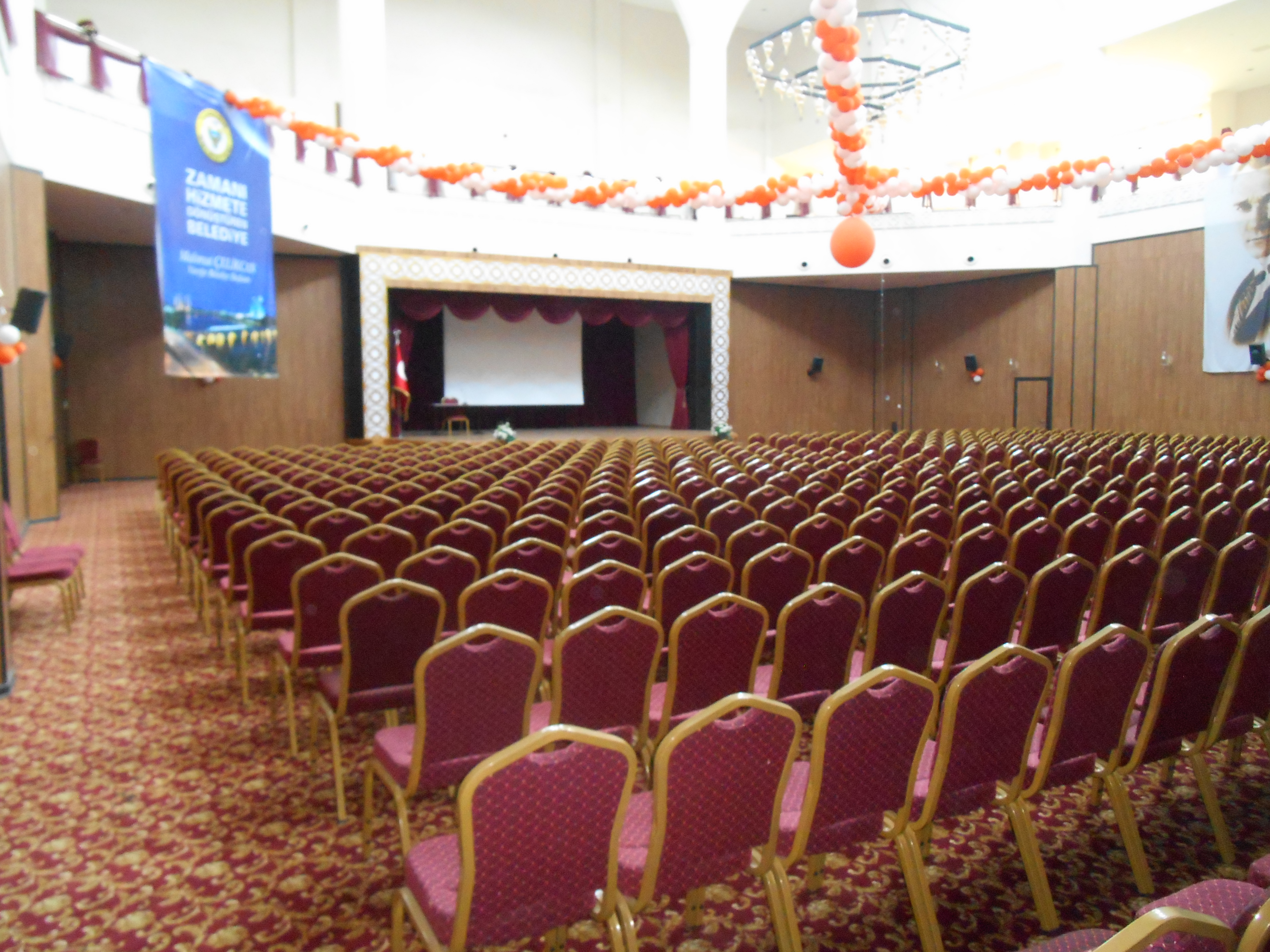

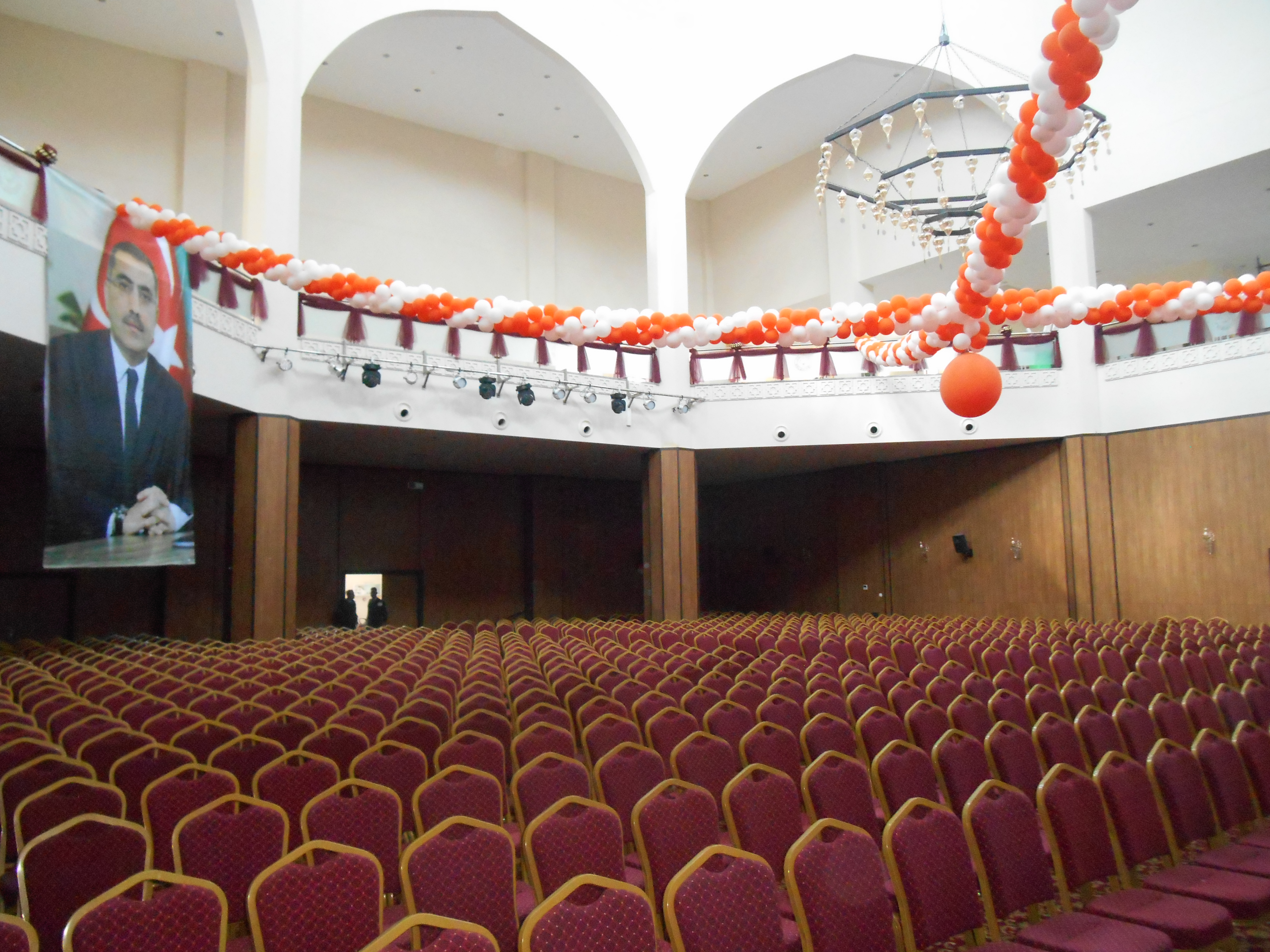

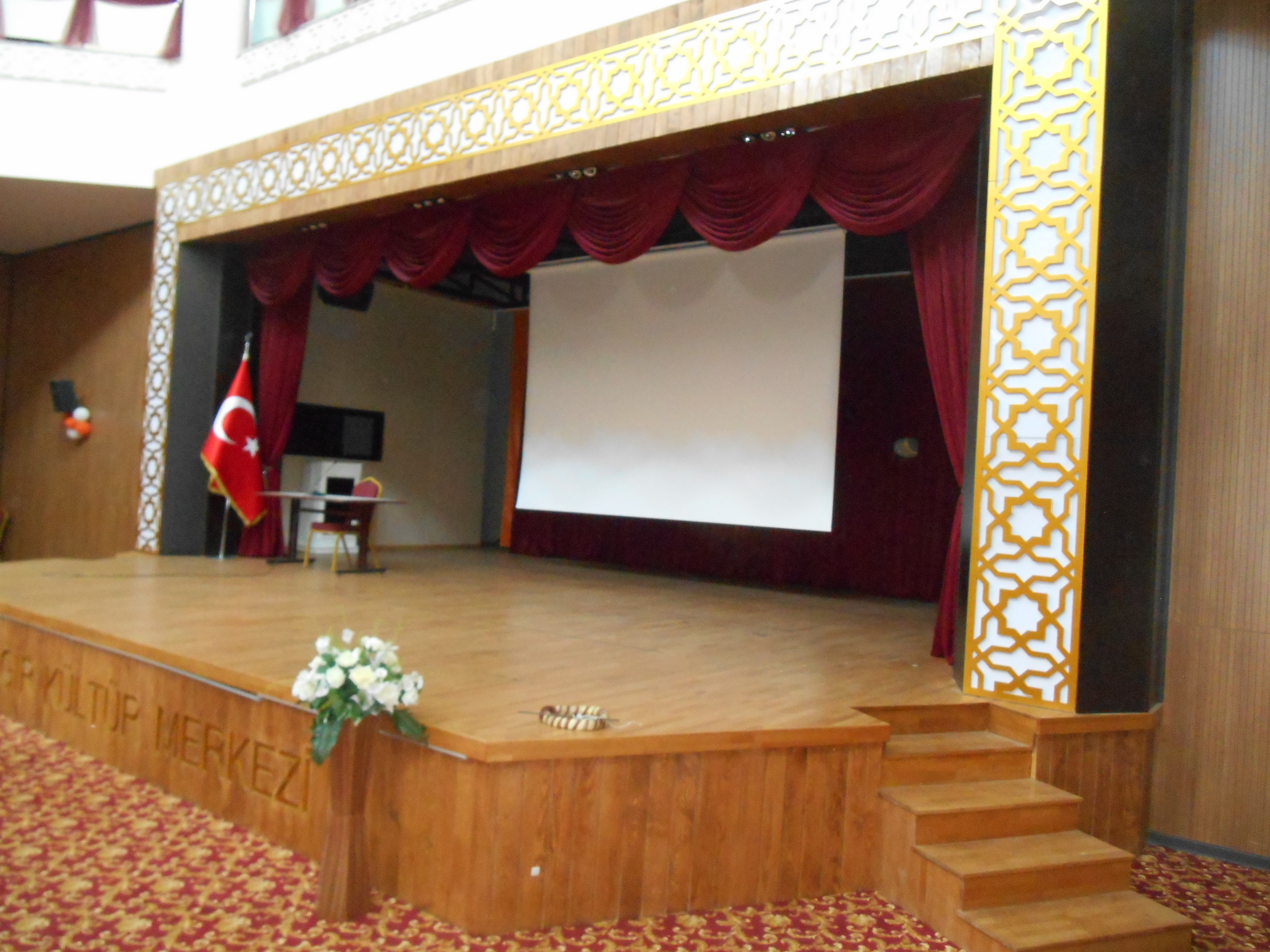
