= Kadıköy, Yüreğir =

Kadıköy
- Neighbourhood
- Location in Turkey
- Coordinates: 36.7642°N 35.2602°E
- Country: Turkey
- Province: Adana
- District: Yüreğir
- Population (2022): 315
- Time zone: UTC+3 (TRT)

Kadıköy is a neighbourhood and village in the municipality and district of Yüreğir, Adana Province, Turkey. Its population is 315 (2022).
