= Belören, Yüreğir =

Belören
- Neighbourhood
- Location in Turkey
- Coordinates: 36°48′43″N 35°33′32″E
- Country: Turkey
- Province: Adana
- District: Yüreğir
- Population (2022): 600
- Time zone: UTC+3 (TRT)

Belören is a neighbourhood in the municipality and district of Yüreğir, Adana Province, Turkey. Its population is 600 (2022).
