= Gökçeli, Yüreğir =

Gökçeli
- Neighbourhood
- Country: Turkey
- Province: Adana
- District: Yüreğir
- Population (2022): 246
- Time zone: UTC+3 (TRT)

Gökçeli is a neighbourhood in the municipality and district of Yüreğir, Adana Province, Turkey. Its population is 246 (2022). In 2010 it passed from the Karataş District to the Yüreğir District.
