= Düzce, Yüreğir =

Düzce
- Neighbourhood
- Location in Turkey
- Coordinates: 36.9000°N 35.4833°E
- Country: Turkey
- Province: Adana
- District: Yüreğir
- Population (2022): 87
- Time zone: UTC+3 (TRT)

Düzce is a neighbourhood in the municipality and district of Yüreğir, Adana Province, Turkey. Its population is 87 (2022).
