= Kaşlıca, Yüreğir =

Kaşlıca
- Neighbourhood
- Location in Turkey
- Coordinates: 36°52′23″N 35°37′10″E
- Country: Turkey
- Province: Adana
- District: Yüreğir
- Population (2022): 414
- Time zone: UTC+3 (TRT)

Kaşlıca, also known as Nacarlı, is a neighbourhood in the municipality and district of Yüreğir, Adana Province, Turkey. Its population is 414 (2022). The village is inhabited by Tahtacı.
