= Paşaköy, Yüreğir =

Paşaköy
- Neighbourhood
- Location in Turkey
- Coordinates: 36.8119°N 35.4110°E
- Country: Turkey
- Province: Adana
- District: Yüreğir
- Population (2022): 98
- Time zone: UTC+3 (TRT)

Paşaköy is a neighbourhood in the municipality and district of Yüreğir, Adana Province, Turkey. Its population is 98 (2022).
