= Irmakbaşı, Yüreğir =

Irmakbaşı
- Neighbourhood
- Location in Turkey
- Coordinates: 36°49′N 35°14′E
- Country: Turkey
- Province: Adana
- District: Yüreğir
- Population (2022): 255
- Time zone: UTC+3 (TRT)

Irmakbaşı is a neighbourhood in the municipality and district of Yüreğir, Adana Province, Turkey. Its population is 255 (2022).
