= Güveloğlu, Yüreğir =

Güveloğlu
- Neighbourhood
- Location within Turkey
- Coordinates: 36°51′N 35°36′E
- Country: Turkey
- Province: Adana
- District: Yüreğir
- Population (2022): 322
- Time zone: UTC+3 (TRT)

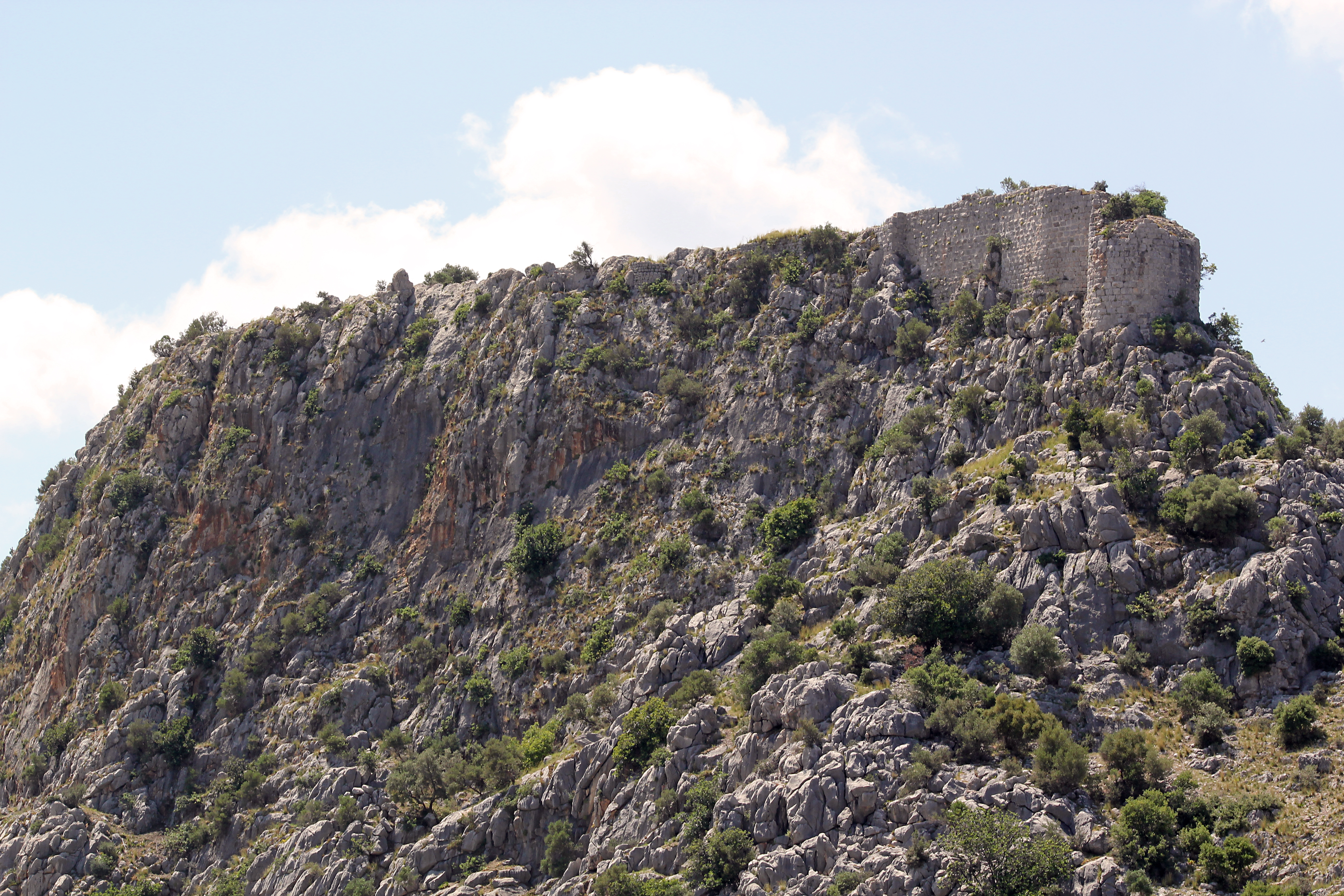

Güveloğlu is a neighbourhood in the municipality and district of Yüreğir, Adana Province, Turkey. Its population is 322 (2022).

Approximately 5 kilometers to the east of the town is the impressive fortress of Güveloğlu Kalesi, also known as Gökvelioğlu Castle. In 1965 G. R Young published a survey and description of this site. In 1987 Robert W. Edwards published improvements to his earlier plan and added many new observations. This castle has two large baileys that are defined by imposing walls, towers, and undercrofts at the northeast and southwest and sheer cliffs elsewhere. In the north or upper bailey is a huge cistern covered by barrel and groined vaults. Edwards discovered that the Byzantines are responsible for the first building period (perhaps with some Arab additions) and that the second building period, which defines most of the complex, is from the Armenian Kingdom of Cilicia during the 12th or 13th century. There is no evidence to associate Gökvelioğlu with the castle of Vaner, which appears in the coronation list of Leo I, King of Armenia. An extensive photographic survey and plan of Güveloğlu Castle was made between 1973 and 1981.
