= Kamışlı, Yüreğir =

Kamışlı
- Neighbourhood
- Country: Turkey
- Province: Adana
- District: Yüreğir
- Population (2022): 68
- Time zone: UTC+3 (TRT)

Kamışlı is a neighbourhood in the municipality and district of Yüreğir, Adana Province, Turkey. Its population is 68 (2022). In 2010 it passed from the Karataş District to the Yüreğir District.
