= Şahinağa, Yüreğir =

Şahinağa
- Neighbourhood
- Location in Turkey
- Coordinates: 36°48′N 35°24′E
- Country: Turkey
- Province: Adana
- District: Yüreğir
- Population (2022): 166
- Time zone: UTC+3 (TRT)

Şahinağa is a neighbourhood in the municipality and district of Yüreğir, Adana Province, Turkey. Its population is 166 (2022).
