= Herekli, Yüreğir =

Herekli
- Neighbourhood
- Location in Turkey
- Coordinates: 36.8632°N 35.5402°E
- Country: Turkey
- Province: Adana
- District: Yüreğir
- Population (2022): 126
- Time zone: UTC+3 (TRT)

Herekli is a neighbourhood in the municipality and district of Yüreğir, Adana Province, Turkey. Its population is 126 (2022).
