= Cırık, Yüreğir =

Cırık
- Neighbourhood
- Location in Turkey
- Coordinates: 36°44′26″N 35°13′58″E
- Country: Turkey
- Province: Adana
- District: Yüreğir
- Population (2022): 629
- Time zone: UTC+3 (TRT)

Cırık (also: Cırrık) is a neighbourhood in the municipality and district of Yüreğir, Adana Province, Turkey. Its population is 629 (2022). In 2010 it passed from the Karataş District to the Yüreğir District.
