= Denizkuyusu, Yüreğir =

Denizkuyusu
- Neighbourhood
- Location in Turkey
- Coordinates: 36°51′N 35°18′E
- Country: Turkey
- Province: Adana
- District: Yüreğir
- Population (2022): 256
- Time zone: UTC+3 (TRT)

Denizkuyusu is a neighbourhood in the municipality and district of Yüreğir, Adana Province, Turkey. Its population is 256 (2022).
