= Alihocalı, Yüreğir =

Alihocalı
- Neighbourhood
- Location within Turkey
- Coordinates: 36°56′N 35°24′E
- Country: Turkey
- Province: Adana
- District: Yüreğir
- Population (2022): 601
- Time zone: UTC+3 (TRT)

Alihocalı is a neighbourhood in the municipality and district of Yüreğir, Adana Province, Turkey. Its population is 601 (2022).

The neighbourhood is populated by Alawites
