= Hacıali, Yüreğir =

Hacıali
- Neighbourhood
- Location in Turkey
- Coordinates: 36.8066°N 35.2930°E
- Country: Turkey
- Province: Adana
- District: Yüreğir
- Population (2022): 677
- Time zone: UTC+3 (TRT)

Hacıali is a neighbourhood in the municipality and district of Yüreğir, Adana Province, Turkey. Its population is 677 (2022).
