= Kütüklü, Yüreğir =

Kütüklü
- Neighbourhood
- Country: Turkey
- Province: Adana
- District: Yüreğir
- Population (2022): 324
- Time zone: UTC+3 (TRT)

Kütüklü is a neighbourhood in the municipality and district of Yüreğir, Adana Province, Turkey. Its population is 324 (2022).
