= Ağzıbüyük, Yüreğir =

Ağzıbüyük
- Neighbourhood
- Location in Turkey
- Coordinates: 36.8636°N 35.4494°E
- Country: Turkey
- Province: Adana
- District: Yüreğir
- Population (2022): 303
- Time zone: UTC+3 (TRT)

Ağzıbüyük is a neighbourhood in the municipality and district of Yüreğir, Adana Province, Turkey. Its population is 303 (2022).
