= Yeniköy, Yüreğir =

Yeniköy
- Neighbourhood
- Location in Turkey
- Coordinates: 36.7859°N 35.2251°E
- Country: Turkey
- Province: Adana
- District: Yüreğir
- Population (2022): 168
- Time zone: UTC+3 (TRT)

Yeniköy is a neighbourhood in the municipality and district of Yüreğir, Adana Province, Turkey. Its population is 168 (2022).
