= Sağdıçlı, Yüreğir =

Sağdıçlı
- Neighbourhood
- Location in Turkey
- Coordinates: 36.8448°N 35.4428°E
- Country: Turkey
- Province: Adana
- District: Yüreğir
- Population (2022): 135
- Time zone: UTC+3 (TRT)

Sağdıçlı is a neighbourhood in the municipality and district of Yüreğir, Adana Province, Turkey. Its population is 135 (2022).
