= Şeyhmurat, Yüreğir =

Şeyhmurat
- Neighbourhood
- Location in Turkey
- Coordinates: 36°51′42″N 35°25′51″E
- Country: Turkey
- Province: Adana
- District: Yüreğir
- Population (2022): 792
- Time zone: UTC+3 (TRT)

Şeyhmurat is a neighbourhood in the municipality and district of Yüreğir, Adana Province, Turkey. Its population is 792 (2022).
