= Zağarlı, Yüreğir =

Zağarlı
- Neighbourhood
- Location in Turkey
- Coordinates: 36°47′N 35°22′E
- Country: Turkey
- Province: Adana
- District: Yüreğir
- Population (2022): 108
- Time zone: UTC+3 (TRT)

Zağarlı is a neighbourhood in the municipality and district of Yüreğir, Adana Province, Turkey. Its population is 108 (2022).
