= Çine, Yüreğir =

Çine
- Neighbourhood
- Location in Turkey
- Coordinates: 36.7974°N 35.2605°E
- Country: Turkey
- Province: Adana
- District: Yüreğir
- Population (2022): 164
- Time zone: UTC+3 (TRT)

Çine is a neighbourhood in the municipality and district of Yüreğir, Adana Province, Turkey. Its population is 164 (2022).
