= Danışment, Yüreğir =

Danışment
- Neighbourhood
- Location in Turkey
- Coordinates: 36.8259°N 35.4472°E
- Country: Turkey
- Province: Adana
- District: Yüreğir
- Population (2022): 278
- Time zone: UTC+3 (TRT)

Danışment is a neighbourhood in the municipality and district of Yüreğir, Adana Province, Turkey. Its population is 278 (2022).
