= Karaahmetli, Yüreğir =

Karaahmetli
- Neighbourhood
- Location in Turkey
- Coordinates: 36.8042°N 35.1866°E
- Country: Turkey
- Province: Adana
- District: Yüreğir
- Population (2022): 417
- Time zone: UTC+3 (TRT)

Karaahmetli is a neighbourhood in the municipality and district of Yüreğir, Adana Province, Turkey. Its population is 417 (2022).
