= Dedepınarı, Yüreğir =

Dedepınarı
- Neighbourhood
- Location in Turkey
- Coordinates: 36.9275°N 35.4816°E
- Country: Turkey
- Province: Adana
- District: Yüreğir
- Population (2022): 506
- Time zone: UTC+3 (TRT)

Dedepınarı is a neighbourhood in the municipality and district of Yüreğir, Adana Province, Turkey. Its population is 506 (2022).
