= List of populated places in Adana Province =

A list of populated places in Adana Province, Turkey by district:

== Aladağ ==
- Aladağ
- Akören, Aladağ
- Boztahta, Aladağ
- Büyüksofulu
- Ceritler
- Darılık
- Dayılar, Aladağ
- Dölekli
- Eğner
- Gerdibi
- Kabasakal
- Karahan
- Kıcak
- Kışlak, Aladağ
- Kızıldam
- Kökez
- Küp
- Madenli
- Mazılık
- Topallı
- Uzunkuyu
- Yetimli
- Yüksekören
- Gökçeköy
- Ebrişim
- Köprücük
- Posyağbasan
- Gireğiyeniköy

== Ceyhan ==
- Adapınar, Ceyhan
- Akdam, Ceyhan
- Altıgöz, Ceyhan
- Altıkara, Ceyhan
- Azizli, Ceyhan
- Ağaçlı, Ceyhan
- Ağaçpınar, Ceyhan
- Başören, Ceyhan
- Burhanlı, Ceyhan
- Büyükburhaniye, Ceyhan
- Büyükmangıt, Ceyhan
- Camızağılı, Ceyhan
- Ceyhan
- Ceyhanbekirli, Ceyhan
- Dağıstan, Ceyhan
- Degirmenli, Ceyhan
- Değirmendere, Ceyhan
- Dikilitaş, Ceyhan
- Dokuztekne, Ceyhan
- Dumlu, Ceyhan
- Durhasandede, Ceyhan
- Dutlupınar, Ceyhan
- Ekinyazı, Ceyhan
- Elmagölü, Ceyhan
- Erenler, Ceyhan
- Gümürdülü, Ceyhan
- Gündoğan, Ceyhan
- Günlüce, Ceyhan
- Günyazı, Ceyhan
- Hamdilli, Ceyhan
- Hamidiye, Ceyhan
- Hamitbey, Ceyhan
- Hamitbeybucağı, Ceyhan
- Irmaklı, Ceyhan
- Isırganlı, Ceyhan
- Karakayalı, Ceyhan
- Kurtkulağı, Ceyhan
- Kurtpınar, Ceyhan
- Kuzucak, Ceyhan
- Köprülü, Ceyhan
- Körkuyu, Ceyhan
- Kösreli, Ceyhan
- Küçükburhaniye, Ceyhan
- Küçükmangıt, Ceyhan
- Kılıçkaya, Ceyhan
- Kıvrıklı, Ceyhan
- Kızıldere, Ceyhan
- Mercimek, Ceyhan
- Mustafabeyli, Ceyhan
- Narlık, Ceyhan
- Sarıbahçe, Ceyhan
- Sarıkeçili, Ceyhan
- Sağkaya, Ceyhan
- Sağırlar, Ceyhan
- Selimiye, Ceyhan
- Sirkeli, Ceyhan
- Soysalı, Ceyhan
- Soğukpınar, Ceyhan
- Tatarlı, Ceyhan
- Tatlıkuyu, Ceyhan
- Toktamış, Ceyhan
- Yalak, Ceyhan
- Yellibel, Ceyhan
- Yeniköynazımbey, Ceyhan
- Yeşilbahçe, Ceyhan
- Yeşildam, Ceyhan
- Yılankale, Ceyhan
- Çakaldere, Ceyhan
- Çataklı, Ceyhan
- Çatalhüyük, Ceyhan
- Çevretepe, Ceyhan
- Çiftlikler, Ceyhan
- Çiçekli, Ceyhan
- Çokçapınar, Ceyhan
- Üçdutyeşilova, Ceyhan
- İmran, Ceyhan
- İncetarla, Ceyhan
- İnceyer, Ceyhan
- İsalı, Ceyhan

== Çukurova ==
- Çukurova
- Bozcalar, Çukurova
- Dörtler, Çukurova
- Fadıl, Çukurova
- Kabasakal, Çukurova
- Karahan, Çukurova
- Kaşoba, Çukurova
- Küçükçınar, Çukurova
- Memişli, Çukurova
- Örcün, Çukurova
- Pirili, Çukurova
- Söğütlü, Çukurova
- Şambayadı, Çukurova

== Feke ==
- Akkaya, Feke
- Akoluk, Feke
- Bahçecik, Feke
- Bağdatlı, Feke
- Değirmenciuşağı, Feke
- Feke
- Gaffaruşağı, Feke
- Gedikli, Feke
- Göbelli, Feke
- Görbeyaz, Feke
- Gürümze, Feke
- Güzpınarı, Feke
- Hıdıruşağı, Feke
- Kaleyüzü, Feke
- Kayadibi, Feke
- Kaşaltı, Feke
- Konakkuran, Feke
- Kovukçınar, Feke
- Koçyazı, Feke
- Kırıkuşağı, Feke
- Kısacıklı, Feke
- Kızılyer, Feke
- Mansurlu, Feke
- Mansurlu-bucak merkezi, Feke
- Musalar, Feke
- Olucak, Feke
- Ormancık, Feke
- Ortaköy, Feke
- Oruçlu, Feke
- Paşalı, Feke
- Süphandere, Feke
- Tenkerli, Feke
- Tokmanaklı, Feke
- Tortulu, Feke
- Uğurlubağ, Feke
- Yaylapınar, Feke
- Yerebakan, Feke
- Çandırlar, Feke
- Çondu, Feke
- Çürükler, Feke
- İncirci, Feke
- Şahmuratlı, Feke

== Karaisalı ==
- Aktaş, Karaisalı
- Akçalı, Karaisalı
- Altınova, Karaisalı
- Ayakkıf, Karaisalı
- Aşağıbelemedik, Karaisalı
- Aşağıyirikler, Karaisalı
- Barakdağı, Karaisalı
- Başkıf, Karaisalı
- Bekirli, Karaisalı
- Beydemir, Karaisalı
- Bolacalı, Karaisalı
- Boztahta, Karaisalı
- Bucak, Karaisalı
- Demirçit, Karaisalı
- Durak, Karaisalı
- Emelcik, Karaisalı
- Etekli, Karaisalı
- Eğlence, Karaisalı
- Gildirli, Karaisalı
- Gökhasanlı, Karaisalı
- Gökkuyu, Karaisalı
- Gülüşlü, Karaisalı
- Güvenç, Karaisalı
- Hacılı, Karaisalı
- Hacımusalı, Karaisalı
- Kaledağı, Karaisalı
- Kapıkaya, Karaisalı
- Karahasanlı, Karaisalı
- Karaisalı
- Karakuyu, Karaisalı
- Karakılıç, Karaisalı
- Karayusuflu, Karaisalı
- Kocaveliler, Karaisalı
- Kuyucu, Karaisalı
- Kuzgun, Karaisalı
- Kuşcusofulu, Karaisalı
- Körüklü, Karaisalı
- Kösefakılı, Karaisalı
- Kıralan, Karaisalı
- Kırıklı, Karaisalı
- Maraşlı, Karaisalı
- Murtçukuru, Karaisalı
- Nergizlik, Karaisalı
- Nuhlu, Karaisalı
- Sadıkali, Karaisalı
- Salbaş, Karaisalı
- Sarıkonak, Karaisalı
- Tatık, Karaisalı
- Topaktaş, Karaisalı
- Topraklı, Karaisalı
- Torunsolaklı, Karaisalı
- Tümenli, Karaisalı
- Yazıbaşı, Karaisalı
- Çakallı, Karaisalı
- Çatalan, Karaisalı
- Çevlik, Karaisalı
- Çocuklar, Karaisalı
- Çorlu, Karaisalı
- Çukur, Karaisalı
- Ömerli, Karaisalı

== Karataş ==
- Adalı, Karataş
- Ataköy, Karataş
- Bahçe, Karataş
- Bebeli, Karataş
- Beyköyü, Karataş
- Cırık, Karataş
- Damlapınar, Karataş
- Develiören, Karataş
- Dolaplı, Karataş
- Eğriağaç, Karataş
- Gökçeli, Karataş
- Gölkaya, Karataş
- Gümüşyazı, Karataş
- Hacıhasan, Karataş
- Hasırağacı, Karataş
- Helvacı, Karataş
- Kamışlı, Karataş
- Kapı, Karataş
- Karagöçer, Karataş
- Karataş, Karataş
- Karataş, Adana
- Kesik, Karataş
- Kiremitli, Karataş
- Köprügözü, Karataş
- Kırhasan, Karataş
- Kızıltahta, Karataş
- Meletmez, Karataş
- Oymaklı, Karataş
- Sarımsaklı, Karataş
- Sirkenli, Karataş
- Tabaklar, Karataş
- Tabur, Karataş
- Terliksiz, Karataş
- Topraklı, Karataş
- Tuzkuyusu, Karataş
- Tuzla, Karataş
- Yanlızca, Karataş
- Yassıören, Karataş
- Yemişli, Karataş
- Yenice, Karataş
- Yenimurat, Karataş
- Yüzbaşı, Karataş
- Çakırören, Karataş
- Çakşırlı, Karataş
- Çavuşlu, Karataş
- Çimeli, Karataş
- Çukurkamış, Karataş
- İnnaplıhüyüğü, Karataş
- İsahacılı, Karataş

== Kozan ==
- Acarmantaş, Kozan
- Akarca, Kozan
- Akdam, Kozan
- Akkaya, Kozan
- Akçalıuşağı, Kozan
- Alapınar, Kozan
- Andıl, Kozan
- Arslanlı, Kozan
- Aydın, Kozan
- Ayşehoca, Kozan
- Bağözü, Kozan
- Boztahta, Kozan
- Bucakköy, Kozan
- Bulduklu, Kozan
- Damyeri, Kozan
- Dağlıca, Kozan
- Dikilitaş, Kozan
- Dilekkaya, Kozan
- Doğanalanı, Kozan
- Duraluşağı, Kozan
- Durmuşlu, Kozan
- Düzağaç, Kozan
- Ergenuşağı, Kozan
- Eskikabasakal, Kozan
- Eskimantaş, Kozan
- Faydalı, Kozan
- Ferhatlı, Kozan
- Gaziköy, Kozan
- Gedikli, Kozan
- Gökgöz, Kozan
- Gökçeyol, Kozan
- Güneri, Kozan
- Hacıbeyli, Kozan
- Hacımirzalı, Kozan
- Henüzçakırı, Kozan
- Ilıcaköy, Kozan
- Işıkkaya, Kozan
- Işıklı, Kozan
- Kabaktepe, Kozan
- Kalkumaç, Kozan
- Kapıkaya, Kozan
- Karabucak, Kozan
- Karacaören, Kozan
- Karahamzalı, Kozan
- Karanebili, Kozan
- Kemer, Kozan
- Kozan
- Kuytucak, Kozan
- Kuyubeli, Kozan
- Kuyuluk, Kozan
- Köseli, Kozan
- Kıbrıslar, Kozan
- Kızlarsekisi, Kozan
- Kızıllar, Kozan
- Mahyalar, Kozan
- Marankeçili, Kozan
- Minnetli, Kozan
- Oruçlu, Kozan
- Pekmezci, Kozan
- Postkabasakal, Kozan
- Salmanlı, Kozan
- Tepecikören, Kozan
- Tufanlı, Kozan
- Turgutlu, Kozan
- Turunçlu, Kozan
- Velicanlı, Kozan
- Yanalerik, Kozan
- Yassıçalı, Kozan
- Yeniköy, Kozan
- Yukarıkeçili, Kozan
- Yüksekören, Kozan
- Zerdali, Kozan
- Çamdere, Kozan
- Çamlarca, Kozan
- Çandık, Kozan
- Çelenuşağı, Kozan
- Çobanpınarı, Kozan
- Çokak, Kozan
- Çukurören, Kozan
- Çulluuşağı, Kozan
- Çürüklü, Kozan
- Örendere, Kozan
- Özbaşı, Kozan
- İdemköy, Kozan
- Şerifli, Kozan

== Pozantı ==
- Akçatekir, Pozantı
- Alpu, Pozantı
- Aşçıbekirli, Pozantı
- Belemedik, Pozantı
- Dağdibi, Pozantı
- Eskikonacık, Pozantı
- Fındıklı, Pozantı
- Gökbez, Pozantı
- Hamidiye, Pozantı
- Kamışlı, Pozantı
- Karakışlakçı, Pozantı
- Pozantı
- Yazıcık, Pozantı
- Yağlıtaş, Pozantı
- Yenikonacık, Pozantı
- Yukarıbelemedik, Pozantı
- Çamlıbel, Pozantı
- Ömerli, Pozantı

== Saimbeyli ==
- Aksaağaç, Saimbeyli
- Avcıpınarı, Saimbeyli
- Ayvacık, Saimbeyli
- Beypınarı, Saimbeyli
- Cumhurlu, Saimbeyli
- Cıvıklı, Saimbeyli
- Değirmenciuşağı, Saimbeyli
- Eyüplü, Saimbeyli
- Gökmenler, Saimbeyli
- Gürleşen, Saimbeyli
- Halilbeyli, Saimbeyli
- Himmetli, Saimbeyli
- Kandilli, Saimbeyli
- Kapaklıkuyu, Saimbeyli
- Karakuyu, Saimbeyli
- Kızılağaç, Saimbeyli
- Mahmutlu, Saimbeyli
- Naltaş, Saimbeyli
- Payamburnu, Saimbeyli
- Saimbeyli
- Tülü, Saimbeyli
- Yardibi, Saimbeyli
- Yeniköy, Saimbeyli
- Çatak, Saimbeyli
- Çeralan, Saimbeyli
- Çorak, Saimbeyli

== Sarıçam ==
- Akkuyu, Sarıçam
- Baklalı, Sarıçam
- Buruk, Sarıçam
- Cihadiye, Sarıçam
- Kürkçüler, Sarıçam
- Sarıçam, Adana
- Sofulu, Sarıçam
- Suluca, Sarıçam
- İncirlik, Sarıçam

== Seyhan ==
- Büyükdikili, Seyhan
- Büyükçıldırım, Seyhan
- Camuzcu, Seyhan
- Dervişler, Seyhan
- Dörtağaç, Seyhan
- Gökçeler, Seyhan
- Gölbaşı, Seyhan
- Hadırlı, Seyhan
- Karakuyu, Seyhan
- Karayusuflu, Seyhan
- Karslı, Seyhan
- Kayışlı, Seyhan
- Kireçocağı, Seyhan
- Koyuncu, Seyhan
- Kurttepe, Seyhan
- Kuyumcular, Seyhan
- Köylüoğlu, Seyhan
- Küçükdikili, Seyhan
- Küçükçıldırım, Seyhan
- Mürseloğlu, Seyhan
- Salmanbeyli, Seyhan
- Sarıhamzalı, Seyhan
- Sarıhuğlar, Seyhan
- Seyhan, Seyhan
- Yalmanlı, Seyhan
- Yenidam, Seyhan
- Yolgeçen, Seyhan
- Zeytinli, Seyhan
- Çakalkuyusu, Seyhan
- Çaputçu, Seyhan
- Çukurova, Adana

== Tufanbeyli ==
- Akpınar, Tufanbeyli
- Akçal, Tufanbeyli
- Ayvat, Tufanbeyli
- Bozgüney, Tufanbeyli
- Damlalı, Tufanbeyli
- Demiroluk, Tufanbeyli
- Doğanbeyli, Tufanbeyli
- Doğanlı, Tufanbeyli
- Evci, Tufanbeyli
- Fatmakuyu, Tufanbeyli
- Güzelim, Tufanbeyli
- Hanyeri, Tufanbeyli
- Karsavuran, Tufanbeyli
- Kayapınar, Tufanbeyli
- Kayarcık, Tufanbeyli
- Kirazlıyurt, Tufanbeyli
- Koçcağız, Tufanbeyli
- Ortaköy, Tufanbeyli
- Pekmezli, Tufanbeyli
- Polatpınarı, Tufanbeyli
- Pınarlar, Tufanbeyli
- Taşpınar, Tufanbeyli
- Tufanbeyli
- Tozlu, Tufanbeyli
- Yamanlı, Tufanbeyli
- Yeşilova, Tufanbeyli
- Çakırlar, Tufanbeyli
- Çatalçam, Tufanbeyli
- Çukurkışla, Tufanbeyli
- İğdebel, Tufanbeyli
- Şarköy, Tufanbeyli

== Yumurtalık ==
- Asmalı, Yumurtalık
- Ayvalık, Yumurtalık
- Demirtaş, Yumurtalık
- Deveciuşağı, Yumurtalık
- Gölovası, Yumurtalık
- Hamzalı, Yumurtalık
- Haylazlı, Yumurtalık
- Kaldırım, Yumurtalık
- Kalemli, Yumurtalık
- Kesmeburun, Yumurtalık
- Kuzupınarı, Yumurtalık
- Kırmızıdam, Yumurtalık
- Narlıören, Yumurtalık
- Sugözü, Yumurtalık
- Yahşiler, Yumurtalık
- Yeniköy, Yumurtalık
- Yeşilköy, Yumurtalık
- Yumurtalık
- Zeytinbeli, Yumurtalık

== Yüreğir ==
- Abdioğlu, Yüreğir
- Aflak, Yüreğir
- Akdam, Yüreğir
- Akpınar, Yüreğir
- Alihocalı, Yüreğir
- Avcılar, Yüreğir
- Aydıncık, Yüreğir
- Aydınyurdu, Yüreğir
- Ayvalı, Yüreğir
- Ağzıbüyük, Yüreğir
- Bayramhacılı, Yüreğir
- Belören, Yüreğir
- Beyceli, Yüreğir
- Boynuyoğun, Yüreğir
- Boztepe, Yüreğir
- Büyükkapılı, Yüreğir
- Camili, Yüreğir
- Cerenli, Yüreğir
- Danışment, Yüreğir
- Dedepınarı, Yüreğir
- Denizkuyusu, Yüreğir
- Doğankent, Yüreğir
- Dutluca, Yüreğir
- Düzce, Yüreğir
- Esenler, Yüreğir
- Eğeciuşağı, Yüreğir
- Geçitli, Yüreğir
- Gökbüket, Yüreğir
- Güveloğlu, Yüreğir
- Hacıali, Yüreğir
- Hakkıbeyli, Yüreğir
- Hasanbeyli, Yüreğir
- Havutlu, Yüreğir
- Herekli, Yüreğir
- Hocallı, Yüreğir
- Irmakbaşı, Yüreğir
- Kadıköy, Yüreğir
- Karaahmetli, Yüreğir
- Karayusuflu, Yüreğir
- Karaömerli, Yüreğir
- Kargakekeç, Yüreğir
- Karlık, Yüreğir
- Kayarlı, Yüreğir
- Kaşlıca, Yüreğir
- Kaşobası, Yüreğir
- Kepeztepe, Yüreğir
- Köklüce, Yüreğir
- Kösefakılı, Yüreğir
- Kütüklü, Yüreğir
- Kılbaş, Yüreğir
- Kılıçlı, Yüreğir
- Kızılkaş, Yüreğir
- Maltepe, Yüreğir
- Menekşe, Yüreğir
- Mustafalar, Yüreğir
- Paşaköy, Yüreğir
- Sarıçam, Yüreğir
- Sağdıçlı, Yüreğir
- Solaklı, Yüreğir
- Turunçlu, Yüreğir
- Vayvaylı, Yüreğir
- Yakapınar, Yüreğir
- Yarımca, Yüreğir
- Yağızlar, Yüreğir
- Yeniköy, Yüreğir
- Yeniyayla, Yüreğir
- Yerdelen, Yüreğir
- Yukarıçiçekli, Yüreğir
- Yunusoğlu, Yüreğir
- Yüreğir
- Zağarlı, Yüreğir
- Çamlıca, Yüreğir
- Çarkıpare, Yüreğir
- Çatalpınar, Yüreğir
- Çaylı, Yüreğir
- Çağırganlı, Yüreğir
- Çelemli, Yüreğir
- Çine, Yüreğir
- Çirişgediği, Yüreğir
- Çiçekli, Yüreğir
- Çotlu, Yüreğir
- Çınarlı, Yüreğir
- Ünlüce, Yüreğir
- Şahinağa, Yüreğir
- Şıhmurat, Yüreğir
- İncirlik, Yüreğir
- İncirlik Hava Üssü

== İmamoğlu ==
- Alaybeyi, İmamoğlu
- Ayvalı, İmamoğlu
- Ağzıkaraca, İmamoğlu
- Camili, İmamoğlu
- Danacılı, İmamoğlu
- Faydalı, İmamoğlu
- Hacıhasanlı, İmamoğlu
- Koyunevi, İmamoğlu
- Malıhıdırlı, İmamoğlu
- Otluk, İmamoğlu
- Sayca, İmamoğlu
- Saygeçit, İmamoğlu
- Sevinçli, İmamoğlu
- Sokutaş, İmamoğlu
- Ufacıkören, İmamoğlu
- Uluçınar, İmamoğlu
- Yazıtepe, İmamoğlu
- Çörten, İmamoğlu
- Üçtepe, İmamoğlu
- İmamoğlu, Adana

== Recent development ==
According to Law act no 6360, all Turkish provinces with a population more than 750 000, were renamed as metropolitan municipality. All districts in those provinces became second level municipalities and all villages in those districts were renamed as a neighborhoods . Thus the villages listed above are officially neighborhoods of Adana.
