= Ceyhan-Kırıkkale Oil Pipeline =

Turkish crude oil pipeline

Ceyhan–Kırıkkale Oil Pipeline
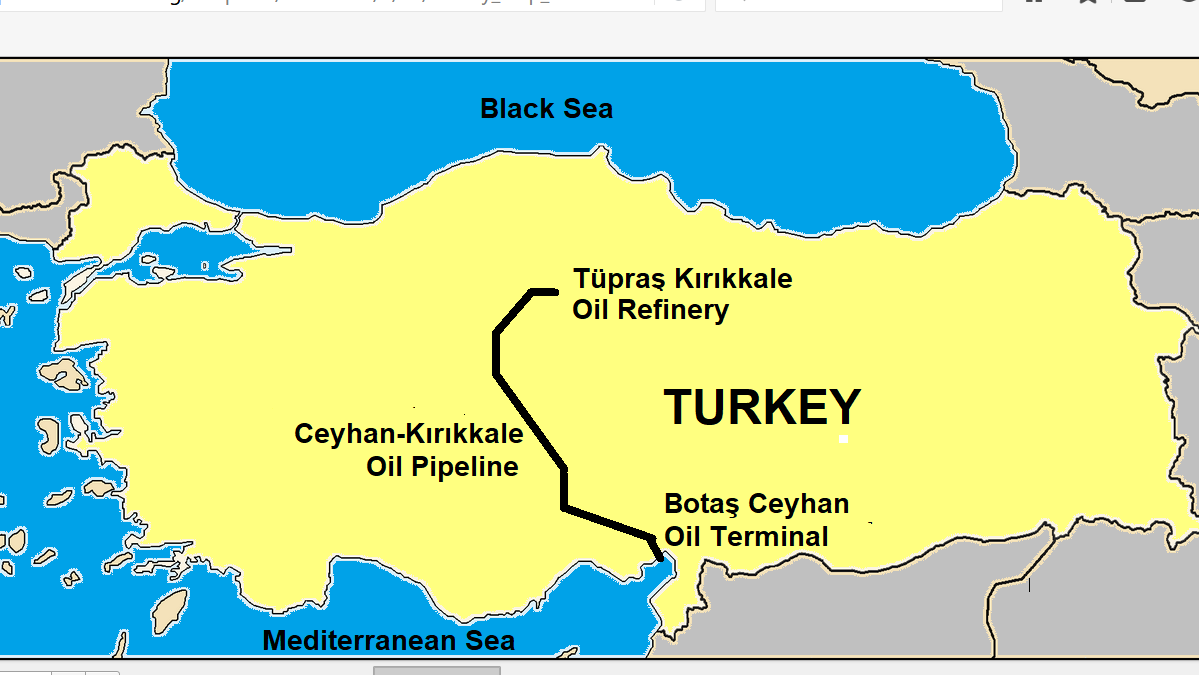
- Location of Ceyhan–Kırıkkale Oil Pipeline

Location
- Country: Turkey
- Direction: south-north
- Start: Ceyhan, Turkey
- To: Kırıkkale, Turkey

General information
- Type: Crude oil
- Operator: Botaş
- Commissioned: 1986; 40 years ago

Technical information
- Length: 457 km (284 mi)
- Maximum discharge: 1,140 m^{3}/h (40,000 cu ft/h)

Ceyhan–Kırıkkale Oil Pipeline (Turkish: Ceyhan–Kırıkkale Ham Petrol Boru Hattı), also known as Yumurtalık (Ceyhan)–Kırıkkale Oil Pipeline (Turkish: Yumurtalık (Ceyhan)–Kırıkkale Ham Petrol Boru Hattı) is a crude oil pipeline between Ceyhan and Kırıkkale in Turkey. It is owned and operated by the state-owned company Botaş.

== Background ==
The construction of the Ceyhan–Kırıkkale Oil Pipeline began in May 1983 and completed in February 1986. It was built by the Tekfen Construction and Installation. The 457 km (284 mi)-long pipeline crosses steep slopes of Taurus Mountains. The pipeline was commissioned in 1986 to make the 1986-built Kırıkkale Refinery operational.

== Technical features ==
The pipeline transports crude oil from Botaş Ceyhan Oil Terminal to Tüpraş Kırıkkale Oil Refinery for refining purpose. Botaş Ceyhan Oil Terminal is located in Ceyhan, Adana Province in southern Turkey on the northern coast of Gulf of Alexandretta at northeastern Mediterranean Sea. Tüpraş Kırıkkale Oil Refinery is located in Kırıkkale Province, central Anatolia.

The Botaş Ceyhan Oil terminal is the end point of the Kirkuk–Ceyhan Oil Pipeline carrying crude oil from Iraq to Turkey. The Ceyhan Terminal has twelve oil storage tanks, each with 135,000 m^{3} (4,800,000 cu ft) capacity. At the arrival point of the pipeline, the refinery has one storage tank of 1,500 m^{3} (53,000 cu ft) capacity. The pipeline's discharge capacity is 1,000–1,140 m^{3}/h (35,000–40,000 cu ft/h) or annually 6,000,000–7,000,000 m^{3} (210,000,000–250,000,000 cu ft) for crude oil of 23–47 API gravity, equivalent to 7.2 million tonnes per year. In 2016, a total of 4.9 million tonnes (35,4 million barrels) were transported. The source of the transported oil is either Iraq by the Kirkuk–Ceyhan Pipeline or local or imported oil by sea.

== Oil theft ==
From time to time, the pipeline becomes subject to oil theft. In 2006, thieves were caught in Çakaldere, Ceyhan village, Adana after they tapped oil from the pipeline into a tank truck. Thieves were caught in the act the same year after having loaded 30 t (30 long tons; 33 short tons) oil to a tank truck from the pipeline in Yüreğir district of Adana. In Yılankale, Ceyhan village, thieves caused a fire at the pipeline in 2007 as they tried to bore a hole in the pipeline. Damage in the environment arose through oil spilled out. In Kılıçlı, Yüreğir village, thieves were arrested in 2009 while they were loading a 20-t tank truck by a hose from a hole in the pipeline. In 2013, an illegal built pipeline in a length of 1,800 m (5,900 ft) was discovered between Adana and Aksaray. It was jointed to the main pipeline 4 m (13 ft) under surface. In 2017, fire broke out again at the pipeline in Sarıçam, Yüreğir of Adana as the thieves tried to install a valve on the pipeline by welder.
