= Ceyhan (disambiguation) =

Ceyhan is a Turkish word. It may refer to:

== People ==
- Ceyhan Coşkunsu (born 2002), Turkish female handballer
- Ceyhan Yazar (born 1944), Turkish former footballer

== Places ==
- Ceyhan, a district in Adana Province, Turkey
- Ceyhanbekirli, Ceyhan, a neighborhood in Ceyhan District of Adana Province, Turkey

== Other uses ==
- Ceyhan River, a river in southern Turkey
- Ceyhan-Kırıkkale Oil Pipeline, a crude oil pipeline between Cehan and Kırıkkale in Turkey
- Ceyhan spring minnow, a species of freshwater ray-finned fish
- Ceyhan railway station, railway station of Ceyhan in Turkey
- Ceyhanspor, football club in Ceyhan, Turkey

- Ceyhan scraper, a freshwater cyprinid fish
