= Kirkota =

Town of ancient Cilicia inhabited during Byzantine times

Coordinates: 36°56′42″N 35°40′55″E

Kirkota was a town of ancient Cilicia inhabited during Byzantine times. Its name does not occur in ancient authors but is inferred from epigraphic and other evidence.

Its site is located near Kızıldere in Asiatic Turkey.
