= Burhanlı =

Burhanlı can refer to:

- Burhanlı, Ceyhan
- Burhanlı, Gelibolu
- Burhanlı, Kastamonu
