= Yeşilbahçe =

Yeşilbahçe can refer to:

- Yeşilbahçe, Ceyhan
- Yeşilbahçe, Silvan
