= Günlüce =

Günlüce may refer to:

- Günlüce, Ceyhan, village in Adana Province, Turkey
- Günlüce, Ödemiş, village in Izmir Province, Turkey
- Günlüce, Oltu
- Günlüce, Posof, village in Ardahan Province, Turkey
- Günlüce, Sason, village in Batman Province, Turkey
