= Irmaklı =

Irmaklı is a Turkish place name and it may refer to

- Irmaklı, Ceyhan a village in Adana Province
- Irmaklı, Mut a village in Mersin Province
- Irmaklı, Darende a village in Malatya Province
