= Mustafabeyli =

Mustafabeyli is a Turkic place name and may refer to:

- Mustafabeyli, Adana, a town in Ceyhan district of Adana Province, Turkey
- Mustafabəyli, a village in Saatly Rayon, Azerbaijan
