= Kuzucak =

Kuzucak can refer to:

- Kuzucak, Ceyhan
- Kuzucak, Sungurlu
