= Sağırlar =

Sağırlar can refer to:

- Sağırlar, Ceyhan
- Sağırlar, Ilgaz
