= Soysallı, Ceyhan =

Soysallı
- Neighbourhood
- Location in Turkey
- Coordinates: 37.1431°N 35.6692°E
- Country: Turkey
- Province: Adana
- District: Ceyhan
- Population (2022): 744
- Time zone: UTC+3 (TRT)

Soysallı is a neighbourhood in the municipality and district of Ceyhan, Adana Province, Turkey. Its population is 744 (2022).
