= Kılıçkaya, Ceyhan =

Kılıçkaya
- Neighbourhood
- Location in Turkey
- Coordinates: 36.8780°N 35.7053°E
- Country: Turkey
- Province: Adana
- District: Ceyhan
- Population (2022): 275
- Time zone: UTC+3 (TRT)

Kılıçkaya is a neighbourhood in the municipality and district of Ceyhan, Adana Province, Turkey. Its population is 275 (2022).
