= Çataklı, Ceyhan =

Çataklı
- Neighbourhood
- Location in Turkey
- Coordinates: 37.1303°N 36.0558°E
- Country: Turkey
- Province: Adana
- District: Ceyhan
- Population (2022): 455
- Time zone: UTC+3 (TRT)

Çataklı is a neighbourhood in the municipality and district of Ceyhan, Adana Province, Turkey. Its population is 455 (2022).
