= Büyükburhaniye, Ceyhan =

Büyükburhaniye
- Neighbourhood
- Location in Turkey
- Coordinates: 37.0550°N 35.6896°E
- Country: Turkey
- Province: Adana
- District: Ceyhan
- Population (2022): 105
- Time zone: UTC+3 (TRT)

Büyükburhaniye is a neighbourhood in the municipality and district of Ceyhan, Adana Province, Turkey. Its population is 105 (2022).
