= Küçükmangıt, Ceyhan =

Küçükmangıt
- Neighbourhood
- Location in Turkey
- Coordinates: 37°04′N 35°48′E
- Country: Turkey
- Province: Adana
- District: Ceyhan
- Population (2022): 283
- Time zone: UTC+3 (TRT)

Küçükmangıt is a neighbourhood in the municipality and district of Ceyhan, Adana Province, Turkey. Its population is 283 (2022).
