= Yeşildam, Ceyhan =

Yeşildam
- Neighbourhood
- Location in Turkey
- Coordinates: 37°14′N 35°53′E
- Country: Turkey
- Province: Adana
- District: Ceyhan
- Population (2022): 339
- Time zone: UTC+3 (TRT)

Yeşildam is a neighbourhood in the municipality and district of Ceyhan, Adana Province, Turkey. Its population is 339 (2022).
