= Değirmenli, Ceyhan =

Coordinates: 37.0877°N 35.9975°E

Değirmenli
- Neighbourhood
- Location in Turkey
- Coordinates
- Country: Turkey
- Province: Adana
- District: Ceyhan
- Population (2022): 161
- Time zone: UTC+3 (TRT)

Değirmenli is a neighbourhood in the municipality and district of Ceyhan, Adana Province, Turkey. Its population is 161 (2022).
