= Kurtkulağı, Ceyhan =

Kurtkulağı
- Neighbourhood
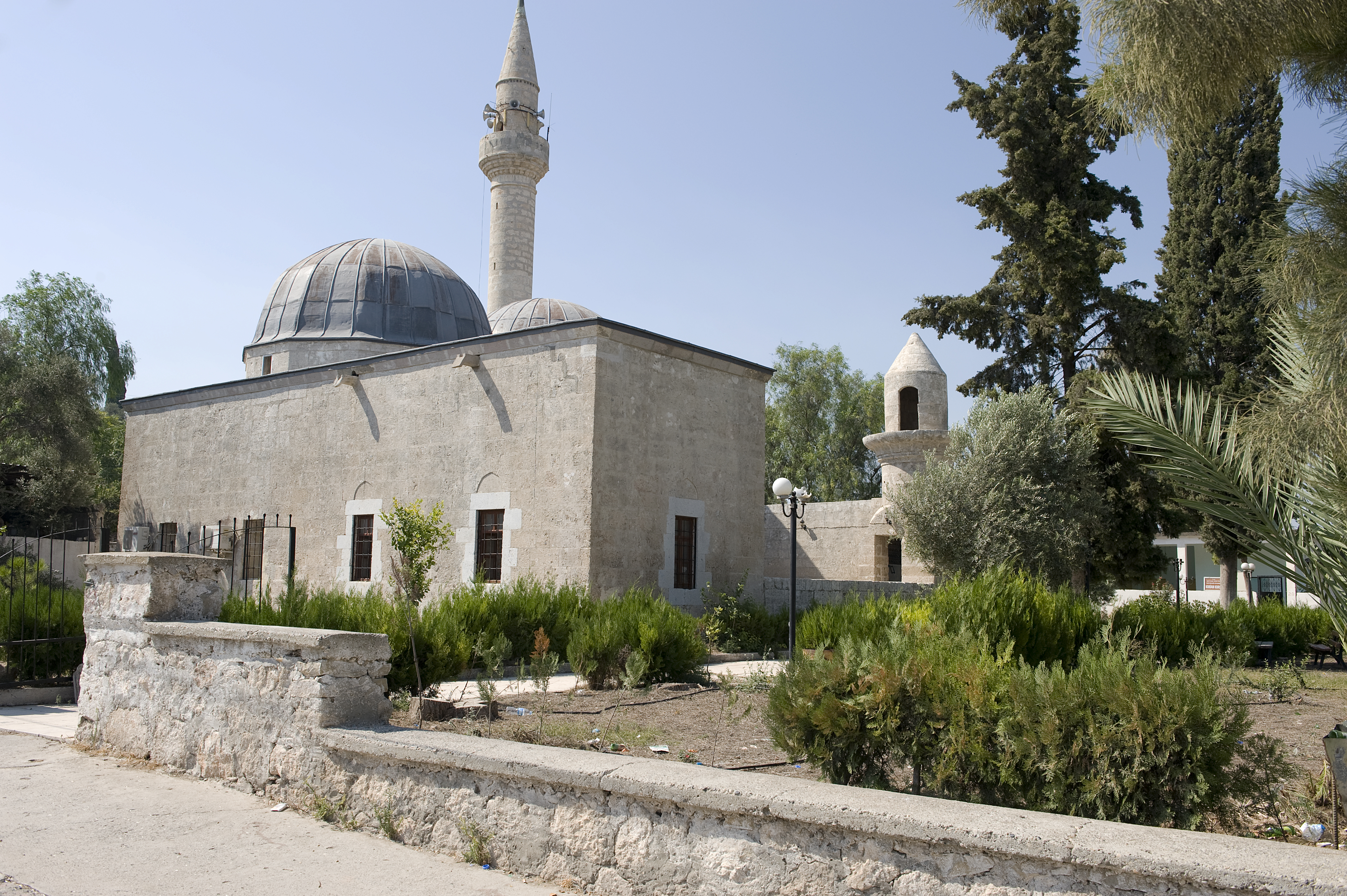

- Location within Turkey
- Coordinates: 36°55′25″N 35°53′08″E
- Country: Turkey
- Province: Adana
- District: Ceyhan
- Population (2022): 1,144
- Time zone: UTC+3 (TRT)

Kurtkulağı is a neighbourhood of the municipality and district of Ceyhan, Adana Province, Turkey. Its population is 1,144 (2022). Before the 2013 reorganisation, it was a town (belde). Kurtkulağı Kervansarayı is in the village. There also is a mosque nearby, both stem from the time the Silk Road passed through this village.
