= Hamitbeybucağı, Ceyhan =

Hamitbeybucağı
- Neighbourhood
- Location in Turkey
- Coordinates: 37°06′N 35°49′E
- Country: Turkey
- Province: Adana
- District: Ceyhan
- Population (2022): 394
- Time zone: UTC+3 (TRT)

Hamitbeybucağı is a neighbourhood in the municipality and district of Ceyhan, Adana Province, Turkey. Its population is 394 (2022).
