= Veysiye, Ceyhan =

Veysiye
- Neighbourhood
- Location in Turkey
- Coordinates: 37.0678°N 35.9641°E
- Country: Turkey
- Province: Adana
- District: Ceyhan
- Population (2022): 257
- Time zone: UTC+3 (TRT)

Veysiye (formerly: Günyazı) is a neighbourhood in the municipality and district of Ceyhan, Adana Province, Turkey. Its population is 257 (2022).
