= Gündoğan, Ceyhan =

Gündoğan
- Neighbourhood
- Location in Turkey
- Coordinates: 36.8923°N 35.6696°E
- Country: Turkey
- Province: Adana
- District: Ceyhan
- Population (2022): 213
- Time zone: UTC+3 (TRT)

Gündoğan is a neighbourhood in the municipality and district of Ceyhan, Adana Province, Turkey. Its population is 213 (2022).
