= Ekinyazı, Ceyhan =

Ekinyazı
- Neighbourhood
- Location in Turkey
- Coordinates: 37.1693°N 35.8644°E
- Country: Turkey
- Province: Adana
- District: Ceyhan
- Population (2022): 280
- Time zone: UTC+3 (TRT)

Ekinyazı is a neighbourhood in the municipality and district of Ceyhan, Adana Province, Turkey. Its population is 280 (2022).
