= Çokçapınar, Ceyhan =

Çokçapınar
- Neighbourhood
- Location in Turkey
- Coordinates: 36.9833°N 35.7167°E
- Country: Turkey
- Province: Adana
- District: Ceyhan
- Population (2022): 262
- Time zone: UTC+3 (TRT)

Çokçapınar is a neighbourhood in the municipality and district of Ceyhan, Adana Province, Turkey. Its population is 262 (2022).
