= Isırganlı, Ceyhan =

Isırganlı
- Neighbourhood
- Location in Turkey
- Coordinates: 37°06′N 35°40′E
- Country: Turkey
- Province: Adana
- District: Ceyhan
- Population (2022): 295
- Time zone: UTC+3 (TRT)

Isırganlı is a neighbourhood in the municipality and district of Ceyhan, Adana Province, Turkey. Its population is 295 (2022).
