= Gümürdülü, Ceyhan =

Gümürdülü
- Neighbourhood
- Location in Turkey
- Coordinates: 37°13′N 35°40′E
- Country: Turkey
- Province: Adana
- District: Ceyhan
- Population (2022): 1,503
- Time zone: UTC+3 (TRT)

Gümürdülü is a mahalle in the municipality and district of Ceyhan, Adana Province, Turkey. Its population is 1,503 (2022).
