= Soğukpınar, Ceyhan =

Soğukpınar
- Neighbourhood
- Location in Turkey
- Coordinates: 37.0277°N 35.9640°E
- Country: Turkey
- Province: Adana
- District: Ceyhan
- Population (2022): 318
- Time zone: UTC+3 (TRT)

Soğukpınar is a neighbourhood in the municipality and district of Ceyhan, Adana Province, Turkey. Its population is 318 (2022).
