= Toktamış, Ceyhan =

Toktamış
- Neighbourhood
- Location in Turkey
- Coordinates: 37°00′N 35°46′E
- Country: Turkey
- Province: Adana
- District: Ceyhan
- Population (2022): 834
- Time zone: UTC+3 (TRT)

Toktamış is a neighbourhood in the municipality and district of Ceyhan, Adana Province, Turkey. Its population is 834 (2022).
