= Dağıstan, Ceyhan =

Dağıstan
- Neighbourhood
- Location within Turkey
- Coordinates: 37.1029°N 35.9832°E
- Country: Turkey
- Province: Adana
- District: Ceyhan
- Population (2022): 188
- Time zone: UTC+3 (TRT)

Dağıstan is a neighbourhood in the municipality and district of Ceyhan, Adana Province, Turkey. Its population is 188 (2022).
