= Altıkara, Ceyhan =

Altıkara
- Neighbourhood
- Location in Turkey
- Coordinates: 37°0′N 35°43′E
- Country: Turkey
- Province: Adana
- District: Ceyhan
- Population (2022): 69
- Time zone: UTC+3 (TRT)

Altıkara is a neighbourhood in the municipality and district of Ceyhan, Adana Province, Turkey. Its population is 69 (2022). It lies near the northern bank of the Ceyhan River just off European Route 90 (Highway 0-52), 14 kilometres to the southwest of Ceyhan city.
