= Mercimek, Ceyhan =

Mercimek
- Neighbourhood
- Location in Turkey
- Coordinates: 37.1038°N 35.7947°E
- Country: Turkey
- Province: Adana
- District: Ceyhan
- Population (2022): 3,282
- Time zone: UTC+3 (TRT)

Mercimek is a neighbourhood of the municipality and district of Ceyhan, Adana Province, Turkey. Its population is 3,282 (2022). Before the 2013 reorganisation, it was a town (belde).
