= Tatarlı, Ceyhan =

Tatarlı
- Neighbourhood
- Location in Turkey
- Coordinates: 37°07′26″N 36°03′18″E
- Country: Turkey
- Province: Adana
- District: Ceyhan
- Population (2022): 541
- Time zone: UTC+3 (TRT)

Tatarlı is a neighbourhood in the municipality and district of Ceyhan, Adana Province, Turkey. Its population is 541 (2022).
