= Tatlıkuyu, Ceyhan =

Tatlıkuyu
- Neighbourhood
- Location in Turkey
- Coordinates: 37.1188°N 35.7110°E
- Country: Turkey
- Province: Adana
- District: Ceyhan
- Population (2022): 290
- Time zone: UTC+3 (TRT)

Tatlıkuyu is a neighbourhood in the municipality and district of Ceyhan, Adana Province, Turkey. Its population is 290 (2022).
