= Nazımbey Yeniköy, Ceyhan =

Nazımbey Yeniköy
- Neighbourhood
- Location in Turkey
- Coordinates: 36°57′N 35°46′E
- Country: Turkey
- Province: Adana
- District: Ceyhan
- Population (2022): 223
- Time zone: UTC+3 (TRT)

Nazımbey Yeniköy is a neighbourhood in the municipality and district of Ceyhan, Adana Province, Turkey. Its population is 223 (2022).
