= Küçükburhaniye, Ceyhan =

Küçükburhaniye
- Neighbourhood
- Location in Turkey
- Coordinates: 37°0′33″N 35°44′28″E
- Country: Turkey
- Province: Adana
- District: Ceyhan
- Population (2022): 97
- Time zone: UTC+3 (TRT)

Küçükburhaniye is a neighbourhood in the municipality and district of Ceyhan, Adana Province, Turkey. Its population is 97 (2022).
