= Mercin, Ceyhan =

Mercin
- Neighbourhood
- Location in Turkey
- Coordinates: 37°05′N 35°52′E
- Country: Turkey
- Province: Adana
- District: Ceyhan
- Population (2022): 294
- Time zone: UTC+3 (TRT)

Mercin (formerly: İncetarla) is a neighbourhood in the municipality and district of Ceyhan, Adana Province, Turkey. Its population is 294 (2022).
