= Kösreli, Ceyhan =

Kösreli
- Neighbourhood
- Location in Turkey
- Coordinates: 37.1625°N 35.9783°E
- Country: Turkey
- Province: Adana
- District: Ceyhan
- Population (2022): 1,016
- Time zone: UTC+3 (TRT)

Kösreli is a neighbourhood of the municipality and district of Ceyhan, Adana Province, Turkey. Its population is 1,016 (2022). Before the 2013 reorganisation, it was a town (belde).
