= Erenler, Ceyhan =

Erenler
- Neighbourhood
- Location in Turkey
- Coordinates: 37.0080°N 35.9267°E
- Country: Turkey
- Province: Adana
- District: Ceyhan
- Population (2022): 249
- Time zone: UTC+3 (TRT)

Erenler is a neighbourhood in the municipality and district of Ceyhan, Adana Province, Turkey. Its population is 249 (2022).
