= Çatalhüyük, Ceyhan =

Village in Adana Province, Turkey

Çatalhüyük
- Neighbourhood
- Location in Turkey
- Coordinates: 37.1972°N 35.8169°E
- Country: Turkey
- Province: Adana
- District: Ceyhan
- Population (2022): 185
- Time zone: UTC+3 (TRT)

Çatalhüyük is a neighbourhood in the municipality and district of Ceyhan, Adana Province, Turkey. Its population is 185 (2022).
