= Akdam, Ceyhan =

Akdam
- Neighbourhood
- Location in Turkey
- Coordinates: 37.2361°N 35.8609°E
- Country: Turkey
- Province: Adana
- District: Ceyhan
- Population (2022): 398
- Time zone: UTC+3 (TRT)

Akdam is a neighbourhood in the municipality and district of Ceyhan, Adana Province, Turkey. Its population is 398 (2022).
