= Hamitbey, Ceyhan =

Hamitbey
- Neighbourhood
- Location in Turkey
- Coordinates: 37°07′N 35°50′E
- Country: Turkey
- Province: Adana
- District: Ceyhan
- Population (2022): 112
- Time zone: UTC+3 (TRT)

Hamitbey is a neighbourhood in the municipality and district of Ceyhan, Adana Province, Turkey. Its population is 112 (2022).
