= Elmagölü, Ceyhan =

Elmagölü
- Neighbourhood
- Location in Turkey
- Coordinates: 37°10′N 35°54′E
- Country: Turkey
- Province: Adana
- District: Ceyhan
- Population (2022): 303
- Time zone: UTC+3 (TRT)

Elmagölü is a neighbourhood in the municipality and district of Ceyhan, Adana Province, Turkey. Its population is 303 (2022).
