= Azizli, Ceyhan =

Azizli
- Neighbourhood
- Location in Turkey
- Coordinates: 37.06145°N 36.02545°E
- Country: Turkey
- Province: Adana
- District: Ceyhan
- Population (2022): 278
- Time zone: UTC+3 (TRT)

Azizli is a neighbourhood in the municipality and district of Ceyhan, Adana Province, Turkey. Its population is 278 (2022).
