= İmran, Ceyhan =

İmran
- Neighbourhood
- Location in Turkey
- Coordinates: 37.03819°N 35.97370°E
- Country: Turkey
- Province: Adana
- District: Ceyhan
- Population (2022): 333
- Time zone: UTC+3 (TRT)

İmran is a neighbourhood in the municipality and district of Ceyhan, Adana Province, Turkey. Its population is 333 (2022).
