= Mansurlu, Feke =

Mansurlu
- Neighbourhood
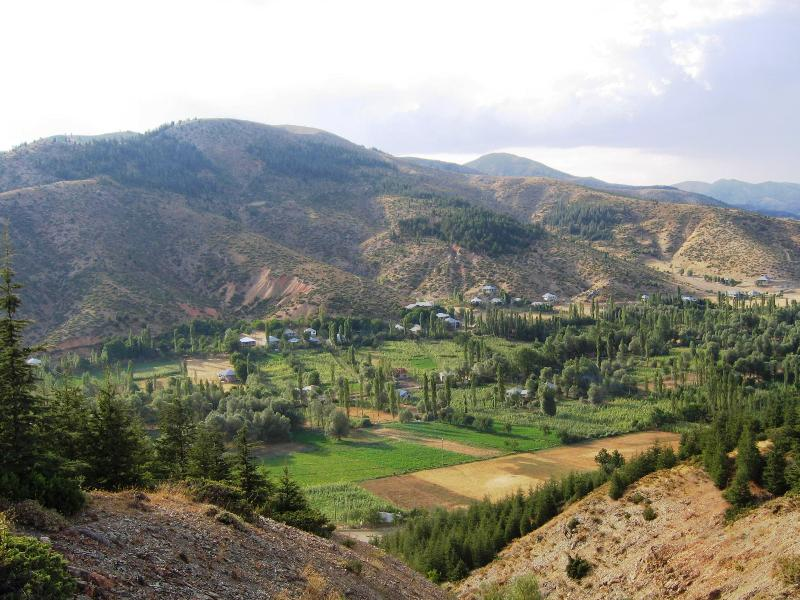

- Location within Turkey
- Coordinates: 37°52′22″N 35°37′37″E
- Country: Turkey
- Province: Adana
- District: Feke
- Population (2022): 337
- Time zone: UTC+3 (TRT)

Mansurlu is a neighbourhood in the municipality and district of Feke, Adana Province, Turkey. Its population is 337 (2022). The village was inhabited by Turkmens of the Varsak tribe.
