= Çiçekli, Ceyhan =

Çiçekli
- Neighbourhood
- Location in Turkey
- Coordinates: 37.0838°N 35.6941°E
- Country: Turkey
- Province: Adana
- District: Ceyhan
- Population (2022): 92
- Time zone: UTC+3 (TRT)

Çiçekli is a neighbourhood in the municipality and district of Ceyhan, Adana Province, Turkey. Its population is 92 (2022).
