= Camuzağılı, Ceyhan =

Camuzağılı
- Neighbourhood
- Location in Turkey
- Coordinates: 37°15′N 35°48′E
- Country: Turkey
- Province: Adana
- District: Ceyhan
- Population (2022): 403
- Time zone: UTC+3 (TRT)
- Postal code: 01920
- Area code: 0322

Camuzağılı is a neighbourhood in the municipality and district of Ceyhan, Adana Province, Turkey. Its population is 403 (2022).
