= Hamidiye, Ceyhan =

Hamidiye
- Neighbourhood
- Location in Turkey
- Coordinates: 37.0247°N 35.8175°E
- Country: Turkey
- Province: Adana
- District: Ceyhan
- Population (2022): 69
- Time zone: UTC+3 (TRT)

Hamidiye is a neighbourhood in the municipality and district of Ceyhan, Adana Province, Turkey. Its population is 69 (2022).
