= Çevretepe, Ceyhan =

Çevretepe
- Neighbourhood
- Location in Turkey
- Coordinates: 36°54′N 35°49′E
- Country: Turkey
- Province: Adana
- District: Ceyhan
- Population (2022): 284
- Time zone: UTC+3 (TRT)

Çevretepe is an Albanian speaking neighbourhood in the municipality and district of Ceyhan, Adana Province, Turkey. Its population is 284 (2022).
