= Durhasandede, Ceyhan =

Durhasandede
- Neighbourhood
- Location in Turkey
- Coordinates: 36°53′N 35°44′E
- Country: Turkey
- Province: Adana
- District: Ceyhan
- Population (2022): 85
- Time zone: UTC+3 (TRT)

Durhasandede is a neighbourhood in the municipality and district of Ceyhan, Adana Province, Turkey. Its population is 85 (2022). The village is inhabited by Tahtacı.
