= Ağaçlı, Ceyhan =

Ağaçlı
- Neighbourhood
- Location in Turkey
- Coordinates: 37°13′55″N 35°53′31″E
- Country: Turkey
- Province: Adana
- District: Ceyhan
- Population (2022): 85
- Time zone: UTC+3 (TRT)

Ağaçlı is a neighbourhood in the municipality and district of Ceyhan, Adana Province, Turkey. Its population is 85 (2022).
