= Dokuztekne, Ceyhan =

Dokuztekne
- Neighbourhood
- Location in Turkey
- Coordinates: 37°01′N 35°59′E
- Country: Turkey
- Province: Adana
- District: Ceyhan
- Population (2022): 952
- Time zone: UTC+3 (TRT)

Dokuztekne is a neighbourhood in the municipality and district of Ceyhan, Adana Province, Turkey. Its population is 952 (2022).
