= Aydınlar, Ceyhan =

Aydınlar
- Neighbourhood
- Location in Turkey
- Coordinates: 36°59′N 35°55′E
- Country: Turkey
- Province: Adana
- District: Ceyhan
- Population (2022): 220
- Time zone: UTC+3 (TRT)

Aydınlar (formerly: Sarıkeçili) is a neighbourhood in the municipality and district of Ceyhan, Adana Province, Turkey. Its population is 220 (2022).
