= Körkuyu, Ceyhan =

Körkuyu
- Neighbourhood
- Location in Turkey
- Coordinates: 36.9480°N 35.8235°E
- Country: Turkey
- Province: Adana
- District: Ceyhan
- Population (2022): 526
- Time zone: UTC+3 (TRT)

Körkuyu is a neighbourhood in the municipality and district of Ceyhan, Adana Province, Turkey. Its population is 526 (2022).
