= Yalak, Ceyhan =

Yalak
- Neighbourhood
- Location in Turkey
- Coordinates: 37.1109°N 35.9303°E
- Country: Turkey
- Province: Adana
- District: Ceyhan
- Population (2022): 236
- Time zone: UTC+3 (TRT)

Yalak is a neighbourhood in the municipality and district of Ceyhan, Adana Province, Turkey. It population is 236 (2022).
