= Dikilitaş, Ceyhan =

Dikilitaş
- Neighbourhood
- Location in Turkey
- Coordinates: 37°11′08″N 35°54′53″E
- Country: Turkey
- Province: Adana
- District: Ceyhan
- Population (2022): 105
- Time zone: UTC+3 (TRT)

Dikilitaş is a neighbourhood in the municipality and district of Ceyhan, Adana Province, Turkey. Its population is 105 (2022).
