= Büyükmangıt, Ceyhan =

Büyükmangıt
- Neighbourhood
- Location in Turkey
- Coordinates: 37°02′N 35°46′E
- Country: Turkey
- Province: Adana
- District: Ceyhan
- Population (2022): 3,678
- Time zone: UTC+3 (TRT)

Büyükmangıt is a neighbourhood of the municipality and district of Ceyhan, Adana Province, Turkey. Its population is 3,678 (2022). Before the 2013 reorganisation, it was a town (belde).
