= İsalı, Ceyhan =

İsalı
- Neighbourhood
- Location in Turkey
- Coordinates: 36.9205°N 35.7195°E
- Country: Turkey
- Province: Adana
- District: Ceyhan
- Population (2022): 374
- Time zone: UTC+3 (TRT)

İsalı is a neighbourhood in the municipality and district of Ceyhan, Adana Province, Turkey. Its population is 374 (2022).
