= Kıvrıklı, Ceyhan =

Kıvrıklı
- Neighbourhood
- Location in Turkey
- Coordinates: 37°05′N 35°43′E
- Country: Turkey
- Province: Adana
- District: Ceyhan
- Population (2022): 654
- Time zone: UTC+3 (TRT)

Kıvrıklı is a neighbourhood in the municipality and district of Ceyhan, Adana Province, Turkey. Its population is 654 (2022).
