= Dutlupınar, Ceyhan =

Dutlupınar
- Neighbourhood
- Location in Turkey
- Coordinates: 37°02′N 36°01′E
- Country: Turkey
- Province: Adana
- District: Ceyhan
- Population (2022): 515
- Time zone: UTC+3 (TRT)

Dutlupınar is a neighbourhood in the municipality and district of Ceyhan, Adana Province, Turkey. Its population is 515 (2022).
