= İnceyer, Ceyhan =

İnceyer
- Neighbourhood
- Location in Turkey
- Coordinates: 37°11′N 35°52′E
- Country: Turkey
- Province: Adana
- District: Ceyhan
- Population (2022): 123
- Time zone: UTC+3 (TRT)

İnceyer is a neighbourhood in the municipality and district of Ceyhan, Adana Province, Turkey. Its population is 123 (2022).
