= Selimiye, Ceyhan =

Selimiye
- Neighbourhood
- Location in Turkey
- Coordinates: 36.9957°N 35.9620°E
- Country: Turkey
- Province: Adana
- District: Ceyhan
- Population (2022): 137
- Time zone: UTC+3 (TRT)

Selimiye is a neighbourhood in the municipality and district of Ceyhan, Adana Province, Turkey. Its population is 137 (2022).
