= Ağaçpınar, Ceyhan =

Ağaçpınar
- Neighbourhood
- Location in Turkey
- Coordinates: 36.97054°N 35.73386°E
- Country: Turkey
- Province: Adana
- District: Ceyhan
- Population (2022): 219
- Time zone: UTC+3 (TRT)

Ağaçpınar is a neighbourhood in the municipality and district of Ceyhan, Adana Province, Turkey. Its population is 219 (2022).
