= Adapınar, Ceyhan =

Adapınar
- Neighbourhood
- Location in Turkey
- Coordinates: 37°08′N 35°51′E
- Country: Turkey
- Province: Adana
- District: Ceyhan
- Population (2022): 201
- Time zone: UTC+3 (TRT)

Adapınar is a neighbourhood in the municipality and district of Ceyhan, Adana Province, Turkey. Its population is 201 (2022).
