= Başören, Ceyhan =

Başören
- Neighbourhood
- Location in Turkey
- Coordinates: 37.1560°N 35.5991°E
- Country: Turkey
- Province: Adana
- District: Ceyhan
- Population (2022): 1,430
- Time zone: UTC+3 (TRT)

Başören is a neighbourhood in the municipality and district of Ceyhan, Adana Province, Turkey. Its population is 1,430 (2022).
