= Kurtkulağı Caravanserai =

Caravanserai in Adana Province, Turkey

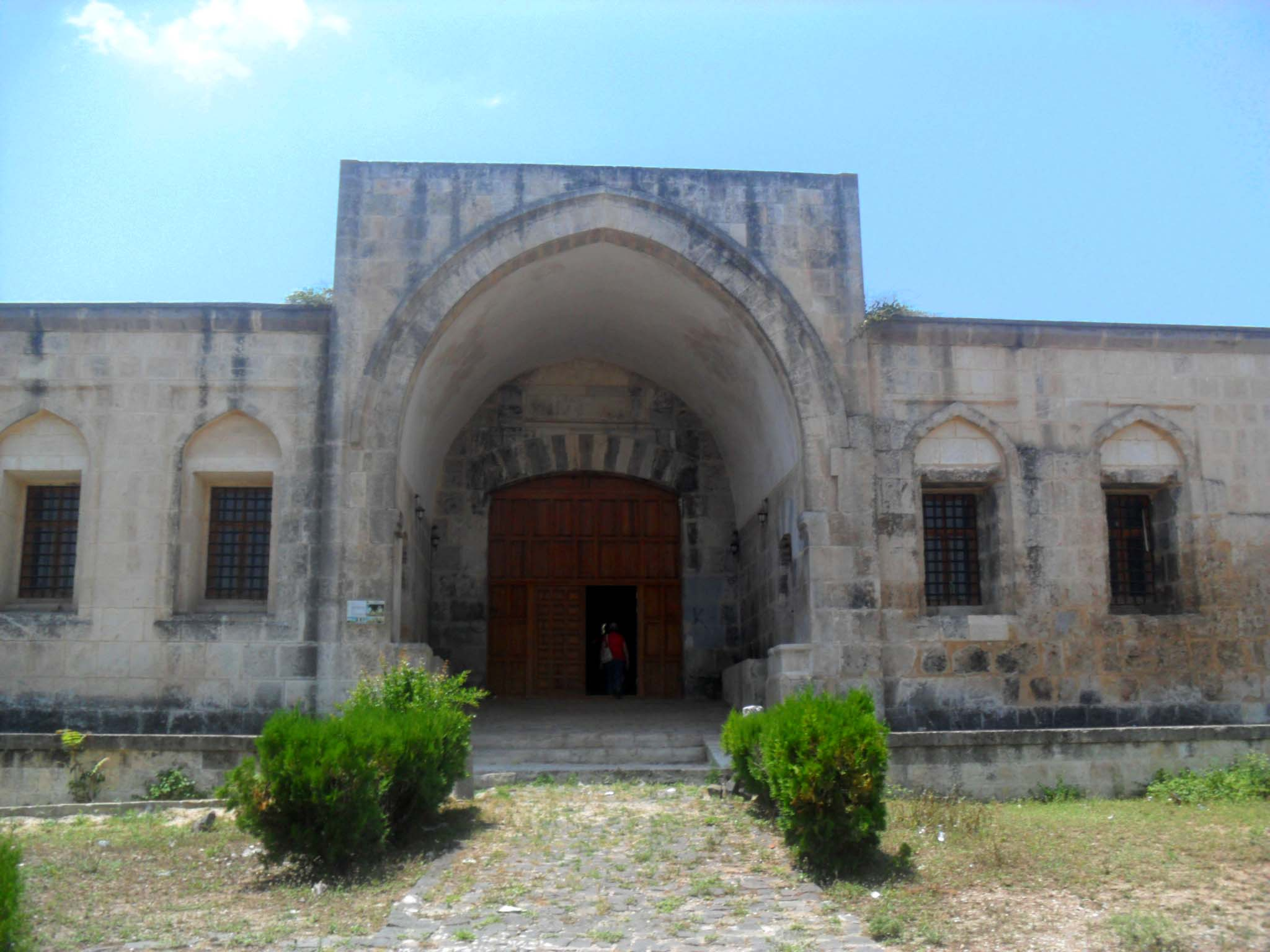

Kurtkulağı Kervansarayı is a historical (Ottoman) caravanserai in Adana Province, Turkey

== Geography ==
The caravanserai is in the Kurtkulağı village of Ceyhan ilçe (district) which is a part of Adana Province. It is situated to the south of Ceyhan at 36°55′24″N 35°53′07″E. Its distance to Ceyhan is 14 kilometres (8.7 mi) and to Adana is 65 kilometres (40 mi) . The name of the village and the caravanserai refer to the flower Syngonium

== History ==
The history of the notable Ottoman buildings can be traced by the vakfiye ( inscription of endowment) on the walls of the building. But during the French occupation (1919–1922) following World War I, the vakfiye in Kurtkulağı caravanserai had been dismounted. Thus the construction year is not certain. According to some sources the building had been commissioned by Hüseyin Pasha in 1659. Some sources give 1693 as the construction date. But it is certainly not later than 1704; because it was mentioned in a firman by the sultan Ahmet III in 1704. The architect was Mehmet Aga. On 10 June 1712 the caravanserai was restored and a guard team of 50 soldiers were appointed to the caravanserai.

== The building ==
The caravanserai was constructed on the former trade road between Adana and Aleppo. It is an example of a type known as "caravansearai without a courtyard". It is a rectangular building with 45,75 X 23,60 m dimensions (or 150 x 77 ft) The entrance is via east. The vaults are tunnel vault type.
