= Narlık, Ceyhan =

Narlık
- Neighbourhood
- Location in Turkey
- Coordinates: 36.9145°N 35.8518°E
- Country: Turkey
- Province: Adana
- District: Ceyhan
- Population (2022): 351
- Time zone: UTC+3 (TRT)

Narlık is a neighbourhood in the municipality and district of Ceyhan, Adana Province, Turkey. Its population is 351 (2022).
