= Köprülü, Ceyhan =

Köprülü
- Neighbourhood
- Location in Turkey
- Coordinates: 37.0958°N 35.9241°E
- Country: Turkey
- Province: Adana
- District: Ceyhan
- Population (2022): 166
- Time zone: UTC+3 (TRT)

Köprülü is a neighbourhood in the municipality and district of Ceyhan, Adana Province, Turkey. Its population is 166 (2022).
