= Yellibel, Ceyhan =

Yellibel
- Neighbourhood
- Location in Turkey
- Coordinates: 36°52′N 35°44′E
- Country: Turkey
- Province: Adana
- District: Ceyhan
- Population (2022): 158
- Time zone: UTC+3 (TRT)

Yellibel is a neighbourhood in the municipality and district of Ceyhan, Adana Province, Turkey. Its population is 158 (2022).
