= Değirmendere, Ceyhan =

Değirmendere
- Neighbourhood
- Location in Turkey
- Coordinates: 37.0043°N 35.9123°E
- Country: Turkey
- Province: Adana
- District: Ceyhan
- Population (2022): 317
- Time zone: UTC+3 (TRT)

Değirmendere is a neighbourhood in the municipality and district of Ceyhan, Adana Province, Turkey. Its population is 317 (2022).
