= Tumlu, Ceyhan =

Tumlu
- Neighbourhood
- Location in Turkey
- Coordinates: 37.1501°N 35.7072°E
- Country: Turkey
- Province: Adana
- District: Ceyhan
- Population (2022): 453
- Time zone: UTC+3 (TRT)

Tumlu (formerly: Dumlu) is a neighbourhood in the municipality and district of Ceyhan, Adana Province, Turkey. Its population is 453 (2022). Above the village is a magnificent fortification dating from the period of the Armenian Kingdom of Cilicia. This well-preserved site displays horseshoe-shaped towers, a complex entrance, numerous vaulted undercrofts, and cisterns. This site was the subject of a University of California archaeological survey in 1974 and 1979. Neither these surveys nor the one conducted earlier by G. R. Youngs could find any evidence of Crusader construction or occupation.

== See also ==
- List of Crusader castles
