= Çiftlikler, Ceyhan =

Çiftlikler
- Neighbourhood
- Location in Turkey
- Coordinates: 36.9865°N 35.8782°E
- Country: Turkey
- Province: Adana
- District: Ceyhan
- Population (2022): 348
- Time zone: UTC+3 (TRT)

Çiftlikler is a neighbourhood in the municipality and district of Ceyhan, Adana Province, Turkey. Its population is 348 (2022).
