= Yılankale, Ceyhan =

Yılankale
- Neighbourhood
- Country: Turkey
- Province: Adana
- District: Ceyhan
- Population (2022): 234
- Time zone: UTC+3 (TRT)

Yılankale is a neighbourhood in the municipality and district of Ceyhan, Adana Province, Turkey. Its population is 234 (2022).
