= Kuzucak, Ceyhan =

Kuzucak
- Neighbourhood
- Location in Turkey
- Coordinates: 37.0567°N 35.9972°E
- Country: Turkey
- Province: Adana
- District: Ceyhan
- Population (2022): 402
- Time zone: UTC+3 (TRT)

Kuzucak is a neighbourhood in the municipality and district of Ceyhan, Adana Province, Turkey. Its population is 402 (2022).
