= Mustafabeyli, Adana =

Mustafabeyli
- Neighbourhood
- Location in Turkey
- Coordinates: 37°05′N 36°04′E
- Country: Turkey
- Province: Adana
- District: Ceyhan
- Elevation: 40 m (130 ft)
- Population (2022): 1,507
- Time zone: UTC+3 (TRT)
- Area code: 0322

Mustafabeyli is a neighbourhood of the municipality and district of Ceyhan, Adana Province, Turkey. Its population is 1,507 (2022). Before the 2013 reorganisation, it was a town (belde). It is on the highway D.400 near the intersection with D.817. The distance to Ceyhan is 27 kilometres (17 mi).
