= Kızıldere, Ceyhan =

Kızıldere
- Neighbourhood
- Location in Turkey
- Coordinates: 36.9462°N 35.6820°E
- Country: Turkey
- Province: Adana
- District: Ceyhan
- Population (2022): 578
- Time zone: UTC+3 (TRT)

Kızıldere is a neighbourhood in the municipality and district of Ceyhan, Adana Province, Turkey. Its population is 578 (2022).
