= Çelemli =

Settlement in Turkey

- Neighbourhood
- Location within Turkey
- Coordinates: 36°51′N 35°39′E
- Country: Turkey
- Province: Adana
- District: Yüreğir
- Elevation: 185 m (607 ft)
- Population (2022): 1,113
- Time zone: UTC+3 (TRT)
- Postal code: 01350
- Area code: 0322

Çelemli is a neighbourhood of the municipality and district of Yüreğir, Adana Province, Turkey. Its population is 1,113 (2022). Before the 2013 reorganisation, it was a town (belde).

== Geography ==
Situated east of the Ceyhan River, Çelemli is 10 kilometres (6.2 mi) inland from the Mediterranean Sea. Highway distance to Adana is 45 kilometres (28 mi) and to the historical city of Misis (Mopsuestia) is 20 kilometres (12 mi). It is situated on a low valley with an altitude of about 170 metres (560 ft). On the summit of the nearest hill there are telecommunication facilities like microwave links, TV transmitter stations, etc.

== History ==
After Ottoman conquest of Balkan Peninsula in the 14th century, Oghuz Turks in Anatolia had been transferred to Balkans, where they lived up to the second half of the 19th century. However, after the disastrous Russo-Turkish War (1877–1878) most of them had to return where they were settled in various locations in Anatolia. Çelemli residents are a part of those immigrants.

== Economy ==
The most important economic activity is cattle dealing and dairying. Wheat, canola, watermelon, sunflower and cabbage are among the more important crops. In fact the name of the town Çelemli is a distorted form of the word kelem the popular name of cabbage among the Turks of Balkan.
