= Irmaklı, Ceyhan =

Irmaklı
- Neighbourhood
- Country: Turkey
- Province: Adana
- District: Ceyhan
- Population (2022): 148
- Time zone: UTC+3 (TRT)

Irmaklı is a neighbourhood in the municipality and district of Ceyhan, Adana Province, Turkey. Its population is 148 (2022).
