= Sarıçam, Yüreğir =

Sarıçam
- Neighbourhood
- Location in Turkey
- Coordinates: 36.9938°N 35.3546°E
- Country: Turkey
- Province: Adana
- District: Yüreğir
- Population (2022): 8,362
- Time zone: UTC+3 (TRT)

Sarıçam is a neighbourhood in the municipality and district of Yüreğir, Adana Province, Turkey. Its population is 8,362 (2022).
