= Çakaldere, Ceyhan =

Çakaldere
- Neighbourhood
- Location in Turkey
- Coordinates: 37°00′N 35°41′E
- Country: Turkey
- Province: Adana
- District: Ceyhan
- Population (2022): 323
- Time zone: UTC+3 (TRT)

Çakaldere is a neighbourhood in the municipality and district of Ceyhan, Adana Province, Turkey. Its population is 323 (2022).
