= Yeşilbahçe, Ceyhan =

Yeşilbahçe
- Neighbourhood
- Location in Turkey
- Coordinates: 37.1617°N 35.8079°E
- Country: Turkey
- Province: Adana
- District: Ceyhan
- Population (2022): 545
- Time zone: UTC+3 (TRT)

Yeşilbahçe is a neighbourhood in the municipality and district of Ceyhan, Adana Province, Turkey. Its population is 545 (2022).
