= Burhanlı, Ceyhan =

Burhanlı
- Neighbourhood
- Location in Turkey
- Coordinates: 37.1555°N 36.0665°E
- Country: Turkey
- Province: Adana
- District: Ceyhan
- Population (2022): 279
- Time zone: UTC+3 (TRT)

Burhanlı is a neighbourhood in the municipality and district of Ceyhan, Adana Province, Turkey. Its population is 279 (2022).
