= Sağırlar, Ceyhan =

Sağırlar
- Neighbourhood
- Location in Turkey
- Coordinates: 36.9749°N 35.9271°E
- Country: Turkey
- Province: Adana
- District: Ceyhan
- Population (2022): 134
- Time zone: UTC+3 (TRT)

Sağırlar is a neighbourhood in the municipality and district of Ceyhan, Adana Province, Turkey. Its population is 134 (2022).
