= Ceyhan =

- District and municipality
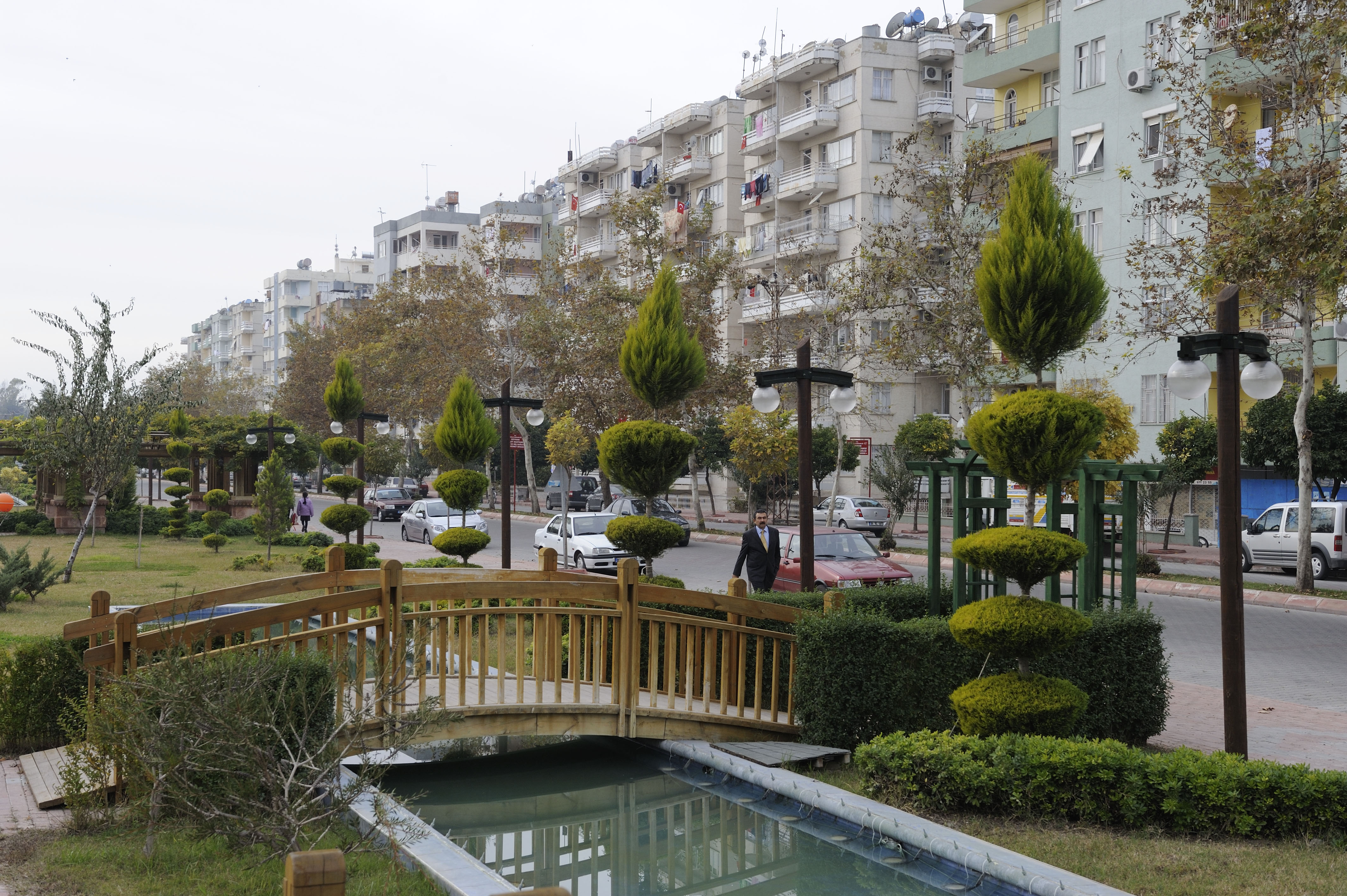

- Logo

- Map showing Ceyhan District in Adana Province

- Location within Turkey
- Coordinates: 37°01′44″N 35°48′45″E
- Country: Turkey
- Province: Adana

Government
  - Mayor: Sevil Aydar Yıldız (acting) (CHP)
- Area: 1,426 km^{2} (551 sq mi)
- Population (2022): 158,922
  - Density: 111.4/km^{2} (288.6/sq mi)
- Time zone: UTC+3 (TRT)
- Postal code: 01960
- Area code: 0322
- Website: www.ceyhan.bel.tr

Ceyhan (pronounced [ˈdʒejhan]) is a municipality and district of Adana Province, Turkey. Its area is 1,426 km^{2}, and its population is 158,922 (2022). It is the most populous district of the province, outside the city of Adana. Ceyhan is the transportation hub for Middle Eastern and Central Asian oil and natural gas. The city is situated on the Ceyhan River that flows through the Çukurova plain. The Ceyhan River is dammed at Aslantas to provide flood control and irrigation for the lower river basin around Ceyhan.

== Climate ==
Ceyhan has a Mediterranean climate (Köppen: Csa) with very hot, muggy summers with low precipitation, and mild, rainy winters.

Climate data for Ceyhan (1991–2020)
Month	Jan	Feb	Mar	Apr	May	Jun	Jul	Aug	Sep	Oct	Nov	Dec	Year
Mean daily maximum °C (°F)	14.2 (57.6)	15.9 (60.6)	19.3 (66.7)	23.5 (74.3)	28.1 (82.6)	31.8 (89.2)	34.0 (93.2)	34.5 (94.1)	32.7 (90.9)	29.1 (84.4)	21.9 (71.4)	15.9 (60.6)	25.1 (77.2)
Daily mean °C (°F)	8.3 (46.9)	9.5 (49.1)	12.8 (55.0)	16.7 (62.1)	21.2 (70.2)	25.2 (77.4)	28.0 (82.4)	28.3 (82.9)	25.5 (77.9)	21.1 (70.0)	14.3 (57.7)	9.7 (49.5)	18.4 (65.1)
Mean daily minimum °C (°F)	3.7 (38.7)	4.4 (39.9)	7.2 (45.0)	10.7 (51.3)	14.9 (58.8)	19.0 (66.2)	22.5 (72.5)	22.9 (73.2)	19.2 (66.6)	14.5 (58.1)	8.3 (46.9)	5.1 (41.2)	12.7 (54.9)
Average precipitation mm (inches)	103.17 (4.06)	101.96 (4.01)	83.48 (3.29)	65.46 (2.58)	51.27 (2.02)	22.46 (0.88)	8.41 (0.33)	4.19 (0.16)	26.81 (1.06)	42.2 (1.66)	78.64 (3.10)	133.84 (5.27)	721.89 (28.42)
Average precipitation days (≥ 1.0 mm)	7.6	7.6	7.9	6.5	5.1	2.7	2.1	1.1	3.2	4.6	5.3	8.5	62.2
Average relative humidity (%)	67.3	65.5	65.1	65.8	64.1	63.5	66.2	67.0	63.0	59.2	60.3	68.7	64.6
Source: NOAA

== Economy ==
Ceyhan's marine transport terminal at the Port of Ceyhan is the Mediterranean terminus of the Baku–Tbilisi–Ceyhan pipeline (the "BTC") which brings crude oil from the landlocked Caspian Sea across Azerbaijan and Georgia, entering Turkey in the northeast. The pipeline was completed in May 2005. The terminal contains seven storage tanks, a jetty capable of loading two tankers of up to 300,000 tonnes deadweight (DWT) simultaneously, metering facilities, a waste water treatment plant and vapor incineration ("burn-off") facilities.

Ceyhan Port is also the destination of Kirkuk–Ceyhan Oil Pipeline. This pipeline was closed in 2024 due to a payment dispute but resumed operations on 27 September 2025 after an interim agreement was reached between Iraq's federal oil ministry, the natural resources ministry of the Kurdistan Region, and international oil companies operating in the region.

== Transport ==
Adana Şakirpaşa Airport is the closest airport to Ceyhan 60 km (37 mi) west of the city. There are domestic and international flights to numerous destinations from the airport. There was a plane crash here in 1999. A Saudi bound plane carrying Hajj pilgrims crashed a few minutes after takeoff. There were many deaths.

Ceyhan railway station was opened in 1912 as part of the Berlin–Baghdad railway. The station is currently served by two regional lines and one long-distance line. Regional lines run from Mersin to İskenderun and Mersin to İslahiye; long-distance line runs from Adana to Elazığ. There are three services daily to Adana Central Station to connect to the western destinations; Mersin, Ankara, Karaman and Kayseri.

== Places of interest ==
- The Caravanserai of Kurtkulağı - built in 1659 by Hüseyin Paşa, architect Mehmed Ağa.
- Tumlu Kale or Dumlukale - another castle.
- Sirkeli Höyük - built to commemorate a battle here between Hittite emperor Muvattali and the Egyptian pharaoh Rameses.

== Composition ==
There are 112 neighbourhoods in Ceyhan District:

- Adapınar
- Adatepe
- Ağaçlı
- Ağaçpınar
- Akdam
- Altıgözbekirli
- Altıkara
- Altıocak
- Atatürk
- Aydınlar
- Aytemuroğlu
- Azizli
- Başören
- Belediye Evleri
- Birkent
- Bota
- Burhaniye
- Burhanlı
- Büyükburhaniye
- Büyükkırım
- Büyükmangıt
- Çakaldere
- Camuzağılı
- Çataklı
- Çatalhüyük
- Çevretepe
- Ceyhanbekirli
- Çiçekli
- Çiftlikler
- Civantayak
- Çokçapınar
- Cumhuriyet
- Dağıstan
- Değirmendere
- Değirmenli
- Dikilitaş
- Dokuztekne
- Doruk
- Durhasandede
- Dutlupınar
- Ekinyazı
- Elmagölü
- Emek
- Erenler
- Esentepe
- Fatih Sultan Mehmet
- Gazi Osman Paşa
- Gümürdülü
- Gündoğan
- Günlüce
- Hamdilli
- Hamidiye
- Hamitbey
- Hamitbeybucağı
- Hürriyet
- İmran
- İnceyer
- İnönü
- Irmaklı
- İsalı
- Isırganlı
- İstiklal
- Karakayalı
- Kelemeti
- Kılıçkaya
- Kıvrıklı
- Kızıldere
- Konakoğlu
- Köprülü
- Körkuyu
- Koruklu
- Kösreli
- Küçükburhaniye
- Küçükkırım
- Küçükmangıt
- Kurtkulağı
- Kurtpınar
- Kuzucak
- Mercimek
- Mercin
- Mithatpaşa
- Modernevler
- Muradiye
- Mustafabeyli
- Namık Kemal
- Narlık
- Nazımbey Yeniköy
- Sağırlar
- Sağkaya
- Şahin Özbilen
- Sarıbahçe
- Sarımazı
- Sarısakal
- Şehit Hacı Ibrahim
- Selimiye
- Sirkeli
- Soğukpınar
- Soysallı
- Tatarlı
- Tatlıkuyu
- Toktamış
- Tumlu
- Üçdutyeşilova
- Ulus
- Veysiye
- Yalak
- Yarsuat
- Yellibel
- Yeşilbahçe
- Yeşildam
- Yılankale
- Zübeyde Hanım

== International relations ==
Ceyhan is twinned with:

- Sumgait, Azerbaijan

== See also ==
- Çukurova
- Cilicia War
- Timeline of the Turkish War of Independence
- Kirkuk–Ceyhan Oil Pipeline
