= Adana Province =

Province of Turkey

Coordinates: 37°22′06″N 35°42′22″E

Adana Province Adana ili
- Province and metropolitan municipality
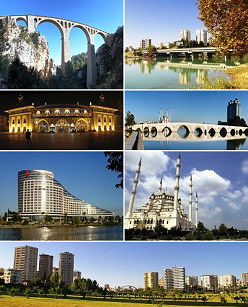

- Location of the province within Turkey
- Country: Turkey
- Seat: Adana

Government
  - Mayor: Güngör Geçer (CHP)
  - Vali: Mustafa Yavuz
- Area: 13,844 km^{2} (5,345 sq mi)
- Population (2022): 2,274,106
  - Density: 164.27/km^{2} (425.45/sq mi)
- Time zone: UTC+3 (TRT)
- Area code: 0322
- Website: www.adana.bel.tr www.adana.gov.tr

Adana Province (Turkish: Adana ili) is a province and metropolitan municipality of Turkey located in central Cilicia. The administrative seat of the province is the city of Adana, home to 78.25% of the residents of the province. Its area is 13,844 km^{2}, and its population is 2,274,106 (2022). It is also closely associated with other Cilician provinces of Mersin, Osmaniye, and (northern) Hatay.

== Geography ==
Köppen map of Adana Province and surrounding regions:
- BSk
- Csa
- Csb
- Dsa
- Dsb
- Dsc
- ET

The southern and central portion of the province mostly falls within the Çukurova Plain (historically known as the Cilician Plain); to the north, the plains give way to the Taurus Mountains (Turkish: Toros Dağları). The provinces adjacent to it are Mersin to the west, Hatay to the southeast, Osmaniye to the east, Kahramanmaraş to the northeast, Kayseri to the north, and Niğde to the northwest.

== Governance ==
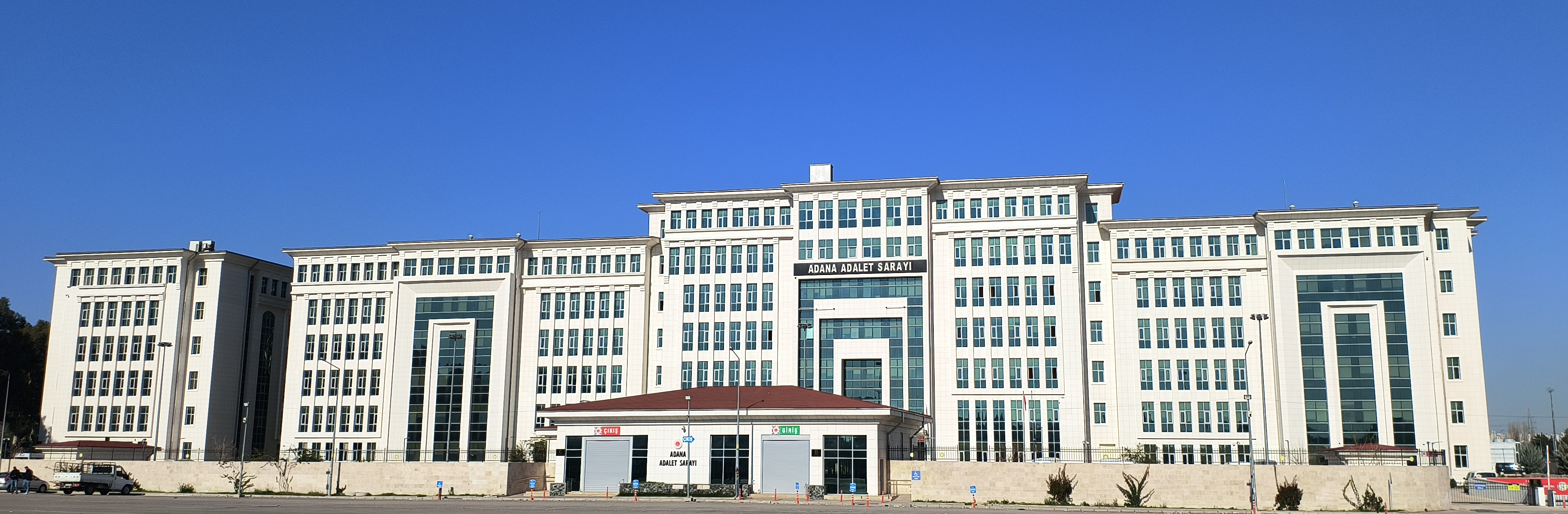
Adana Court of Justice

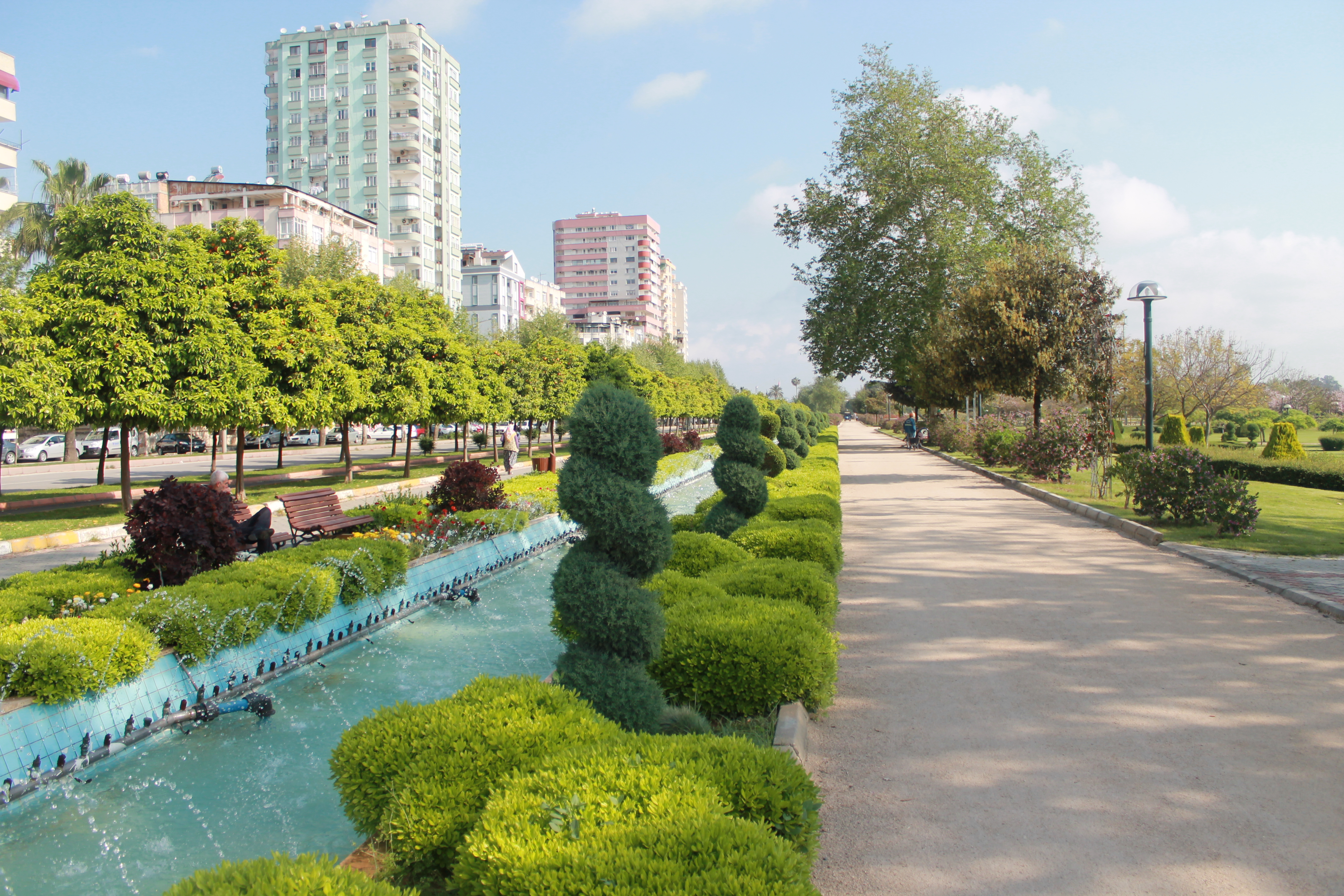
Seyhan district in Adana

Two levels of government are involved in the administration of the Adana Province: the central and the provincial. Adana Governorship is the provincial branch of the central government and Adana Province Special Administration is the provincial governing body. The province is divided into 15 districts, and each district is divided into neighbourhoods (Turkish: Mahalle).

=== Adana governorship ===
The central government in Ankara has the majority of the power in the administration of the province through Adana Governorship. The governorship oversees the functioning of provincial and regional directorates of the ministries and other governmental agencies. Provincial directorates cover Adana Province only, whereas regional directorates cover Çukurova and in some cases additional provinces. Provincial and regional directorates of the Central Government include, but are not limited to;

- Provincial directorates: Education, Healthcare, Tourism and Culture, Youth and Sports, Environment and Forestry, Social Services, Agriculture, Industry and Trade, Police Services, Defense, Population and Citizenship, Employment Agency, Social Security Institution.
- Regional directorates: Turkish State Railways, Statistics Institute, Foundations, Meteorology.

The Grand National Assembly (TBMM) is the only law-making authority in Turkey and Adana Province is represented in it with 14 members. The last TBMM elections were held on June 7th, 2015 and in the Adana Province, the conservative AKP took 5 seats, social-democratic Kemalist CHP took 4 seats, nationalist MHP took 3 seats and Democratic socialist HDP took 2 seats.

=== Province Special Administration ===
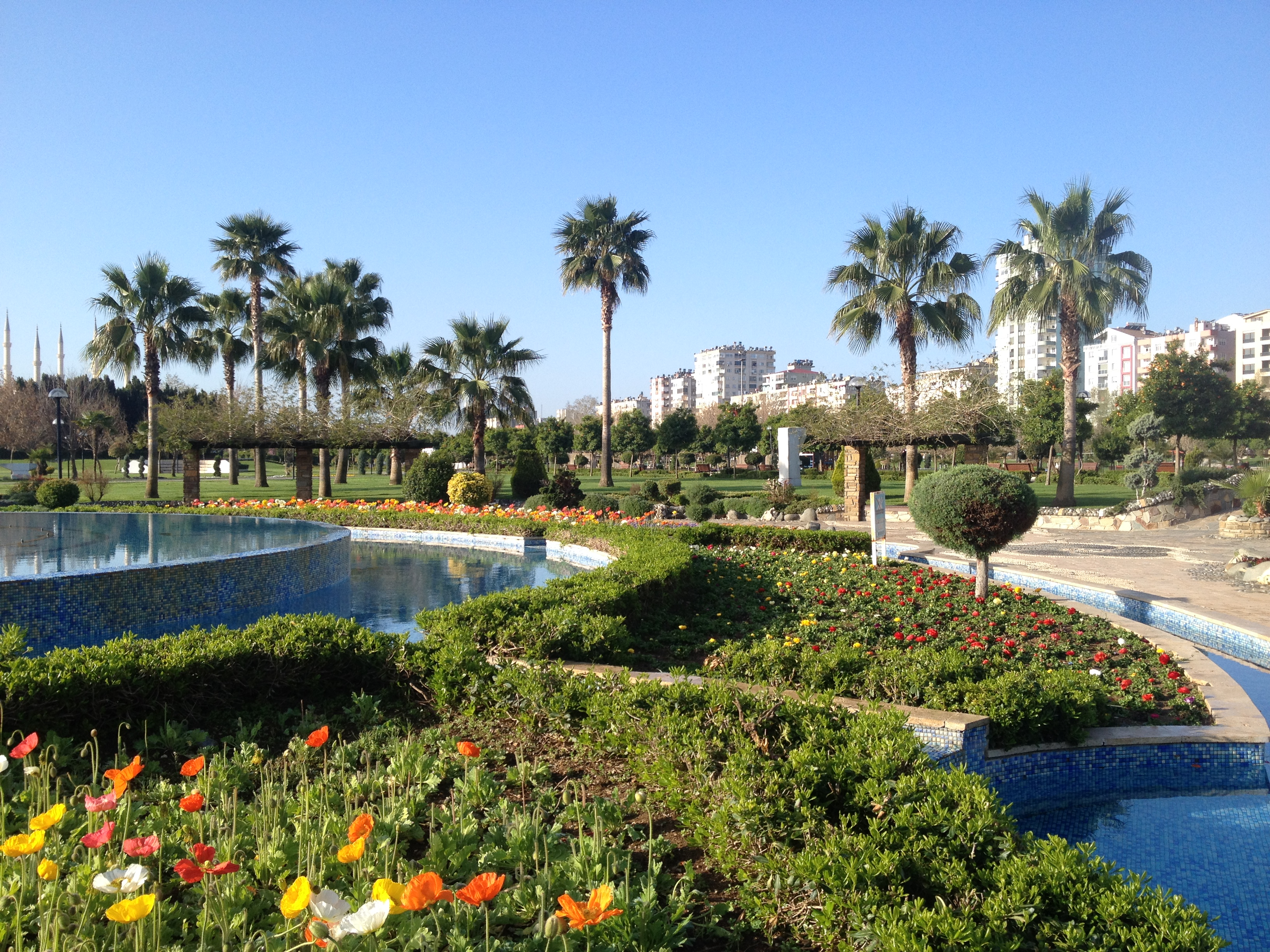
Adana park view

Adana Province Special Administration (Turkish: Adana İl Özel İdaresi) is a semi-democratic provincial governing body that has three organs; Provincial Parliament, Governor and the Encümen. Provincial Parliament members are elected democratically, the governor is appointed by the Central Government and 4 out of 8 members of the Encümen are appointed by the governor.

Province Special Administration is not a jurisdiction and has minor executive power in the administration of the province running with a budget of 55 million TL for 2010. The major executive duties of Special Administration are; building and maintenance of schools, residences and daycares, building and maintenance of other governmental buildings, roads, promoting arts and culture, protection and conservation of nature, social services and regional planning.

==== Provincial Parliament ====
Adana Provincial Parliament (Turkish: Adana İl Genel Meclisi) is the decision making organ of the Province Special Administration. It is formed of 61 members who represent the 15 districts. Members of the Parliament are nominated by the district branches of the National Parties during the Local Elections and are elected by the d'Hondt method. Each district is an electoral district and there is a 10% threshold for a party to gain seat at the district. There is no threshold at the provincial level. Parliament is administered by the president, two vice-presidents, and two secretaries general who are elected from the members. The current chair of the parliament is Abdullah Torun.

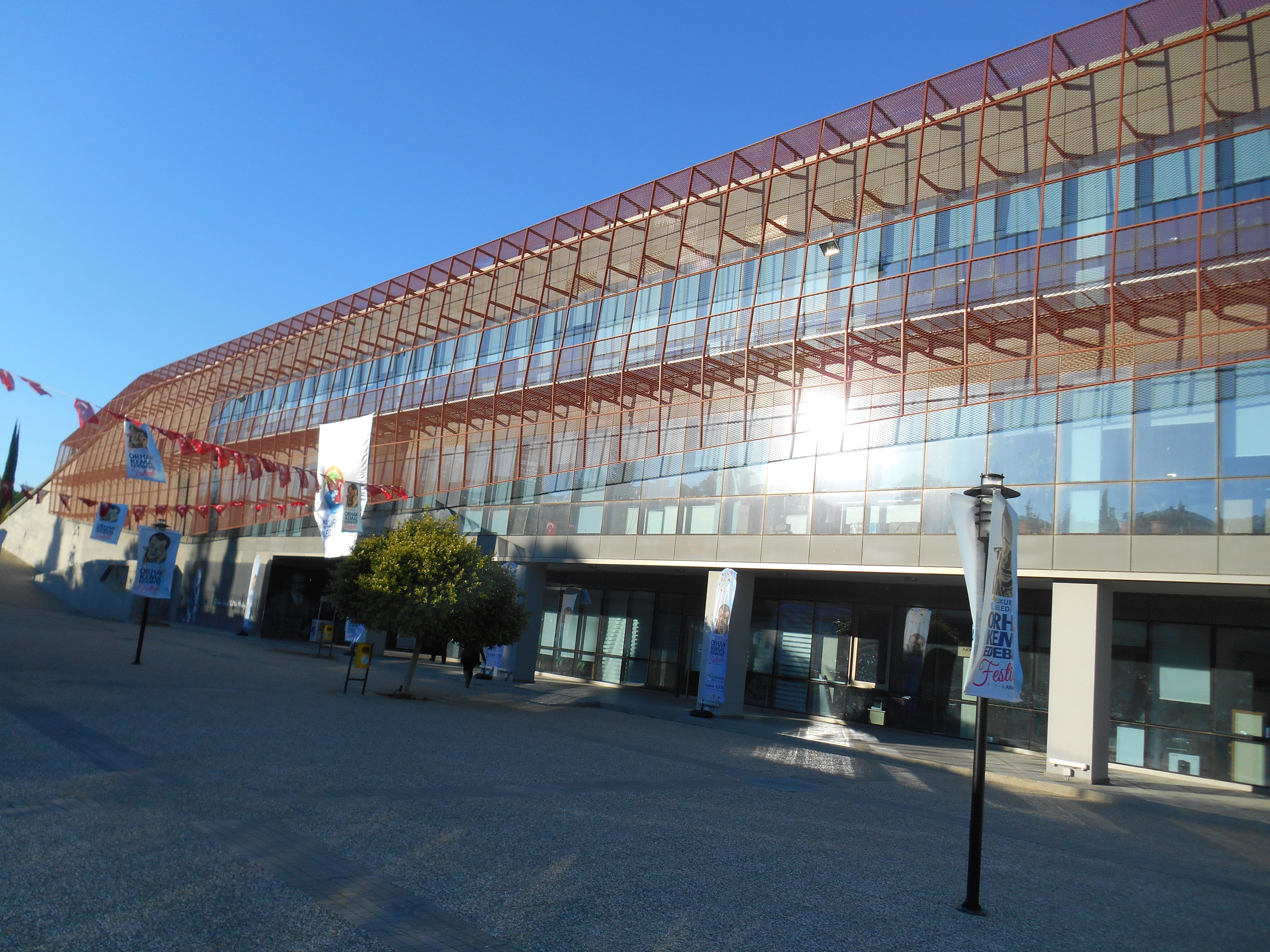
Orhan Kemal Cultural Centre belongs to Çukurova Municipality Hall

District	MPs
Seyhan	11
Yüreğir	8
Çukurova	7
Sarıçam	5
Karaisalı	2
Aladağ	2
Ceyhan	6
Feke	2
İmamoğlu	3
Karataş	2
Kozan	5
Pozantı	2
Saimbeyli	2
Tufanbeyli	2
Yumurtalik	2
Total	61

Current composition of the Parliament

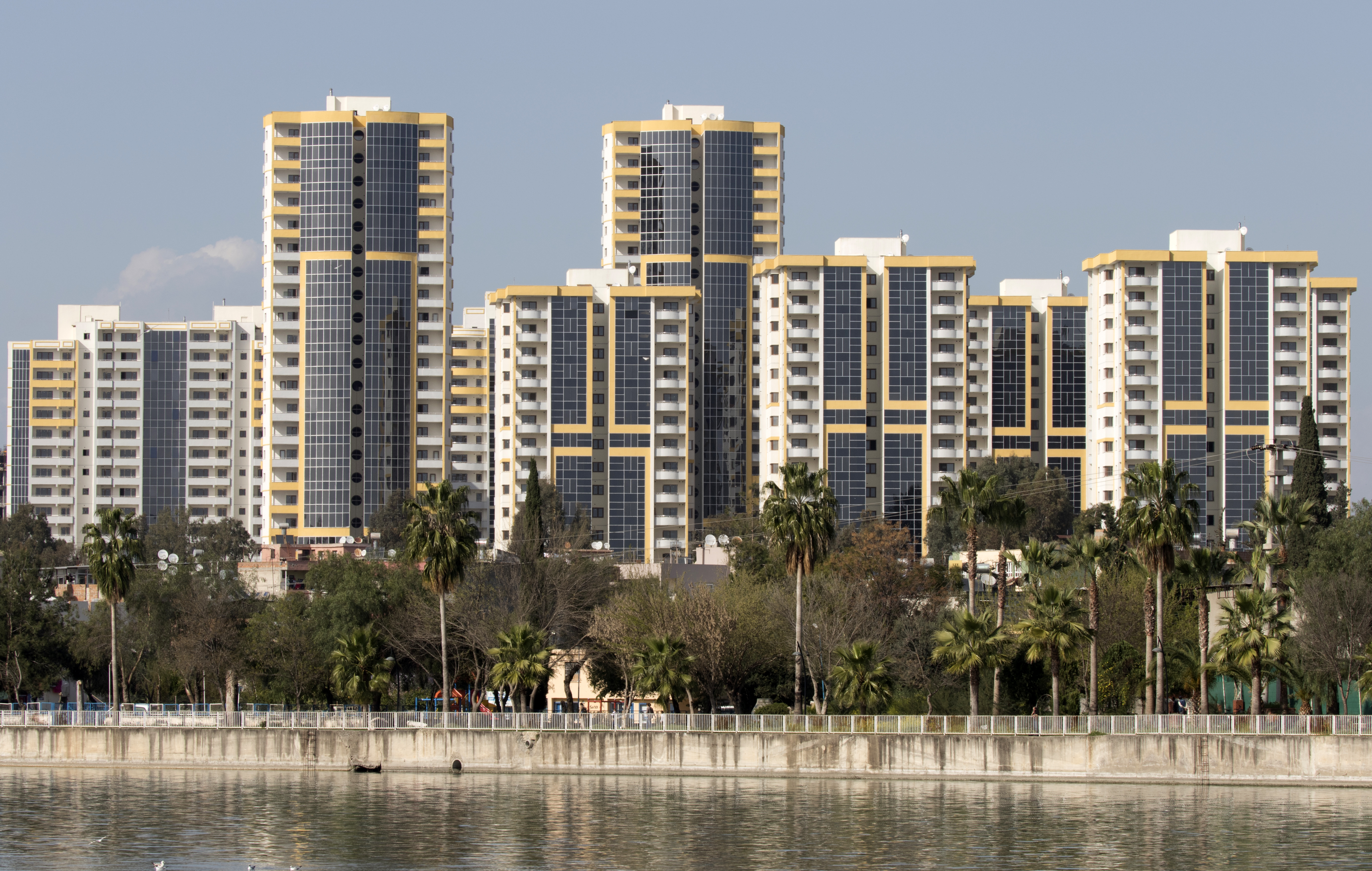
Social housing buildings in Adana.

The last election for the Provincial Parliament was held on March 29, 2009. Voting turnout was a high of 84.1% and 5 parties gained seat at the parliament. The results of the election were

Party	Votes		Seats	
	No	%	No	%
AK Party	324,968	29.8	27	44.3
MHP	296,338	27.17	23	37.7
CHP	252,073	23.11	9	14.75
DTP	86,775	7.96	1	1.64
DP	34,543	3.167	1	1.64
Other	95,989	8.8	0	0
Province	1,090,686		61	

After the election the sole DP member moved to MHP raising the seats of MHP to 24. Currently, DP does not hold a seat at the parliament.

== Governorship ==
=== Governor ===
Provincial governor (Turkish: Vali) is the chief executive of the Adana Province. Besides chairing the Turkish: Encümen, the governor also acts as the chief of the Provincial Directorates of the Central Government. The governor is appointed by the advice of the National Ministry of Internal Affairs to the Cabinet with the approval of the president of the republic. Yavuz Selim Köşger has been governor of the province since 2023.

District governors (Turkish: Kaymakam) are the chief executives of their districts. Districts are merely an administrative divisions of the province and the district governors work under the provincial governor.

=== Historic list of governors of Adana ===
==== Encümen ====
Encümen is the executive committee of the Adana Province Special Administration, consisting of 11 members. The governor is the chair of the Encümen. 5 members are chosen by the Provincial Parliament among their members annually and 5 members are the departmental directors of the APSA appointed by the governor annually.

=== Municipalities ===
There are total of 15 municipalities in the Adana Province, which are coterminous with the 15 districts. Municipal councillors of the metropolitan municipality are chosen from the district municipal councillors by the respective municipal councils.

The municipalities have three organs; municipal council, mayor and the encümen, the executive committee. Municipal councillors and the mayors are elected at the local elections. Encümen is formed by members half chosen from the council and the other half appointed by the mayor.

==== Neighborhoods ====
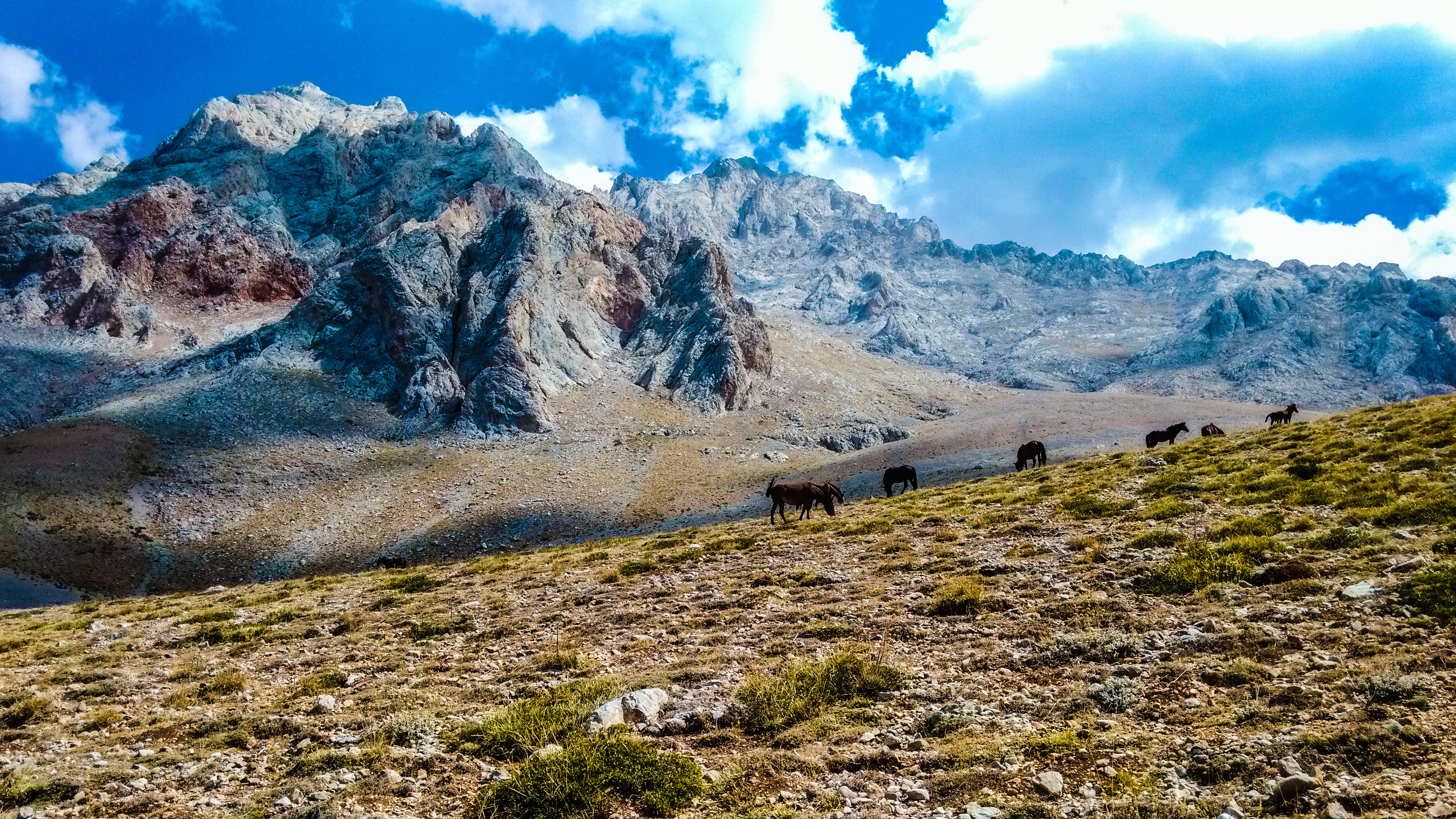
Aladağlar National Park in Adana Province is a popular tourism destination.

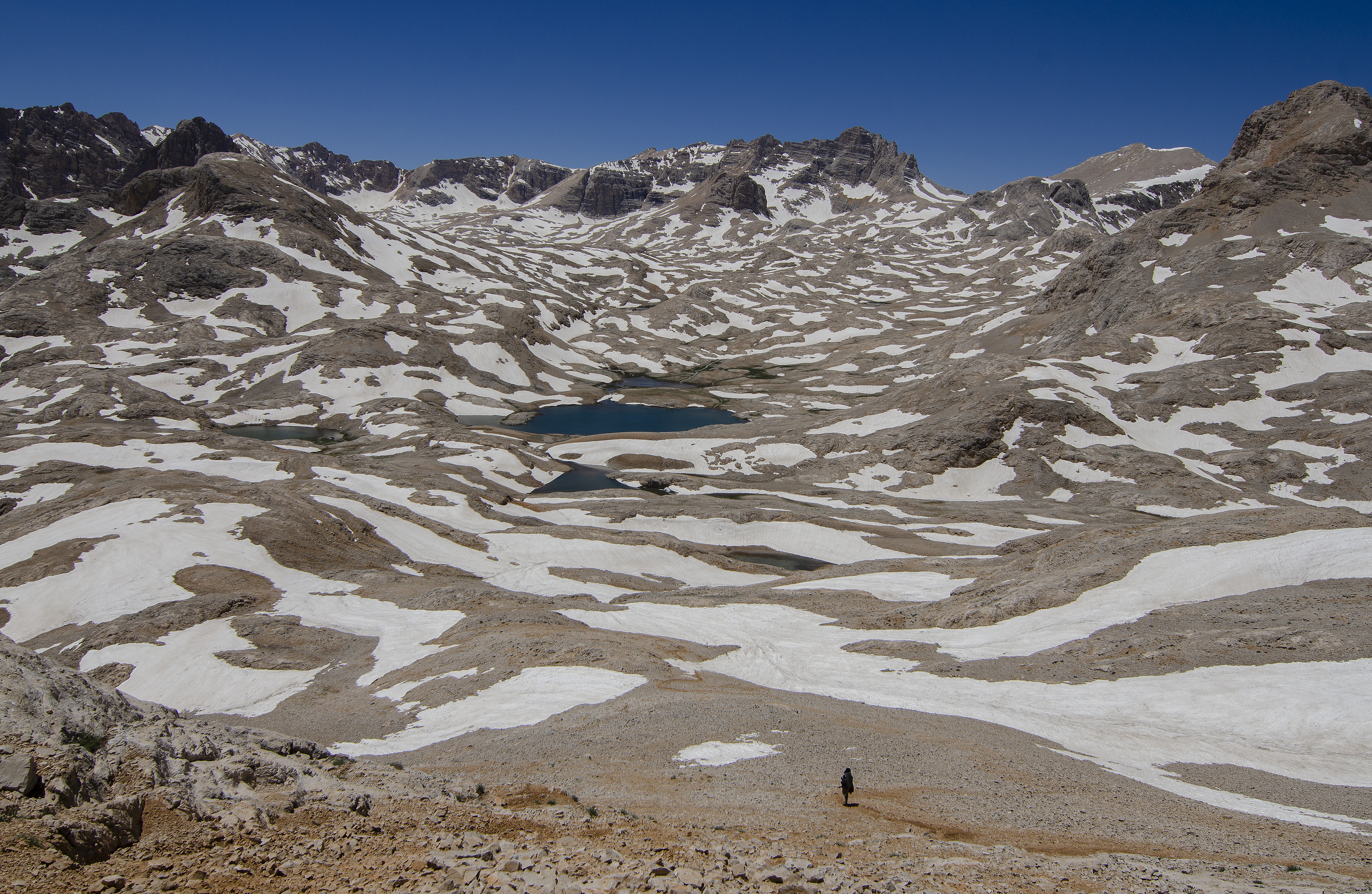
Aladağlar National Park during winter.

Mahala (Turkish: Mahalle) is the smallest administrative unit within a municipality, administered by the Muhtar and the Neighborhood Seniors Council (Turkish: Mahalle İhtiyar Heyeti) consisting of 4 members. Mahala administration is not an incorporation therefore does not hold government status. Although elected by the neighborhood residents, Muhtars are not granted any power nor budget, thus merely act as an administrator of the district Governor. Muhtar also voices the neighborhood issues to the municipal governments together with the Seniors Council. The Muhtar and the council members are elected by plurality at the local elections. Neighborhood administrators are not affiliated with political parties.

== Population ==
Historical population
Year	Pop.	±% p.a.
1927	227,718	—
1935	383,645	+6.74%
1940	375,777	−0.41%
1950	508,518	+3.07%
1960	760,803	+4.11%
1970	1,035,377	+3.13%
1980	1,485,743	+3.68%
1990	1,934,907	+2.68%
2000	1,849,478	−0.45%
2011	2,102,375	+1.17%
2020	2,258,718	+0.80%
2022	2,274,106	+0.34%
Source:Turkstat

The population of the Adana Province as at 31 December 2022 was 2,274,106. 88% of the population lives in the urban areas making the province one of the most urbanized provinces in Turkey. Annual population growth of the province is 0.76%, below the average growth of the nation. 78.25 % of the province's residents (corresponding to a population of 1,779,463) live in the city of Adana, which is made up of the whole of Seyhan District and most of Yüreğir, Çukurova and Sarıçam districts.

District	Urban	Rural	Total	Total end 2022
Seyhan	723,277	0	723,277	795,012
Yüreğir	417,693	4,836	422,529	404,726
Çukurova	343,770	4,171	347,941	389,175
Sarıçam	99,313	21,012	120,325	221,733
Karaisalı	7,465	15,516	22,981	22,042
Aladağ	4,139	13,030	17,169	15,897
Ceyhan	105,879	52,850	158,729	158,922
Feke	4,603	14,393	18,996	15,833
İmamoğlu	20,593	9,959	30,552	27,037
Karataş	8.483	12,777	21,260	23,499
Kozan	76,864	50,236	127,100	132,703
Pozantı	9,864	10,415	20,279	19,852
Saimbeyli	3,984	13,371	17,355	13,621
Tufanbeyli	5,376	12,696	18,072	16,400
Yumurtalik	5,129	13,531	18,660	17,654
Province	1,836,432	248,793	2,085,225	2,274,106

== Museums and heritage sites ==
Adana Province has 160 km. of coastline mostly free from human activities. Karataş and Yumurtalık are the two small settlements at the coast which host cottage dwellers and local tourism. Rest of the coast has conservation areas, farmlands and forests. With the ancient settlements, national parks, waterfalls, highlands and mountains, Adana Province has a mixture of different settings.

=== Museums ===
- Adana Archeological Museum in the city of Adana
- Adana Ethnography Museum
- Adana Atatürk Museum
- Misis Mosaic Museum

=== Historical sites ===
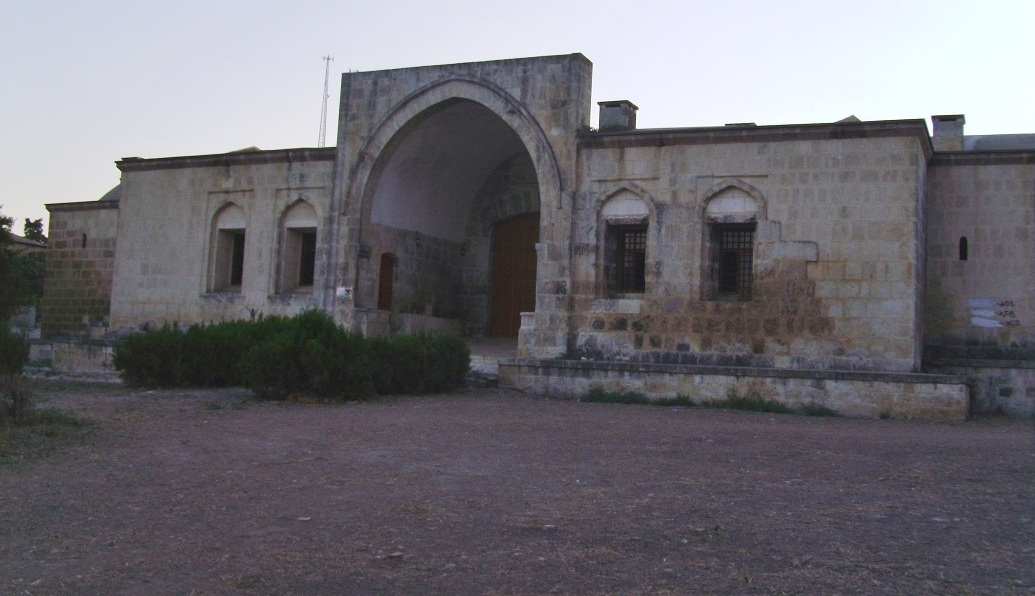
Kurtkulağı Kervansarayı

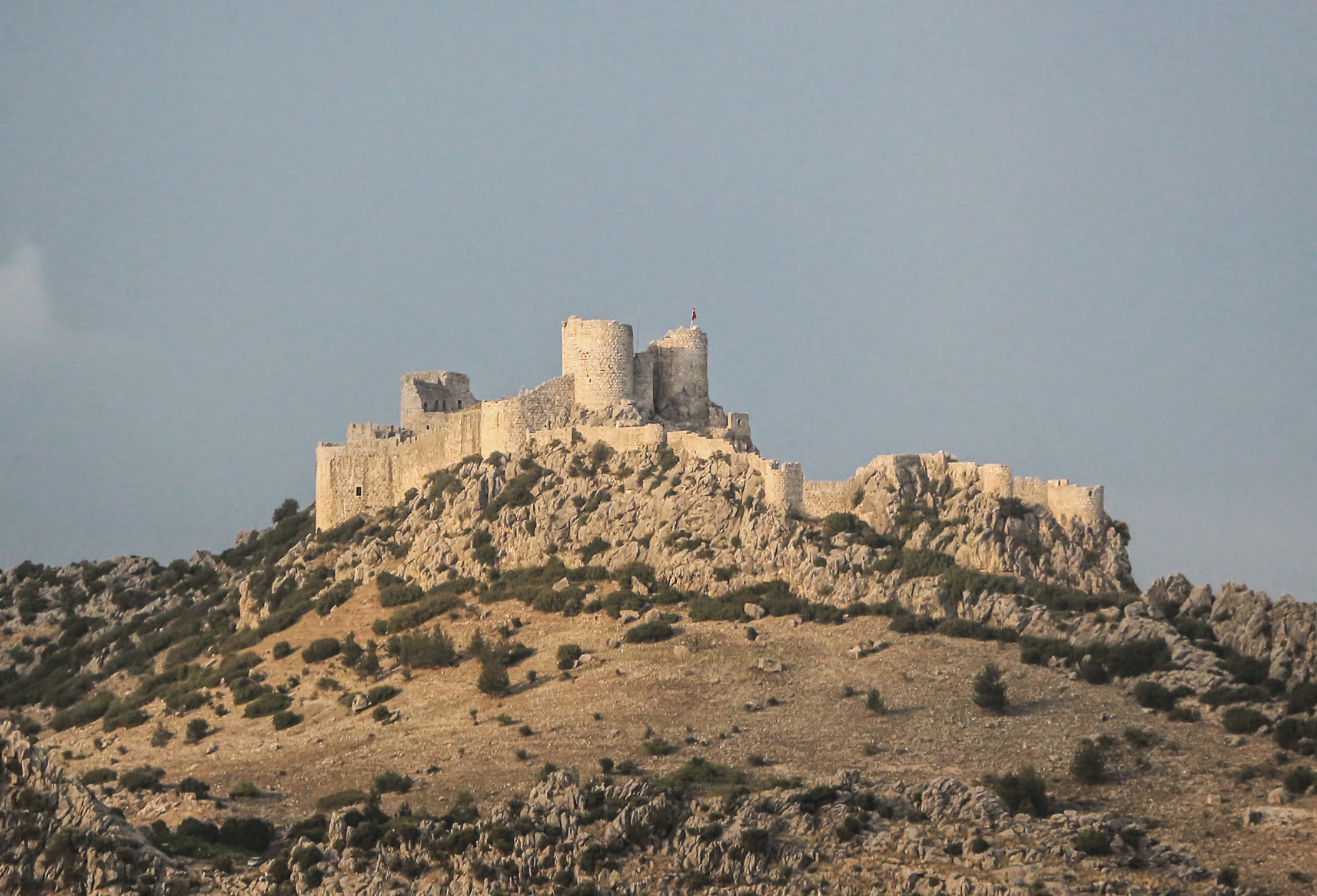
Yilankale (Snake Castle)

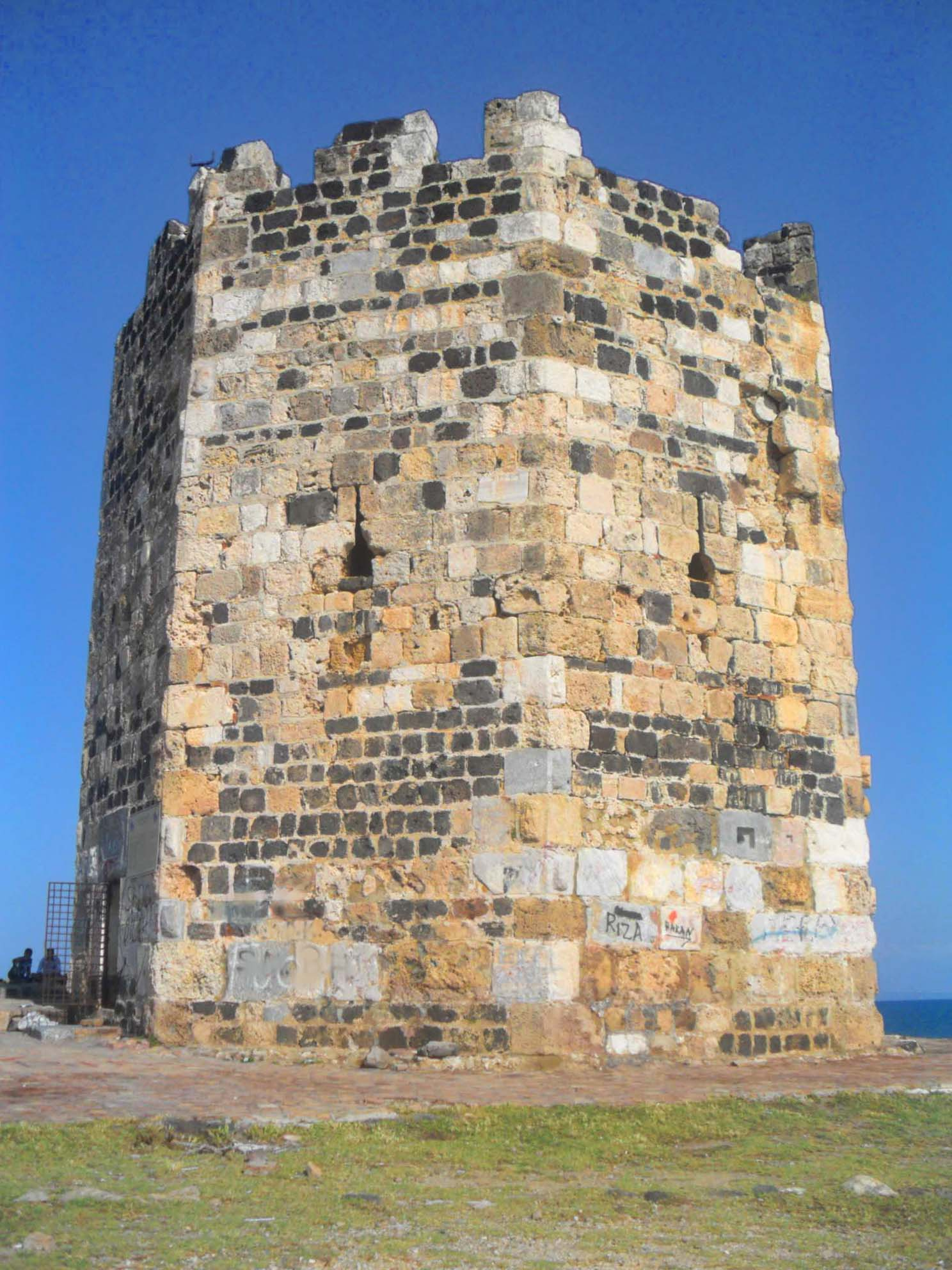
Süleyman's Tower

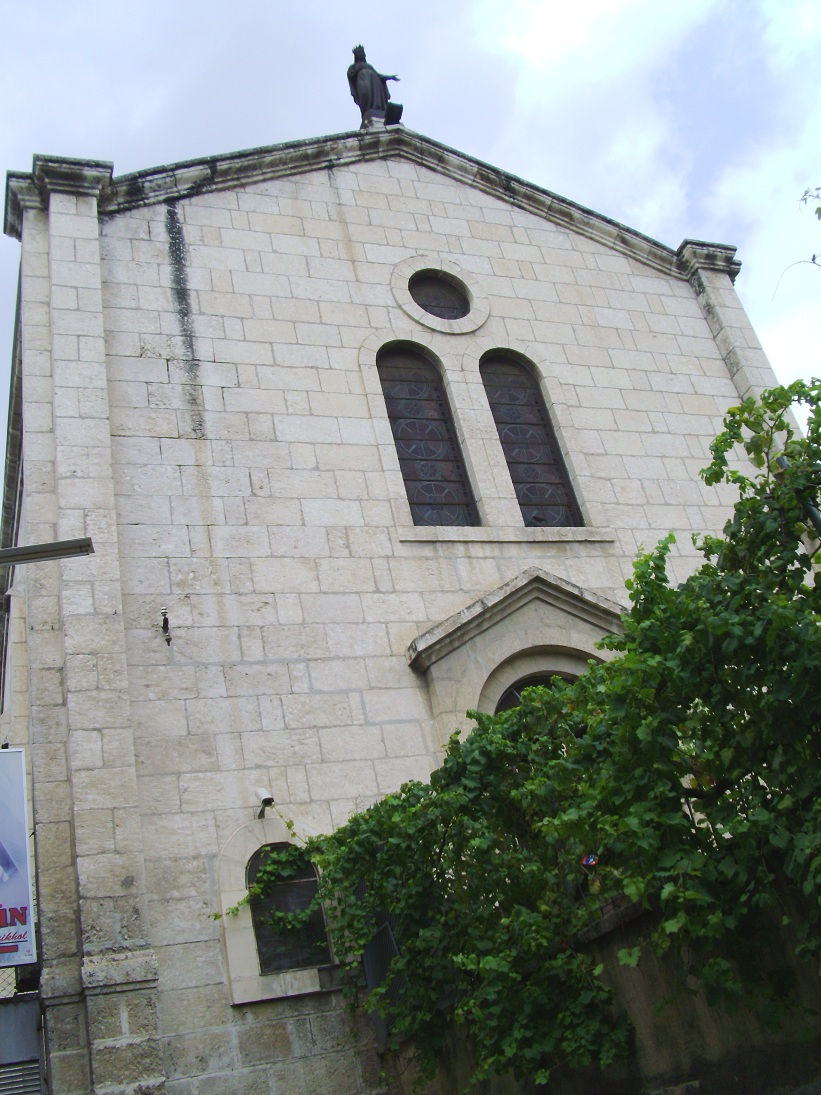
St Paul Church (Bebekli Kilise)

- Toprakkale (Misis)
- Dumlu Castle (Ceyhan)
- Yilankale (Snake Castle)
- Historical neighborhood of Tepebağ (Adana)
- Ramazanoğlu Hall (Adana)
- Kurtkulağı Caravanserai in Ceyhan
- Hayriye Hanım Hall in Reşatbey neighborhood of Adana
- Çarşı Hamam (Adana)
- Büyük Saat Clock Tower and the Bedesten (bazaar) in the city of Adana
- Taşköprü: 4th century Roman Bridge in the city of Adana
- Kozan Castle and Monastery
- Ulucamii in the city of Adana
- Hasan Ağa Masjid (Adana)
- Yağ Camii in the city of Adana
- Saint Paul Church (Bebekli Kilise) in the city of Adana
- Süleyman's Tower (Yumurtalık)

=== Ancient settlements ===
Ancient settlements in Adana Province
Name	Period	Distance to the city of Adana	District
Şar (Comona)	Hitite-Roman-Armenian	211 km.	Tufanbeyli
Ayas	Greek-Roman	78 km.	Yumurtalık
Mallos	Greek-Roman	50 km.	Karataş
Misis	Hitite-Roman-Arabic-Ottoman	27 km.	Misis, Yakapınar
Magarsos	Greek-Roman	50 km.	Karataş
Tumlu	Middle Age	50 km.	Ceyhan
Mazırık	Early Age	50 km.	Karaisalı
Anavarza			Ceyhan
Akören			Aladağ
Sirkeli Tumulus			

== Parks and conservation areas ==
Akyatan Lagoon is a large wildlife refuge which acts as a stopover for migratory birds voyaging from Africa to Europe. Wildlife refuge has a 14700-hectare area made up of forests, lagoon, marsh, sandy and reedy lands. Akyatan lake is a nature wonder with endemic plants and endangered bird species living in it together with other species of plants and animals. 250 species of birds are observed during a study in 1990. The conservation area is located 30 km south of Adana, near Tuzla.

Yumurtalık Nature Reserve covers an area of 16,430 hectares within the Seyhan-Ceyhan delta, with its lakes, lagoons and wide collection of plant and animal species. The area is an important location for many species of migrating birds, the number gets higher during the winters when the lakes become a shelter when other lakes further north freeze.

Aladağlar National Park, located north of Adana, is a huge park of around 55,000 hectares, the summit of Demirkazik at 3756m is the highest point in the middle Taurus mountain range. There is a huge range of flora and fauna, and visitors may fish in the streams full of trout. Wildlife includes wild goats, bears, lynx and sable. The most common species of plant life is black pine and cluster pine trees, with some cedar dotted between, and fir trees in the northern areas with higher humidity. The Alpine region, from the upper borders of the forest, has pastures with rocky areas and little variety of plant life because of the high altitude and slope.

== Mountains and plateaus ==
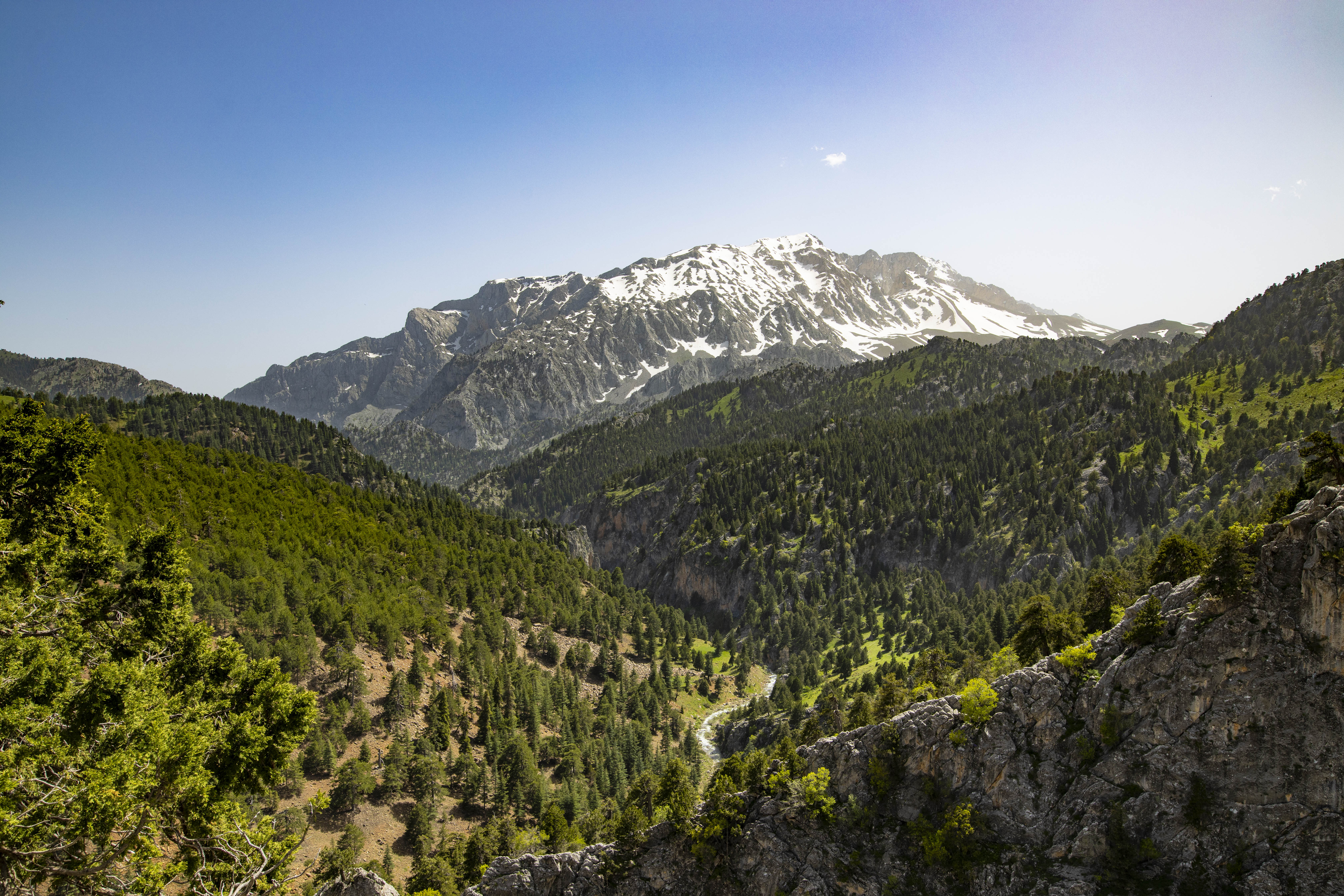
Aladağlar National Park

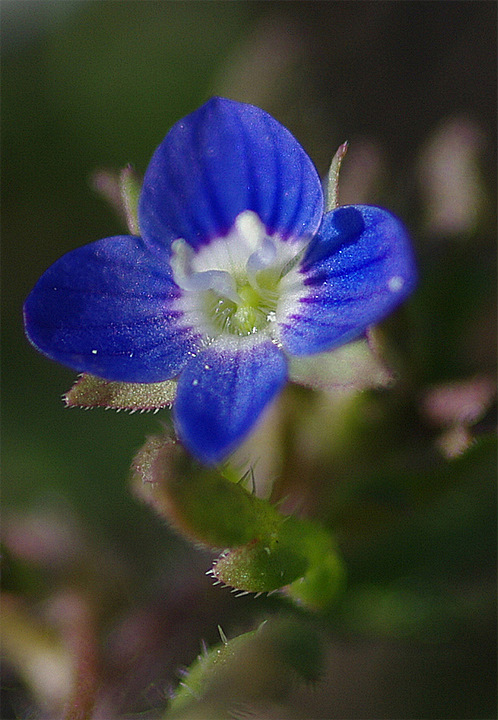
Speedwell

The Taurus Mountains contain many plateaus:

- Aladağ Meydan Plateau
- Aladağ Ağcakise, Başpınar Bıcı ve Kosurga Plateaus
- Feke İnderesi Village Plateaus
- Karaisalı Kızıldağ Plateau
- Karaisalı Kapıkaya Canyon
- Kozan-Horzum and Çulluuşağı Plateaus
- Kozan Göller Plateau
- Pozantı- Akçatekir Plateau
- Pozantı-Armutoluğu Plateau
- Pozantı Fındıklı Village Plateau
- Pozantı Belemedik Plateau
- Pozantı Asar Plateau
- Saimbeyli Çatak Plateau
- Tufanbeyli Kürebeli Plateau
- Tufanbeyli Obruk Plateau

== Festivals ==
- Altın Koza International Film Festival (07-13 June)
- International Sabancı Theater Festival (March 27- April 30)
- İmamoğlu Peach Festival - İmamoğlu (June)
- Kızıldağ Karakucak Wrestling Festival - Karaisalı
- Cherry Festival - Saimbeyli (20–22 June)

== Gallery ==
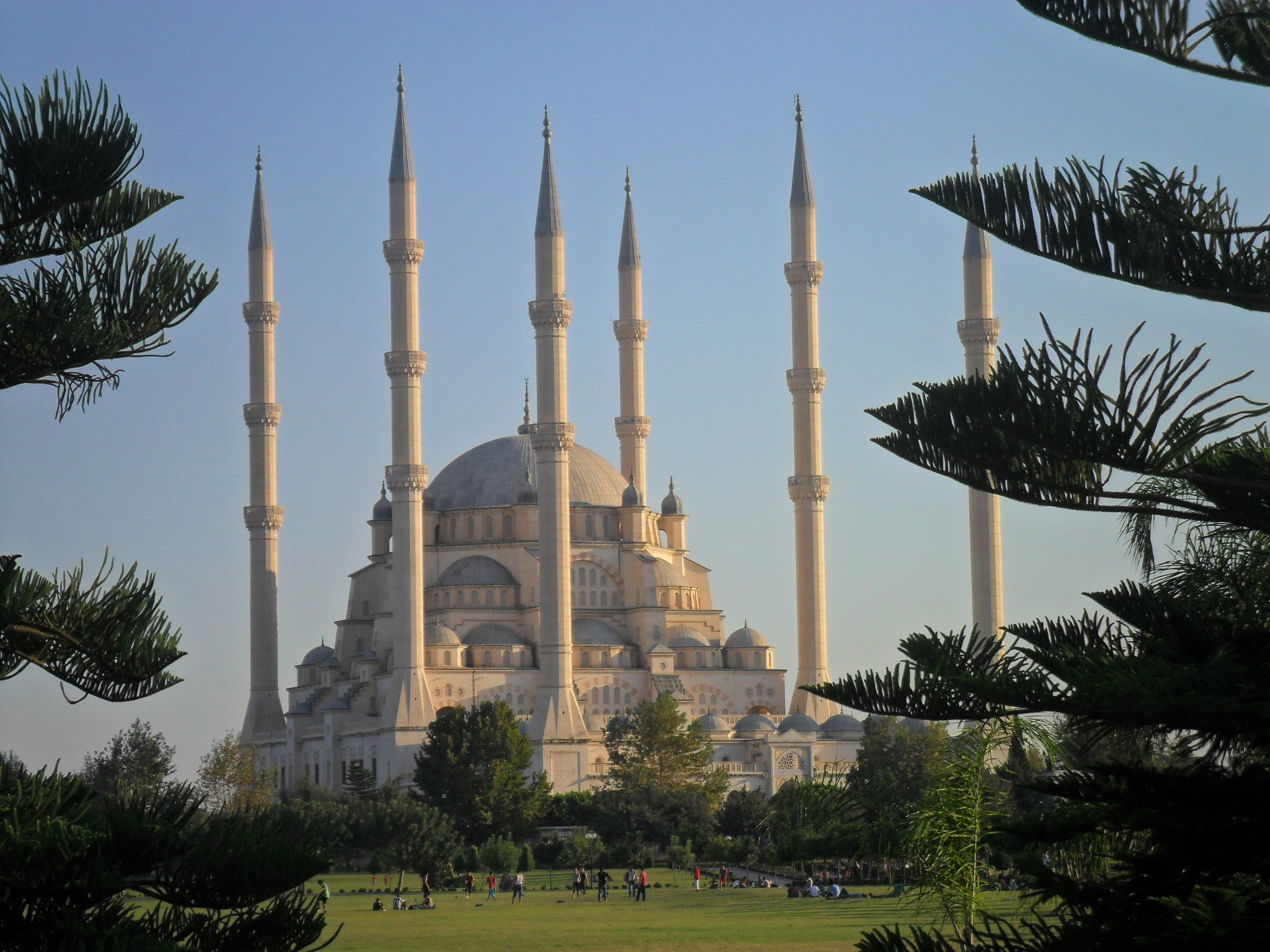
Sabanci Mosque,

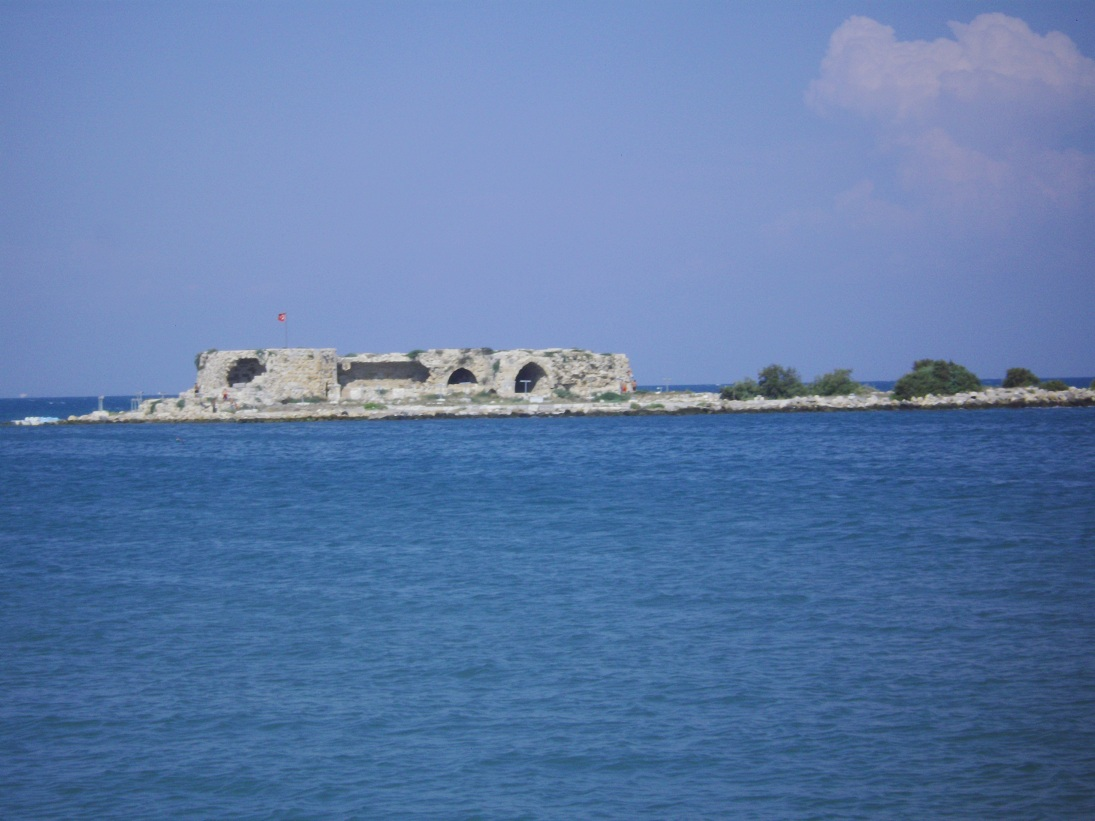
Deniz (Kız) Castle in Yumurtalık

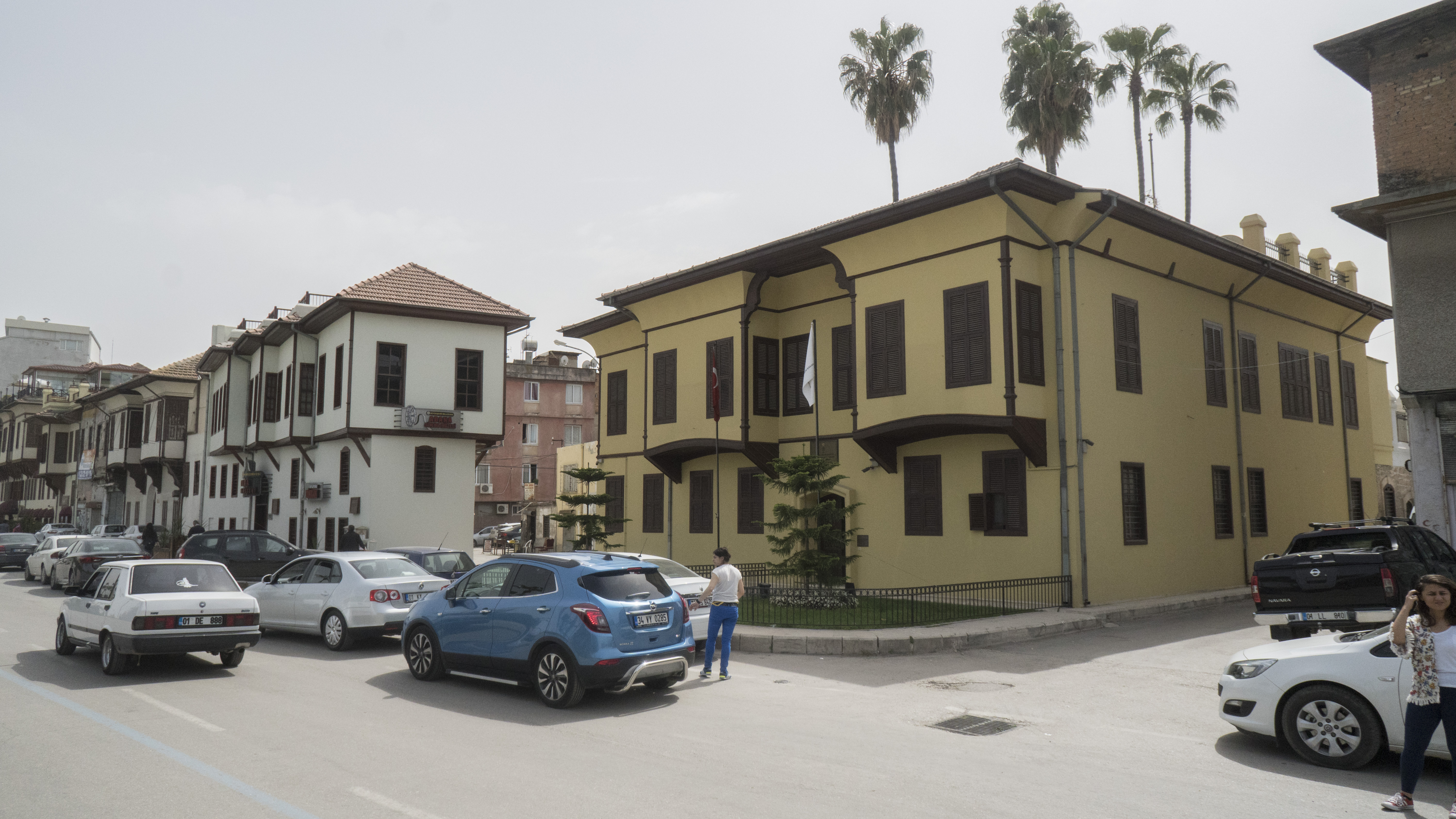
Historic houses in Adana

=== See also ===
- List of populated places in Adana Province
- Adana Province, Ottoman Empire (disambiguation)
- Akçatekir
- Bozgüney, Adana
- Çelemli
- Karaisalı
