= List of people from Adana =

This is a list of people from Adana.

- Ilyas Halil, was a Canadian banker, author, and poet
- Musine Kokalari Albanian writer and activist.
- Theophilus of Adana, Christian saint
- Ayşe Arman, columnist
- Aytaç Arman, actor
- İsmet Atlı, wrestler and Olympic gold medallist
- Kirkor Bezdikyan, mayor and deputy of Adana
- Hampartsoum Boyadjian, deputy of Adana
- Çağla Büyükakçay, Professional tennis player
- Selahattin Çolak, politician and mayor of Adana
- Demir Demirkan, musician and guitarist
- Aytaç Durak, politician and mayor of Adana
- Feridun Düzağaç, musician
- Haluk Levent, musician
- Ali Erdemir, scientist
- Timuçin Esen, actor
- Kasım Gülek, politician
- Tayyibe Gülek, economist and politician
- Salih Güney, actor
- Yılmaz Güney, film director, actor, scenarist, political activist
- Ayşe Hatun Önal, model and singer
- Şaziye İvegin-Karslı, basketball player
- Muzaffer İzgü, writer and educator
- Orhan Kemal, writer
- Yaşar Kemal, writer
- Eda Özerkan, actress
- Ali Özgentürk, film director
- Ali Sabancı, businessman (Sabancı Holding)
- Güler Sabancı, businesswoman (Sabancı Holding)
- Ömer Sabancı, businessman (Sabancı Holding)
- Özdemir Sabancı, businessman (Sabancı Holding)
- Ali Şen, actor
- Şener Şen, actor
- Hasan Şaş, footballer
- Jülide Sarıeroğlu, labour economist, trade unionist, politician and government minister
- Dolunay Soysert, actress
- Kıvanç Tatlıtuğ, actor and model
- Ferdi Tayfur, musician
- Fatih Terim, former footballer and now a football coach
- Hagop Terzian, writer and pharmacist
- Merve Emre, writer

== See also ==
- List of mayors of Adana
