= Kapıkaya =

Kapıkaya can refer to:

- Kapıkaya, Amasya
- Kapıkaya Canyon
- Kapıkaya Dam
- Kapıkaya, İliç
- Kapıkaya, Karaisalı
- Kapıkaya, Kozan
