= List of mayors of Adana =

The following list is the list of mayors of Adana, Turkey, after the proclamation of Turkish republic.,

Years	Mayor	Status of Adana
1922–1926	Ali Münif (Yeğenağa)	Provincial center
1926–1938	Turhan Cemal Beriker	Provincial center
1939–1946	Kasım Ener	Provincial center
1946–1947	Fazlı Meto	Provincial center
1947–1950	Hazım Savcı	Provincial center
1950–1951	Numan Güreli	Provincial center
1951–1954	Zahit Akdağ	Provincial center
1954–1955	Ali Sepici	Provincial center
1955–1956	Ali Bozdanoğlu	Provincial center
1956–1958	Galip Avşaroğlu	Provincial center
1958–1959	Daniş Arıklıoğlu	Provincial center
1959–1960	Ali Sepici	Provincial center
1960-1960	Talat Sungur	Provincial center
1960-1960	Gafuer Soylu	Provincial center
1960–1963	Mukadder Öztekin	Provincial center
1963–1968	Ali Sepici	Provincial center
1968–1973	Erdoğan Özlüşen	Provincial center
1973–1977	Ege Bagatur	Provincial center
1977–1980	Selahattin Çolak	Provincial center
1980–1981	Nuri Korkmaz	Provincial center
1981–1984	Ahmet Kelecek	Provincial center
1984–1989	Aytaç Durak	Provincial center
1989–1994	Selahattin Çolak	Metropolitan municipality
1994–2010	Aytaç Durak	Metropolitan Municipality
2010–2014	Zihni Aldırmaz	Metropolitan Municipality
2014–2019	Hüseyin Sözlü	Metropolitan municipality
2019–	Zeydan Karalar	Metropolitan municipality
