= Çukur (disambiguation) =

Çukur is a Turkish television series.

Çukur may also refer to:

== People ==
- Onur Çukur (born 1999), Turkish volleyball player
- Tiago Çukur (born 2002), footballer

== Places ==
- Çukur, Karaisalı, a neighbourhood in Adana Province, Turkey
- Çukur, Kayseri or Özvatan, a municipality and district of Kayseri Province, Turkey
- Çukur, Şavşat, a village in Artvin Province, Turkey
- Çukur, Tunceli, a village in Tunceli Province, Turkey
