= Topraklı =

Topraklı can refer to:

- Topraklı, Bismil
- Topraklı, Karaisalı
- Topraklı, Karataş
