= Çukurova, Adana =

Second level municipality in Adana, Turkey

Çukurova
- District and municipality
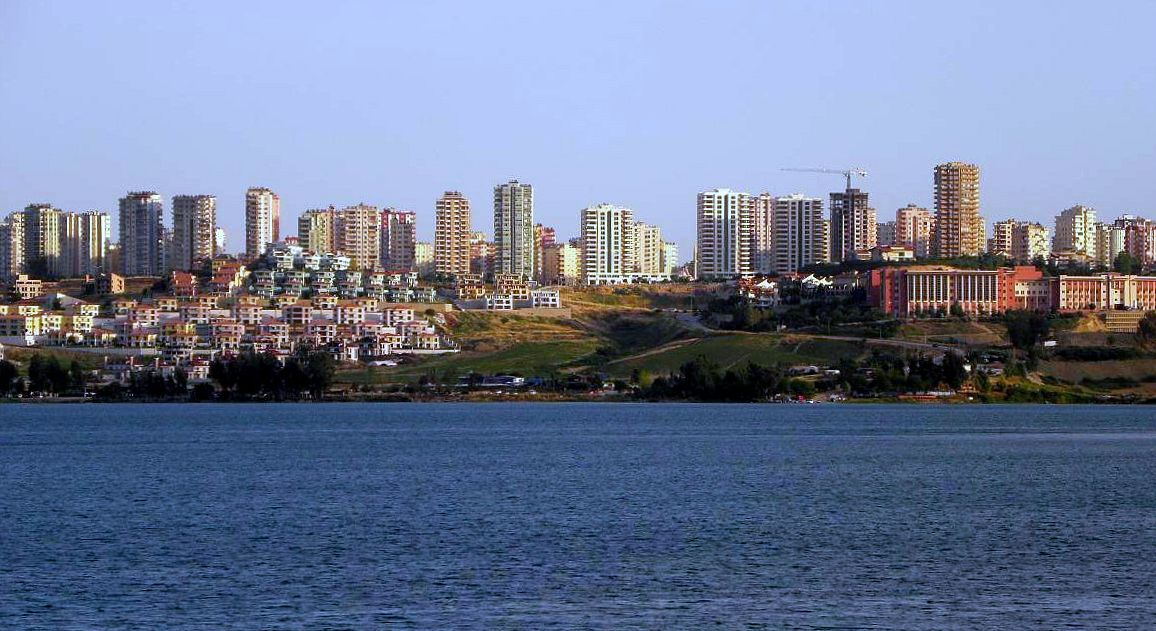

- Map showing Çukurova District in Adana Province

- Location within Turkey
- Coordinates: 37°03′N 35°17′E
- Country: Turkey
- Province: Adana

Government
  - Mayor: Emrah Kozay (CHP)
- Area: 250 km^{2} (97 sq mi)
- Elevation: 81 m (266 ft)
- Population (2022): 389,175
  - Density: 1,600/km^{2} (4,000/sq mi)
- Time zone: UTC+3 (TRT)
- Postal code: 01170
- Area code: 0322
- Website: www.cukurova.bel.tr

Çukurova is a municipality and district of Adana Province, Turkey. Its area is 250 km^{2}, and its population is 389,175 (2022). Its population is concentrated within the city of Adana, occupying north-west of the city. It is a modern residential district which came into being in the last 30 years as the city expanded north. Çukurova is located north of the Seyhan district, west of the Seyhan River and south of the Seyhan Reservoir.

== Geography ==
The district constitutes the northern Adana. The average altitude is about 30 m (98 ft).

== History ==
The land that Çukurova district now occupies was made up of orchards, forestry and scattered villages. After Aytaç Durak's election as the mayor of Adana, an extensive urban plan was made. The urban plan consisted of 200,000 homes, several parks, schools and shopping places to be built over the next 30 years. The project was named as New Adana and the area grew rapidly during the 1990s. In 2008 the district Çukurova was created from parts of the districts Seyhan and Karaisalı. The urban part of the new district, 11 neighbourhoods formerly part of Seyhan, was established as a municipality. At the 2013 Turkish local government reorganisation, the rural part of the district was integrated into the municipality, the villages becoming neighbourhoods.

== Governance ==
Çukurova district is administered by three levels of government; central government, provincial administration and the municipality.

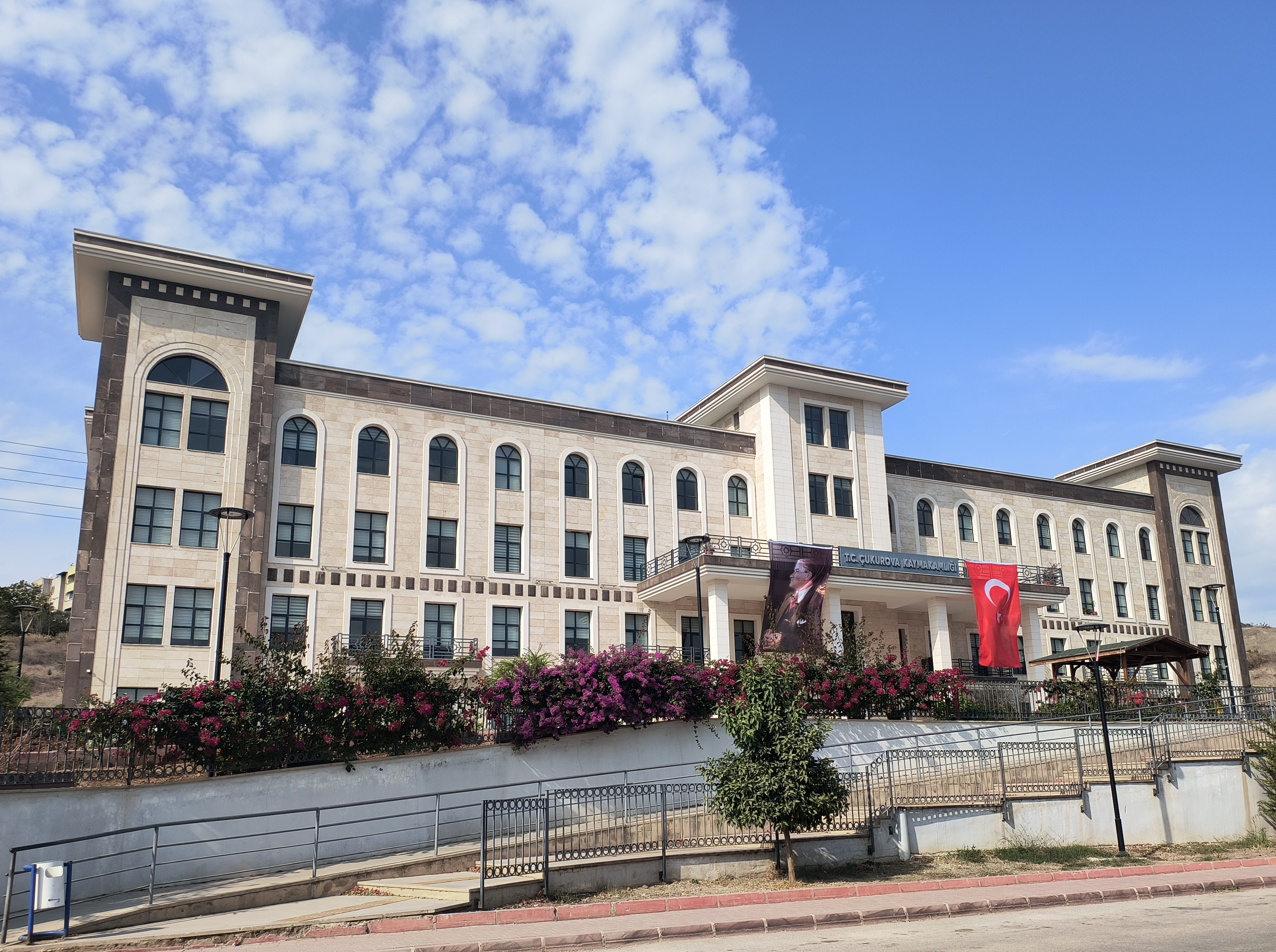
District Hall

Çukurova Governorship is the district branch of the central government operating under the Adana Governorship. The chief executive of the Çukurova district is the District Governor who is appointed by the Ministry of Internal Affairs. Çukurova Governorship overseas the functioning of the district directorates of the ministries.

Çukurova directorate of the Adana Province Special Administration is the district branch of the provincial administration. Çukurova district is represented with 7 members at the 61-member Adana Provincial Parliament.

=== Çukurova Municipality ===
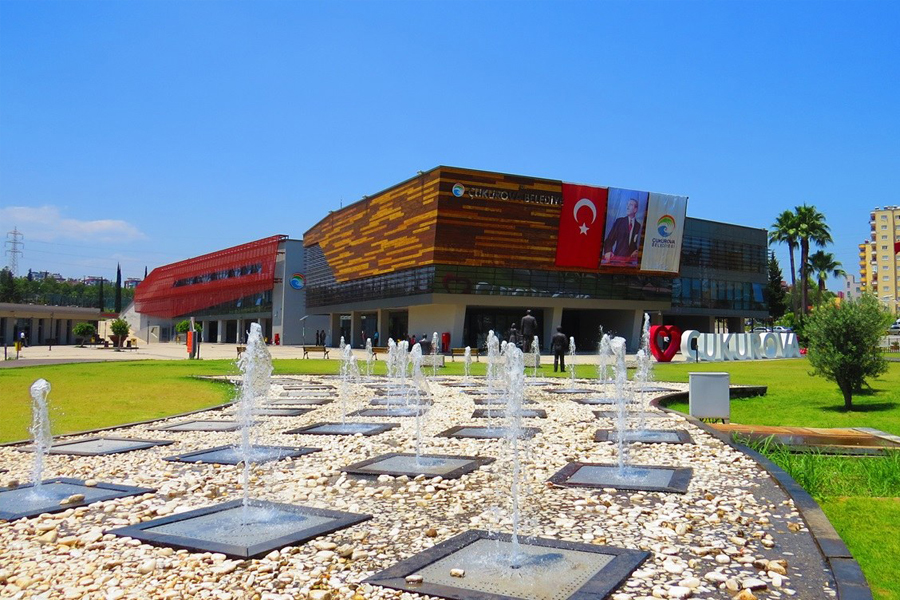
Municipal Hall

There is only one municipality incorporated in the Çukurova district. Çukurova Municipality is a lower tier municipality of the city of Adana and serves most of the district. The municipality is further divided into neighborhoods.

Mayor is the chief executive of the municipality, presides municipal departments and chairs the municipal council. Mayoral candidates are either nominated by the national parties or run independently. The mayor is elected by first past the post voting for a 5-year term.

Encümen is the executive committee of the Çukurova Municipality. The mayor presides the encümen and the committee consists of 7 members, 3 councilors elected from the municipal council, 3 department directors appointed by the mayor and the treasurer.

Municipal Council is the decision making organ of the Çukurova Municipality. It is responsible for approving by-laws, founding, splitting or amalgamating neighborhoods, strategic planning, urban development planning and zoning, making investments, budgeting, loaning and controlling the mayor's activities. The chair of the council is the mayor. The council consists of 37 members. The candidates for the councilor positions are either nominated by National Parties or run independently. The councilors are elected by the d'Hondt method, where the whole municipality is one electoral district and there is 10% threshold for a party to gain seat at the council. As with mayor, councilors are elected for a 5-year term. Left leaning CHP leads the council with 18 members, Turkish nationalist MHP has 10, conservative AKP has 7 members at the council and two members are independent.

Çukurova Mayor Election, 2019
Party		Candidate	Votes	%	±%
1	CHP	Soner Çetin	125,467	58,37	
2	MHP	Yusuf Baş	78,194	36,38	
3	SP	İbrahim Ethem Can	4050	1,88	

=== Neighbourhoods ===
Neighbourhoods (Mahalle) are small administrative units within the municipalities, and are administered by the muhtar and the Neighborhood Seniors Council consisting of 4 members. Muhtar and the Senior Council are elected for 5 years at the local elections and are not affiliated with political parties. Neighborhoods are not an incorporation therefore do not hold government status. Muhtar, although being elected by the residents, acts merely as an administrator of the district governor. Muhtar can voice the neighborhood issues to the municipal hall together with the Seniors Council.

Çukurova has a total of 27 neighbourhoods. Fourteen of them are in the urban area and thirteen of them are outside the urban area. The neighborhoods outside the urban area are the former villages and the municipalities that annexed to the city of Adana as city borders are expanded in 2008.

Due to the law numbered 5747, titled "LAW ON THE ESTABLISHMENT OF DISTRICTS WITHIN THE METROPOLITAN MUNICIPALITY BOUNDARIES AND AMENDING CERTAIN LAWS," published in the Official Gazette on March 22, 2008, issue number 26824 (Duplicate), the following neighborhoods were transferred from SEYHAN district to ÇUKUROVA :

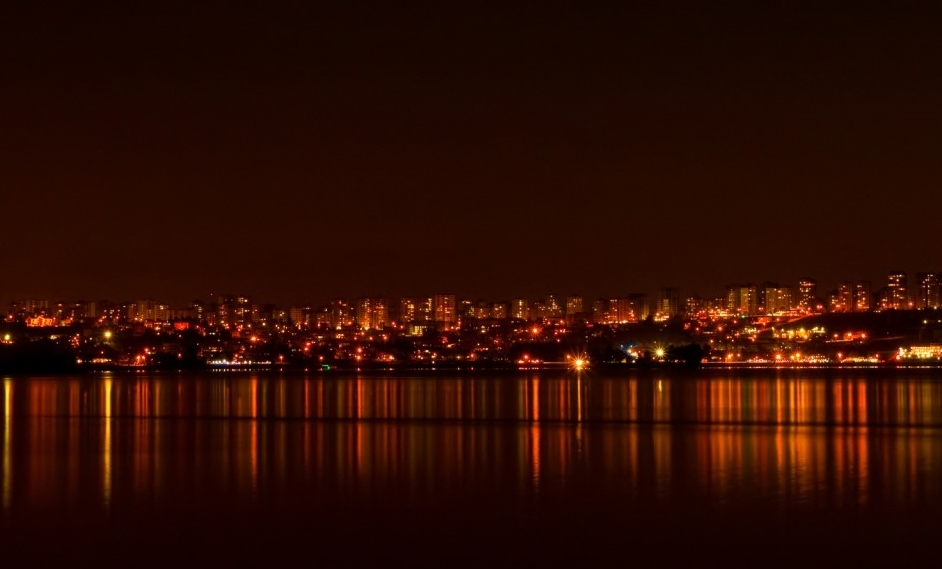
Güzelyalı neighborhood

1. Beyaz Evler
2. Güzelyalı
3. Karslılar
4. Kurttepe
5. Mahfesığmaz
6. Toros
7. Belediye Evleri
8. Esentepe
9. Huzurevleri
10. Şambayat
11. 100. Yıl
12. Yurt

The 27 neighbourhoods of Çukurova District are:

- Belediyeevleri
- Beyazevler
- Bozcalar
- Dörtler
- Esentepe
- Fadıl
- Gökkuyu
- Güzelyalı
- Huzurevleri
- Kabasakal
- Karahan
- Karslılar
- Kaşoba
- Kocatepe
- Küçükçınar
- Kurttepe
- Mahfesığmaz
- Memişli
- Örcün
- Pirili
- Salbaş Esentepe
- Şambayadı
- Söğütlü
- Toros
- Yeni
- Yurt
- Yüzüncüyıl

=== Neighborhoods in the urban area ===
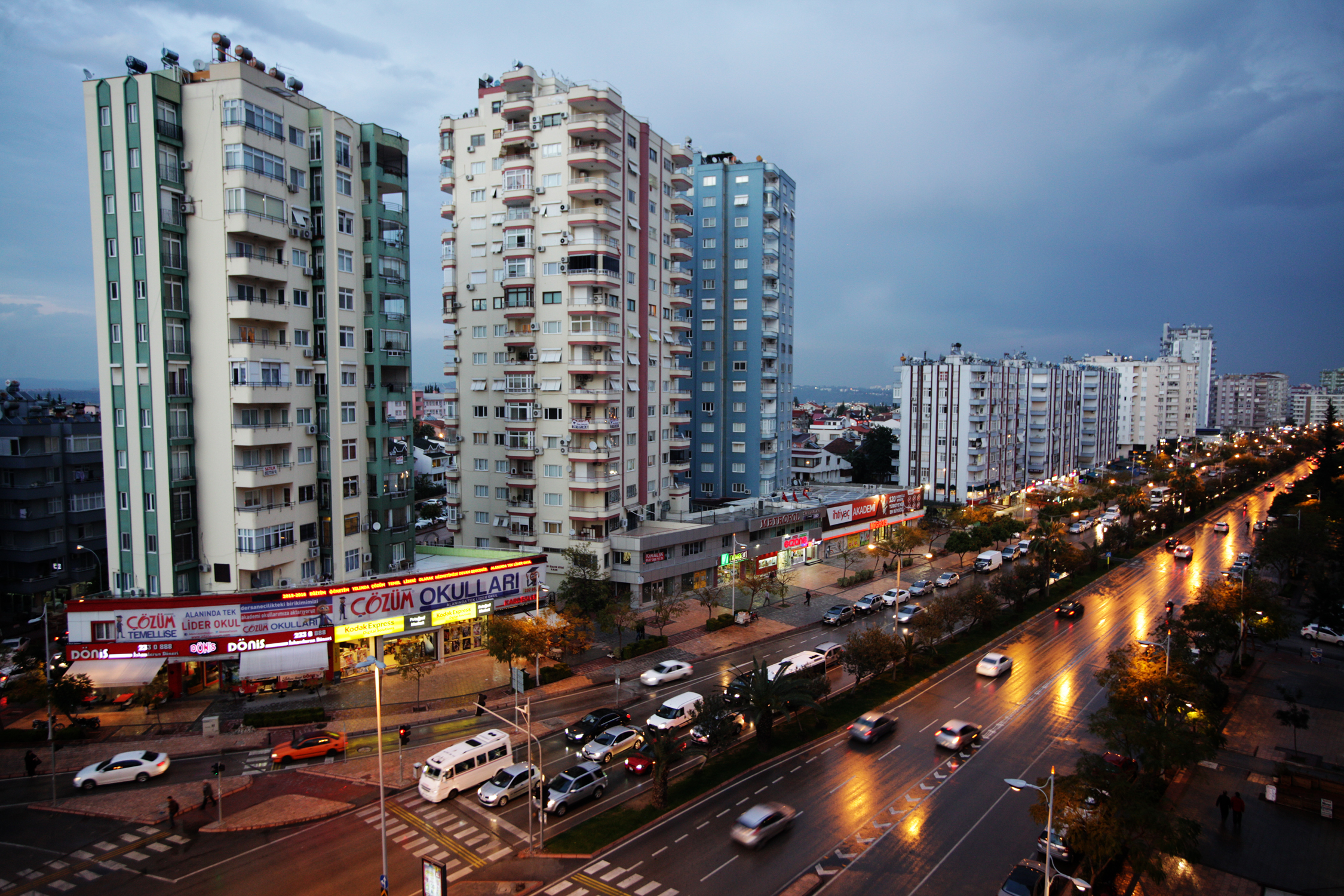
Turgut Özal boulevard in Çukurova

The urban neighborhoods of Çukurova are spread into 3 distinctive zones. The major separators of these zones are the Adana Metro and the Turgut Özal boulevard.

North of Turgut Özal Boulevard: The most scenic section of Adana, the zone is all residential, villas on the hills overlooking to the Seyhan Reservoir and high rise buildings along Turgut Özal and Süleyman Demirel Boulevards. This zone is bounded with Özal Boulevard on the south, Sadık Ahmet Boulevard on the west and Seyhan Reservoir on the north. The 4 neighborhoods of this zone are, Beyazevler, Güzelyalı, Karslılar and Kurttepe.

East of the Adana Metro: Bounded with Turgut Özal Boulevard on the east and north, Adana Metro on the west and Seyhan district on the south, this zone is heavily residential. The 3 neighborhoods of this zone are, Yurt, Mahfesığmaz and Toros.

West of the Adana Metro: Bounded by Adana Metro on the west, Turgut Özal Boulevard on the north, Tapantepe Road on the west and Seyhan district on the south, this zone is rapidly developing area of the city. Western section is zoned for low-rise and eastern section is heavily residential with high-rise buildings. The 5 neighborhoods of the zone are, Huzurevleri, Belediye Evleri, Yüzüncüyıl, Esentepe, Kabasakal and Şambayadı.

=== Neighborhoods outside the urban area ===
As the city borders expanded the municipalities and villages in the new limits of the city are annexed to the city. Neighborhoods of the former municipalities and former villages then became part of the Çukurova district as neighborhoods.

== Sports ==
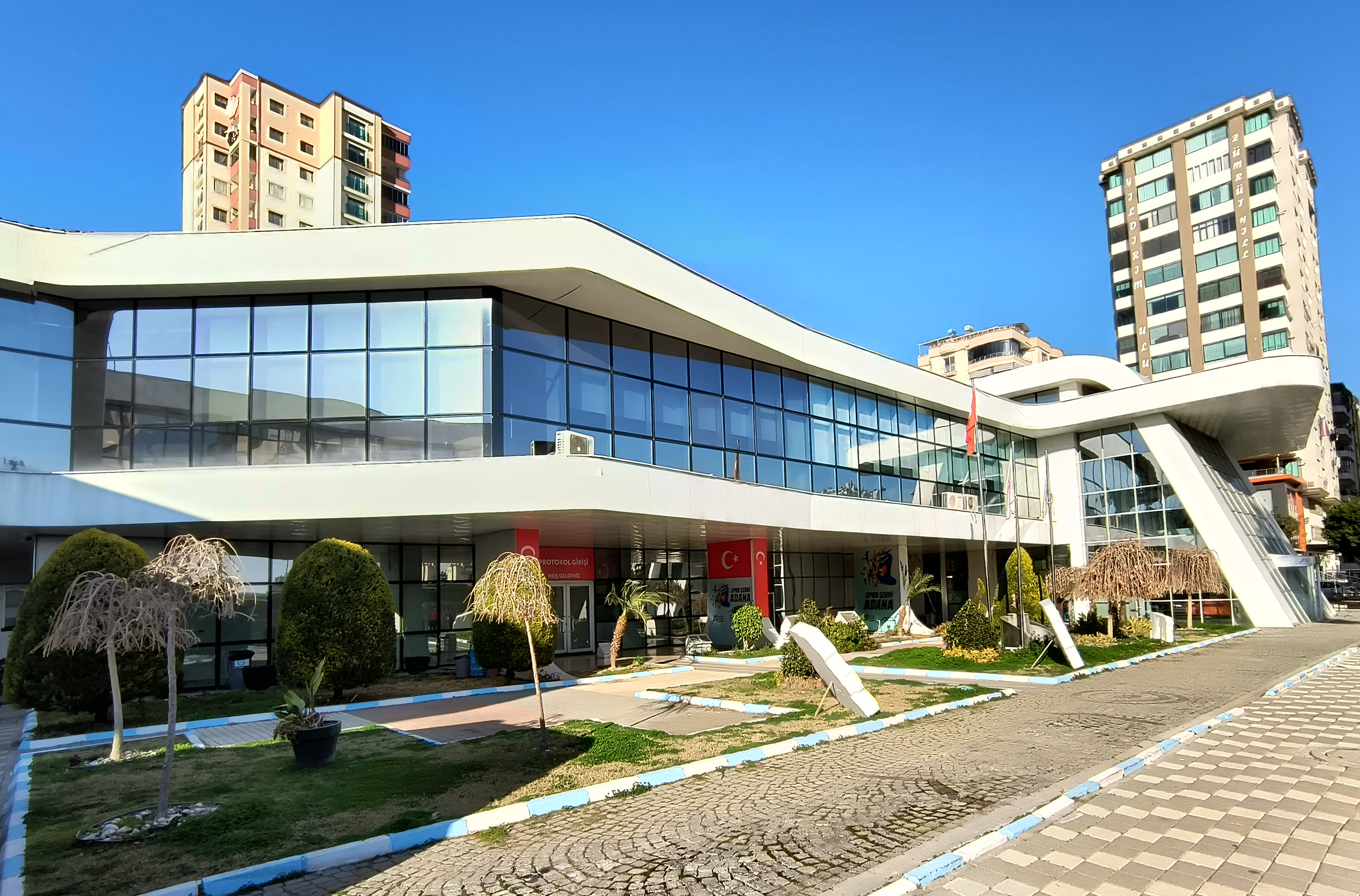
ASKİ Atatürk Sports Hall

Çukurova district is home to several sports facilities. ASKİ Atatürk Sports Hall hosts indoor sports, mainly basketball, volleyball and handball. The sports hall is home to the teams of Adana Büyükşehir Belediyespor and Çukurova Belediyespor from different branches.

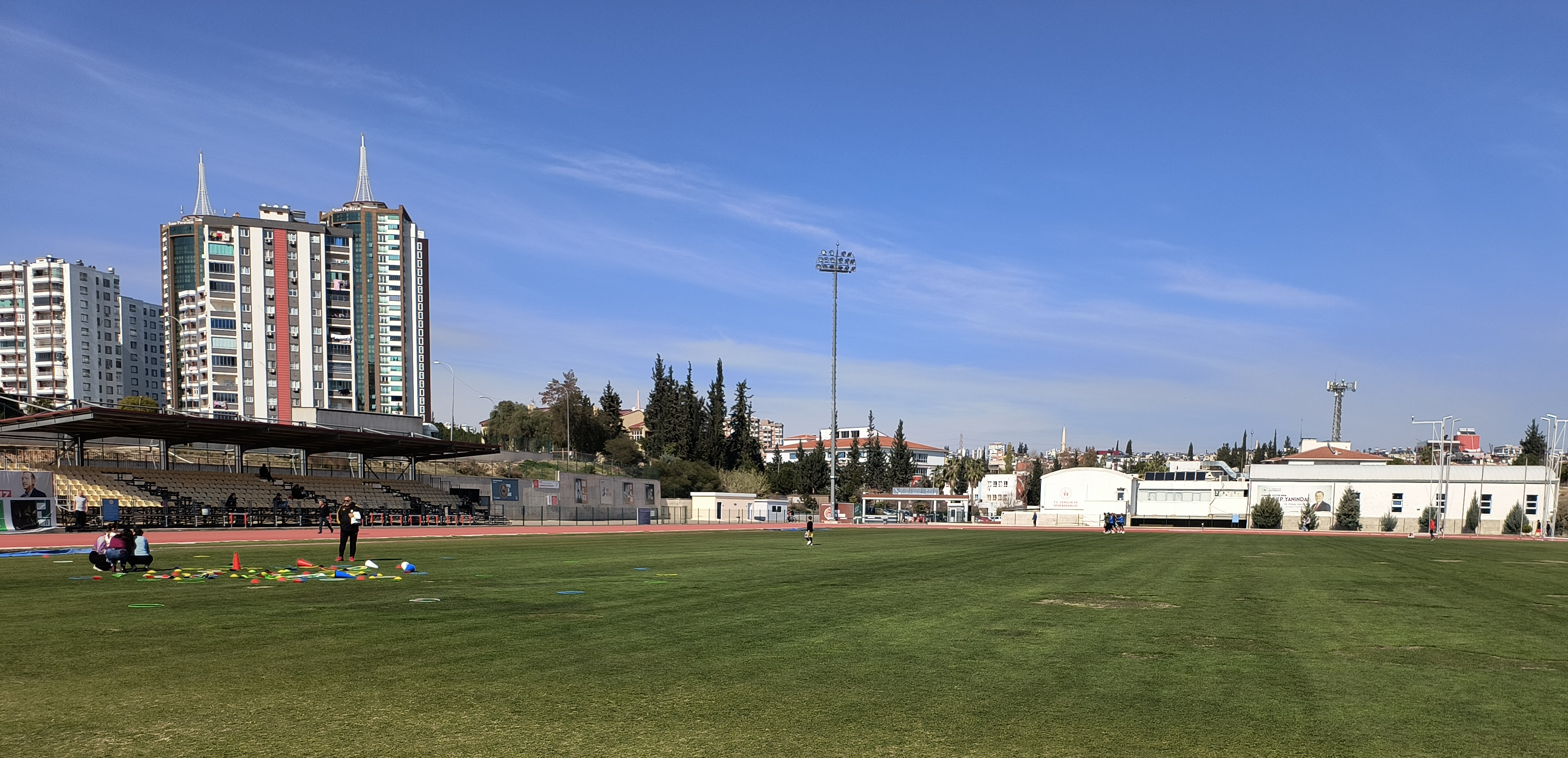
Çukurova Athletics Track

Tevriz Dura Stadium is the football facility of the district and it is located in the Yüzüncü Yıl neighborhood. The stadium is home to district's Çukurova Belediyespor, Çukurova Demirspor, Çukurova Gençlerbirliği and Yüzüncü Yıl SK clubs which all compete at the Adana League.

Çukurova Athletics Track is the center for athletics in the district. Hayal Park is the swimming complex of the district hosting swimming competitions for different age groups. Adana Sailing Club is a facility for sailing, rowing and canoeing.

== Transportation ==
Local public transportation in Çukurova district is conducted by the Adana Metro, Adana Metropolitan Municipality Buse and the minibuses.

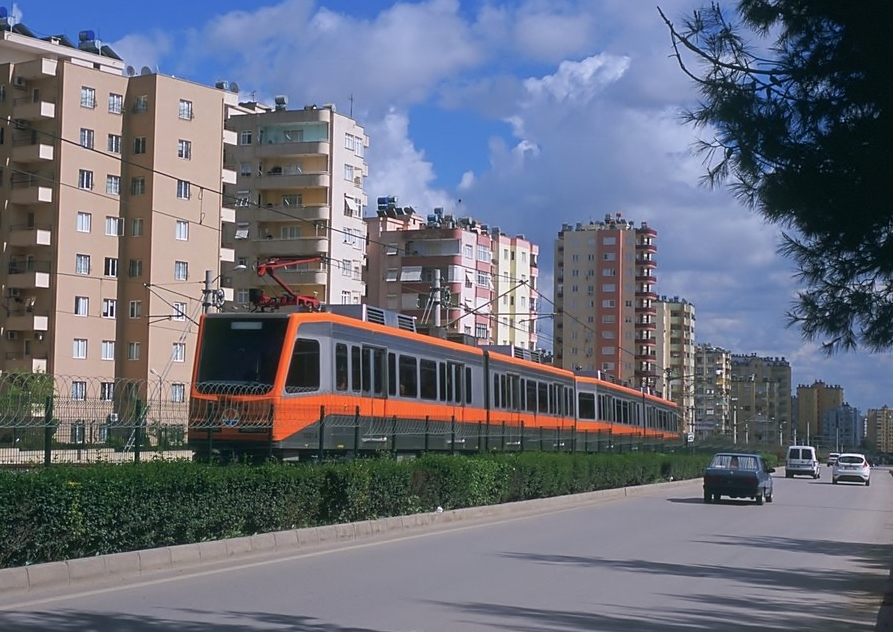
Adana Metro at Huzurevi District.

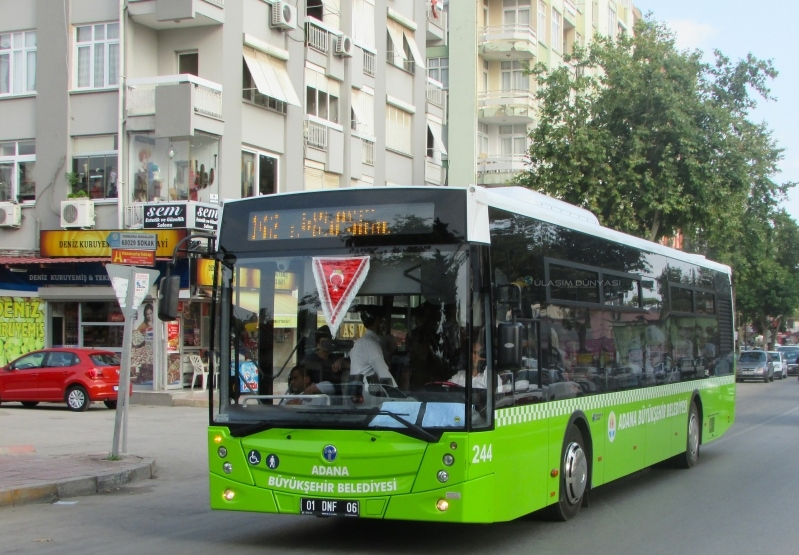
Metropolitan buses on the headway.

Adana Metro serves with 4 stations in Çukurova: Hastane, Anadolu Lisesi, Huzurevi and Mavi Bulvar. Metro line starts in Çukurova and goes Seyhan and Yüreğir districts. Metro accepts bus cards (KentKart) for payment and runs between 06:00 A.M. and 23:00 P.M.

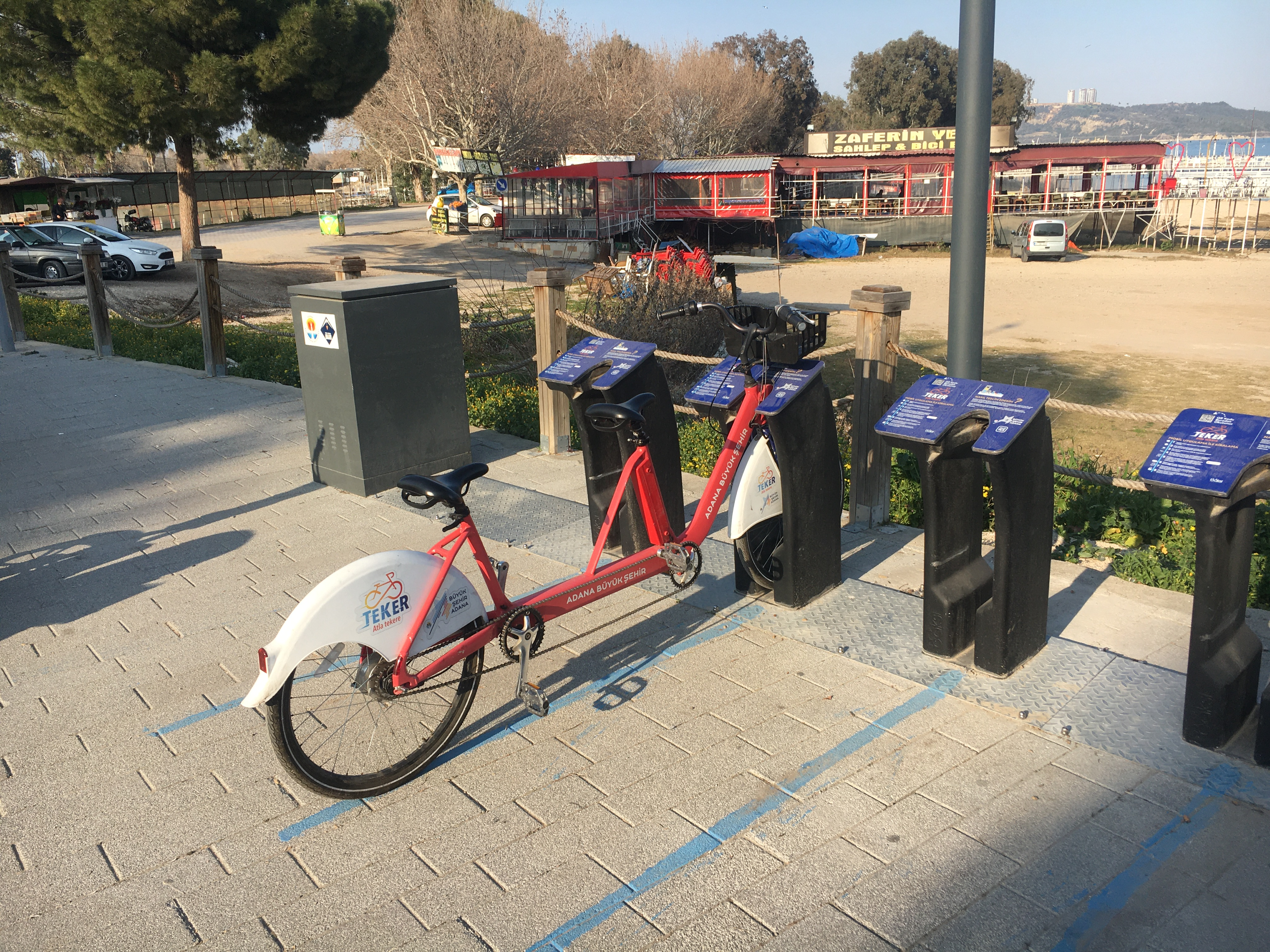
A Tandem type bike on the Menderes Island Station

Bus Services are using by all alongside of district and other districts. There are two types of bus services: The ones that owned by Adana Metropolitan Municipality (people buses), and the ones that partly controlled by the municipality (special people buses). People buses (known as Reds, Kırmızılar) is only accept bus cards (KentKart) for payment. But special people buses (known as Canlar) are also accept cash ^{(Probably Outdated)}.

Minibuses are serving the neighbourhoods and transport people to the city centre. It's accepting Card and Kentkart. There is a few minibus services serving the Çukurova: Topel, İtimat, Özen, Cemalpaşa, Denizli, Barkal, and Yeşilevler.

Rentable Bicycles also named Teker that you can rent with an app on your phone and ride around any of the Teker stations.

Currently there are 5 stations in Çukurova at Anatolian High School (ALA), Şehitler Boulevard (Formerly Kenan Evren Boulevard) - Turgut Özal Boulevard intersection, Menderes Island, Menderes Entrance and Iller Bank Intersection. There are 2 bike types (Regular, Tandem) and it costs 10₺ for every 30 minutes without opening fee.
