= Söğütlü, Çukurova =

Söğütlü
- Neighbourhood
- Location in Turkey
- Coordinates: 37.0622°N 35.1109°E
- Country: Turkey
- Province: Adana
- District: Çukurova
- Population (2022): 389
- Time zone: UTC+3 (TRT)

Söğütlü is a neighbourhood in the municipality and district of Çukurova, Adana Province, Turkey. Its population is 389 (2022). Before 2008, it was part of the district of Karaisalı.

== Geography ==
It is 33 km away from Adana city center and 19 km away from Çukurova district center.
