= Fatoş Gürkan =

Turkish politician (born 1966)

Personal details
- Born: January 1, 1966 (age 60) Adana, Turkey
- Party: Justice and Development Party (AKP)
- Occupation: Politician, Lawyer

Fatoş Gürkan (born 1 January 1966) is a Turkish lawyer and politician with the ruling AKP Party, Member of Parliament.

She was born in Çevlik, Adana. She graduated from Ankara University Law Faculty and worked as a freelance lawyer. She became member of TEMA foundation, Turkish Law Institute. She worked at Adana Bar Association's Child Commission and Culture and Tourism Commission. She is elected representative for Adana in the 23rd Turkish Parliament and is member of Constitution Commission Secretariat.
