= Memişli, Çukurova =

Memişli
- Neighbourhood
- Location in Turkey
- Coordinates: 37°06′N 35°13′E
- Country: Turkey
- Province: Adana
- District: Çukurova
- Population (2022): 60
- Time zone: UTC+3 (TRT)

Memişli is a neighbourhood in the municipality and district of Çukurova, Adana Province, Turkey. Its population is 60 (2022). Before 2008, it was part of the district of Karaisalı.
