= Küçükçınar, Çukurova =

Küçükçınar
- Neighbourhood
- Location in Turkey
- Coordinates: 37°05′33″N 35°01′40″E
- Country: Turkey
- Province: Adana
- District: Çukurova
- Population (2022): 181
- Time zone: UTC+3 (TRT)

Küçükçınar is a neighbourhood in the municipality and district of Çukurova, Adana Province, Turkey. Its population is 181 (2022). Before 2008, it was part of the district of Karaisalı.
