= Sarıkonak =

Sarıkonak can refer to:

- Sarıkonak, Bitlis
- Sarıkonak, İliç
- Sarıkonak, Karaisalı
