= Gökkuyu, Çukurova =

Gökkuyu
- Neighbourhood
- Location in Turkey
- Coordinates: 37°04′N 35°06′E
- Country: Turkey
- Province: Adana
- District: Çukurova
- Population (2022): 239
- Time zone: UTC+3 (TRT)

Gökkuyu is a neighbourhood in the municipality and district of Çukurova, Adana Province, Turkey. Its population is 239 (2022). Before 2008, it was part of the district of Karaisalı.
