= Koruklu =

Koruklu can refer to:

- Körüklü, Karaisalı
- Koruklu, Keşan
