= Merkez =

Merkez means "center" or "hub" in Turkish. It may refer to:

- The central districts of the Provinces of Turkey, often (but not always) bearing the same name as the province (e.g. Mersin is the central district of Mersin Province)
- Merkez Park, an urban park along the Seyhan River, in Adana, Turkey
- Merkezefendi, a planned district and second level municipality in Denizli Province, Turkey
- Merkezefendi Cemetery, in the Merkezefendi neighborhood, Zeytinburnu district, Istanbul, Turkey
