= 15 July Martyrs Bridge (Adana) =

15 July Martyrs Bridge 15 Temmuz Şehitler Köprüsü
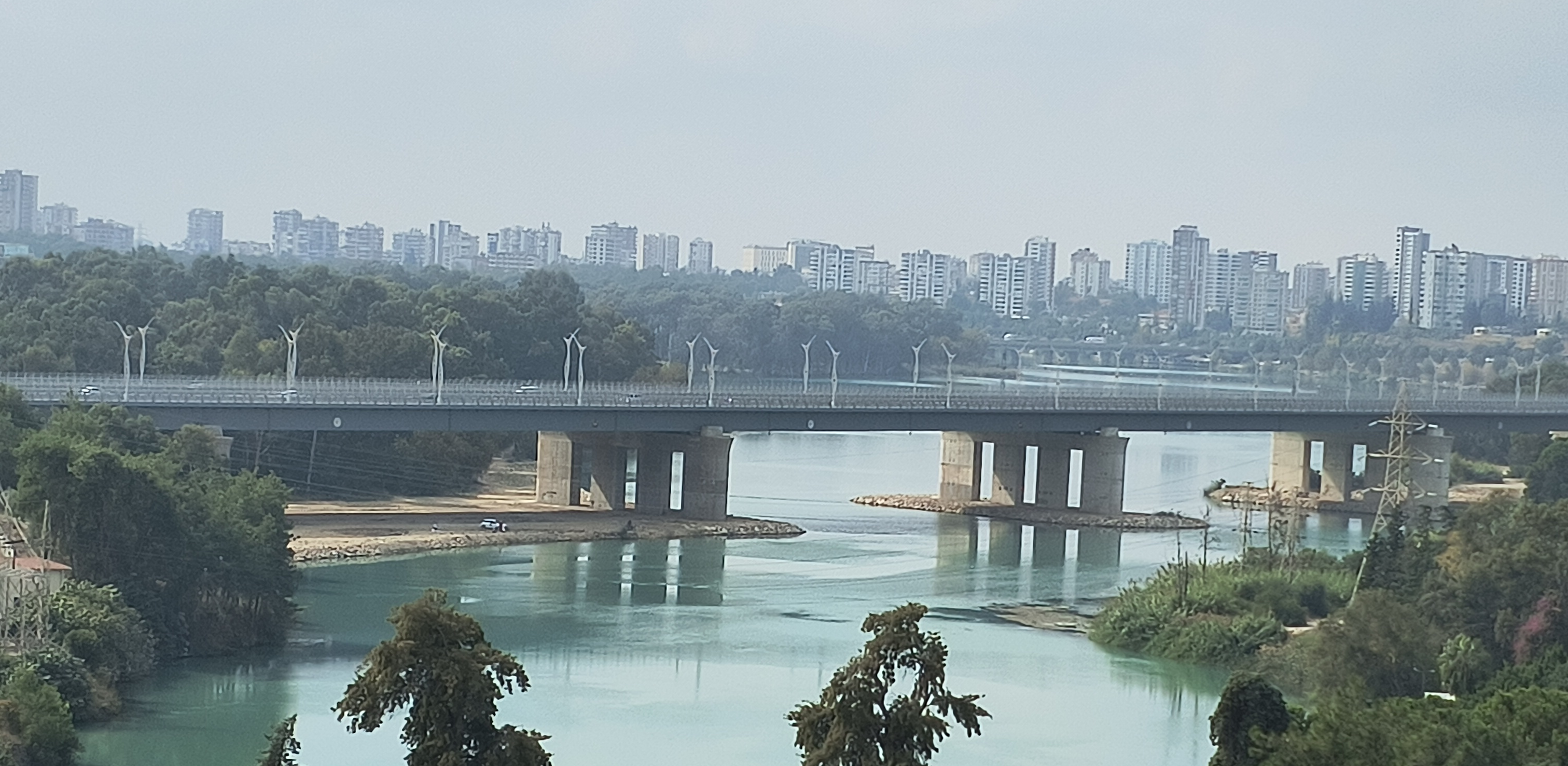
- Coordinates: 37°01′53″N 35°20′10″E
- Crosses: Seyhan River
- Locale: Çukurova-Sarıçam, Adana
- Official name: 15 July Martyrs Bridge

Characteristics
- Total length: 825 m (2,707 ft)
- Width: 40 m (130 ft)

History
- Construction start: 30 March 2016
- Construction cost: ₺ 120 million (approx. US$ 42.5 million as of March 2016)
- Opened: 28 April 2023

Statistics
- Daily traffic: 55,000–60,000

Location
- Interactive map of 15 July Martyrs Bridge

The 15 July Martyrs Bridge (Turkish: 15 Temmuz Şehitler Köprüsü) is a road bridge crossing the Seyhan River in Adana. The bridge connects Çukurova and Sarıçam districts.

The bridge has a length of 825 m (2,707 ft) and a width of 40 m (130 ft). It has three road lanes and one light railway line in each direction. It is projected that the bridge's daily traffic will be at 55,000–60,000 vehicles. The project's cost is budgeted at ₺ 120 million (approximately US$42.5 million as of March 2016).

The bridge is commissioned by the Metropolitan Municipality of Adana. The construction of the bridge began officially with the foundation stone-laying in a ceremony held on 30 March 2016. The bridge is then taken over by the Central Government's Ministry of Transportation. It has officially opened on 28 April 2023.
