= Kaşoba, Çukurova =

Kaşoba
- Neighbourhood
- Location in Turkey
- Coordinates: 37.1338°N 35.1784°E
- Country: Turkey
- Province: Adana
- District: Çukurova
- Population (2022): 350
- Time zone: UTC+3 (TRT)

Kaşoba is a neighbourhood in the municipality and district of Çukurova, Adana Province, Turkey. Its population is 350 (2022). Before 2008, it was part of the district of Karaisalı.
