= Örcün, Çukurova =

Örcün
- Neighbourhood
- Country: Turkey
- Province: Adana
- District: Çukurova
- Population (2022): 277
- Time zone: UTC+3 (TRT)

Örcün is a neighbourhood in the municipality and district of Çukurova, Adana Province, Turkey. Its population is 277 (2022). Before 2008, it was part of the district of Karaisalı.
