= Pirili, Çukurova =

Pirili
- Neighbourhood
- Location in Turkey
- Coordinates: 37.1189°N 35.1355°E
- Country: Turkey
- Province: Adana
- District: Çukurova
- Population (2022): 468
- Time zone: UTC+3 (TRT)

Pirili is a neighbourhood in the municipality and district of Çukurova, Adana Province, Turkey. Its population is 468 (2022). Before 2008, it was part of the district of Karaisalı.
