= Maraşlı =

Maraşlı may refer to:

== Places ==
=== Turkey ===
- Maraşlı, Çaykara
- Maraşlı, Karaisalı

== Arts, entertainment, and media ==
=== Television ===
- Maraşlı (2021 TV series), a Turkish show
