= Bozcalar, Çukurova =

Bozcalar
- Neighbourhood
- Location in Turkey
- Coordinates: 37°07′N 35°01′E
- Country: Turkey
- Province: Adana
- District: Çukurova
- Population (2022): 159
- Time zone: UTC+3 (TRT)

Bozcalar is a neighbourhood in the municipality and district of Çukurova, Adana Province, Turkey. Its population is 159 (2022). Before 2008, it was part of the district of Karaisalı.

== Geography ==
It is 50 km away from Adana city center and 36 km away from Çukurova district center.
