= Çorlu (disambiguation) =

Çorlu is a district in Tekirdağ Province, Turkey.

Çorlu may also refer to:

== People ==
- Çorlulu Ali Pasha (1670–1711), Ottoman grand vizier
- Nilüfer Çınar Çorlulu (born 1962), Turkish Woman International Master of chess
- Şenol Çorlu (born 1958), retired Turkish football player

== Places ==
- Çorlu, Karaisalı, a village in Karaisalı district of Adana Province, Turkey
- Lernantsk, formerly Chorlu, a town in Lori Province of Armenia

== Other uses ==
- Tekirdağ Çorlu Airport, a regional airport in Çorlu, tekirdağ, Turkey
