= Dörtler, Çukurova =

Dörtler
- Neighbourhood
- Location in Turkey
- Coordinates: 37°06′N 35°15′E
- Country: Turkey
- Province: Adana
- District: Çukurova
- Population (2022): 897
- Time zone: UTC+3 (TRT)

Dörtler is a neighbourhood in the municipality and district of Çukurova, Adana Province, Turkey. Its population is 897 (2022). Before 2008, it was part of the district of Karaisalı.
