= Durak, Karaisalı =

Durak
- Neighbourhood
- Location in Turkey
- Coordinates: 37.1520°N 34.9740°E
- Country: Turkey
- Province: Adana
- District: Karaisalı
- Population (2022): 207
- Time zone: UTC+3 (TRT)

Durak is a neighbourhood in the municipality and district of Karaisalı, Adana Province, Turkey. Its population is 207 (2022).
