= Çatalan, Karaisalı =

Çatalan
- Neighbourhood
- Location in Turkey
- Coordinates: 37.2486°N 35.2911°E
- Country: Turkey
- Province: Adana
- District: Karaisalı
- Population (2022): 337
- Time zone: UTC+3 (TRT)

Çatalan is a neighbourhood in the municipality and district of Karaisalı, Adana Province, Turkey. Its population is 337 (2022). It was an independent municipality until it was merged into the municipality of Karaisalı in 2008.
