= Akçalı, Karaisalı =

Akçalı
- Neighbourhood
- Location in Turkey
- Coordinates: 37.193°N 35.174°E
- Country: Turkey
- Province: Adana
- District: Karaisalı
- Population (2022): 74
- Time zone: UTC+3 (TRT)

Akçalı is a neighbourhood in the municipality and district of Karaisalı, Adana Province, Turkey. Its population is 74 (2022).
