= Salbaş Esentepe =

- Neighbourhood
- Location in Turkey
- Coordinates: 37°06′37″N 35°06′44″E
- Country: Turkey
- Province: Adana
- District: Çukurova
- Population (2022): 499
- Time zone: UTC+3 (TRT)

Salbaş Esentepe is a neighbourhood in the municipality and district of Çukurova, Adana Province, Turkey. Its population is 499 (2022). Before 2008, it was part of the district of Seyhan.
