= Çakallı, Karaisalı =

Çakallı
- Neighbourhood
- Location in Turkey
- Coordinates: 37.1914°N 35.1078°E
- Country: Turkey
- Province: Adana
- District: Karaisalı
- Population (2022): 436
- Time zone: UTC+3 (TRT)

Çakallı is a neighbourhood in the municipality and district of Karaisalı, Adana Province, Turkey. Its population is 436 (2022).

== Geography ==
It is 40 km away from Adana and 10 km away from Karaisalı district

== Demographics ==
Neighborhood population data by years
Year	Population
2022	436
2007	600
2000	496
1997	518
