= Sadıkali, Karaisalı =

Sadıkali
- Neighbourhood
- Location in Turkey
- Coordinates: 37°11′33″N 35°15′07″E
- Country: Turkey
- Province: Adana
- District: Karaisalı
- Population (2022): 158
- Time zone: UTC+3 (TRT)

Sadıkali is a neighbourhood in the municipality and district of Karaisalı, Adana Province, Turkey. Its population is 158 (2022).
