= Bekirli, Karaisalı =

Bekirli
- Neighbourhood
- Location in Turkey
- Coordinates: 37.2411°N 35.2006°E
- Country: Turkey
- Province: Adana
- District: Karaisalı
- Population (2022): 400
- Time zone: UTC+3 (TRT)

Bekirli is a neighbourhood in the municipality and district of Karaisalı, Adana Province, Turkey. Its population is 400 (2022).
