= Etekli, Karaisalı =

Etekli
- Neighbourhood
- Location in Turkey
- Coordinates: 37°25′N 35°14′E
- Country: Turkey
- Province: Adana
- District: Karaisalı
- Population (2022): 627
- Time zone: UTC+3 (TRT)

Etekli is a neighbourhood in the municipality and district of Karaisalı, Adana Province, Turkey. Its population is 627 (2022).
