= Karahan, Çukurova =

Karahan
- Neighbourhood
- Location in Turkey
- Coordinates: 37.0552°N 35.1740°E
- Country: Turkey
- Province: Adana
- District: Çukurova
- Population (2022): 1,851
- Time zone: UTC+3 (TRT)

Karahan is a neighbourhood in the municipality and district of Çukurova, Adana Province, Turkey. Its population is 1,851 (2022). Before 2008, it was part of the district of Seyhan.
