= Hacımusalı, Karaisalı =

Hacımusalı
- Neighbourhood
- Location in Turkey
- Coordinates: 37.3114°N 35.2761°E
- Country: Turkey
- Province: Adana
- District: Karaisalı
- Population (2022): 623
- Time zone: UTC+3 (TRT)

Hacımusalı is a neighbourhood in the municipality and district of Karaisalı, Adana Province, Turkey. Its population is 623 (2022).
