= Kurttepe =

- Neighbourhood
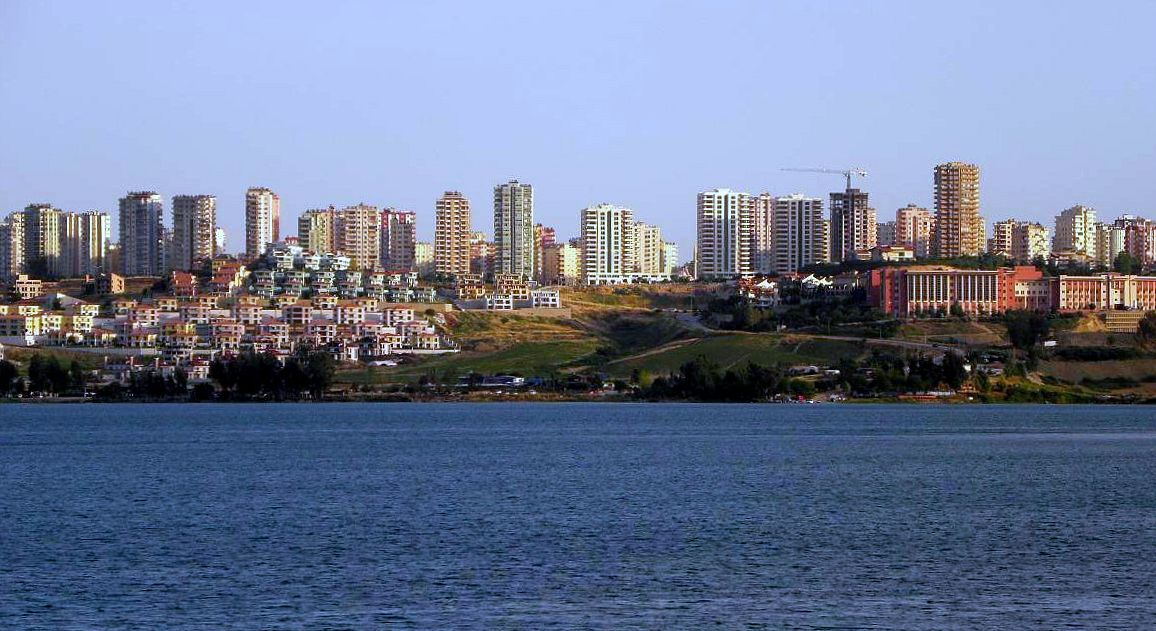
- Kurttepe from the lake

- Location within Turkey
- Coordinates: 37°03′31″N 35°16′00″E
- Country: Turkey
- Province: Adana
- District: Çukurova

Government
  - Muhtar: Bekir İşlek
- Elevation: 140 m (460 ft)
- Population (2022): 6,978
- Time zone: UTC+3 (TRT)
- Area code: 0322

Kurttepe is a neighbourhood in the municipality and district of Çukurova, Adana Province, Turkey. Its population is 6,978 (2022). Before 2008, it was part of the district of Seyhan. The neighborhood is located at north end of the city, at the shores of Seyhan Lake.

== Governance ==
Kurttepe is a mahalle and it is administered by the Muhtar and the Seniors Council.

== Economy ==
Kurttepe is former village which annexed to the city as a mahalle, after the expansion of the city to the north. Major institution in the neighborhood is the Tüyap Exhibition Hall and the Seyhan Research Hospital.

== Transport ==
Adana Metro Anadolu Lisesi station (alternatively known as Kurttepe station) is one kilometer south of the mahalle.

Adana Metropolitan Municipality Bus Department (ABBO) has bus routes from downtown Adana to the Seyhan Research Hospital within the Kurttepe neighborhood. Bus #159 is a 35-minute interval service that connects Kurttepe to the Central railway station, old town and to the Şakirpaşa Airport .
