= Yazıbaşı, Karaisalı =

Yazıbaşı
- Neighbourhood
- Location in Turkey
- Coordinates: 37°10′57″N 35°11′29″E
- Country: Turkey
- Province: Adana
- District: Karaisalı
- Population (2022): 174
- Time zone: UTC+3 (TRT)

Yazıbaşı is a neighbourhood in the municipality and district of Karaisalı, Adana Province, Turkey. Its population is 174 (2022).
