= Torunsolaklı, Karaisalı =

Torunsolaklı
- Neighbourhood
- Location in Turkey
- Coordinates: 37°18′N 35°14′E
- Country: Turkey
- Province: Adana
- District: Karaisalı
- Population (2022): 729
- Time zone: UTC+3 (TRT)

Torunsolaklı is a neighbourhood in the municipality and district of Karaisalı, Adana Province, Turkey. Its population is 729 (2022).
