= Kocaveliler, Karaisalı =

Kocaveliler
- Neighbourhood
- Country: Turkey
- Province: Adana
- District: Karaisalı
- Population (2022): 211
- Time zone: UTC+3 (TRT)

Kocaveliler is a neighbourhood in the municipality and district of Karaisalı, Adana Province, Turkey. Its population is 211 (2022).
