= Kırıklı, Karaisalı =

Kırıklı
- Neighbourhood
- Location in Turkey
- Coordinates: 37.1805°N 35.2288°E
- Country: Turkey
- Province: Adana
- District: Karaisalı
- Population (2022): 582
- Time zone: UTC+3 (TRT)

Kırıklı is a neighbourhood in the municipality and district of Karaisalı, Adana Province, Turkey. Its population was 582 as of 2022.
