= Gökhasanlı, Karaisalı =

Gökhasanlı
- Neighbourhood
- Location in Turkey
- Coordinates: 37°15′N 35°09′E
- Country: Turkey
- Province: Adana
- District: Karaisalı
- Population (2022): 162
- Time zone: UTC+3 (TRT)

Gökhasanlı is a neighbourhood in the municipality and district of Karaisalı, Adana Province, Turkey. Its population is 162 (2022).
