= Ömerli, Karaisalı =

Ömerli
- Neighbourhood
- Location in Turkey
- Coordinates: 37°16′58″N 35°19′54″E
- Country: Turkey
- Province: Adana
- District: Karaisalı
- Population (2022): 127
- Time zone: UTC+3 (TRT)

Ömerli is a neighbourhood in the municipality and district of Karaisalı, Adana Province, Turkey. Its population is 127 (2022).
