= Esentepe, Çukurova =

Esentepe
- Neighbourhood
- Location in Turkey
- Coordinates: 37°02′32″N 35°13′40″E
- Country: Turkey
- Province: Adana
- District: Çukurova
- Population (2022): 1,811
- Time zone: UTC+3 (TRT)

Esentepe (formerly: Çakalkuyusu) is a neighbourhood in the municipality and district of Çukurova, Adana Province, Turkey. Its population is 1,811 (2022). Before 2008, it was part of the district of Seyhan.
