= Barakdağı, Karaisalı =

Barakdağı
- Neighbourhood
- Location in Turkey
- Coordinates: 37°24′N 35°12′E
- Country: Turkey
- Province: Adana
- District: Karaisalı
- Population (2022): 313
- Time zone: UTC+3 (TRT)

Barakdağı is a neighbourhood in the municipality and district of Karaisalı, Adana Province, Turkey. Its population is 313 (2022).
