= Yüzüncüyıl, Çukurova =

Yüzüncüyıl
- Neighbourhood
- Location in Turkey
- Coordinates: 37°2′36″N 35°14′56″E
- Country: Turkey
- Province: Adana
- District: Çukurova
- Population (2022): 45,476
- Time zone: UTC+3 (TRT)

Yüzüncüyıl (also: 100. Yıl, formerly: Kireçocağı) is a neighbourhood in the municipality and district of Çukurova, Adana Province, Turkey. Its population is 45,476 (2022). Before 2008, it was part of the district of Seyhan.
