= Eğlence, Karaisalı =

Eğlence
- Neighbourhood
- Location in Turkey
- Coordinates: 37.2949°N 35.2085°E
- Country: Turkey
- Province: Adana
- District: Karaisalı
- Population (2022): 381
- Time zone: UTC+3 (TRT)

Eğlence is a neighbourhood in the municipality and district of Karaisalı, Adana Province, Turkey. Its population is 381 (2022).
