= Tümenli, Karaisalı =

Tümenli
- Neighbourhood
- Location in Turkey
- Coordinates: 37°22′N 35°22′E
- Country: Turkey
- Province: Adana
- District: Karaisalı
- Population (2022): 291
- Time zone: UTC+3 (TRT)

Tümenli is a neighbourhood in the municipality and district of Karaisalı, Adana Province, Turkey. Its population is 291 (2022).
