= Aktaş, Karaisalı =

Aktaş
- Neighbourhood
- Location in Turkey
- Coordinates: 37.2680°N 35.0762°E
- Country: Turkey
- Province: Adana
- District: Karaisalı
- Population (2022): 94
- Time zone: UTC+3 (TRT)

Aktaş is a neighbourhood in the municipality and district of Karaisalı, Adana Province, Turkey. Its population is 94 (2022).
