= Beydemir, Karaisalı =

Beydemir
- Neighbourhood
- Location in Turkey
- Coordinates: 37.2746°N 35.1413°E
- Country: Turkey
- Province: Adana
- District: Karaisalı
- Population (2022): 403
- Time zone: UTC+3 (TRT)

Beydemir is a neighbourhood in the municipality and district of Karaisalı, Adana Province, Turkey. Its population is 403 (2022).
