= Karslılar, Çukurova =

Karslılar
- Neighbourhood
- Location in Turkey
- Coordinates: 37°04′N 35°18′E
- Country: Turkey
- Province: Adana
- District: Çukurova
- Population (2022): 5,172
- Time zone: UTC+3 (TRT)

Karslılar (formerly: Karslı) is a neighbourhood in the municipality and district of Çukurova, Adana Province, Turkey. Its population is 5,172 (2022). Before 2008, it was part of the district of Seyhan.
