= Hacılı, Karaisalı =

Hacılı
- Neighbourhood
- Location in Turkey
- Coordinates: 37.2968°N 35.1552°E
- Country: Turkey
- Province: Adana
- District: Karaisalı
- Population (2022): 341
- Time zone: UTC+3 (TRT)

Hacılı is a neighbourhood in the municipality and district of Karaisalı, Adana Province, Turkey. Its population is 341 (2022).
