= Kuzgun, Karaisalı =

Kuzgun
- Neighbourhood
- Location in Turkey
- Coordinates: 37.1429°N 35.0934°E
- Country: Turkey
- Province: Adana
- District: Karaisalı
- Population (2022): 437
- Time zone: UTC+3 (TRT)

Kuzgun is a neighbourhood in the municipality and district of Karaisalı, Adana Province, Turkey. Its population is 437 (2022).
