= Aşağıyörükler, Karaisalı =

Aşağıyörükler
- Neighbourhood
- Location in Turkey
- Coordinates: 37.2789°N 35.0644°E
- Country: Turkey
- Province: Adana
- District: Karaisalı
- Population (2022): 97
- Time zone: UTC+3 (TRT)

Aşağıyörükler is a neighbourhood in the municipality and district of Karaisalı, Adana Province, Turkey. Its population is 97 (2022).
