= Bucak, Karaisalı =

Bucak
- Neighbourhood
- Location in Turkey
- Coordinates: 37.1931°N 34.9421°E
- Country: Turkey
- Province: Adana
- District: Karaisalı
- Population (2022): 303
- Time zone: UTC+3 (TRT)

Bucak is a neighbourhood in the municipality and district of Karaisalı, Adana Province, Turkey. Its population is 303 (2022).
