= Kıralan, Karaisalı =

Kıralan
- Neighbourhood
- Location within Turkey
- Coordinates: 37.2543°N 34.9804°E
- Country: Turkey
- Province: Adana
- District: Karaisalı
- Population (2022): 148
- Time zone: UTC+3 (TRT)

Kıralan, also known as Hacıkırı, is a neighbourhood in the municipality and district of Karaisalı, Adana Province, Turkey. Its population was 148 in 2022. The village is inhabited by the Tahtacı.
