= Başkıf, Karaisalı =

Başkıf
- Neighbourhood
- Location in Turkey
- Coordinates: 37°16′N 35°07′E
- Country: Turkey
- Province: Adana
- District: Karaisalı
- Population (2022): 181
- Time zone: UTC+3 (TRT)

Başkıf is a neighbourhood in the municipality and district of Karaisalı, Adana Province, Turkey. Its population is 181 (2022).
