= Çocuklar, Karaisalı =

Çocuklar
- Neighbourhood
- Location in Turkey
- Coordinates: 37°14′N 35°10′E
- Country: Turkey
- Province: Adana
- District: Karaisalı
- Population (2022): 131
- Time zone: UTC+3 (TRT)

Çocuklar is a neighbourhood in the municipality and district of Karaisalı, Adana Province, Turkey. Its population is 131 (2022).
