= Karakuyu, Karaisalı =

Karakuyu
- Neighbourhood
- Location in Turkey
- Coordinates: 37.1412°N 35.1293°E
- Country: Turkey
- Province: Adana
- District: Karaisalı
- Population (2022): 51
- Time zone: UTC+3 (TRT)

Karakuyu is a neighbourhood in the municipality and district of Karaisalı, Adana Province, Turkey. As of 2022, it had a population of 51.
