= Boztahta, Karaisalı =

Boztahta
- Neighbourhood
- Location within Turkey
- Coordinates: 37.3831°N 35.2142°E
- Country: Turkey
- Province: Adana
- District: Karaisalı
- Population (2022): 358
- Time zone: UTC+3 (TRT)

Boztahta (also: Merkezboztahta) is a neighbourhood in the municipality and district of Karaisalı, Adana Province, Turkey. Its population is 358 (2022).
