= Kabasakal =

- Neighbourhood
- Location in Turkey
- Coordinates: 37°03′N 35°13′E
- Country: Turkey
- Province: Adana
- District: Çukurova
- Elevation: 130 m (430 ft)
- Population (2022): 1,625
- Time zone: UTC+3 (TRT)

Kabasakal is a neighbourhood of the municipality and district of Çukurova, Adana Province, Turkey. Its population is 1,625 (2022). Before 2008, it was part of the district of Seyhan. It is at the northwest of the city of Adana, the distance between the village and the city center being only 10 kilometres (6.2 mi) and it has almost merged with the city. The city cemetery of Adana (Turkish: Kabasakal mezarlığı) is about 1.5 kilometres (0.93 mi) west of Kabasakal.
