= Nergizlik, Karaisalı =

Nergizlik
- Neighbourhood
- Location in Turkey
- Coordinates: 37°18′25″N 35°02′27″E
- Country: Turkey
- Province: Adana
- District: Karaisalı
- Population (2022): 202
- Time zone: UTC+3 (TRT)

Nergizlik is a neighbourhood in the municipality and district of Karaisalı, Adana Province, Turkey. Its population is 202 (2022). The village is inhabited by Tahtacı.
