= Altınova, Karaisalı =

Altınova
- Neighbourhood
- Location in Turkey
- Coordinates: 37.1905°N 35.0231°E
- Country: Turkey
- Province: Adana
- District: Karaisalı
- Population (2022): 237
- Time zone: UTC+3 (TRT)

Altınova is a neighbourhood in the municipality and district of Karaisalı, Adana Province, Turkey. Its population is 237 (2022).
