= Güvenç, Karaisalı =

Güvenç
- Neighbourhood
- Location in Turkey
- Coordinates: 37.2284°N 35.0760°E
- Country: Turkey
- Province: Adana
- District: Karaisalı
- Population (2022): 290
- Time zone: UTC+3 (TRT)

Güvenç is a neighbourhood in the municipality and district of Karaisalı, Adana Province, Turkey. Its population is 290 (2022).
