= Nuhlu, Karaisalı =

Nuhlu
- Neighbourhood
- Location in Turkey
- Coordinates: 37°20′N 35°20′E
- Country: Turkey
- Province: Adana
- District: Karaisalı
- Population (2022): 128
- Time zone: UTC+3 (TRT)

Nuhlu is a neighbourhood in the municipality and district of Karaisalı, Adana Province, Turkey. Its population is 128 (2022).
