= Gülüşlü, Karaisalı =

Gülüşlü
- Neighbourhood
- Location in Turkey
- Coordinates: 37°17′N 35°01′E
- Country: Turkey
- Province: Adana
- District: Karaisalı
- Population (2022): 93
- Time zone: UTC+3 (TRT)

Gülüşlü is a neighbourhood in the municipality and district of Karaisalı, Adana Province, Turkey. Its population is 93 (2022).
