= Aşağıbelemedik, Karaisalı =

Aşağıbelemedik
- Neighbourhood
- Location in Turkey
- Coordinates: 37°16′N 35°02′E
- Country: Turkey
- Province: Adana
- District: Karaisalı
- Population (2022): 53
- Time zone: UTC+3 (TRT)

Aşağıbelemedik is a neighbourhood in the municipality and district of Karaisalı, Adana Province, Turkey. Its population is 53 (2022).

== Population ==
Historical population
Year	Pop.	±% p.a.
1985	137	—
1990	156	+2.63%
1997	121	−3.56%
2007	76	−4.54%
2012	66	−2.78%
2017	52	−4.66%
2022	53	+0.38%
Source: 1985 census, 1990 census, 1997 census and TÜIK (2007-2022)

== Geography ==
The village is 55 km from Adana and 5 km from the Karaisalı district.
