= Topaktaş, Karaisalı =

Topaktaş
- Neighbourhood
- Location in Turkey
- Coordinates: 37°10′00″N 35°10′30″E
- Country: Turkey
- Province: Adana
- District: Karaisalı
- Population (2022): 146
- Time zone: UTC+3 (TRT)

Topaktaş is a neighbourhood in the municipality and district of Karaisalı, Adana Province, Turkey. Its population is 146 (2022).
