= Gildirli, Karaisalı =

Gildirli
- Neighbourhood
- Location in Turkey
- Coordinates: 37°22′N 35°03′E
- Country: Turkey
- Province: Adana
- District: Karaisalı
- Population (2022): 159
- Time zone: UTC+3 (TRT)

Gildirli is a neighbourhood in the municipality and district of Karaisalı, Adana Province, Turkey. Its population is 159 (2022).
