= Merkez Park =

Park in Adana, Turkey

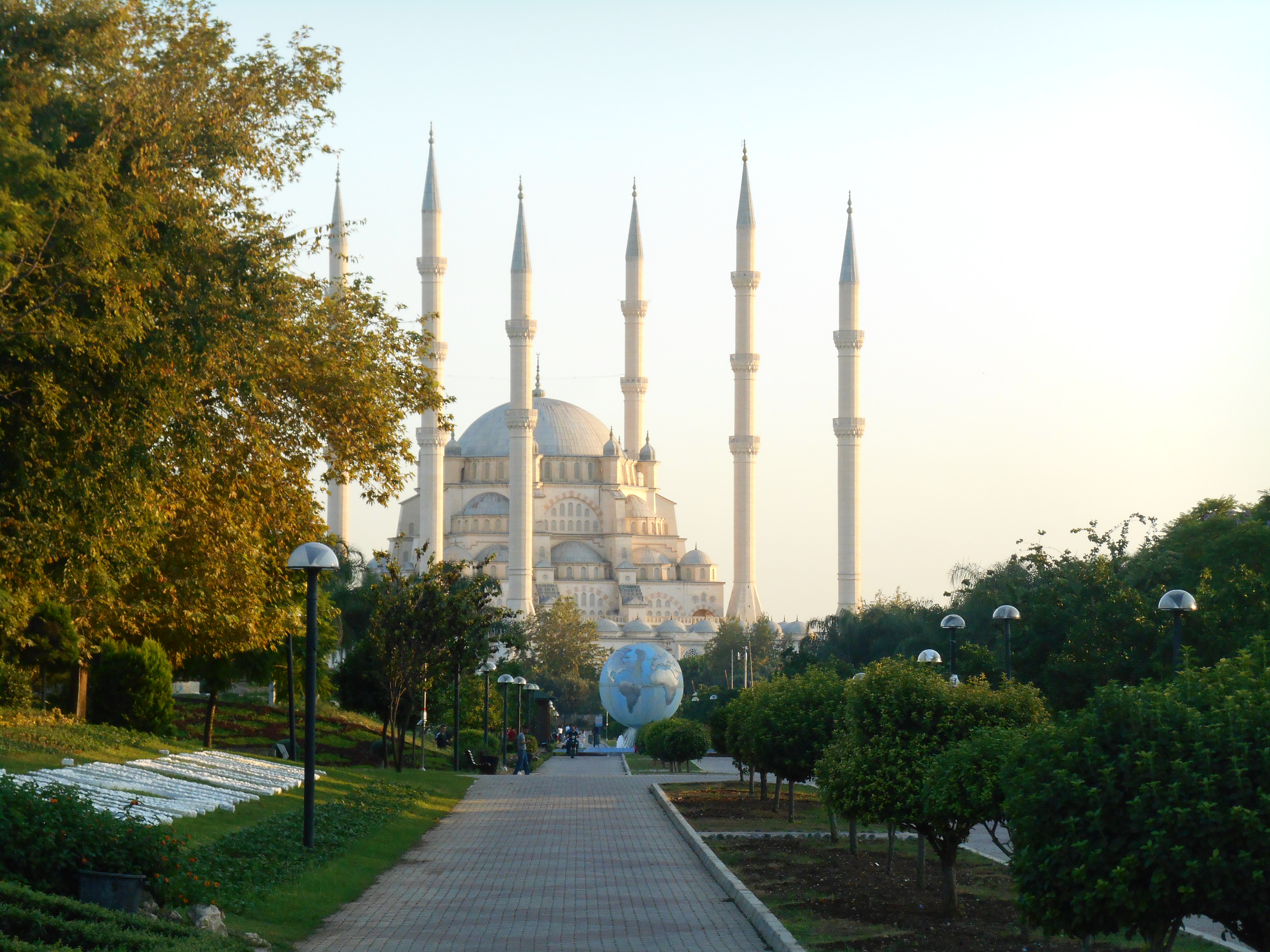
- Central pathway at the Merkez Park
- Interactive map of Merkez Park
- Type: Urban park
- Location: Adana, Turkey
- Coordinates: 36°59′44″N 35°20′06″E
- Area: 33 ha (82 acres)
- Created: 2004
- Operator: Adana Metropolitan Municipality
- Status: Open all year

Merkez Park (English: Central Park) is a 33-hectare (82-acre) urban park that is located on both banks of the Seyhan River in Adana. The larger portion of the park, 30 hectares (74 acres), is on the west bank.

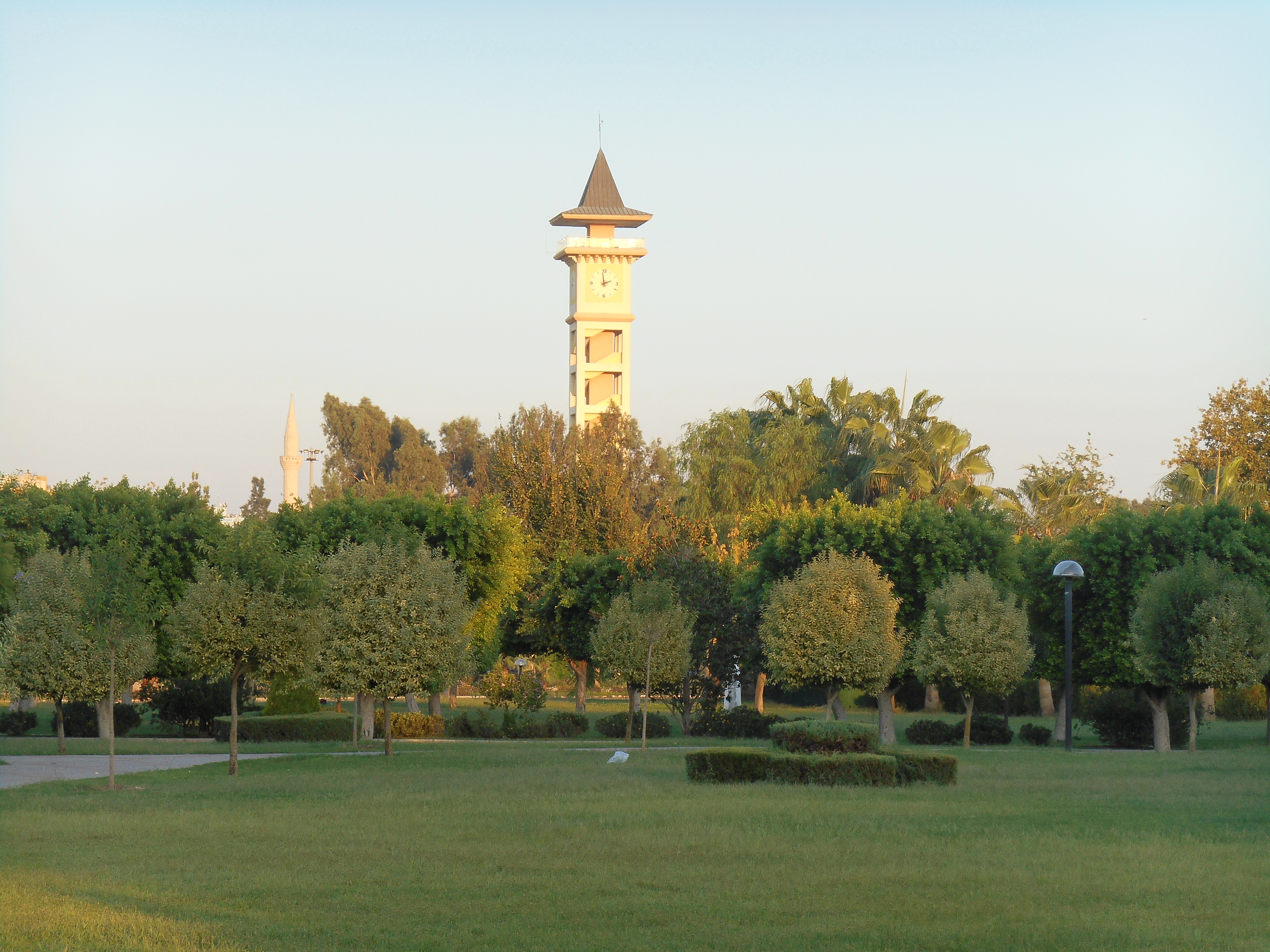
Clock tower in the park

Merkez Park starts just north of Sabancı Mosque and extends north to Galleria Shopping Mall. On the west of the park there is Fuzuli Street. On the east bank, the park starts north of the Sheraton Hotel (under construction) and extends north to the Acqualand Entertainment Center. On the east, the park is bordered with Hacı Sabancı Boulevard. Sinanpaşa and Yavuzlar footbridges connect both sections of the park.

== History ==
A large portion of the area of the west bank of today's Merkez Park was a citrus garden. South of the garden, there was a neighborhood of shanty homes. At the very south, just north of D-400 State road, there was the Central Bus Terminal on the river side, and the Archaeology Museum (which is still there) and a gas station on the street side. North of the garden up to the old dam, was a reserve land for floods which used to happen frequently until the 1950s. On the east bank, there was a neighborhood of shanty homes and a large area of vacant land.

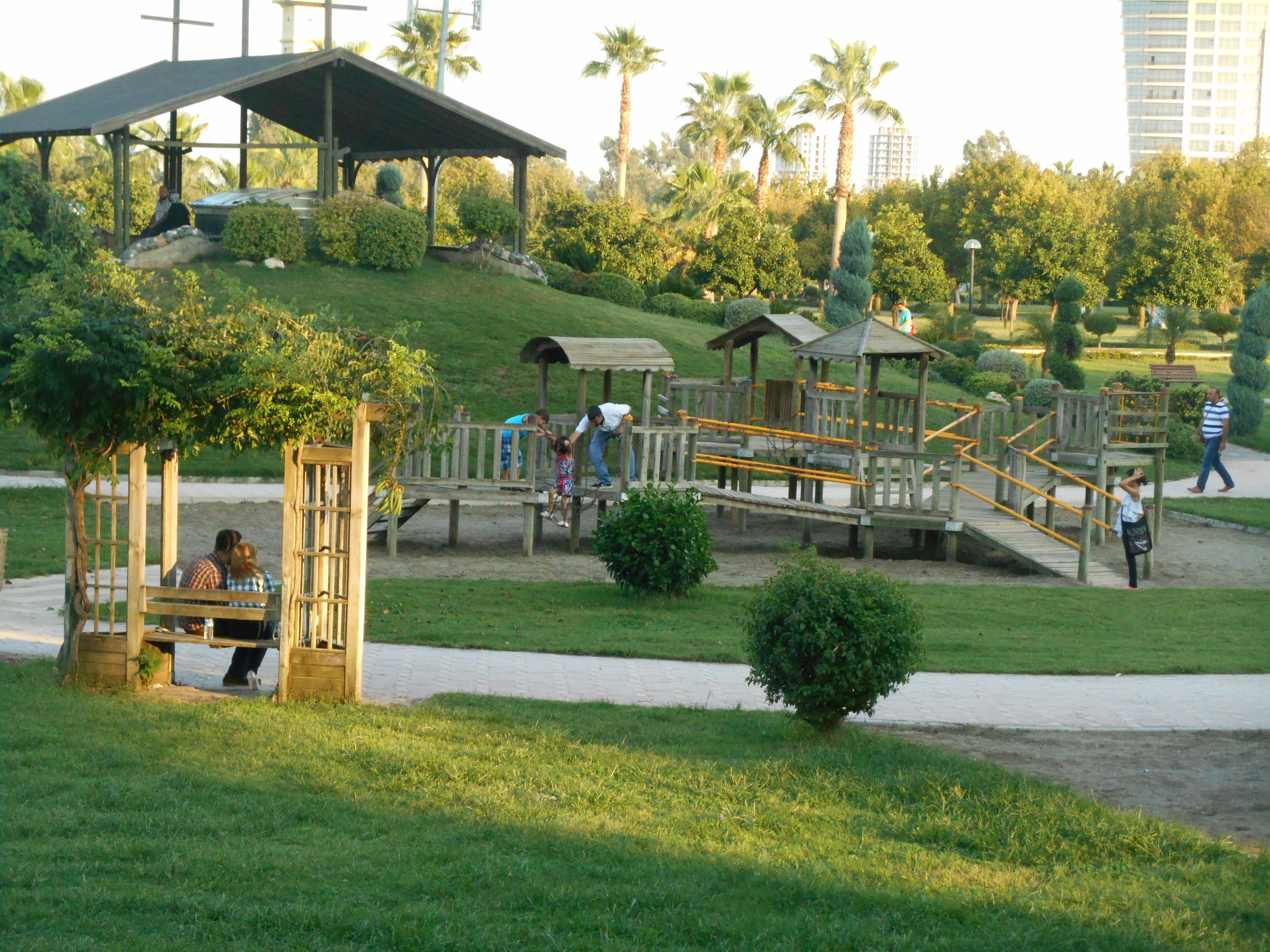
Children's playground

The idea to create a large urban park on the banks of the Seyhan River was first included in the city plan in 1988 by the mayor, Aytaç Durak. Named Merkez Park, it was planned to be built in an area from north of D-400 State road to the old dam. The project was presented to the public at the art gallery of the Municipal Hall. The first step to take was to relocate the Central Bus Terminal which was just north of D-400 State road. The Central Bus Terminal was moved to the west end of the city.

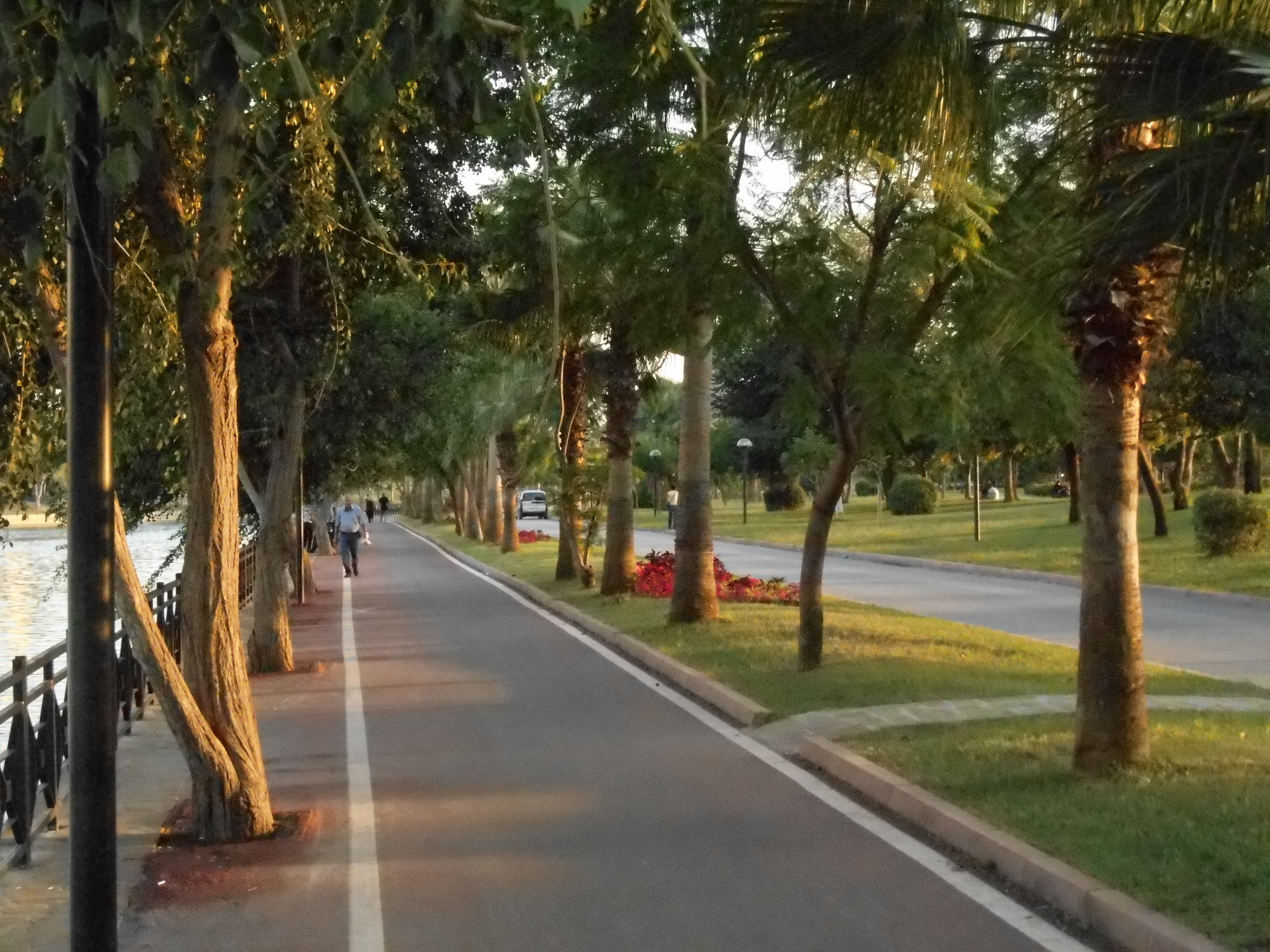
Cycling path

At the 1989 local elections, Selahattin Çolak was elected mayor, and he reversed the project. Although river banks are zoned as construction-free areas by laws, a large shopping mall was approved for the area just south of the Demirköprü bridge. On the area north of Demirköprü, Selahattin Çolak built a large amphitheater, named Mimar Sinan Amphitheater.

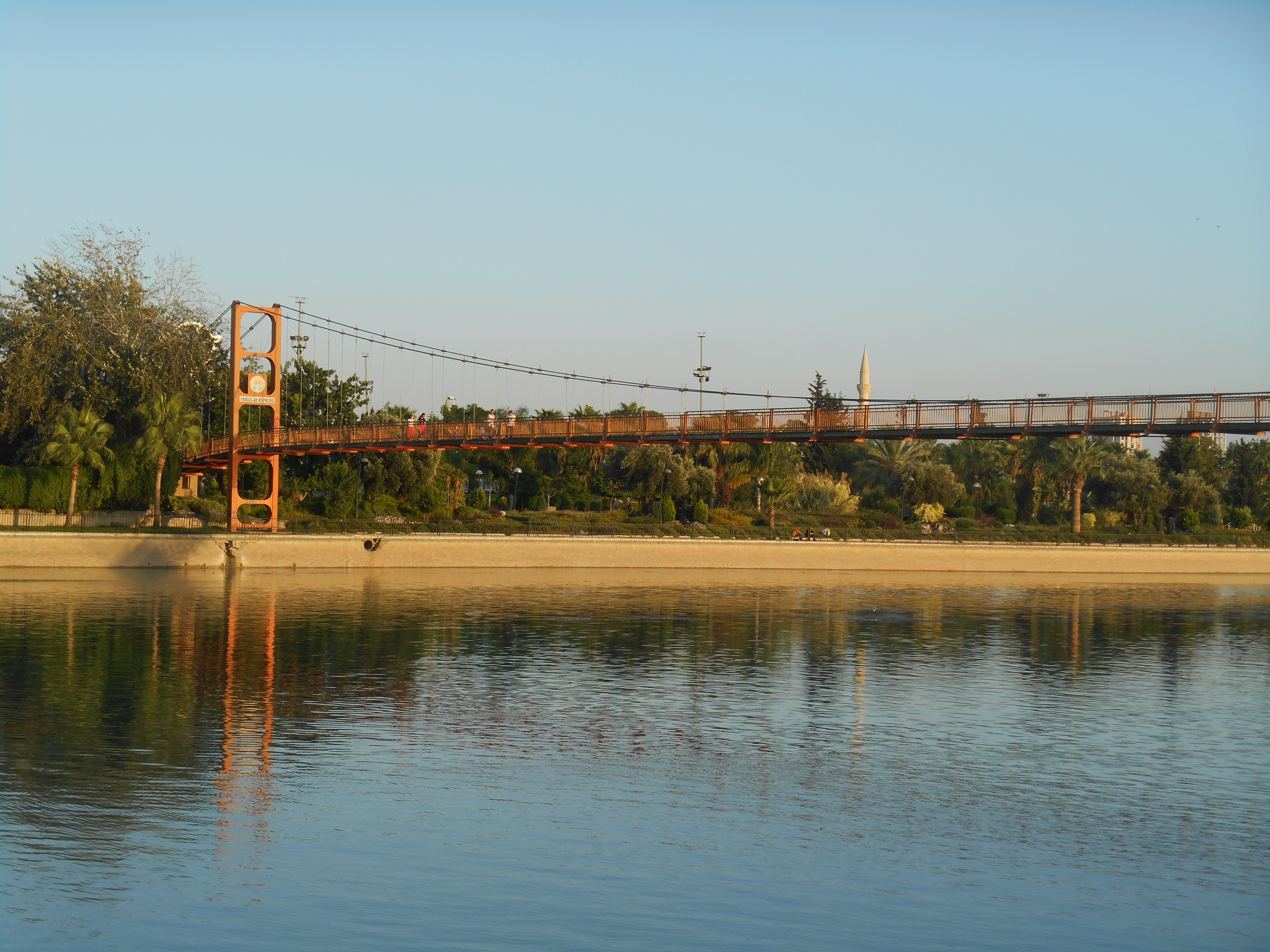
Footbridge over the Seyhan River, connecting the two sections of the park

At the 1994 local elections, Aytaç Durak was elected mayor for a second term. He had to modify the original plan of Merkez Park due to the constructions in the project area. The modified project resumed by re-zoning the neighborhood within the project area. There were around 100 homes in the area and demolition of the homes started in 1998. During this period, the Sinanpaşa footbridge was built to connect both banks of the Seyhan River. Sabancı Mosque, at the corner of Seyhan bridge, was completed in 1998.

Before the construction of Merkez Park, a citywide recreational pathway was completed on both banks of the Seyhan River. Park construction started by building the major pathway of the park from Galleria to Sabancı Mosque. Citrus trees were completely removed and converted into multi-functional green areas. The gas station next to the Archaeology Museum was moved to another location and the park was extended towards Sabancı Mosque. An underground car park was built at the area between Sabancı Mosque and the museum. The ground was set as green area. The construction of the west bank of the park was fully completed in 2008.

== Landscaping ==
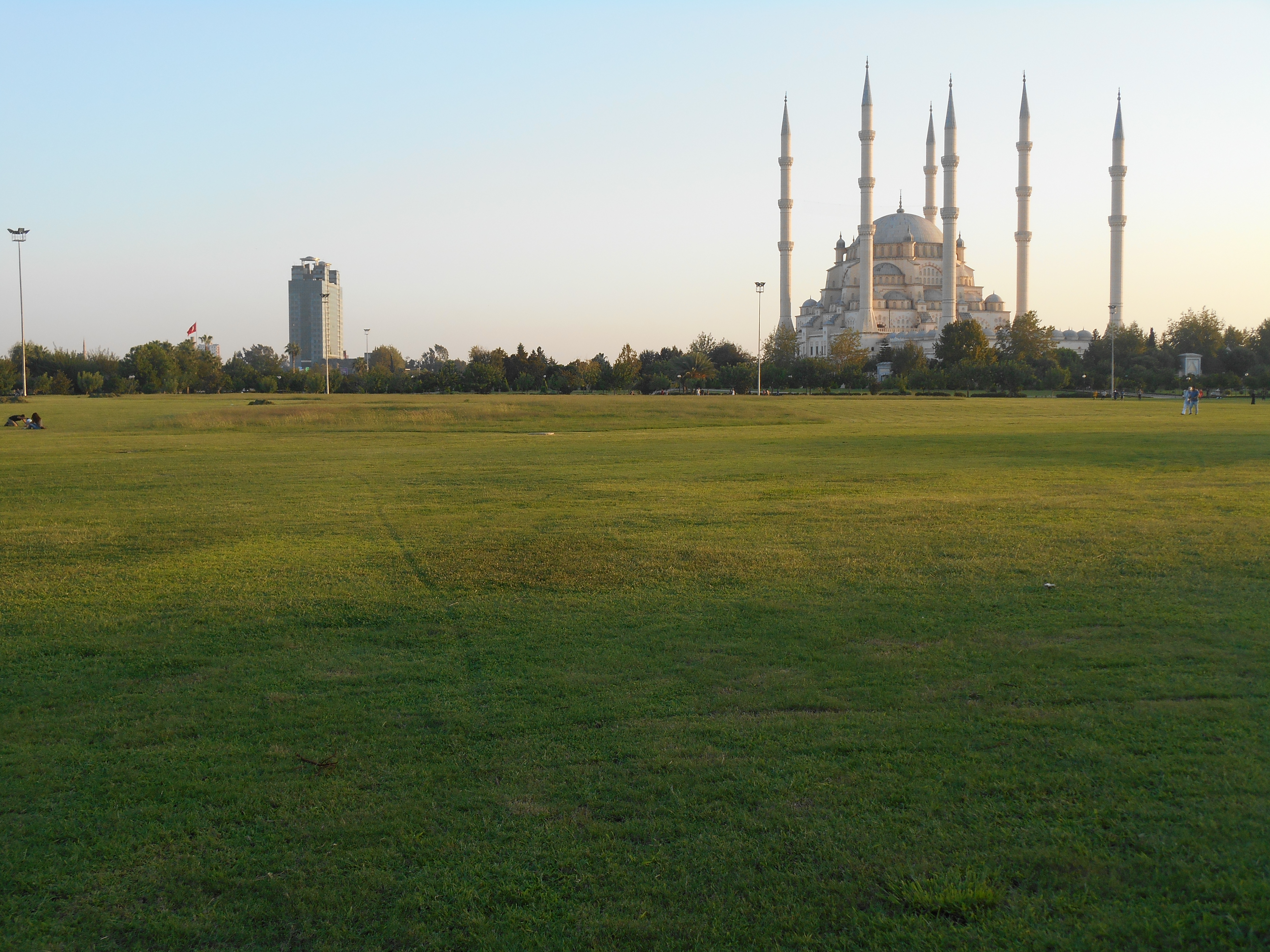
Activity ground

Merkez Park is well landscaped and carries a wide variety of trees and plants in an open concept. There are 67 species of trees and bushes, 40 species of cactuses, aromatic and ground covering plants. The number of total plants exceed 400 thousand. Some of the plants that were brought from Italy are shaped as animal figures. Within the park there are 12 ponds and a 2.2-hectare (5.4-acre) playground for children including the disabled. At the section for the youth there is a skating court, ground chess and mini amphitheater. Viewing terraces are built on a higher level and there are also circular shaped resting terraces. There are also 3 km (1.9 mi) running and cycling paths between the park and Fuzuli Street.

A 2100-seat amphitheater at the north of the park hosts concerts and movie theatres. Next to the amphitheater, there is a quay for river boats. A rowing club located inside Merkez Park provides rowing at the river.
