= Adana Atatürk Sports Hall =

Arena in Adana, Turkey

Adana ASKİ Atatürk Sports Hall
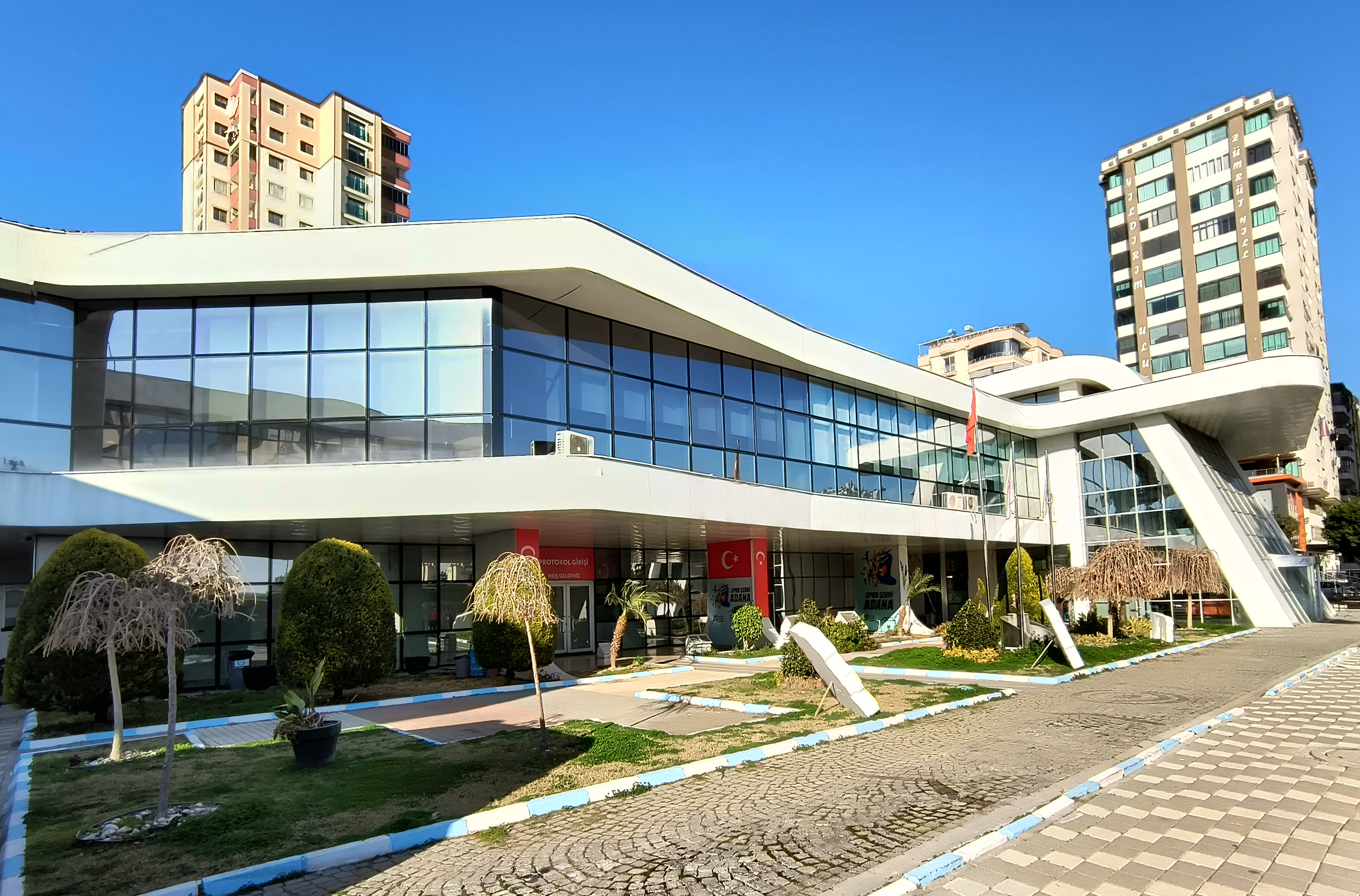
- Interactive map of Adana ASKİ Atatürk Sports Hall
- Location: Şair hasibehatun Cd No:45, Yurt mh., Çukurova, Adana
- Coordinates: 37°02′35″N 35°17′25″E
- Owner: Adana Metropolitan Municipality
- Operator: Adana Metropolitan Municipality
- Capacity: Basketball: 2500; Volleyball: 2500

Construction
- Opened: 19 September 2017

Tenants
- Adana Demirspor A.Ş.

Atatürk ASKİ Sports Hall is a multi-purpose indoor arena located in the Çukurova district of Adana, situated just north of the Hayal Park. The arena is built by the Greater Adana Municipality and opened on 19 September 2017.

Adana Demirspor A.Ş. volleyball team play their Turkish Women's Volleyball League home matches in the Atatürk Sports Hall.

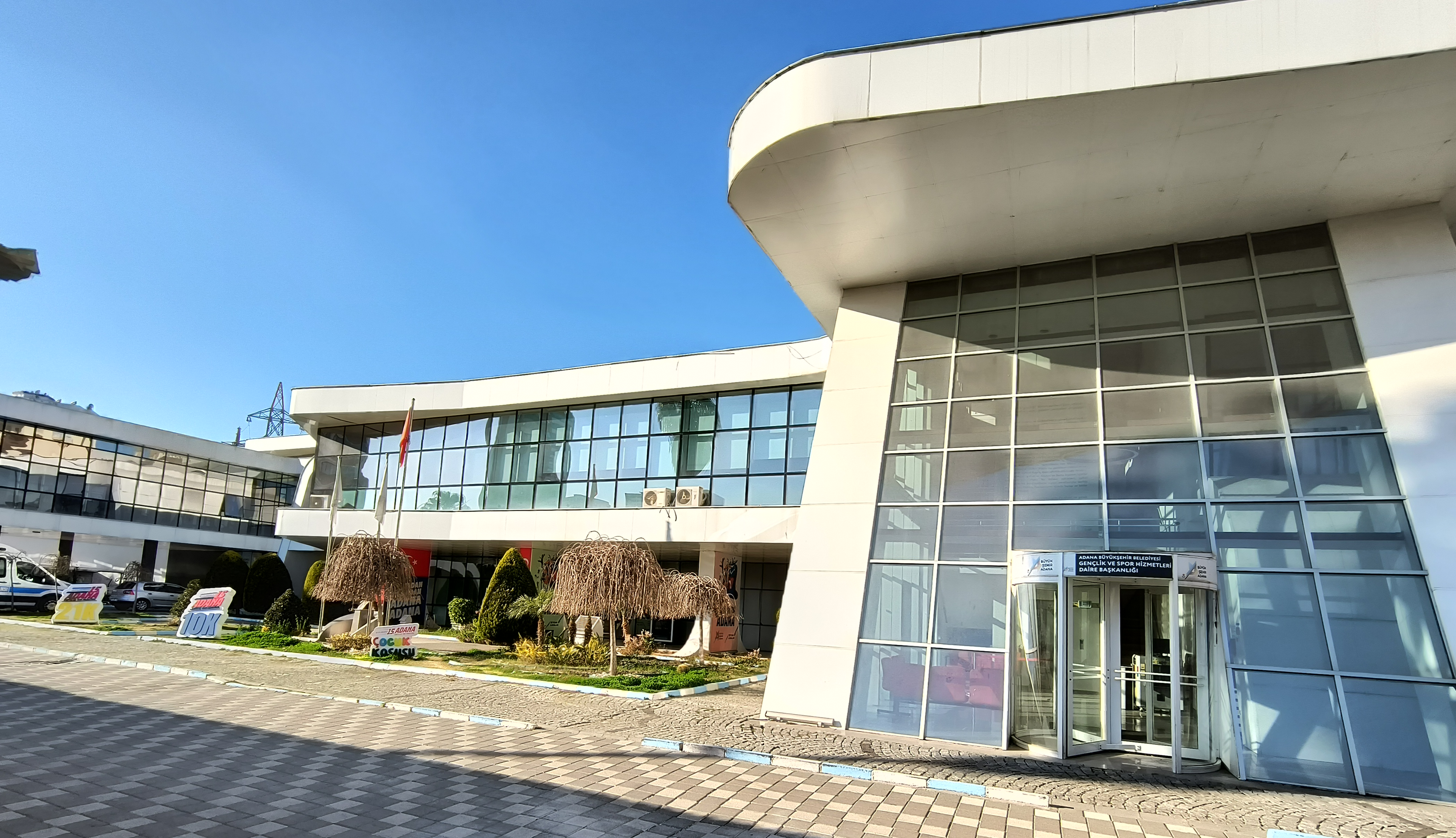
East view
