= Şambayadı, Çukurova =

Coordinates: 37°03′N 35°12′E

Şambayadı
- Neighbourhood
- Location in Turkey
- Coordinates
- Country: Turkey
- Province: Adana
- District: Çukurova
- Population (2022): 5,251
- Time zone: UTC+3 (TRT)

Şambayadı is a neighbourhood in the municipality and district of Çukurova, Adana Province, Turkey. Its population is 5,251 (2022). Before 2008, it was part of the district of Seyhan.
