= Kuyucu, Karaisalı =

Kuyucu
- Neighbourhood
- Location in Turkey
- Coordinates: 37°12′N 35°06′E
- Country: Turkey
- Province: Adana
- District: Karaisalı
- Population (2022): 109
- Time zone: UTC+3 (TRT)

Kuyucu is a neighbourhood in the municipality and district of Karaisalı, Adana Province, Turkey. Its population is 109 (2022).
