= Murtçukuru, Karaisalı =

Murtçukuru
- Neighbourhood
- Location in Turkey
- Coordinates: 37°11′N 34°58′E
- Country: Turkey
- Province: Adana
- District: Karaisalı
- Population (2022): 137
- Time zone: UTC+3 (TRT)

Murtçukuru is a neighbourhood in the municipality and district of Karaisalı, Adana Province, Turkey. Its population is 137 (2022).
