= Tatık, Karaisalı =

Tatık
- Neighbourhood
- Location in Turkey
- Coordinates: 37°15′34″N 35°24′03″E
- Country: Turkey
- Province: Adana
- District: Karaisalı
- Population (2022): 66
- Time zone: UTC+3 (TRT)

Tatık is a neighbourhood in the municipality and district of Karaisalı, Adana Province, Turkey. Its population is 66 (2022).
