= Kaledağı, Karaisalı =

Kaledağı
- Neighbourhood
- Location in Turkey
- Coordinates: 37°25′N 35°17′E
- Country: Turkey
- Province: Adana
- District: Karaisalı
- Population (2022): 414
- Time zone: UTC+3 (TRT)

Kaledağı is a neighbourhood in the municipality and district of Karaisalı, Adana Province, Turkey. Its population is 414 (2022).
