= Karahasanlı, Karaisalı =

Karahasanlı
- Neighbourhood
- Location in Turkey
- Coordinates: 37.3167°N 35.1333°E
- Country: Turkey
- Province: Adana
- District: Karaisalı
- Population (2022): 33
- Time zone: UTC+3 (TRT)

Karahasanlı is a neighbourhood in the municipality and district of Karaisalı, Adana Province, Turkey. Its population is 33 (2022).
