= Karakılıç, Karaisalı =

Karakılıç
- Neighbourhood
- Location in Turkey
- Coordinates: 37.3094°N 34.9883°E
- Country: Turkey
- Province: Adana
- District: Karaisalı
- Population (2022): 194
- Time zone: UTC+3 (TRT)

Karakılıç is a neighbourhood in the municipality and district of Karaisalı, Adana Province, Turkey. Its population is 194 (2022).
