= Demirçit, Karaisalı =

Demirçit
- Neighbourhood
- Location in Turkey
- Coordinates: 37°12′N 34°58′E
- Country: Turkey
- Province: Adana
- District: Karaisalı
- Population (2022): 70
- Time zone: UTC+3 (TRT)

Demirçit is a neighbourhood in the municipality and district of Karaisalı, Adana Province, Turkey. Its population is 70 (2022).
