= Çorlu, Karaisalı =

Çorlu
- Neighbourhood
- Location in Turkey
- Coordinates: 37.3262°N 35.1452°E
- Country: Turkey
- Province: Adana
- District: Karaisalı
- Population (2022): 509
- Time zone: UTC+3 (TRT)

Çorlu is a neighbourhood in the municipality and district of Karaisalı, Adana Province, Turkey. Its population is 509 (2022).
