= Çukur, Karaisalı =

Çukur
- Neighbourhood
- Location in Turkey
- Coordinates: 37.3592°N 35.0971°E
- Country: Turkey
- Province: Adana
- District: Karaisalı
- Population (2022): 821
- Time zone: UTC+3 (TRT)

Çukur is a neighbourhood in the municipality and district of Karaisalı, Adana Province, Turkey. Its population is 821 (2022).
