= Kapıkaya Canyon =

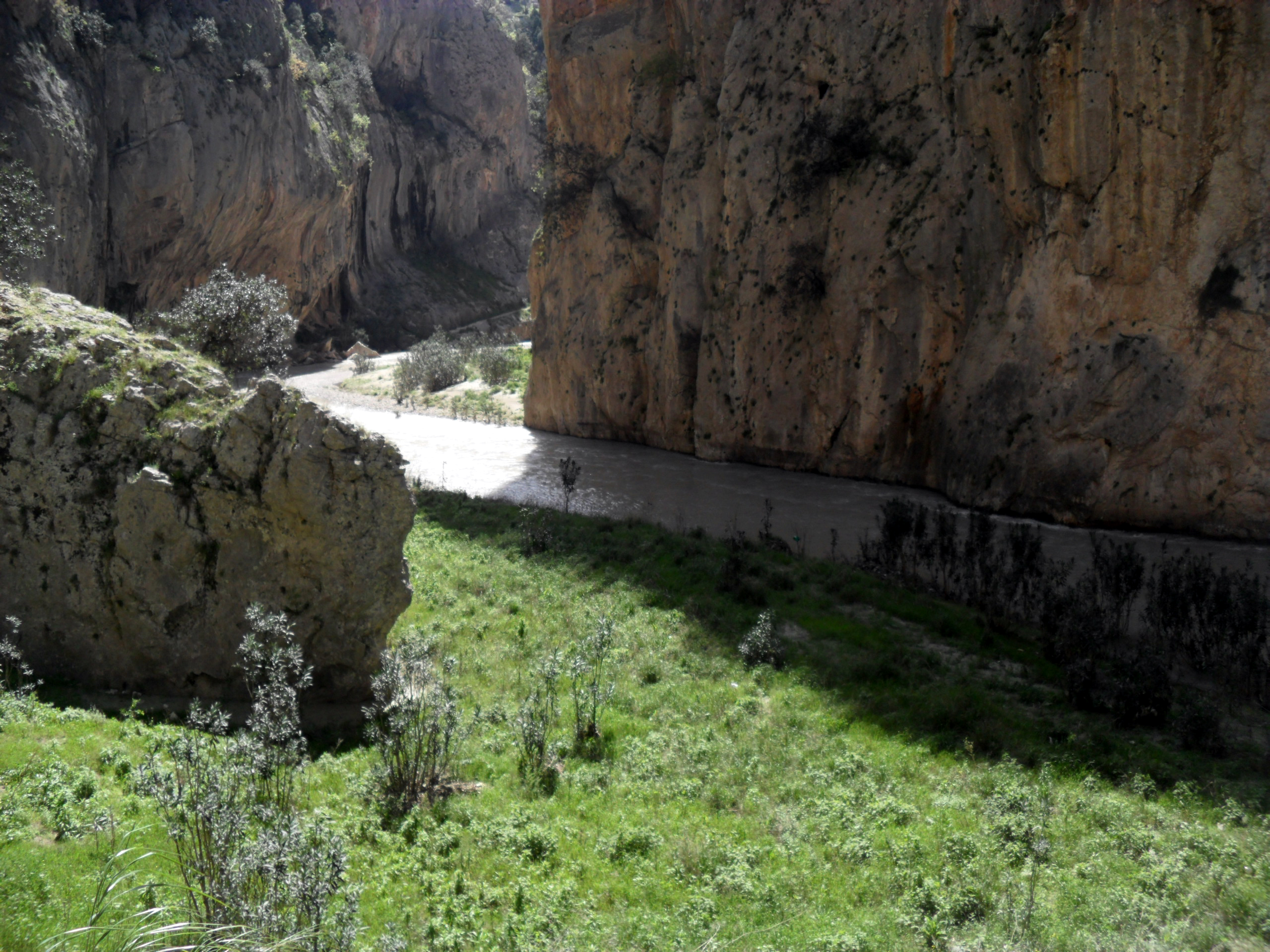
- Kapıkaya Canyon

- Location within Turkey
- Length: 5.5 km (3.4 mi)

Geography
- Population centers: Kapıkaya
- Coordinates: 37°14′40″N 34°58′36″E
- Rivers: Çakıt Creek
- Interactive map of Kapıkaya Canyon

Kapıkaya Canyon is a canyon located in Adana Province, southern Turkey.

== Geography ==
The canyon is the valley of the Çakıt Creek one of the main tributaries of Seyhan River. Its course is from north to south and the birds flight distance between its two ends is about 5.5 kilometres (3.4 mi). The northern end is the Çakıt dam reservoir. The southern end at 37°14′40″N 34°58′36″E is marked by a bridge near Kapıkaya village. The distance to Adana is 72 kilometres (45 mi). The famous Varda Bridge is situated about 2 kilometres (1.2 mi) west of the canyon.

== Touristic attraction ==
In the northern end the municipality of Karaisalı has established a picnic area known as Yerköprü .In the southern end, a 2000-meter walking track has been constructed at the east bank of the creek using the funds of the Çukurova Development Agency.
