= Maraşlı, Karaisalı =

Maraşlı
- Neighbourhood
- Location in Turkey
- Coordinates: 37°18′09″N 35°05′13″E
- Country: Turkey
- Province: Adana
- District: Karaisalı
- Population (2022): 245
- Time zone: UTC+3 (TRT)

Maraşlı is a neighbourhood in the municipality and district of Karaisalı, Adana Province, Turkey. Its population is 245 (2022).
