= Körüklü, Karaisalı =

Körüklü
- Neighbourhood
- Location in Turkey
- Coordinates: 37.2467°N 35.2272°E
- Country: Turkey
- Province: Adana
- District: Karaisalı
- Population (2022): 166
- Time zone: UTC+3 (TRT)

Körüklü is a village in the municipality and district of Karaisalı, Adana Province, Turkey. Its population is 166 (2022).
