= Ege Bagatur =

Turkish politician

Mayor of Adana
- In office 9 December 1973 – 11 December 1977
- Preceded by: Erdoğan Özlüşen
- Succeeded by: Selahattin Çolak

Personal details
- Born: 22 February 1937 Adana
- Died: 16 November 1990 (aged 53) Adana
- Party: Republican People's Party (CHP)
- Occupation: Lawyer

Ege Bagatur (22 February 1937 – 16 November 1990) was a Turkish politician who served as the mayor of Adana from 1973 to 1977.

== Biography ==
Ege Bagatur was born in Adana in 1937. He completed his primary and secondary education in Adana. In 1961, he graduated from Ankara University's school of law. After completing his law trainee and compulsory military service, he started to work as a lawyer in Adana in 1965. He then joined politics under Republican People's Party (CHP) and became the mayor of Adana in 1973 at the age of 36. He served as mayor until 1977. From 1977 to his death in 1990, he continued to work as a lawyer.
