= Kapıkaya, Karaisalı =

Kapıkaya
- Neighbourhood
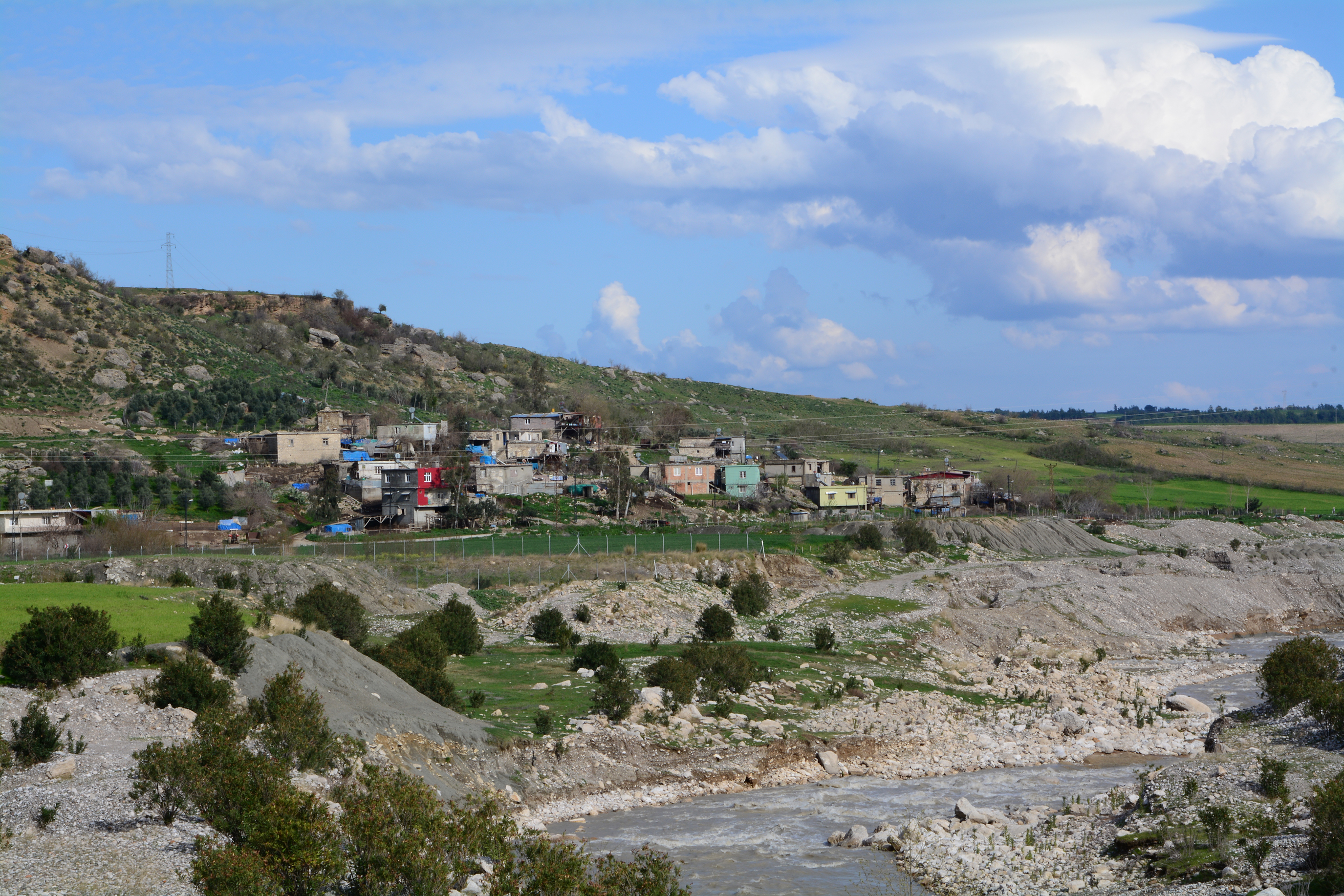

- Location within Turkey
- Coordinates: 37.2333°N 35.0167°E
- Country: Turkey
- Province: Adana
- District: Karaisalı
- Population (2022): 135
- Time zone: UTC+3 (TRT)

Kapıkaya is a neighbourhood in the municipality and district of Karaisalı, Adana Province, Turkey. Its population is 135 (2022). Kapıkaya Canyon is to the north of the village.
