= Topkaralı, Karaisalı =

Topkaralı
- Neighbourhood
- Location in Turkey
- Coordinates: 37.2071°N 35.2243°E
- Country: Turkey
- Province: Adana
- District: Karaisalı
- Population (2022): 79
- Time zone: UTC+3 (TRT)

Topkaralı is a neighbourhood in the municipality and district of Karaisalı, Adana Province, Turkey. Its population is 79 (2022).
