= Fettahlı, Karaisalı =

Fettahlı
- Neighbourhood
- Location in Turkey
- Coordinates: 37°15′49″N 35°19′34″E
- Country: Turkey
- Province: Adana
- District: Karaisalı
- Population (2022): 64
- Time zone: UTC+3 (TRT)

Fettahlı (formerly: Sarıkonak) is a neighbourhood in the municipality and district of Karaisalı, Adana Province, Turkey. Its population is 64 (2022).
