= Çevlik, Karaisalı =

Çevlik
- Neighbourhood
- Location in Turkey
- Coordinates: 37.3674°N 35.0677°E
- Country: Turkey
- Province: Adana
- District: Karaisalı
- Population (2022): 324
- Time zone: UTC+3 (TRT)

Çevlik is a neighbourhood in the municipality and district of Karaisalı, Adana Province, Turkey. Its population is 324 (2022).
