= Aytaç Durak =

Turkish mayor

Mayor of Adana
- In office 27 March 1994 – 30 March 2014
- Preceded by: Selahattin Çolak
- Succeeded by: Hüseyin Sözlü

Mayor of Adana
- In office 25 March 1984 – 26 March 1989
- Preceded by: Ali Ahmet Kelecek
- Succeeded by: Selahattin Çolak

Adana Municipal Councillor
- In office 1963 – 12 September 1980

Personal details
- Born: 1938 (age 87–88) Karaisalı, Adana, Turkey
- Party: AP, ANAP, AK Party, MHP
- Occupation: Civil Engineer

Aytaç Durak (born 1938) is a Turkish politician, and was the mayor of Adana between 1984 and 2014, excluding one term (1989–1994). He is the longest serving locally elected city mayor in Turkey. Adding his 17 years as a municipal councillor, he served the municipality of Adana for 42 years by the end of this term in 2014. He was the president of the Municipalities Union of Turkey for 17 years and the Çukurova Municipalities Union for 12 years.

Aytaç Durak is the only politician to have run in all the municipal elections since 1973; twice as councillor, six times as mayoral candidate, losing only once in the 1989 mayoral race. He is regarded as the doyen of Turkey's local politics.

== Early life ==
Aytaç Durak was born in Karaisalı district of Adana Province in 1938 to a middle-class merchant family. He was the second eldest of the six siblings. He completed his primary education (Grade 1-5) at Gazipaşa Public School, secondary education at Tepebağ Middle School (Grade 6-8) and at Adana Lycee for Boys (Grade 9-11). He studied civil engineering at Istanbul Technical University from 1957 to 1963.

== Career ==
He started his career in 1963 at State Hydraulic Works (DSİ) as Drinking Water Chief of Adana. In 1965, he was appointed as YSE (Road-Water-Electric Agency now called Rural Services) Director for Adana Province.

At the mean time, he became the member of Adana Chamber of Commerce. He completed compulsory military service at Ankara-Mamak War Institute and Military Research and Development Agency. Later in his life, he founded a construction company (Durak İnşaat) with his 2 civil engineer brothers and, during the 1970s and early 1980s, he built over 2000 homes.

=== Adana Municipal Councillor ===
In the local elections in 1963, after starting his career at DSİ, he was appointed as Adana municipal councillor representing DSİ. After two terms as appointed Municipal Councillor, in the 1973 municipal elections, he ran from Justice Party and elected as municipal councillor. In the next election in 1977 he was re-elected and also acted as the speaker of the Justice Party at the council. He served two terms as elected councillor and removed from the council by coup d'état on 12 September 1980, with all the other politicians in Turkey. Municipal democracy was suspended until 1984.

During the years that he was at the council, he formed the ideas that will later revolutionize the cityscape; expanding city to north and revitalizing Seyhan River and building large recreational areas around it.

=== Mayor of Adana ===
In the municipal elections on 25 March 1984, Durak was elected mayor of Adana representing Motherland Party (ANAP). During his first term as mayor, he expanded city to north by planning a modern residential district to house 200 thousand residents. He named this district as Yeni Adana (New Adana). He constructed Adnan Menderes Boulevard along the south shores of Seyhan Reservoir and built parks, picnic areas around it. Adnan Menderes Boulevard then became the main recreational area for the city. He built Regülatör Köprü on Seyhan river south of the old town, a bridge which also acts as a regulator of river water. This caused the part of the river, that is within the city limits, to be full all year around. The river which used to partially dry and have odour in summer times, revitalized and became the core recreational area of the city. During this term, he also founded municipal-owned not-for-profit construction company which built thousands of homes for low-income residents.

Although having a successful term, in the municipal election of 1989, Durak lost his post to Selahattin Çolak. This was due to the partisan municipal election system in Turkey. His party ANAP was the governing party, but became very unpopular during this time. To protest the governing party, voters chose opposition parties' candidates during the municipal elections without considering candidates' individual skills.

In the municipal elections of 27 March 1994 Durak was re-elected as mayor of Adana again representing ANAP, this time voters focusing on candidates' skills by comparing his term to Selahattin Çolak's term. At this term, he started building recreational pathways on both banks of Seyhan river from south end to Seyhan Reservoir. He gave special attention to Dilberler Sekisi, most scenic part of the recreational pathway between the old and the new dam. He renovated Atatürk Park and many other parks, built new recreational areas on the northern section of the city. He continued building infrastructure to expand city to north. The construction of Adana Metro, 13.5 km long rapid transit system, started in 1997.

Durak was re-elected to the office in the local election in 1999 representing ANAP for the third term. At this term he started the construction of Merkez Park, a 33-hectare urban park along Seyhan river, which is now one of the largest urban parks in Turkey. At this period, he also started building public pools for safe swimming mostly at low-income neighborhoods due the fact that nearly 100 children suffocate every year when chilling out at Seyhan river and irrigation canals during the hot and humid summers. Currently city boasts 35 municipal swimming pools built only within the last 10 years.

Before the municipal election of 2004, Durak resigned from ANAP and joined Justice and Development Party (AK Party). ANAP had only 5.1% of the popular votes in the 2002 general elections and became a minor party after. On 28 March 2004, he was re-elected as mayor of Adana for the fourth term receiving 39% of popular votes. During this period, he completed the construction of the Merkez Park and many other parks, thus, city became much greener. The construction of Adana Metro was suspended during this period due to financial reasons. Construction resumed in 2008 and expected to be completed by the end of 2009. Metro that is under construction for 12 years is the major headache for Aytaç Durak.

In late 2008, AK Party decided not to make Aytaç Durak their candidate for the 2009 municipal elections. Following immediately, Durak resigned from AK Party and joined Nationalist Movement Party (MHP). This election was one of his most difficult elections and although being a candidate of the third popular party, his high profile helped him win the elections with only 1,500 vote margin against governing AK Party candidate. For his 5th term, Durak promised to complete urban redevelopment projects for Sinanpaşa, Göl and Fatih neighborhoods, and building the second line for Metro which would extend from Sinanpaşa to Çukurova University.

On 17 March 2010, Aytaç Durak resigned from MHP until being cleared from allegations for fortune building by raising the land value of his family property. On 28 March Aytaç Durak is suspended from mayoral duties by Ministry of Internal Affairs for two months.

=== President of Municipalities Union of Turkey (TBB) ===
In 1987, Durak was elected the president of TBB, an agency to build co-operation among municipalities. He left this position in 1989, due to not being re-elected as mayor of Adana. After his election as Adana mayor in 1994, he was elected again as the president of the Union of Municipalities of Turkey. He held the title until April'09, when he was removed from the post by Ministry of Internal Affairs. Durak and his party MHP protested removal, stating that presidency ends naturally at Union's Directors' Elections by not being re-elected.

During his presidency of TBB, he went to court for the unequal municipal taxation law. With the old municipal tax law, the corporates used to pay municipal taxes at the location of their headquarters which are mainly in Istanbul and Ankara. This caused lack of revenue for other cities. The court found municipal taxation system was not fair and the parliament changed the law, which made a better distribution of municipal revenue among cities.

One of his major concerns as TBB president was the partisan municipal election system. He criticized the current system for creating dependency to national politics. Almost all the time, mayor of a municipality is chosen among the candidates of the national parties. Independent candidacy is possible, but very difficult to succeed; the only independent winner of a city in 2009 was Eşref Fakıbaba of Şanlıurfa. Before 2009 elections, Durak lobbied at the national level for change in the municipal election system. He proposed an election system where all the candidates have to run independently without representing any political party; a system that is used in many western countries.

=== President of Çukurova Municipalities Union (ÇBB) ===
Çukurova, a geographical, economical and cultural region, is separated with high mountains from other regions and resembles more like a state of its own. Although, the economical and cultural issues that communities in Çukurova face are similar, interrelations among the communities were poor. Durak with other mayors of the region wanted to improve co-operation among the communities of Çukurova. Çukurova Municipalities Union was incorporated in 1997 to be a voice of the local governments in the region. Durak was elected the first president of ÇBB.

Aytaç Durak focused on improving the municipal governing skills of all the municipal staff in Çukurova. Regular internal education seminars are held throughout the region. Organized with the support of the municipalities, region-wide cultural events became common. Çukurova Art Days is a four-day festival that takes place throughout Çukurova since 2007.

After 12 years as the president of ÇBB, Durak did not run again in the 2009 General Assembly. Mayor of Mersin, Macit Özcan, is elected the second president of ÇBB.

== Personal life ==
Durak is married to Türkan Durak and has two children. His son, Gökhan Durak, who is also a civil engineer, runs a local television (Çukurova TV) in Adana. His daughter has a degree in landscape architecture.

Durak likes spending his summer leisure times with his grand children at his cottage in Kızıldağ plateau of Karaisalı. He regularly goes to 5 Ocak Stadium to watch the football games of Adanaspor and Adana Demirspor. He frequently attends theaters and music concerts.

Aytaç Durak is famed in Turkey, for avoiding kissing men when greeting. In greeting traditions of Turkey, men shake hands and kiss each other on both cheeks. During the long greeting ceremonies of political parties, Durak considers kissing each member unhealthy and time consuming. He prefers to just shake hands.

Political offices
Preceded by Selahattin Çolak	Mayor of Adana; 1994–2014	Succeeded by Hüseyin Sözlü
