= Selahattin Çolak =

Turkish politician

Mayor of Adana
- In office 26 March 1989 – 27 March 1994
- Preceded by: Aytaç Durak
- Succeeded by: Aytaç Durak

Mayor of Adana
- In office 11 December 1977 – 12 September 1980
- Preceded by: Ege Bagatur
- Succeeded by: Nuri Korkmaz

Personal details
- Party: Republican People's Party (CHP), Social Democratic People's Party (SHP)
- Occupation: Police chief, business owner

Selahattin Çolak is a politician from Turkey, and served as the mayor of Adana for two terms (1977–1980 and 1989–1994).

== Career ==
He served in police services before entering politics. He was the security chief for Süleyman Demirel during the 1970s when Demirel was prime minister of Turkey.

=== Mayor of Adana ===
At the municipal elections on 11 December 1977, he was elected Mayor of Adana from Republican People's Party (CHP). On 12 September 1980, he was removed from office by coup d'état with all the other politicians in Turkey. On 26 March 1989 he was elected again as Mayor of Adana. He served in the post until 1994, and did not run again, when his party, CHP, did not choose him as their candidate.
