= Karaisalı =

- District and municipality
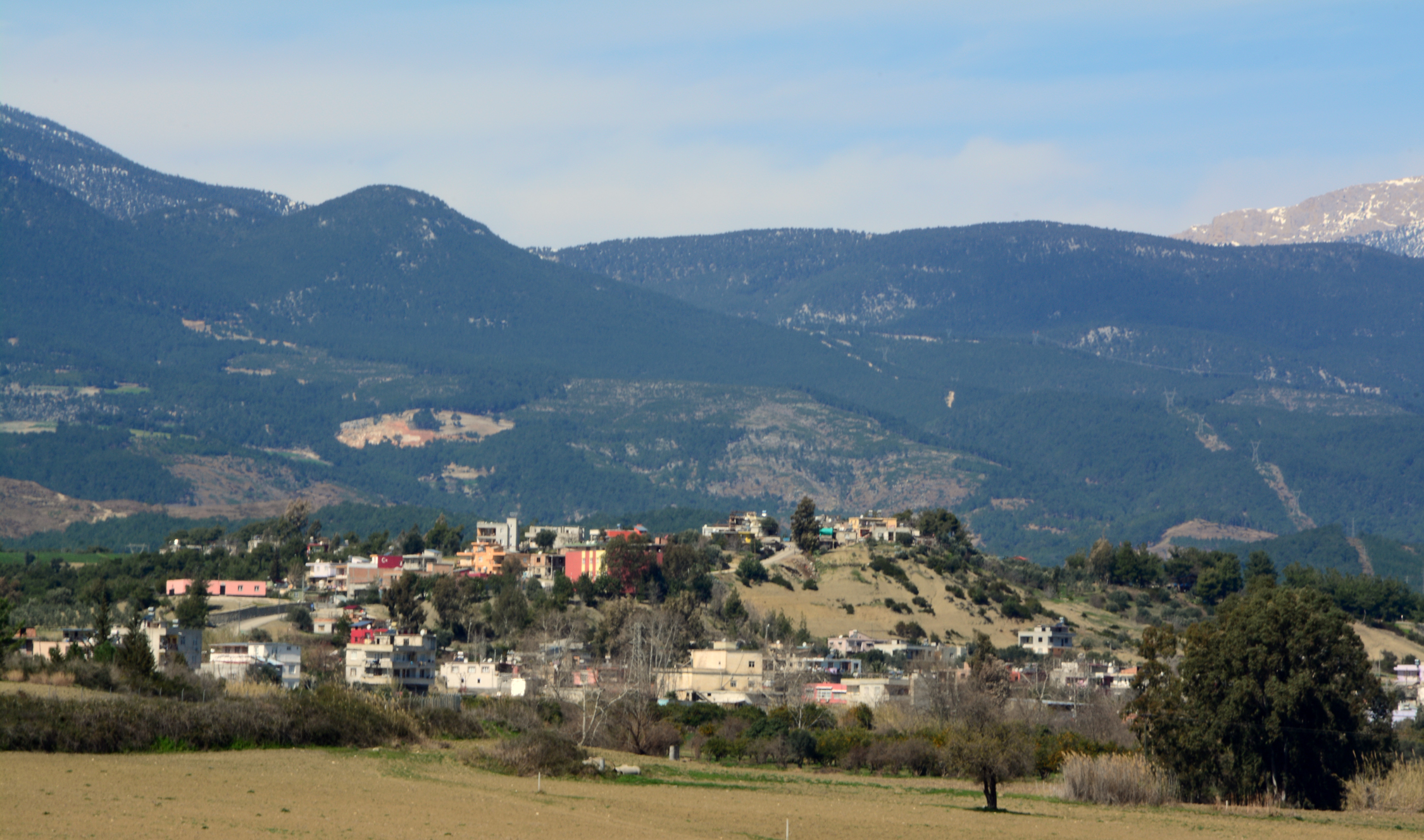

- Map showing Karaisalı District in Adana Province

- Location within Turkey
- Coordinates: 37°15′40″N 35°03′36″E
- Country: Turkey
- Province: Adana

Government
  - Mayor: Bekir Şimşek (MHP)
- Area: 1,165 km^{2} (450 sq mi)
- Elevation: 230 m (750 ft)
- Population (2022): 22,042
  - Density: 18.92/km^{2} (49.00/sq mi)
- Time zone: UTC+3 (TRT)
- Postal code: 01770
- Area code: 0322
- Website: www.karaisali.bel.tr

Karaisalı is a municipality and district of Adana Province, Turkey. Its area is 1,165 km^{2}, and its population is 22,042 (2022).

The area contains the reservoirs of Çatalan and Nergizlik. There is a wrestling tournament in late-April to early-May at Salbaş and a countryside festival in the last week of August at Kızıldağ.

== History ==
In Greek and Roman times there was a town here named Midelle. Throughout history, the town was controlled by several kingdoms, such as the Seljuk Turks and Armenian Kingdom of Cilicia. Following the arrival of the Turks in the area the name was changed to Çeceli and inhabited by the Yüreğir and Menemencioğulları and Ramazanoğulları tribes.

Between 1481 and 1496 the town was controlled by the Mamluk Sultanate and once it was defeated by the Ottoman sultan Selim I, he left the control of the town to the Ramazanoğulları dynasty as a vassal state. The current name Karaisalı was later given in memory of a Ramazanoğulları lord. Right before his death in 1520 however, Selim I decided to formally annex the town and the surrounding region into the Ottoman Empire.

The town was not occupied by the Allies during the Turkish War of Independence in the early 1920s and became a centre of Turkish resistance against the Allies for the Çukurova area.

== Composition ==
There are 62 neighbourhoods in Karaisalı District:

- Akçalı
- Aktaş
- Altınova
- Aşağıbelemedik
- Aşağıyörükler
- Ayakkıf
- Barakdağı
- Başkıf
- Bekirli
- Beydemir
- Bolacalı
- Boztahta
- Bucak
- Çakallı
- Çatalan
- Çeceli
- Çevlik
- Çocuklar
- Çorlu
- Çukur
- Demirçit
- Döşekevi
- Durak
- Eğlence
- Emelcik
- Etekli
- Fettahlı
- Filikli
- Gildirli
- Gökhasanlı
- Gülüşlü
- Güvenç
- Hacılı
- Hacımusalı
- Kaledağı
- Kapıkaya
- Karahasanlı
- Karakılıç
- Karakuyu
- Karapınar
- Kıralan
- Kırıklı
- Kocaveliler
- Körüklü
- Kuşcusofulu
- Kuyucu
- Kuzgun
- Maraşlı
- Murtçukuru
- Nergizlik
- Nuhlu
- Ömerli
- Sadıkali
- Sarımehmetli
- Saypınar
- Selampınar
- Tatık
- Topaktaş
- Topkaralı
- Torunsolaklı
- Tümenli
- Yazıbaşı

== Climate ==
Karaisalı has a hot-summer Mediterranean climate (Köppen: Csa) with mild, rainy winters and very hot, dry, yet muggy summers.

Climate data for Karaisalı (1991–2020)
Month	Jan	Feb	Mar	Apr	May	Jun	Jul	Aug	Sep	Oct	Nov	Dec	Year
Mean daily maximum °C (°F)	13.5 (56.3)	14.8 (58.6)	18.1 (64.6)	22.3 (72.1)	26.9 (80.4)	31.2 (88.2)	34.0 (93.2)	34.9 (94.8)	32.3 (90.1)	28.1 (82.6)	21.2 (70.2)	15.3 (59.5)	24.4 (75.9)
Daily mean °C (°F)	9.2 (48.6)	10.2 (50.4)	13.2 (55.8)	16.8 (62.2)	21.0 (69.8)	25.0 (77.0)	28.0 (82.4)	28.5 (83.3)	25.8 (78.4)	22.0 (71.6)	15.9 (60.6)	10.9 (51.6)	18.9 (66.0)
Mean daily minimum °C (°F)	5.7 (42.3)	6.2 (43.2)	8.7 (47.7)	11.9 (53.4)	15.7 (60.3)	19.4 (66.9)	22.7 (72.9)	23.1 (73.6)	20.1 (68.2)	16.8 (62.2)	11.5 (52.7)	7.4 (45.3)	14.1 (57.4)
Average precipitation mm (inches)	132.82 (5.23)	97.17 (3.83)	76.85 (3.03)	81.37 (3.20)	72.72 (2.86)	47.88 (1.89)	16.89 (0.66)	15.43 (0.61)	36.0 (1.42)	43.28 (1.70)	80.79 (3.18)	169.13 (6.66)	870.33 (34.26)
Average precipitation days (≥ 1.0 mm)	7.5	7.8	7.5	7.3	6.7	4.2	2.2	2.2	3.3	3.8	5.0	8.7	66.2
Average relative humidity (%)	59.2	59.3	60.8	64.3	65.7	65.9	67.6	66.5	60.0	53.4	51.8	59.6	61.2
Source: NOAA

== Places of interest ==
- The Roman built Milvan Castle in the village of Karakılıç.
- The silk road caravanserai Kesiri Han in the village of Altınova.
- Another Roman castle Keçi Kalesi 40 km north-east of Karaisalı in the village of Etekli. has commanding views from its hill-top position.
- The wooded hillside picnic areas of Yerköprü and Kızıldağ in particular Kapıkaya Canyon.
- The attractive remote village of Kalayçılar. 7 km from the village of Hacılı on a dirt road.
- Turkey's highest bridge, the 172 m (564 ft) long and 93 m (305 ft) high German built railway viaduct Varda Bridge in the village of Hacıkırı (Kıralan).
- The Fish restaurant in Demirçit or otherwise known as Bolagat.

== Notable people ==
Long-term mayor of Adana, Aytaç Durak is from Karaisalı and during his term the district was included in the Metropolitan Municipality of Adana.
