= Kökez =

Kökez can refer to:

- Kökez, Aladağ
- Kökez, Burdur
- Kökez, Eskil
- Kökez, Kıbrıscık
