= Göktaş Dam =

Turkish hydroelectric plant

Göktaş Dam Turkish: Göktaş Barajı) is a hydroelectric plant in Turkey.

The dam is at 37°21′35″N 35°29′02″E between Aladağ and Kozan ilçes (districts) of Adana Province. It is on Zamantı River, a tributary of Seyhan River.

Two units of the hydroelectric plant was opened to service on 2 October 2015. On 29 December 2016 other units were also put into service. Its nominal output power is 275.6 MWe and the annual energy production is 594 GW-hr. Its operator is Bereket Energy.
