= Egener =

Egener is a surname. Notable people with the surname include:

- Mike Egener (born 1984), Canadian ice hockey player
- Minnie Egener (1881–1938), American operatic mezzo-soprano

== See also ==
- Egner
