= Boztahta =

Boztahta (literally "gray wood" or "blemished wood" or "spoilt wood" in Turkish) may refer to the following places in Turkey:

- Boztahta, Aladağ, a village in the district of Aladağ, Adana Province
- Boztahta, Karaisalı, a village in the district of Karaisalı, Adana Province
- Boztahta, Kozan, a village in the district of Kozan, Adana Province
