= Kızıldam =

Kızıldam can refer to:

- Kızıldam, Aladağ
- Kızıldam, Lapseki
- Kızıldam, Yenice
