= Kışlak (disambiguation) =

Kışlak (literally "winter quarters, overwintering, winter pastures" in Turkish) may refer to the following places in Turkey:

- Kışlak, a town in Hatay Province, Turkey
- Kışlak, Aladağ, a village in the District of Aladağ, Adana Province, Turkey
- Kışlak, Gercüş, a village in the District of Gercüş, Batman Province, Turkey
- Kışlak, Kızılcahamam, a village in the District of Kızılcahamam, Ankara Province, Turkey

== See also ==
- Kışla (disambiguation)
