= Çukuryurt =

Çukuryurt may refer to the following places in Turkey:

- Çukuryurt, Eskil
- Çukuryurt, Gercüş
- Çukuryurt, Tercan
