= Uzunkuyu =

Uzunkuyu (literally "long well") is a Turkish place name that may refer to the following places in Turkey:

- Uzunkuyu, Aladağ, a village in the district of Aladağ, Adana Province
- Uzunkuyu, Besni, a village in the district of Besni, Adıyaman Province
