= Madenli =

Madenli can refer to:

- Madenli, Aladağ
- Madenli, Çayeli, a town in Rize Province
- Madenli, Kurşunlu
