= Gökçeköy =

Gökçeköy can refer to:

- Gökçeköy, Aladağ
- Gökçeköy, Sungurlu
