= Yüksekören =

Yüksekören (literally "high ruins" in Turkish) may refer to the following places in Turkey:

- Yüksekören, Aladağ, a village in the district of Aladağ, Adana Province
- Yüksekören, Kozan, a village in the district of Kozan, Adana Province
