= Eskil District =

District of Aksaray Province, Turkey

- District
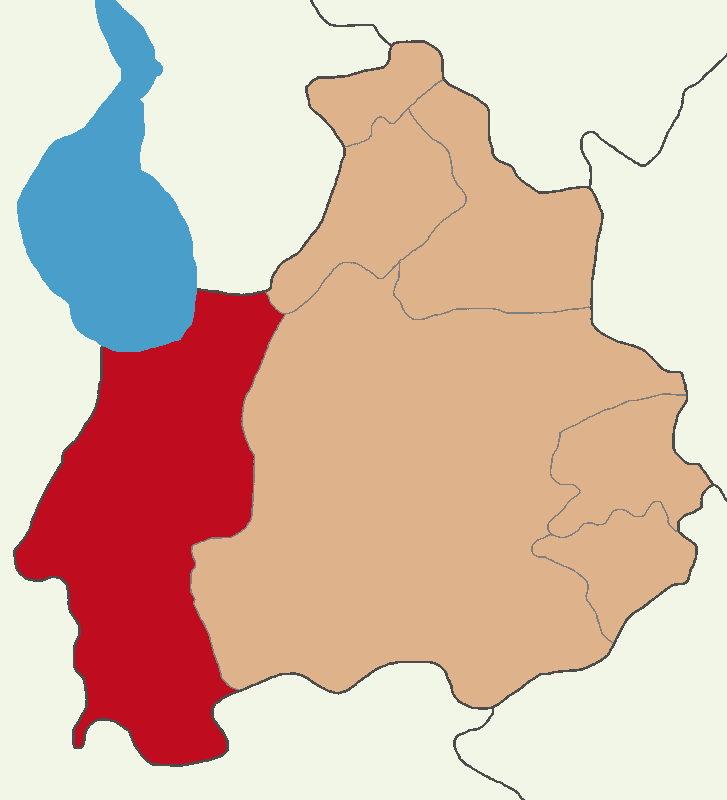
- Map showing Eskil District in Aksaray Province

- Location within Turkey Location within Turkey Central Anatolia
- Coordinates: 38°24′N 33°25′E
- Country: Turkey
- Province: Aksaray
- Seat: Eskil

Government
  - Kaymakam: Yunus Coşkun
- Area: 1,701 km^{2} (657 sq mi)
- Population (2025): 27,946
  - Density: 16.43/km^{2} (42.55/sq mi)
- Time zone: UTC+3 (TRT)
- Website: www.eskil.gov.tr

Eskil District is a district of Aksaray Province of Turkey. Spread over an area of 1,701 km^{2} (657 sq mi), it is the second largest district by area in the province. It had a population of 27,946 in 2025. The district consists of municipalities of Eskil and Eşmekaya, and 11 villages.

== History ==
Eskil was historically known as Eski-İl, and its earliest settlement was near the Gavuröreni area near Lake Tuz. During the rule of the Seljuk Sultanate of Rum, Sultan Kilij Arslan II settled Turkic tribes in the Eskil region. It subsequently served as the administrative centre of the Esb-Keşan in Karaman Province. Eskil District was established on 9 May 1990, under Law No. 3644.

== Geography ==
Eskil is a district of Aksaray Province, Turkey. It is spread over an area of 1,701 km^{2} (657 sq mi), and is the second largest district by area in the province. It is located along the Aksaray–Konya highway approximately 67 km (42 mi) west of Aksaray and 115 km (71 mi) east of Konya. It is located on a flat plain south of Lake Tuz, with an average altitude of 980 m (3,220 ft). It borders Konya Province to the west and south, and other districts of Aksaray Province to the east.

=== Administrative divisions ===
The district consists of municipalities of Eskil and Eşmekaya, and 11 villages.

- Başaran
- Bayramdüğün
- Büğet
- Celil
- Çukuryurt
- Filikçi
- Gümüşdüğün
- Güneşli
- Katrancı
- Kökez
- Sağsak

== Demographics and economy ==
According to 2025 population statistics published by the Turkish Statistical Institute, Eskil District had a population of 27,946 inhabitants, including 14,300 males and 13,646 females. It was the third most populous district in Aksaray Province, accounting for approximately 6.3% of the provincial population. Its population grew by approximately 2.6% between 2020 and 2025.

The district had approximately 80,654.6 hectares (199,302 acres) of agricultural land in 2025. According to a 2025 study, maize was the most cultivated crop, followed by wheat, barley, alfalfa , and sunflower. The study also found that animal husbandry is practised alongside crop cultivation by several agricultural enterprises in the district.
