= Posyağbasan =

- Neighbourhood
- Location in Turkey
- Coordinates: 37°30′N 35°15′E
- Country: Turkey
- Province: Adana
- District: Aladağ
- Population (2022): 404
- Time zone: UTC+3 (TRT)

Posyağbasan is a neighbourhood in the municipality and district of Aladağ, Adana Province, Turkey. Its population is 404 (2022).
