= Topallı =

- Neighbourhood
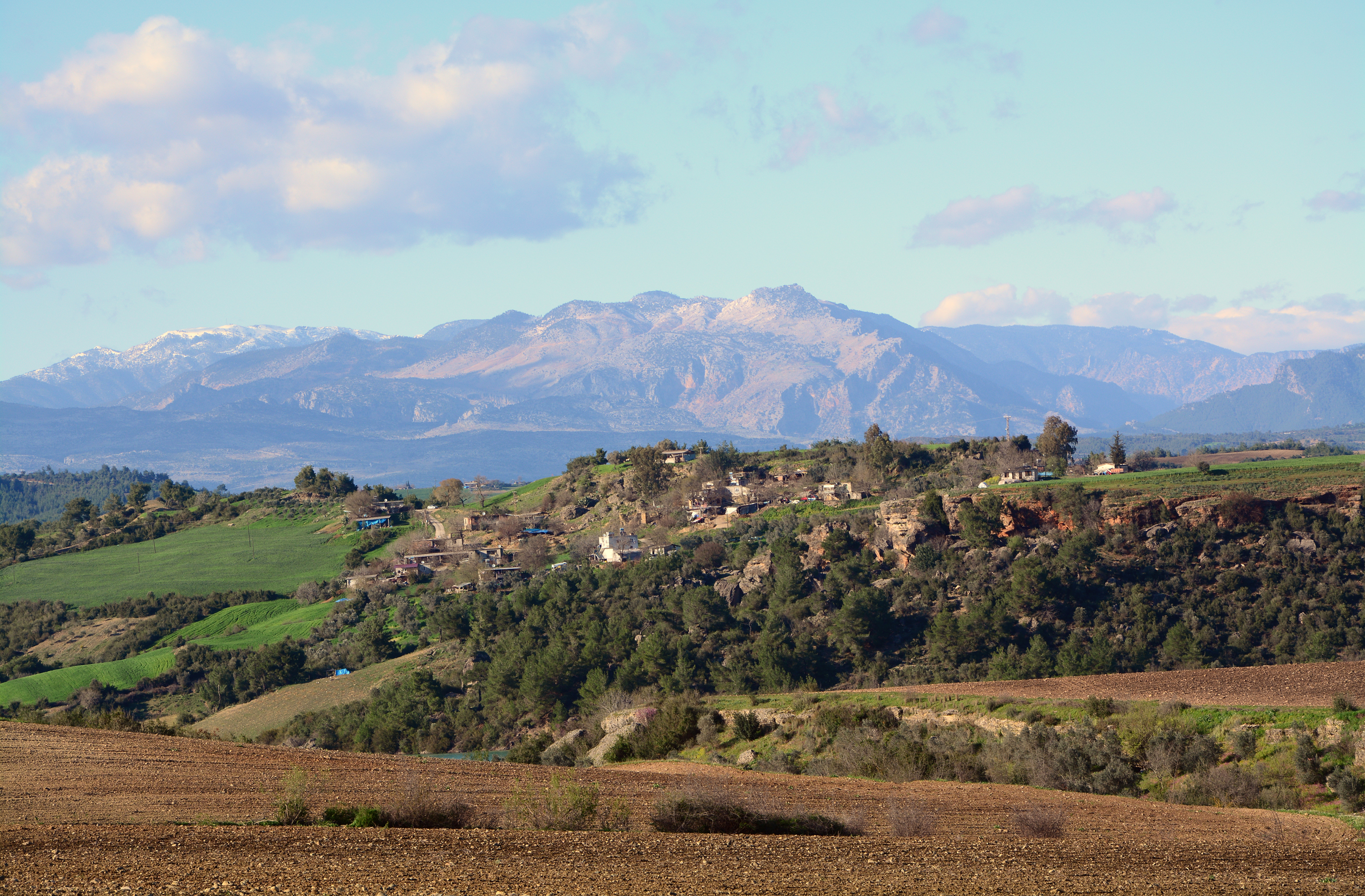
- Topallı (2015)

- Location within Turkey
- Coordinates: 37.3192°N 35.4714°E
- Country: Turkey
- Province: Adana
- District: Aladağ
- Population (2022): 225
- Time zone: UTC+3 (TRT)

Topallı is a neighbourhood in the municipality and district of Aladağ, Adana Province, Turkey. Its population is 225 (2022).
