= Gerdibi =

- Neighbourhood
- Location in Turkey
- Coordinates: 37°31′N 35°09′E
- Country: Turkey
- Province: Adana
- District: Aladağ
- Population (2022): 1,143
- Time zone: UTC+3 (TRT)

Gerdibi is a neighbourhood in the municipality and district of Aladağ, Adana Province, Turkey. Its population is 1,143 (2022).
