= Sağsak, Eskil =

Sağsak
- Village
- Location within Turkey Location within Turkey Central Anatolia
- Coordinates: 38.2929°N 33.3339°E
- Country: Turkey
- Province: Aksaray
- District: Eskil
- Population (2021): 415
- Time zone: UTC+3 (TRT)

Sağsak is a village in the Eskil District, Aksaray Province, Turkey. Its population is 415 (2021).
