= Ebrişim =

Coordinates: 37°31′10″N 35°20′14″E

- Neighbourhood
- Location in Turkey
- Coordinates
- Country: Turkey
- Province: Adana
- District: Aladağ
- Population (2022): 141
- Time zone: UTC+3 (TRT)

Ebrişim is a neighbourhood in the municipality and district of Aladağ, Adana Province, Turkey. Its population is 141 (2022).
