= Egner =

Egner is a German surname. Notable people with the surname include:

- Fritz Egner (born 1949), German broadcaster
- Marie Egner (1850–1940), Austrian painter
- Peter Egner (1922–2011), Holocaust perpetrator
- Philip Egner (1870–1956), United States military bandmaster
- Thorbjørn Egner (1912–1990), Norwegian playwright, songwriter and illustrator

== See also ==
- Eğner, a village in Turkey
- Eggner's Ferry Bridge, a bridge in Kentucky
- Eggner Trio, a piano trio from Vienna, Austria
