= Yetimli =

- Neighbourhood
- Location in Turkey
- Coordinates: 37°36′N 35°20′E
- Country: Turkey
- Province: Adana
- District: Aladağ
- Population (2022): 423
- Time zone: UTC+3 (TRT)

Yetimli is a neighbourhood in the municipality and district of Aladağ, Adana Province, Turkey. Its population is 423 (2022).
