= Küp =

- Neighbourhood
- Location in Turkey
- Coordinates: 37°41′N 35°29′E
- Country: Turkey
- Province: Adana
- District: Aladağ
- Population (2022): 73
- Time zone: UTC+3 (TRT)

Küp is a neighbourhood in the municipality and district of Aladağ, Adana Province, Turkey. Its population is 73 (2022).
