= Başaran, Eskil =

Başaran
- Village
- Location within Turkey Location within Turkey Central Anatolia
- Coordinates: 38.0164°N 33.5419°E
- Country: Turkey
- Province: Aksaray
- District: Eskil
- Population (2021): 715
- Time zone: UTC+3 (TRT)

Başaran is a village in the Eskil District, Aksaray Province, Turkey. Its population was 715 as of 2021.
