= Gireğiyeniköy =

- Neighbourhood
- Country: Turkey
- Province: Adana
- District: Aladağ
- Population (2022): 278
- Time zone: UTC+3 (TRT)

Gireğiyeniköy is a neighbourhood in the municipality and district of Aladağ, Adana Province, Turkey. Its population is 278 (2022).
