= Katrancı, Eskil =

Katrancı
- Village
- Location within Turkey Location within Turkey Central Anatolia
- Country: Turkey
- Province: Aksaray
- District: Eskil
- Population (2021): 457
- Time zone: UTC+3 (TRT)

Katrancı is a village in the Eskil District, Aksaray Province, Turkey. Its population is 457 (2021).
