= Eşmekaya, Eskil =

Eşmekaya
- Municipality
- Location in Turkey Eşmekaya (Turkey Central Anatolia)
- Coordinates: 38.2568°N 33.4458°E
- Country: Turkey
- Province: Aksaray
- District: Eskil
- Population (2021): 2,643
- Time zone: UTC+3 (TRT)

Eşmekaya is a town (belde) and municipality in the Eskil District, Aksaray Province, Turkey. Its population is 2,643 (2021).
