= Eskil =

- Municipality
- Location within Turkey Location within Turkey Central Anatolia
- Coordinates: 38°24′06″N 33°24′47″E
- Country: Turkey
- Province: Aksaray
- District: Eskil

Government
  - Mayor: Necati Belgemen (AKP)
- Elevation: 932 m (3,058 ft)
- Population (2021): 17,929
- Time zone: UTC+3 (TRT)
- Postal code: 68800
- Area code: 0382
- Website: www.eskil.bel.tr

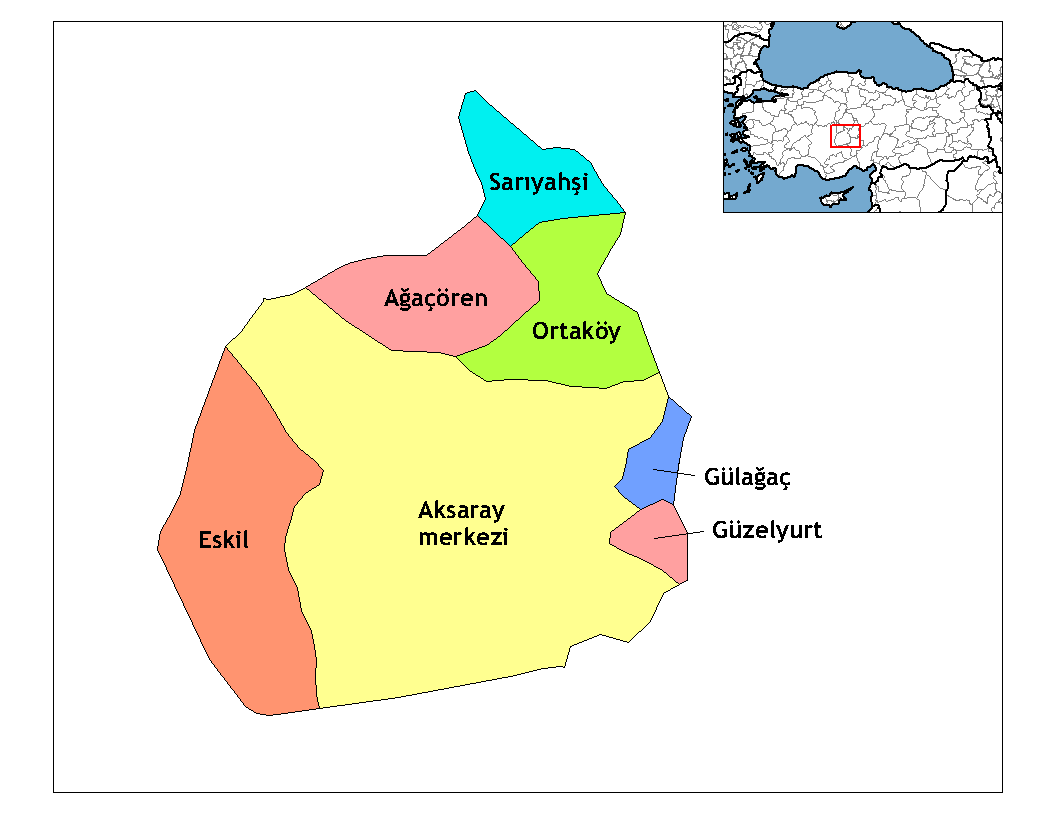
Map of the districts of Aksaray province in Turkey.

Eskil is a town in Aksaray Province in the Central Anatolia region of Turkey, situated on the southern shore of Lake Tuz. It is the seat of Eskil District. Its population is 17,929 (2021). The average elevation in the center is 932 m (3,058 ft).

== History ==
The history of the region dates back to the Old Bronze Age (3rd millennium BC).

The first place of establishment of Eskil, which is mostly referred to as "Old province" in ancient sources, is today known as Gavuroreni and is located in the far north of the district, near Salt Lake. With the Anatolian Seljuk domination, Sultan II. The region was Turkified by placing Turkish tribes in Eskil and its surroundings by Kılıçarslan.

It is stated in the Ottoman Avekaleilayşivi Provincial Writings book of the Presidency that it was centered on the Esk-Kâlen Kazalar group, which was affiliated with the Eskil'in Eyalman' Province during the Ottomans. Historical ruins can be found in Eskil, which has large settlements. There are mounds in Böğet Village, Ortakuyu, Köşk, Hüyüklü, Mutlu, Çulfa, Sağsak and Tosun Highlands, and remains of architectural artifacts are found.
