= Ceritler =

Rural neighborhood in Aladağ District, Adana Province, Turkey

- Neighbourhood
- Location in Turkey
- Coordinates: 37.4692°N 35.3875°E
- Country: Turkey
- Province: Adana
- District: Aladağ
- Population (2022): 1,141
- Time zone: UTC+3 (TRT)

Ceritler is a neighbourhood in the municipality and district of Aladağ, Adana Province, Turkey. Its population is 1,141 (2022).
