= Karahan, Aladağ =

Karahan
- Neighbourhood
- Location in Turkey
- Coordinates: 37.5849°N 35.5308°E
- Country: Turkey
- Province: Adana
- District: Aladağ
- Population (2022): 156
- Time zone: UTC+3 (TRT)

Karahan is a neighbourhood in the municipality and district of Aladağ, Adana Province, Turkey. Its population is 156 (2022).
