= Mazılık =

- Neighbourhood
- Location in Turkey
- Coordinates: 37.4815°N 35.4536°E
- Country: Turkey
- Province: Adana
- District: Aladağ
- Population (2022): 88
- Time zone: UTC+3 (TRT)

Mazılık is a neighbourhood in the municipality and district of Aladağ, Adana Province, Turkey. Its population is 88 (2022). The most direct route from Adana is via Imamoğlu.

The village of Mazılık is at the site of a once thriving late antique/Byzantine settlement. In 1982 an archaeological assessment and accurate plan of the small, but impressive basilica were published. The church consists of an apse, flanking apsidioles, and a two-storey rectangular nave with now collapsed upper-level galleries. It probably dates back to the late 5th to the early 6th century A.D. An extensive photographic survey and plan was completed for this publication.
