= Akören, Aladağ =

Akören
- Neighbourhood
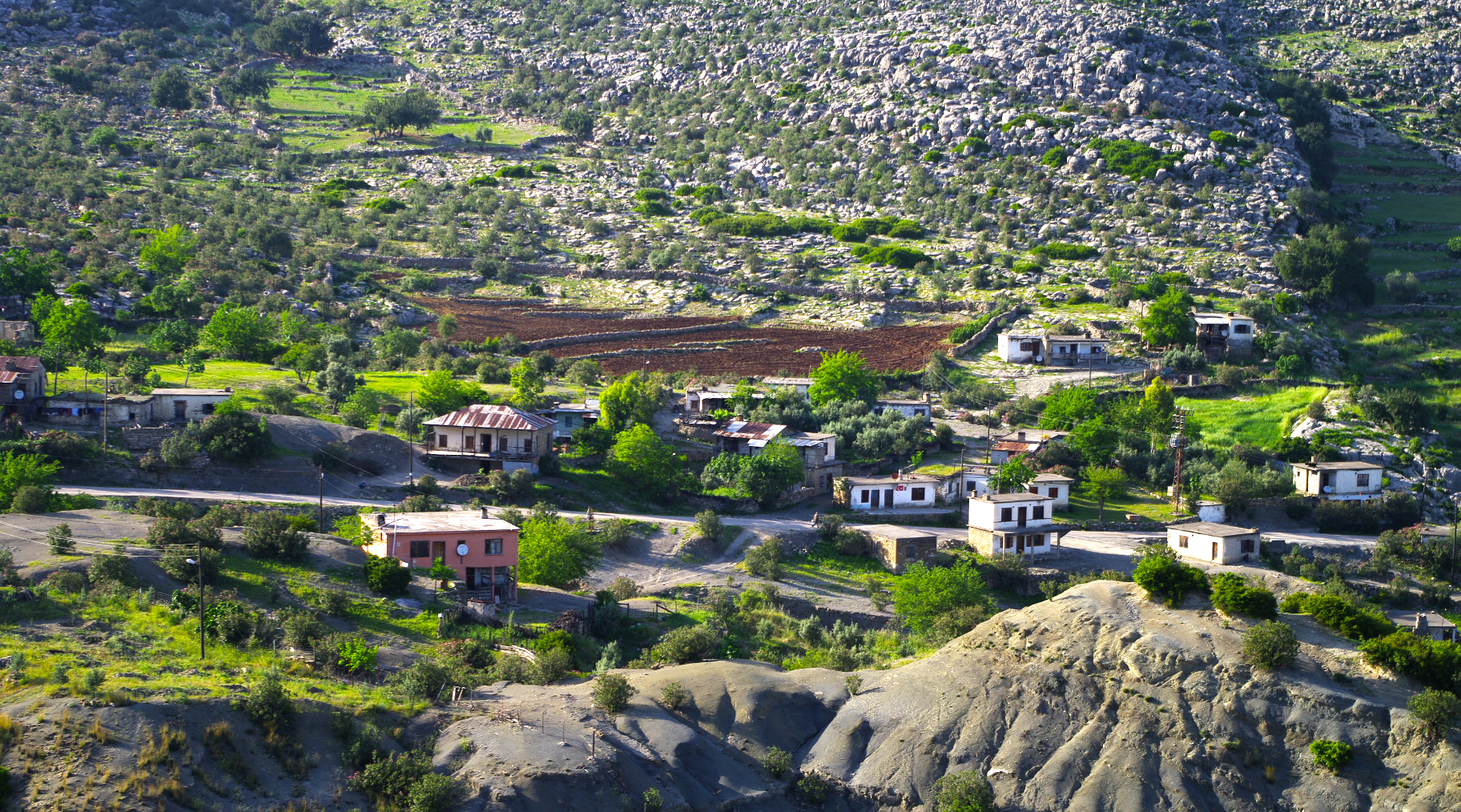
- A view from Yenimahalle zone of Akören

- Location within Turkey
- Coordinates: 37.4538°N 35.4458°E
- Country: Turkey
- Province: Adana
- District: Aladağ

Government
  - Muhtar: Muafak Yılmazoğlu
- Population (2022): 906
- Time zone: UTC+3 (TRT)

Akören is a neighbourhood of the municipality and district of Aladağ, Adana Province, Turkey. Its population is 906 (2022). Before the 2013 reorganisation, it was a town (belde). Muafak Yılmazoğlu was its muhtar as of 2024.

== History ==
The village is known to have existed in the ancient Roman times. The ruins of this ancient settlement still exist and the village is officially classified as an archaeological site. The site hosts four surviving churches and avenues. The settlement consists of two separate neighbourhoods, one with around 30 houses called Akören 1 or Göveren, other with around 50 houses called Akören 2. Akören 1 encompasses a Byzantine church at the centre of the village, on which the date 572 is inscribed. This part hosts several historic stones, some of which were used for the extraction of oils. In the northwest of Akören 2 lies another church and a number of inscriptions and a Byzantine graveyard with burial chambers. On one inscription, the date of 170 AD is written.

In 1928, the village was known as "Akevren". By 1946, the name of the village had changed to "Akören".

== Geography ==
The village is located 20 km away from Aladağ and 81 km from the city of Adana. It is located in the Taurus Mountains.
