= Darılık =

- Neighbourhood
- Location in Turkey
- Coordinates: 37°35′N 35°28′E
- Country: Turkey
- Province: Adana
- District: Aladağ
- Population (2022): 103
- Time zone: UTC+3 (TRT)

Darılık is a neighbourhood in the municipality and district of Aladağ, Adana Province, Turkey. Its population was 103 in (2022).
