= Bayramdüğün, Eskil =

Bayramdüğün
- Village
- Location within Turkey Location within Turkey Central Anatolia
- Coordinates: 38.1271°N 33.2990°E
- Country: Turkey
- Province: Aksaray
- District: Eskil
- Population (2021): 380
- Time zone: UTC+3 (TRT)

Bayramdüğün is a village in the Eskil District, Aksaray Province, Turkey. Its population is 380 (2021).
