= Büğet, Eskil =

Büğet
- Village
- Location within Turkey Location within Turkey Central Anatolia
- Coordinates: 38.3216°N 33.4542°E
- Country: Turkey
- Province: Aksaray
- District: Eskil
- Population (2021): 691
- Time zone: UTC+3 (TRT)

Büğet is a village in the Eskil District, Aksaray Province, Turkey. Its population is 691 (2021).
