= Gümüşdüğün, Eskil =

Gümüşdüğün
- Village
- Location within Turkey Location within Turkey Central Anatolia
- Country: Turkey
- Province: Aksaray
- District: Eskil
- Population (2024): 252
- Time zone: UTC+3 (TRT)

Gümüşdüğün is a village in the Eskil District, Aksaray Province, Turkey. Its population is 252 (2024).
