= Güneşli, Eskil =

Güneşli
- Village
- Location within Turkey Location within Turkey Central Anatolia
- Coordinates: 38.1451°N 33.5025°E
- Country: Turkey
- Province: Aksaray
- District: Eskil
- Population (2021): 1,614
- Time zone: UTC+3 (TRT)

Güneşli is a village in the Eskil District, Aksaray Province, Turkey. Its population is 1,614 (2021).
