= Celil, Eskil =

Celil
- Village
- Location within Turkey Location within Turkey Central Anatolia
- Coordinates: 38°15′30″N 33°18′30″E
- Country: Turkey
- Province: Aksaray
- District: Eskil
- Population (2021): 420
- Time zone: UTC+3 (TRT)

Celil is a village in the Eskil District, Aksaray Province, Turkey. Its population is 420 (2021).
