= Büyüksofulu =

- Neighbourhood
- Location in Turkey
- Coordinates: 37°33′N 35°09′E
- Country: Turkey
- Province: Adana
- District: Aladağ
- Elevation: 913 m (2,995 ft)
- Population (2022): 1,692
- Time zone: UTC+3 (TRT)

Büyüksofulu is a neighbourhood in the municipality and district of Aladağ, Adana Province, Turkey. Its population is 1,692 (2022). It is situated in the Taurus Mountains to the west of Aladağ and to the north of Adana. Its distance to Aladağ is 28 kilometres (17 mi) and its distance to Adana is 110 kilometres (68 mi). In addition to agriculture, forestry and chrome mining are among the villages revenues.
