= Kıcak =

- Neighbourhood
- Location in Turkey
- Coordinates: 37°34′N 35°12′E
- Country: Turkey
- Province: Adana
- District: Aladağ
- Population (2022): 861
- Time zone: UTC+3 (TRT)

Kıcak is a neighbourhood in the municipality and district of Aladağ, Adana Province, Turkey. Its population is 861 (2022).
