= Köprücük, Aladağ =

Köprücük
- Neighbourhood
- Country: Turkey
- Province: Adana
- District: Aladağ
- Population (2022): 311
- Time zone: UTC+3 (TRT)

Köprücük is a neighbourhood in the municipality and district of Aladağ, Adana Province, Turkey. Its population is 311 (2022).
