= Dayılar, Aladağ =

Dayılar
- Neighbourhood
- Location in Turkey
- Coordinates: 37.4499°N 35.4927°E
- Country: Turkey
- Province: Adana
- District: Aladağ
- Population (2022): 132
- Time zone: UTC+3 (TRT)

Dayılar (also: Dailer) is a neighbourhood in the municipality and district of Aladağ, Adana Province, Turkey. Its population is 132 (2022).
