= Kışlak, Aladağ =

Kışlak
- Neighbourhood
- Location in Turkey
- Coordinates: 37.6319°N 35.5427°E
- Country: Turkey
- Province: Adana
- District: Aladağ
- Population (2022): 175
- Time zone: UTC+3 (TRT)

Kışlak is a neighbourhood in the municipality and district of Aladağ, Adana Province, Turkey. Its population is 175 (2022).
