= Uzunkuyu, Aladağ =

Uzunkuyu
- Neighbourhood
- Location in Turkey
- Coordinates: 37.4881°N 35.4725°E
- Country: Turkey
- Province: Adana
- District: Aladağ
- Population (2022): 198
- Time zone: UTC+3 (TRT)

Uzunkuyu is a neighbourhood in the municipality and district of Aladağ, Adana Province, Turkey. Its population is 198 (2022).
