= Boztahta, Aladağ =

Boztahta
- Neighbourhood
- Location in Turkey
- Coordinates: 37.3694°N 35.4602°E
- Country: Turkey
- Province: Adana
- District: Aladağ
- Population (2022): 234
- Time zone: UTC+3 (TRT)

Boztahta is a neighbourhood in the municipality and district of Aladağ, Adana Province, Turkey.

== Demographics ==
Its population is 234 (2022).
