= Lake Tuz =

Lake in Turkey

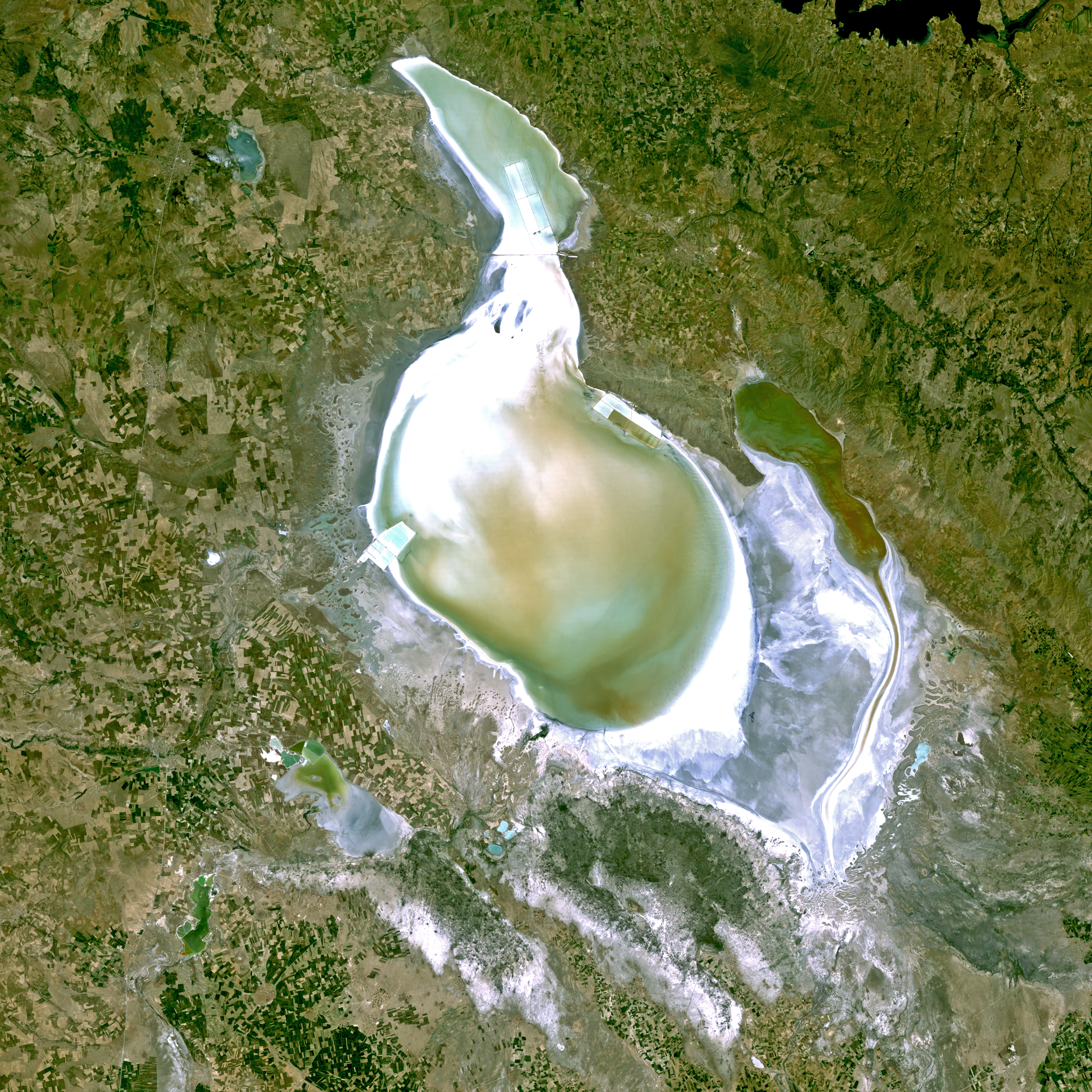
- View from space

- Location within Turkey
- Location: Central Anatolia
- Coordinates: 38°44′N 33°23′E
- Type: endorheic hypersaline
- Primary inflows: Peçenek Çayı, Melendiz Çayı
- Primary outflows: none
- Catchment area: 11,900 km^{2} (4,600 sq mi)
- Basin countries: Turkey
- Max. length: 80 km (50 mi)
- Max. width: 50 km (31 mi)
- Surface area: 1,600 km^{2} (620 sq mi)
- Average depth: 0.5 m (2 ft)
- Max. depth: 1.5 m (5 ft)
- Surface elevation: 905 m (2,969 ft)
- Settlements: Şereflikoçhisar, Eskil

Lake Tuz (Turkish: Tuz Gölü, 'Salt Lake'), is the second largest lake in Turkey with its 1,665 km^{2} (643 mi^{2}) surface area and one of the largest hypersaline lakes in the world. It is located in the Central Anatolia Region, 105 km (65 mi) northeast of Konya, 150 km (93 mi) south-southeast of Ankara and 57 km (35 mi) northwest of Aksaray. In recent years, Lake Tuz has become a hotspot for tourists. In October 2021, Lake Tuz temporarily dried up completely due to climate change and unsustainable irrigation practices.

== Geography ==
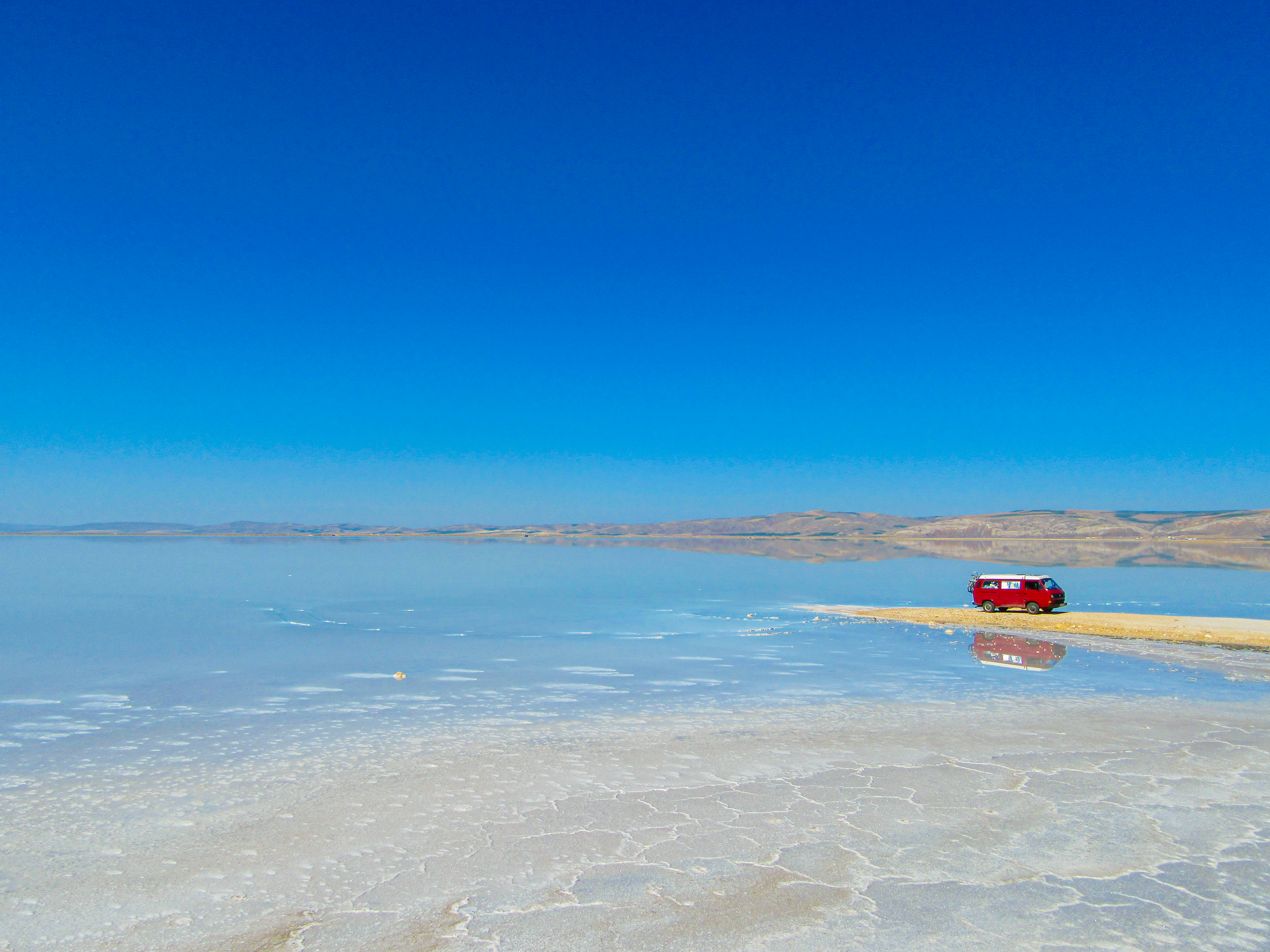
Salty shores of Lake Tuz

The lake, occupying a tectonic depression in the central plateau of Turkey, is fed by two major streams, groundwater, and surface water, but has no outlet. Brackish marshes have formed where channels and streams enter the lake. Arable fields surround the lake, except in the south and southwest, where there is an extensive seasonally flooded salt-steppe.

For most of the year, it is very shallow (approx.0.4 m (1 ft)). During winter part of the salt is dissolved in the fresh water that is introduced to the lake by precipitation and surface runoff (to 32-34% salinity). During the summer the lake dries up exposing an average of 30cm thick salt layer in August. This mechanism is used as a basis for the process of the salt mines in the lake. The three mines operating in the lake produce 63% of the salt consumed in Turkey. The salt mining generates industrial activity in the region, mainly related to salt processing and refining.

== Geology ==
=== Formation ===
Subsidence in the Tuz Gölü Lower Basin occurred during the Upper Senonian-Lower Middle Eocene and was followed by a regression that started in the upper Eocene and continued until the end of the Oligocene. During the Upper Senonian-Lower Middle Eocene, the Tuz Gölü Lower Basin formed a single and continuous depression towards the north with the Haymana region. The Haymana Basin, which rose after the deposition of the Middle Eocene Nummulitic limestones, separated the Tuz Gölü Basin with a fault zone along the eastern edge of the Karacadağ uplift.

The connection of Tuz Gölü with the north-northeast Çankırı basin occurred during the Pliocene period and continued throughout the Middle Eocene-Oligocene, when the lake basin became a graben bounded by the north-west and north-east fault zones. After the main deformation in the late Oligocene or Miocene period, local depositional basins were formed during the Neogene period, and volcanics of varying thickness and terrestrial sediments including lake limestones were deposited in these basins. The Tuz Gölü Basin has been little affected by the recent Alpine compressional movements in the Pliocene. Tension movements that took place in the Neogene and continued until the Pliocene caused volcanic activities dating back to historical times.

=== Geological structure ===
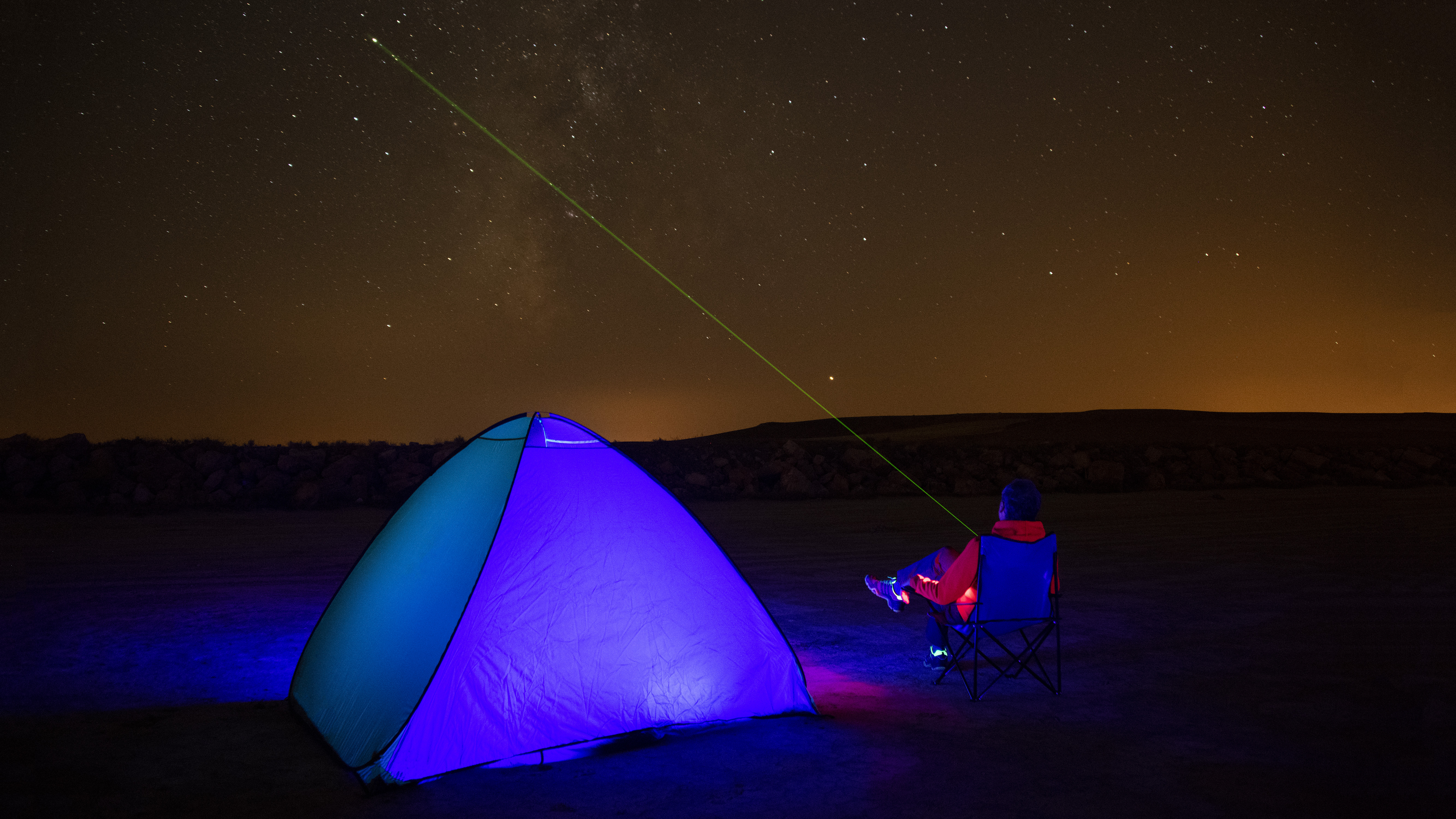
Long exposure night sky in Tuz Gölu

In the geological structure of the lake, there is a salt layer of different densities that continues continuously for 1,000 meters. This layer ensures the continuity of salt production around the lake, in other words, it extends the commercial life of the salt industry in the region.

In the Tuz Gölü Basin, there is a 10 km-thick stacking with age varying from the Upper Cretaceous to the present. While units such as shale, sandstone, pebble stone and limestone, which generally have flysch character and interact with each other in vertical and lateral directions, were deposited in the deep parts of the basin, it was revealed by the researchers that terrestrial and shallow marine units in the marginal parts were also deposited.

Conglomerate and sandstones, which are high energy products, were deposited in shallow marine and terrestrial environments, and shale, limestone, gypsum and anhydrites were formed in calm periods. The basement rock units, Temirözü, Mollaresul formations, Ankara complex and Kırşehir crystalline complex in the north and northeast of the Tuz Gölü Basin, and low-grade metamorphics in the west and southwest constitute.

=== Climate ===
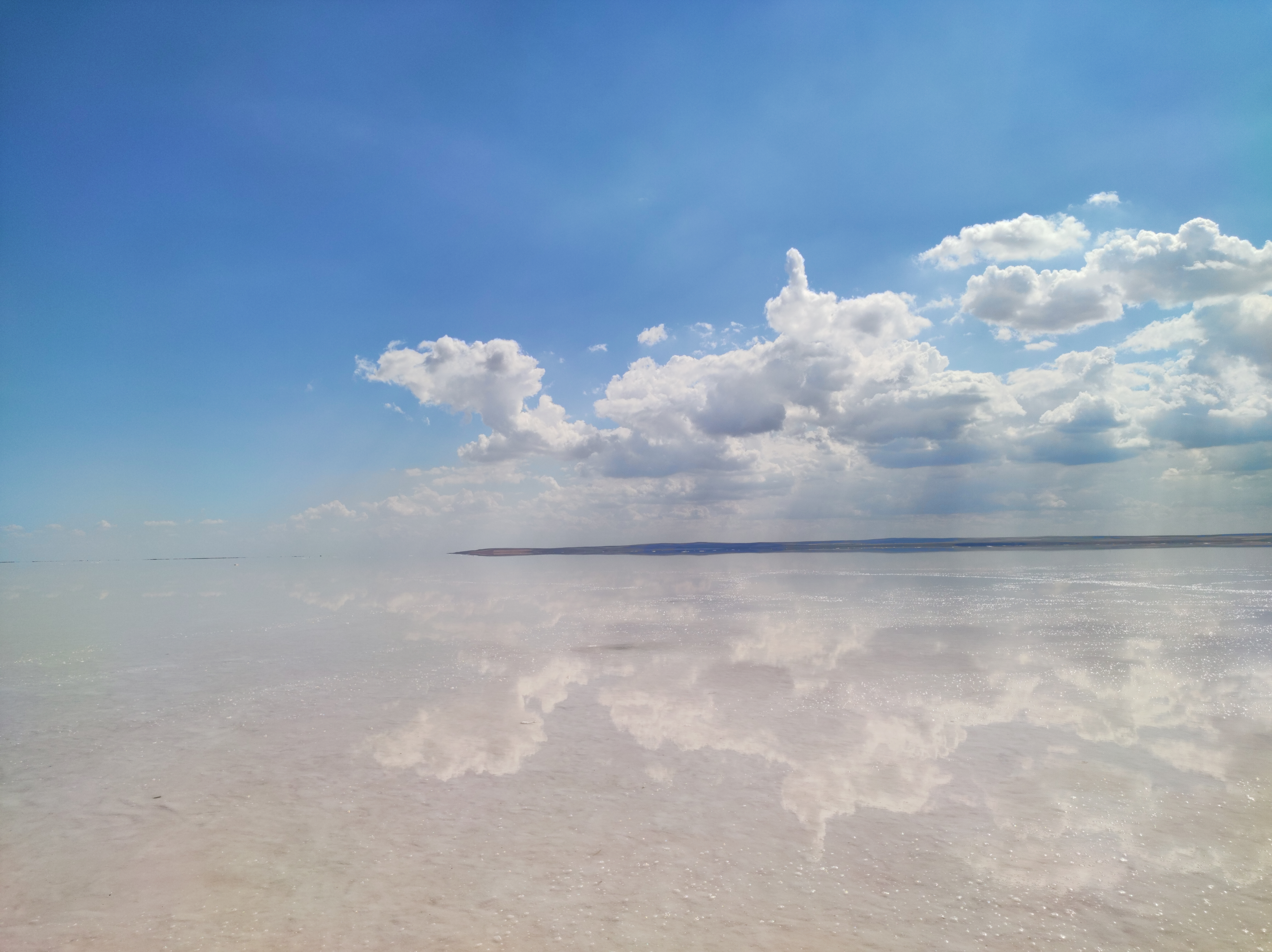
Climate of Lake Tuz

The basin of Lake Tuz is influenced by cold semi-arid (BSk) and humid continental (Dsa and Dsb) climates. Northern areas of the basin such as Kulu are wetter and show humid continental characteristics, meanwhile more southern areas like Çumra, Aksaray and Karapınar have a steppe climate. The area is generally sheltered from moisture-bearing air masses behind the Taurus Mountains. The average yearly precipitation in the basin is 324 mm, thus making the region one of the driest in Turkey.

Climate data for Şereflikoçhisar (northeastern shore)
Month	Jan	Feb	Mar	Apr	May	Jun	Jul	Aug	Sep	Oct	Nov	Dec	Year
Mean daily maximum °C (°F)	3.7 (38.7)	6.5 (43.7)	11.4 (52.5)	16.8 (62.2)	21.3 (70.3)	25.8 (78.4)	29.3 (84.7)	29.1 (84.4)	25.5 (77.9)	19.1 (66.4)	12.3 (54.1)	6 (43)	17.2 (63.0)
Daily mean °C (°F)	−0.2 (31.6)	1.9 (35.4)	5.8 (42.4)	10.6 (51.1)	14.7 (58.5)	18.6 (65.5)	21.9 (71.4)	21.5 (70.7)	17.9 (64.2)	12.4 (54.3)	6.7 (44.1)	2.1 (35.8)	11.2 (52.1)
Mean daily minimum °C (°F)	−4.1 (24.6)	−2.8 (27.0)	.1 (32.2)	4.4 (39.9)	8.1 (46.6)	11.4 (52.5)	14.4 (57.9)	13.9 (57.0)	10.2 (50.4)	5.6 (42.1)	1.1 (34.0)	−1.8 (28.8)	5.0 (41.1)
Average precipitation mm (inches)	55 (2.2)	47 (1.9)	49 (1.9)	52 (2.0)	48 (1.9)	22 (0.9)	6 (0.2)	4 (0.2)	10 (0.4)	25 (1.0)	40 (1.6)	62 (2.4)	420 (16.6)

== History ==
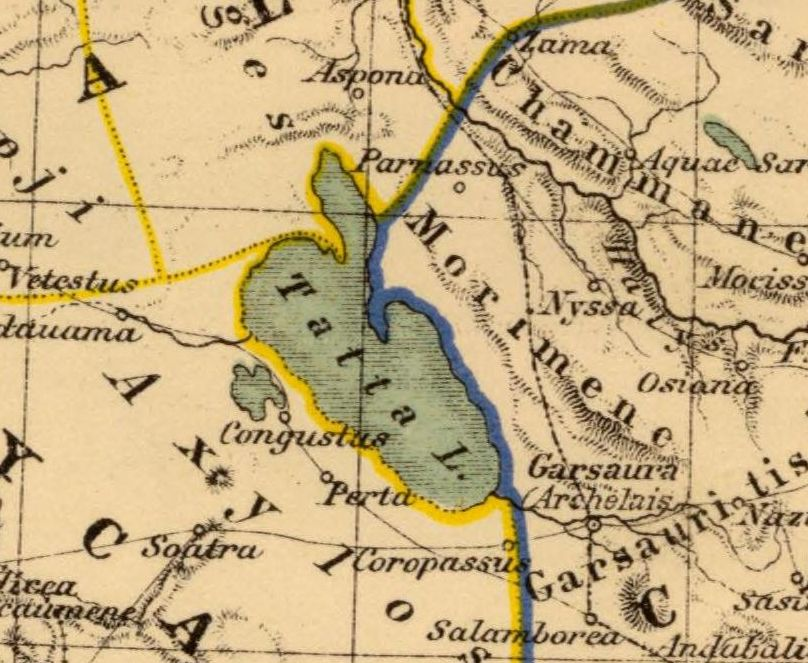
Map of Lake Tatta in ancient times

In antiquity, Lake Tuz was known as Tatta and was situated on the frontier between ancient Lycaonia and Galatia. Initially part of Phrygia, the region was later annexed into Lycaonia. Ancient sources described the lake as highly saline, with water so rich in brine that that any substance dipped into it, was immediately encrusted with a thick coat of salt; even birds flying near the surface had their wings moistened with the saline particles, so as to become incapable of rising into the air, and to be easily caught. Stephanus of Byzantium speaks of a salt lake in Phrygia, which he calls Attaea (Ἄτταια), near which there was a town called Botieum, tentatively linked to the modern settlements of Şereflikoçhisar or Eskil.

=== Pre-history ===
In prehistoric times, Lake Tatta was a vast freshwater lake significantly larger than its modern remnant. Numerous rivers fed into and drained from the lake, sustaining a rich ecosystem that dominated the Central Anatolian interior. The surrounding landscape was covered in dense vegetation, creating a fertile environment that supported some of the earliest known civilizations, including the Hittites and other Anatolian people. Archaeological evidence suggests that these early societies thrived along the lake's shores, relying on its abundant water resources for agriculture, fishing, and trade.

Following the last ice age between 11,000 and 5,000 years ago, the Central Anatolian steppe underwent significant changes. As global temperatures rose, precipitation patterns shifted, and many of the rivers that once sustained Lake Tatta either dried up or changed course. Over time, the lake gradually shrunk, its freshwater supply diminished, and its salinity increased. The once-lush landscape gave way to arid steppe, marking the transformation of the region into its modern semi-arid form. This gradual desiccation not only reshaped the lake but also impacted the civilizations that had once thrived in its proximity. As water sources dwindled, early Anatolian populations adapted by migrating, developing new water management techniques, or integrating into emerging urban centers elsewhere in the region as a part of the Holocene climatic optimum demographic shift.

== Flora and fauna ==
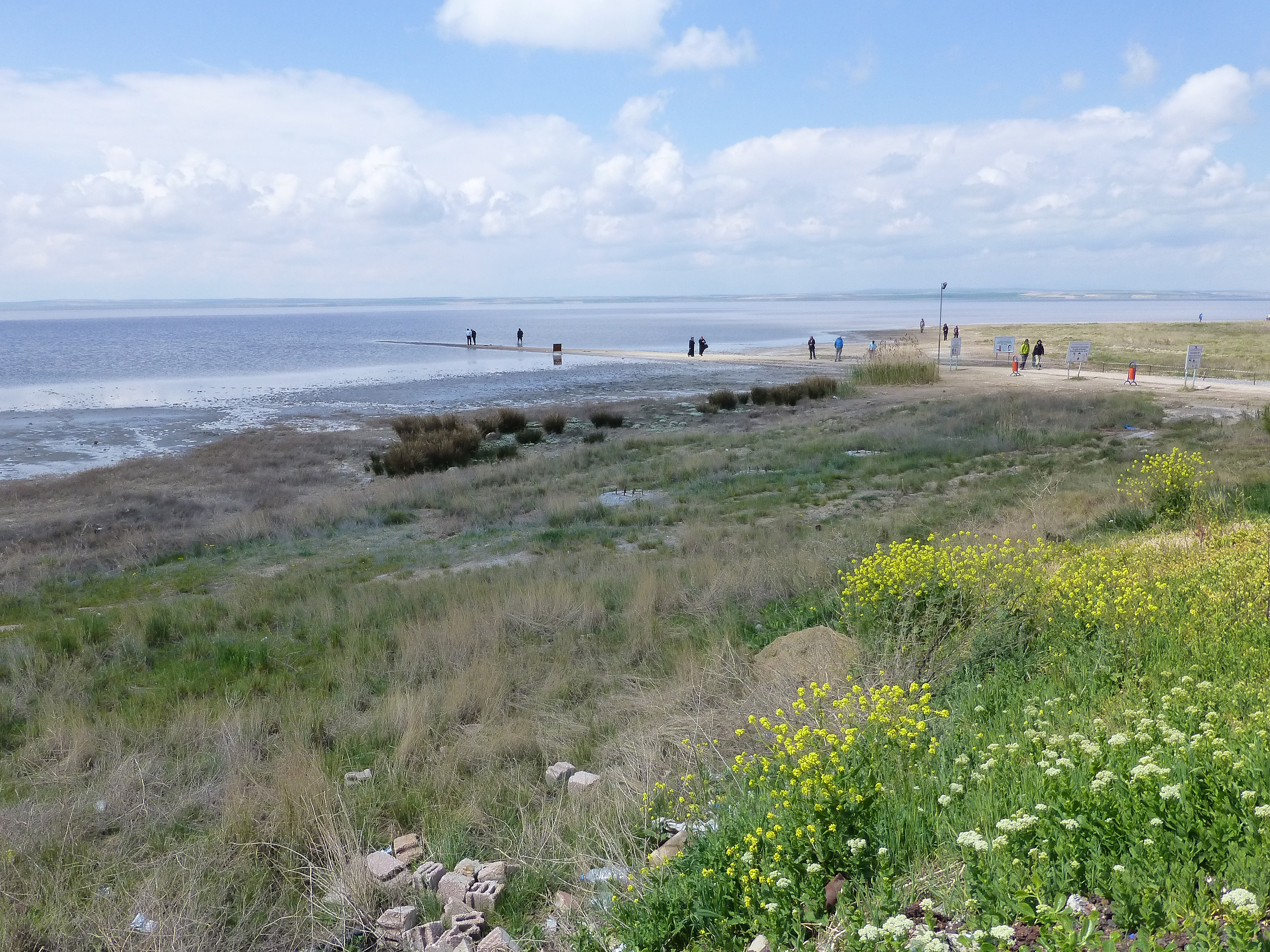
Flora of Lake Tuz

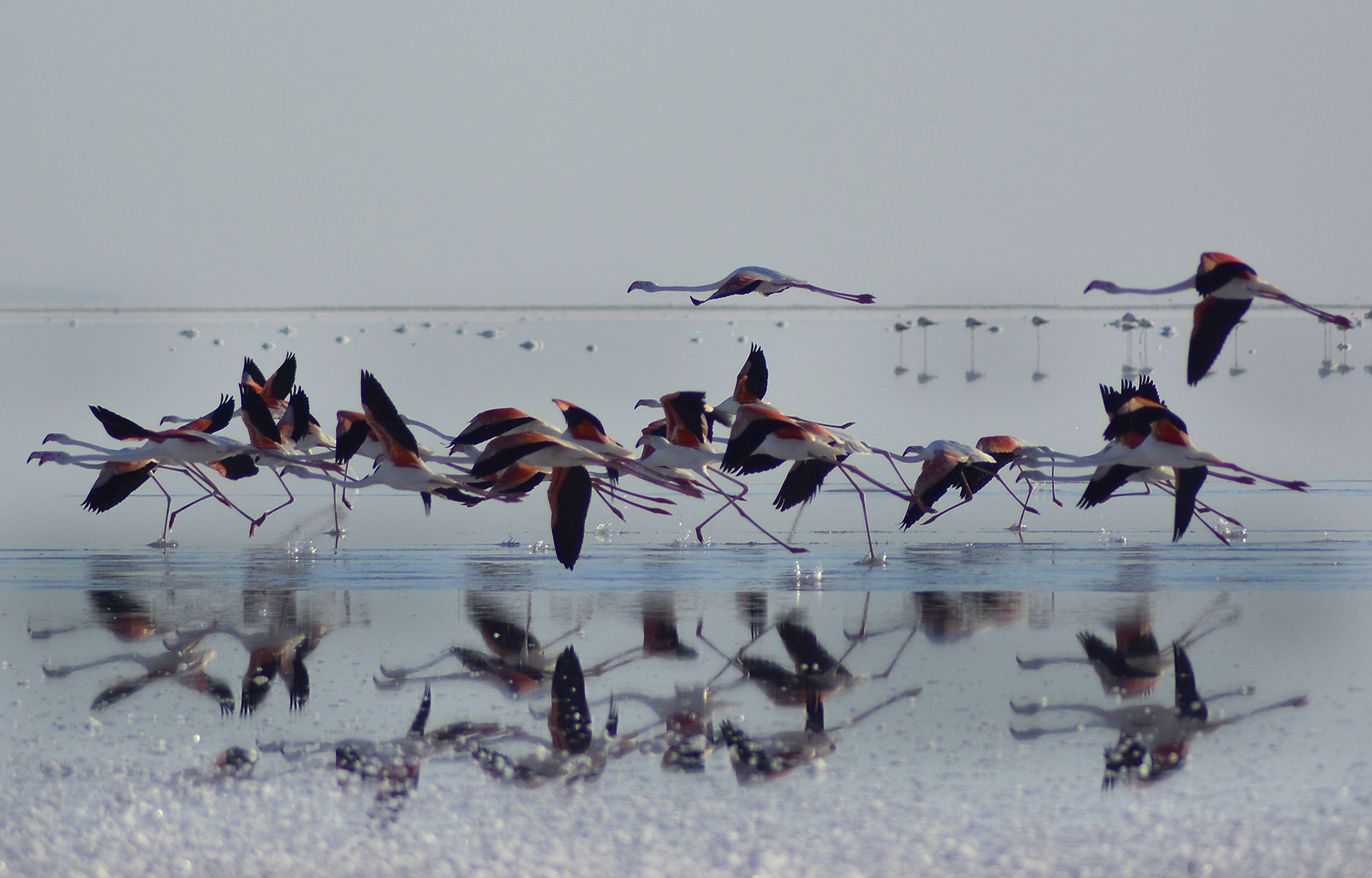
A group of flamingos flocking to Lake Tuz

In 2001, Lake Tuz was declared a specially protected area, including all of the lake surface and surrounding waterbeds and some of the important neighboring steppe areas. The main Turkish breeding colony of greater flamingo (Phoenicopterus roseus) is present on a group of islands in the southern part of the lake. Greater white-fronted goose (Anser albifrons) is the second largest breeder here. Lesser kestrel (Falco naumanni) is a common breeder in surrounding villages.

== Gallery ==
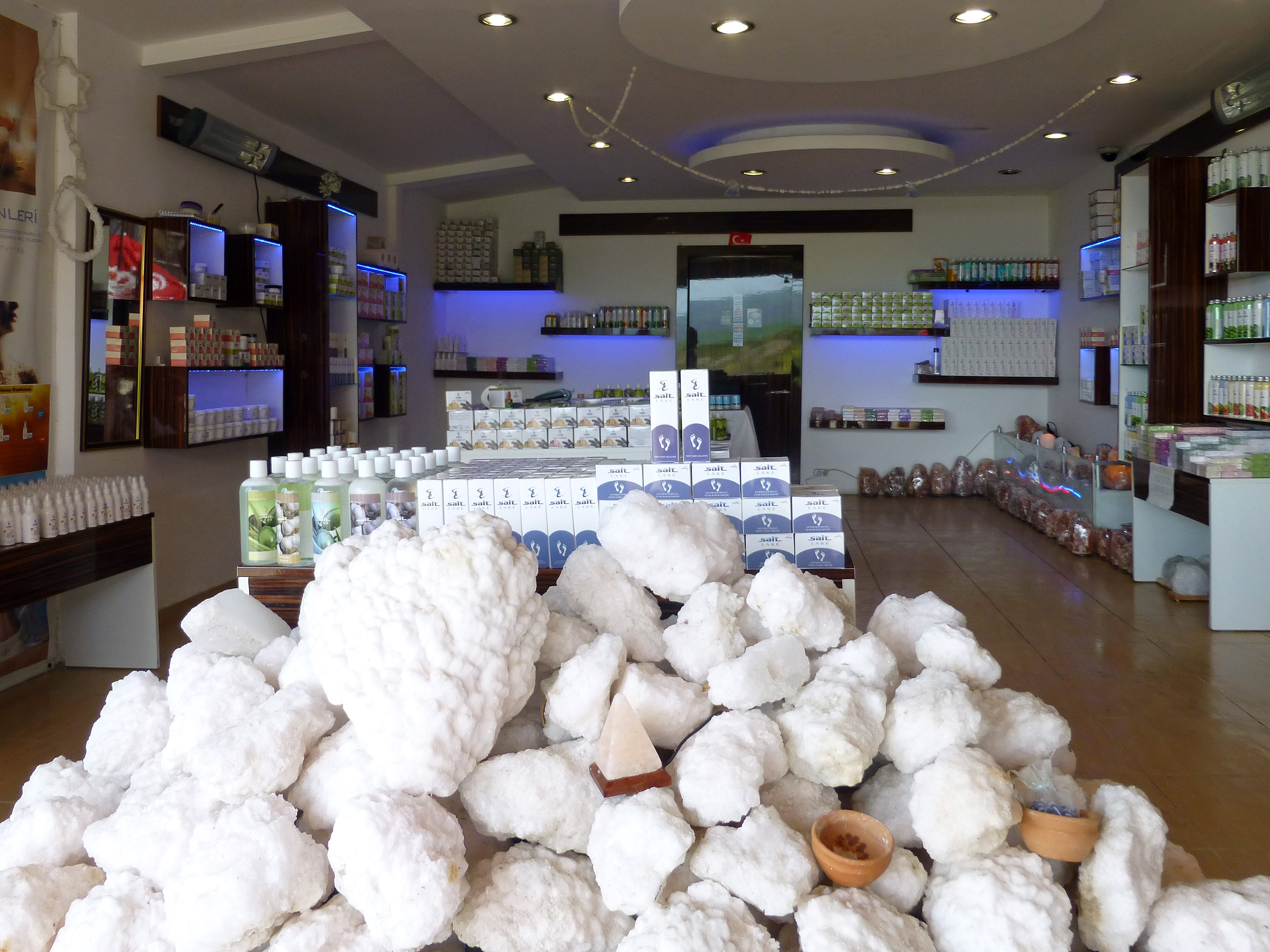
A gift shop near Lake Tuz

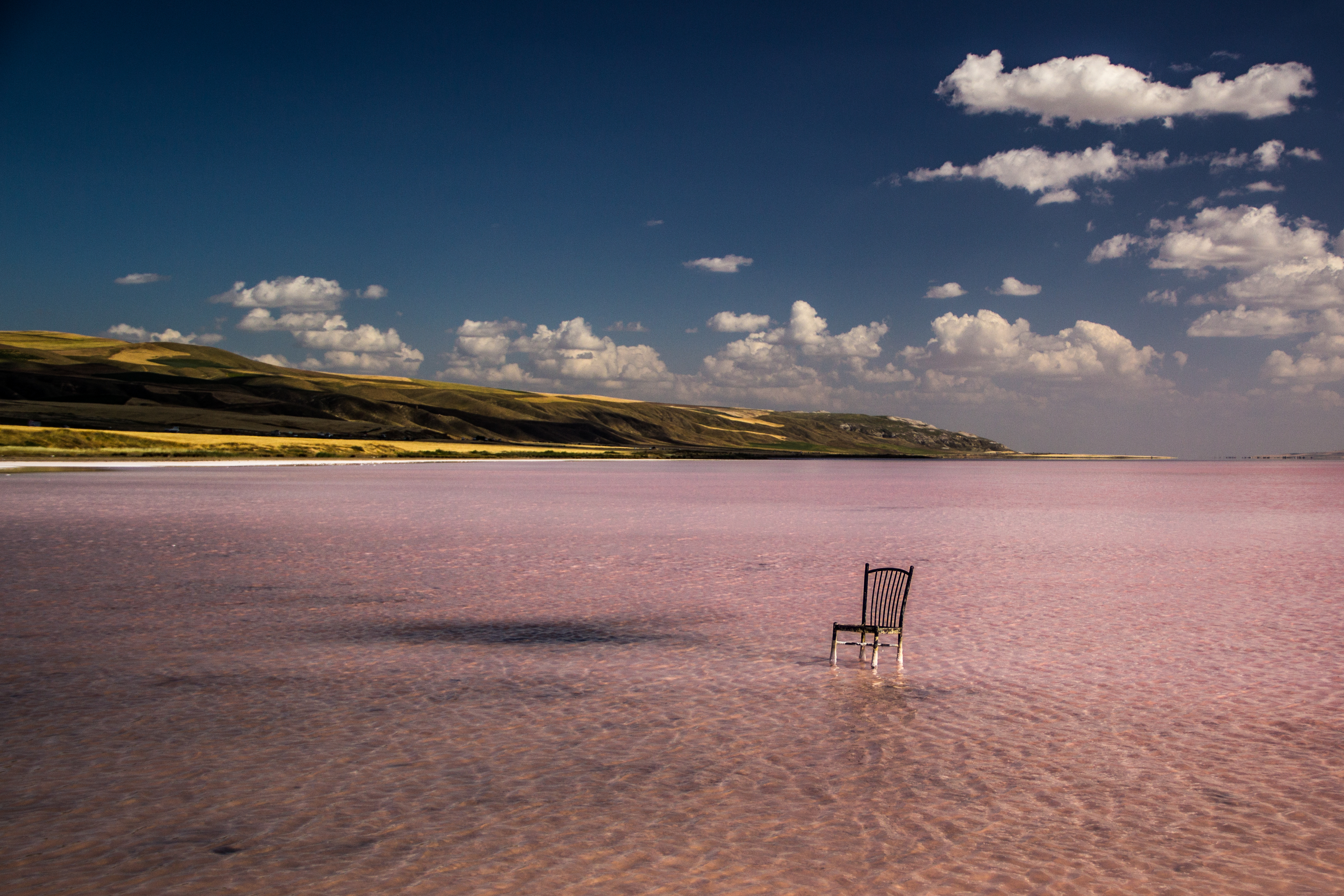
Empty chair at Lake Tuz

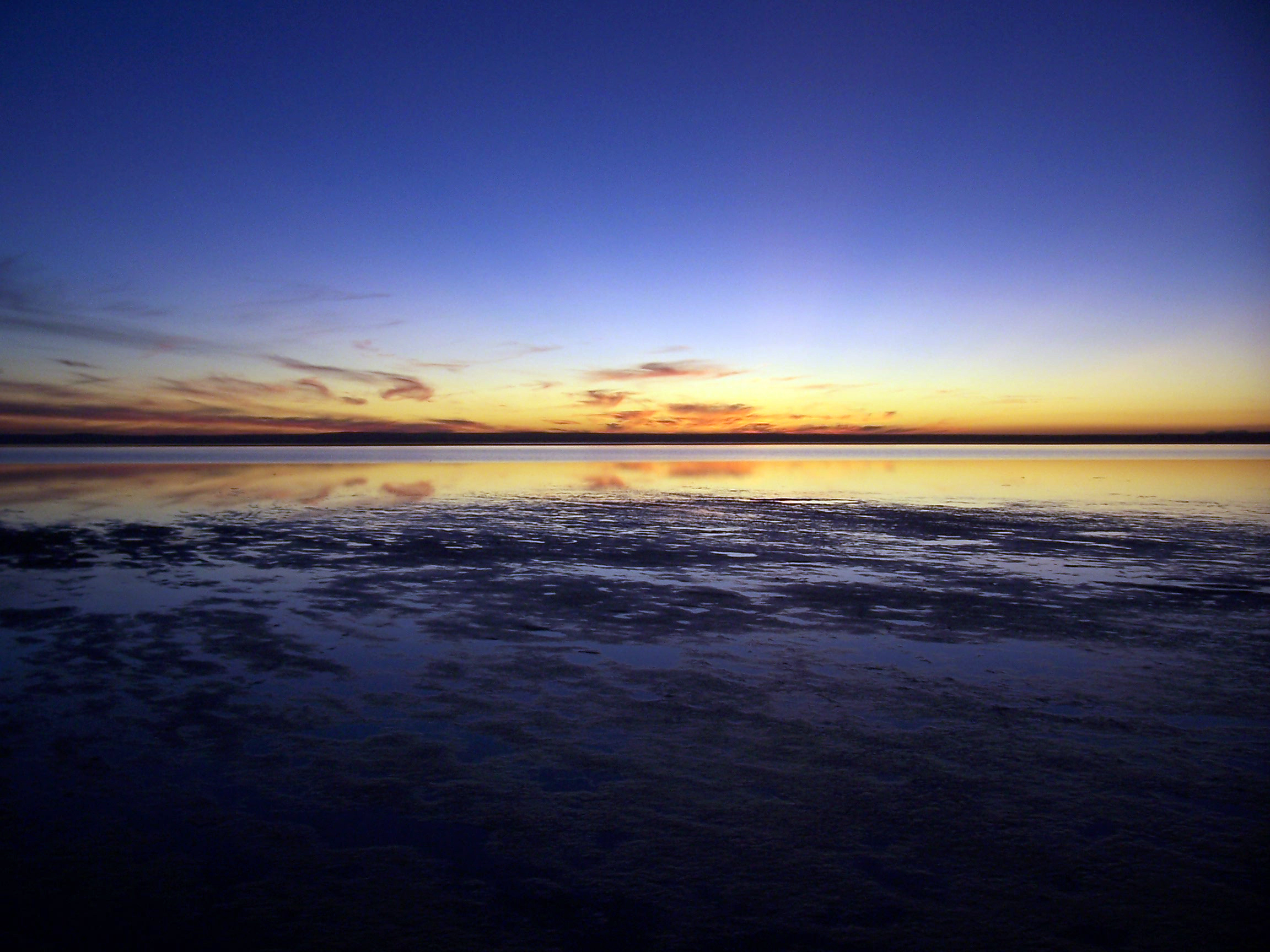
Lake Tuz at Sunset

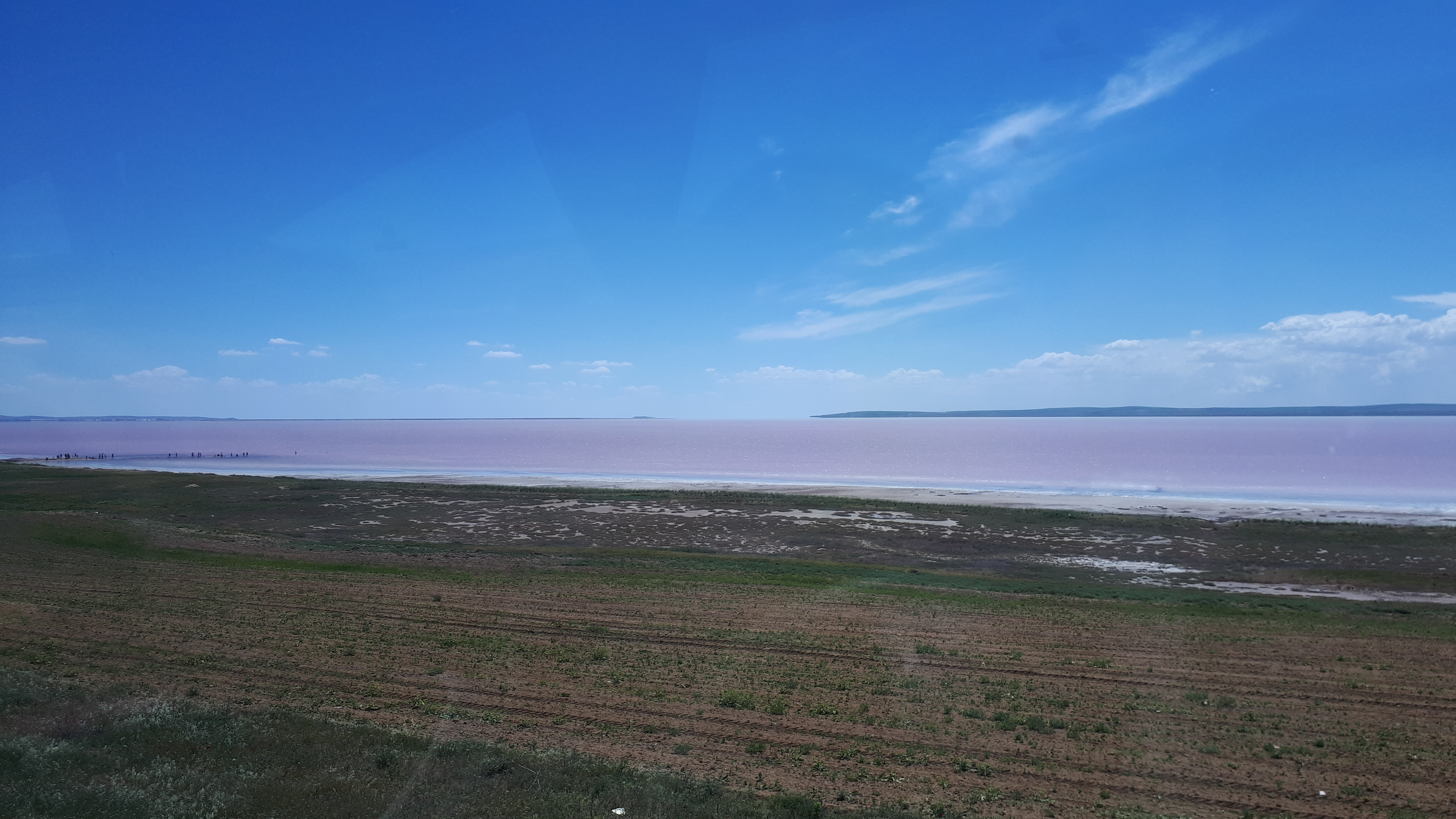
Lake Tuz seen from the road

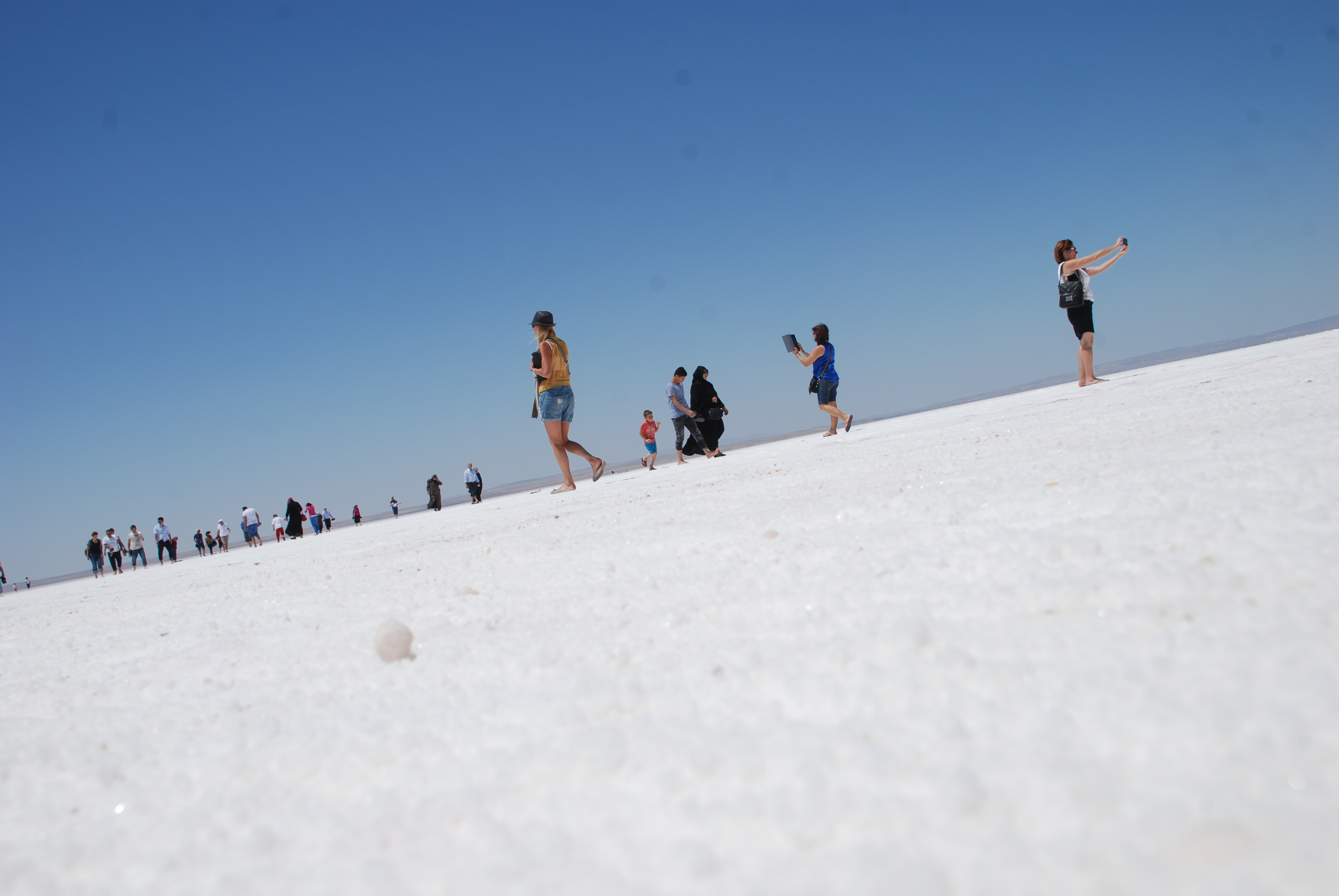
Tourists visiting Lake Tuz

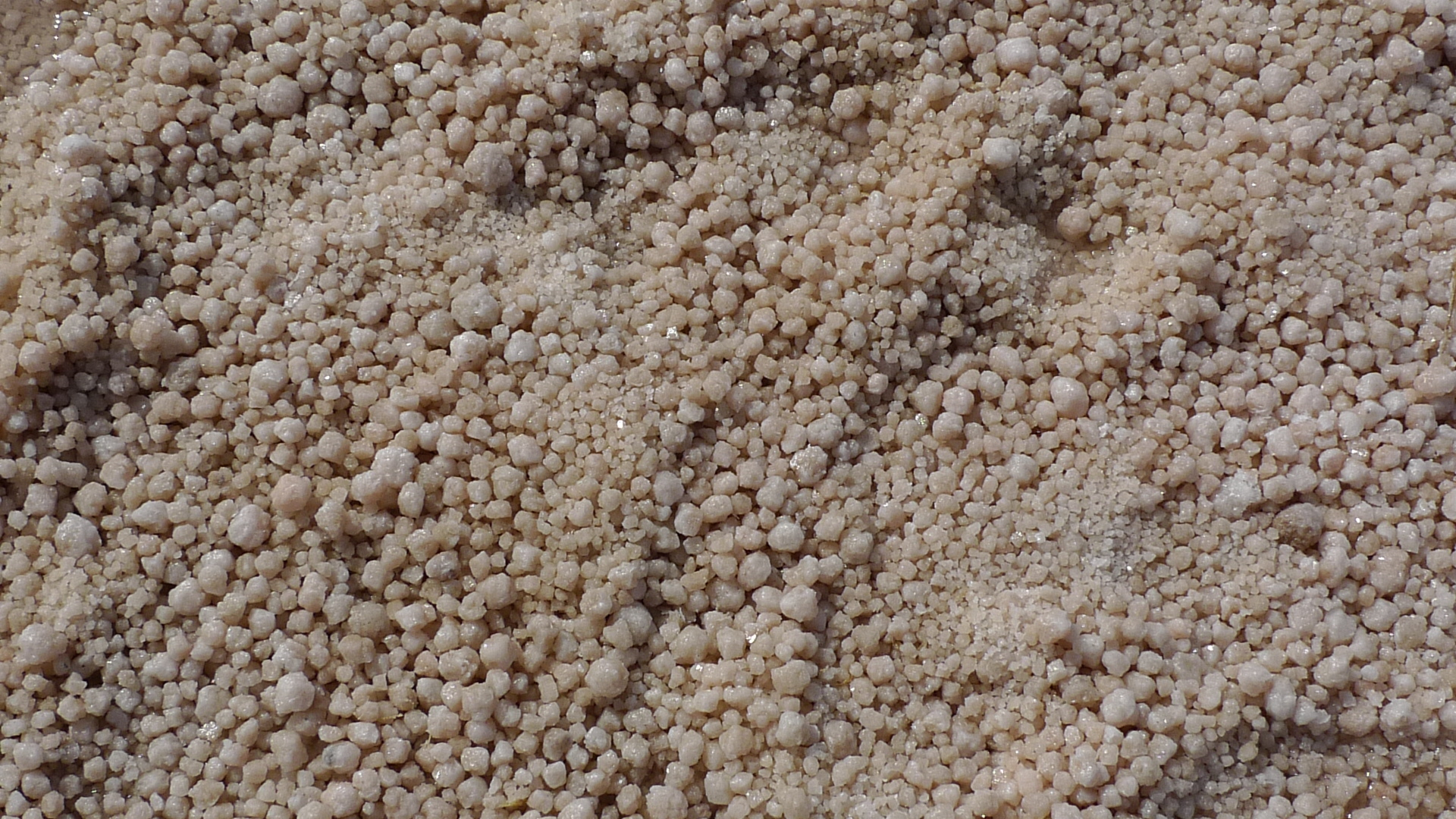
In the summer, the salt lake is transformed into a salt flat or playa.

== See also ==
- List of lakes of Turkey
- Lake Tuz Natural Gas Storage
