= Madenli, Aladağ =

Madenli
- Neighbourhood
- Location in Turkey
- Coordinates: 37°26′54″N 35°19′16″E
- Country: Turkey
- Province: Adana
- District: Aladağ
- Population (2022): 117
- Time zone: UTC+3 (TRT)

Madenli is a neighbourhood in the District of Aladağ in the Adana Province, Turkey. Its population is 117 (2022).
