= Aladağ, Adana =

Aladağ
- District and municipality
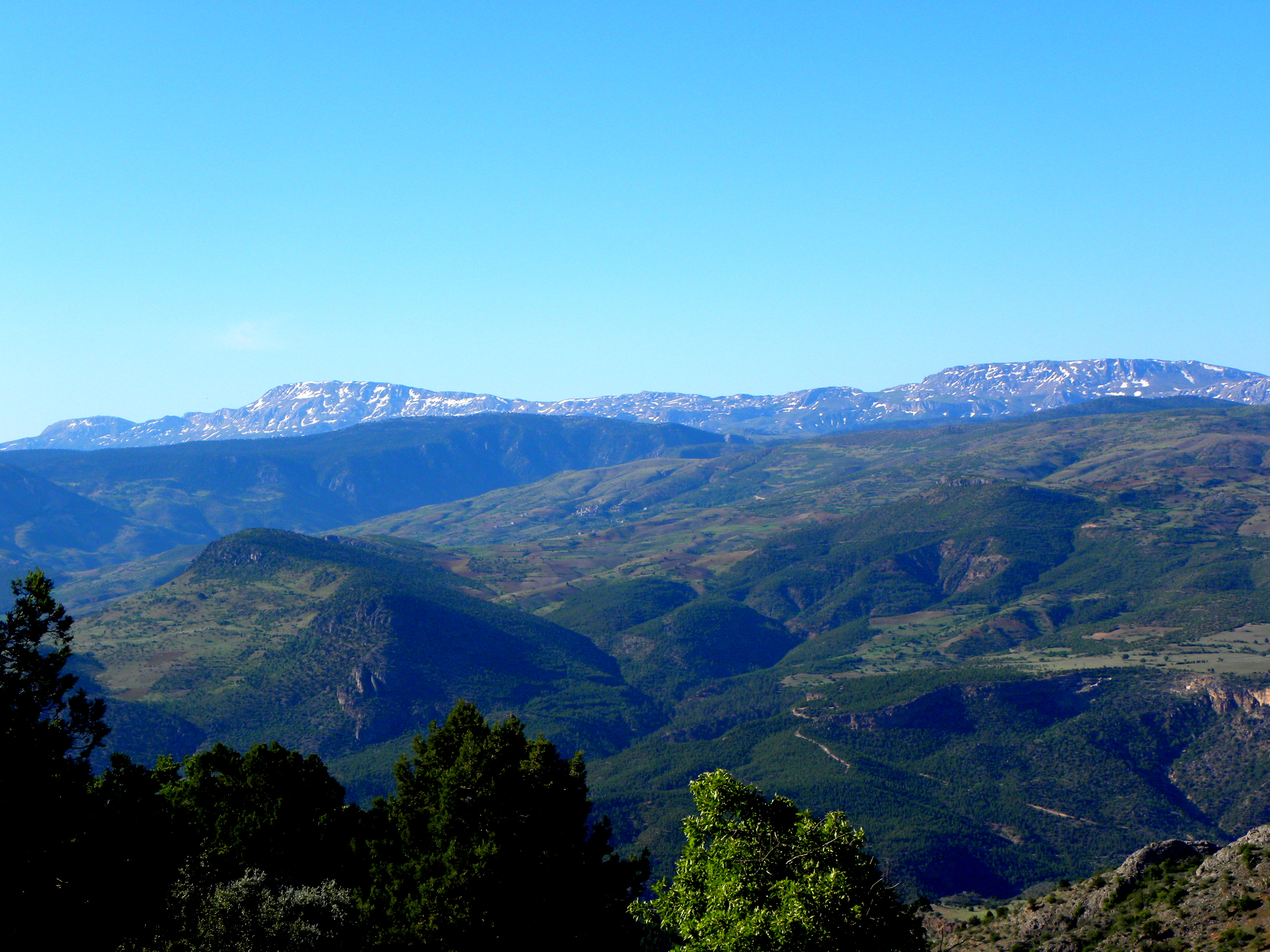

- Map showing Aladağ District in Adana Province

- Location within Turkey
- Coordinates: 37°32′47″N 35°23′55″E
- Country: Turkey
- Province: Adana

Government
  - Mayor: Kemal Özdemir (CHP)
- Area: 1,340 km^{2} (520 sq mi)
- Elevation: 921 m (3,022 ft)
- Population (2022): 15,897
  - Density: 11.9/km^{2} (30.7/sq mi)
- Time zone: UTC+3 (TRT)
- Postal code: 01720
- Area code: 0322
- Website: www.aladag.bel.tr

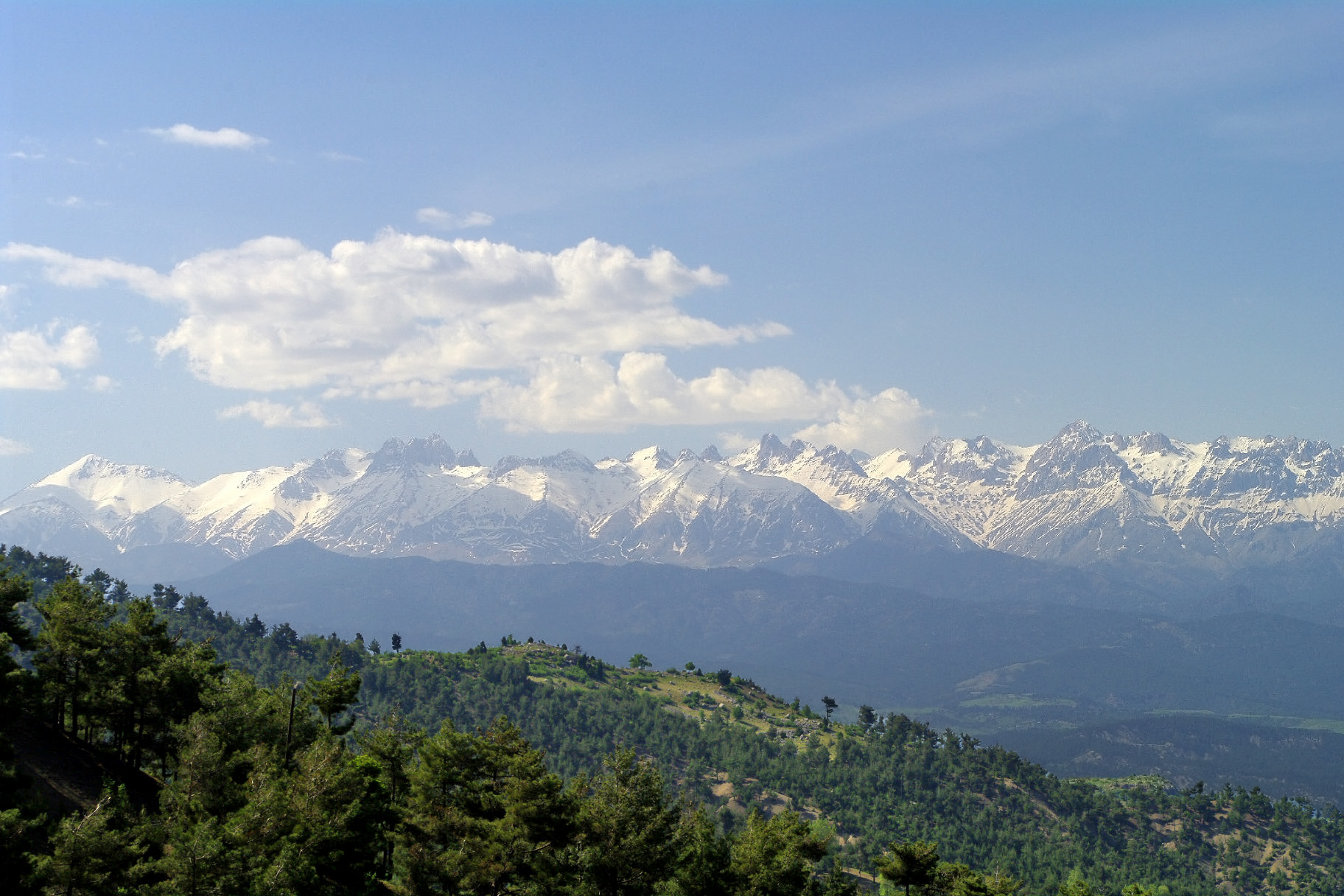
Mountains in Aladağ

Aladağ, formerly Karsantı, is a municipality and district of Adana Province, Turkey. Its area is 1,340 km^{2}, and its population is 15,897 (2022). It is about 100 km north of the city of Adana, up in the mountains. This is an undeveloped area, the people live from agriculture and forestry. People from the Çukurova retreat up here in the summer to escape the heat on the plain, although it's too high up for a day trip.

The Aladağlar mountains are an eastern extension of the Taurus Mountains. These high mountains are a popular area for climbing, usually accessed from the north through the town of Niğde. The town of Aladağ sits on their southern side, accessed by road up from Adana. Approximately 9 kilometers from the settlement of Karsantı / Aladağ is Meydan Kalesi, an impressive castle and chapel constructed during the period of the Armenian Kingdom of Cilicia. This fortress has three baileys, an array of rounded towers, and a ceremonial hall whose decorations included carved capitals. The fortification was surveyed in 1974 and 1979.

== Composition ==
There are 31 neighbourhoods in Aladağ District:

- Akören
- Akpınar
- Başpınar
- Boztahta
- Büyüksofulu
- Ceritler
- Darılık
- Dayılar
- Dölekli
- Ebrişim
- Eğner
- Gerdibi
- Gireğiyeniköy
- Gökçe
- Kabasakal
- Karahan
- Kıcak
- Kışlak
- Kızıldam
- Kökez
- Köprücük
- Küp
- Madenli
- Mansurlu
- Mazılık
- Posyağbasan
- Sinanpaşa
- Topallı
- Uzunkuyu
- Yetimli
- Yüksekören
