= Gökçe, Aladağ =

Gökçeköy
- Neighbourhood
- Location in Turkey
- Coordinates: 37.5317°N 35.5200°E
- Country: Turkey
- Province: Adana
- District: Aladağ
- Population (2022): 251
- Time zone: UTC+3 (TRT)

Gökçeköy (also: Gökçe) is a neighbourhood in the municipality and district of Aladağ, Adana Province, Turkey. Its population is 251 (2022).
