= Kökez, Aladağ =

Kökez
- Neighbourhood
- Location in Turkey
- Coordinates: 37.5813°N 35.2875°E
- Country: Turkey
- Province: Adana
- District: Aladağ
- Population (2022): 1,045
- Time zone: UTC+3 (TRT)

Kökez is a neighbourhood in the municipality and district of Aladağ, Adana Province, Turkey. Its population is 1,045 (2022).
