= Kızıldam, Aladağ =

Kızıldam
- Neighbourhood
- Location in Turkey
- Coordinates: 37.5289°N 35.4811°E
- Country: Turkey
- Province: Adana
- District: Aladağ
- Population (2022): 508
- Time zone: UTC+3 (TRT)

Kızıldam is a neighbourhood in the municipality and district of Aladağ, Adana Province, Turkey. Its population is 508 (2022).
