= Yüksekören, Aladağ =

Yüksekören
- Neighbourhood
- Location in Turkey
- Coordinates: 37.3948°N 35.3998°E
- Country: Turkey
- Province: Adana
- District: Aladağ
- Population (2022): 74
- Time zone: UTC+3 (TRT)

Yüksekören is a neighbourhood in the municipality and district of Aladağ, Adana Province, Turkey. Its population is 74 (2022).
