= Eğner =

- Neighbourhood
- Location in Turkey
- Coordinates: 37°25′N 35°27′E
- Country: Turkey
- Province: Adana
- District: Aladağ
- Population (2022): 114
- Time zone: UTC+3 (TRT)

Eğner is a neighbourhood in the municipality and district of Aladağ, Adana Province, Turkey. Its population was 114 in 2022.
