= Atatürk Museums in Turkey =

This is a list of Atatürk Museums in Turkey. Most of these are historic buildings converted into museums, in which the founder of modern Turkey, Mustafa Kemal Atatürk (1881–1938), stayed during his visit to the location. Some are replicas of the houses, in which Atatürk stayed during his visits.

Name	City	Province	Status
Atatürk Museum (Adana)	Adana	Adana Province	Atatürk stayed
Atatürk's House (Şuhut)	Şuhut	Afyonkarahisar Province	Headquarter of Atatürk in 1922 Great Offensive
Atatürk's Residence and Railway Museum	Ankara	Ankara Province	Residence and headquarters during the Turkish War of Independence
Atatürk Museum Mansion	Ankara	Ankara Province	Permanent mansion of the presidency
Atatürk's House Museum (Antalya)	Antalya	Antalya Province	Replica of the house Atatürk visited in Antalya
Bursa Atatürk Museum	Bursa	Bursa Province	Atatürk stayed
Denizli Museum	Denizli	Denizli Province	Atatürk stayed
Atatürk's House Museum	Şebinkarahisar	Giresun Province	Atatürk stayed
Dolmabahçe Palace	Istanbul	Istanbul Province	Atatürk stayed (and died)
Florya Atatürk Marine Mansion	Istanbul	Istanbul Province	Built for the presidency
Atatürk Museum, Şişli	Istanbul	Istanbul Province	Atatürk's family stayed before the Turkish war on Independence
İzmir Atatürk Museum	İzmir	İzmir Province	Atatürk stayed
Mersin Atatürk Museum	Mersin	Mersin Province	Atatürk stayed
Silifke Atatürk Museum	Silifke	Mersin Province	Atatürk stayed
Taşucu Atatürk Museum	Taşucu	Mersin Province	Replica of the House in Thessaloniki, Greece during his childhood
Rize Atatürk Museum	Rize	Rize Province	Atatürk stayed
Sakarya Museum	Adapazarı	Sakarya Province	Atatürk met his mother during the Turkish War of Independence
Yalova Atatürk Mansion	Yalova	Yalova Province	Built for the presidency

There are also two Atatürk houses abroad. One is the Atatürk Museum (Thessaloniki) in which Atatürk spent his childhood in Thessaloniki, Greece. The other one is Sarmadzhiev House in Sofia in which Atatürk lived during his diplomatic mission to Bulgaria. But the later is not a museum and it is now used as a part of Turkish embassy in Sofia.
