= Koçyatağı =

Koçyatağı can refer to:

- Koçyatağı, Erzincan
- Koçyatağı, Şuhut
