= Başören =

Başören may refer to:

- Başören, Bismil
- Başören, Ceyhan, Adana Province, Turkey
- Başören, Şuhut, Afyonkarahisar Province, Turkey
- Başören, Beypazarı, Ankara Province, Turkey
- Başören, Kızılcahamam, Ankara Province, Turkey
- Başören, Kastamonu, Kastamonu Province, Turkey
- Başören, Pasinler
