= Ilter Uzel Museum of Medicine and Dentistry =

Coordinates: 36.9837°N 35.3320°E

- İlter Uzel Tıp ve Diş Hekimliği Müzesi
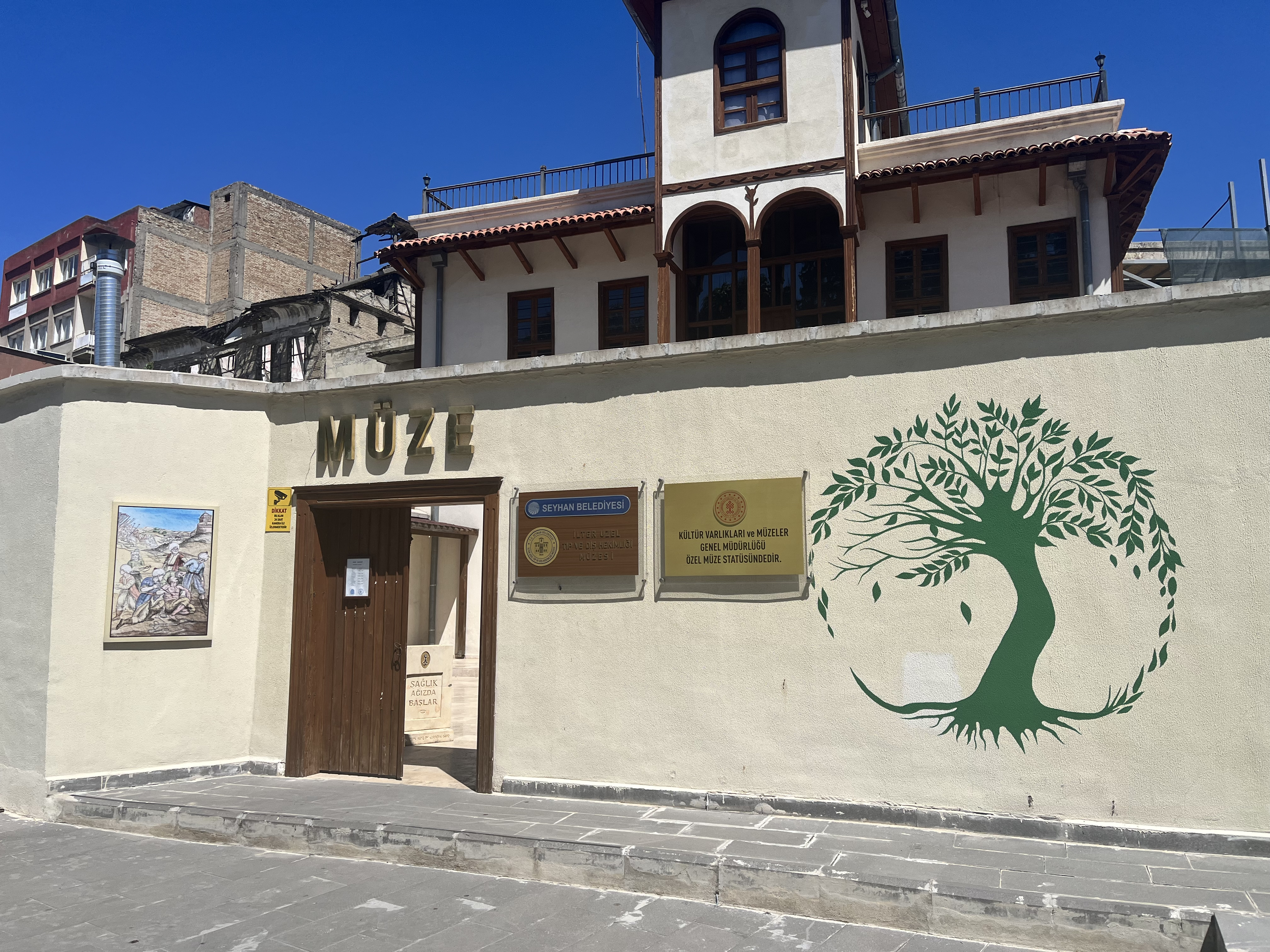
- Established: September 11, 2020
- Location: Seyhan, Adana, Turkey
- Type: Specialized museum
- Manager: Seyhan Municipality

Ilter Uzel Museum of Medicine and Dentistry (Turkish: İlter Uzel Tıp ve Diş Hekimliği Müzesi) is a museum located in the Tepebağ neighborhood of Adana, which opened to visitors in 2020.

It is Turkey's first dentistry museum. Objects such as professional tools used by former medical doctors and dentists, as well as medical history books, are exhibited.

== Name origin ==
The museum is named after Ilter Uzel, one of the first dentists in Turkey to earn a doctorate in the field of medical history and deontology, and its collection consists of objects that Uzel began collecting from 1972 onwards.

== History ==
In the 1970s, Uzel, who earned a doctorate in medical history and focused on the subject of the first Turkish medical manuscripts in his thesis, began building his collection in 1972 when he started writing his thesis. Over the next 50 years, he gathered objects related to the history of dentistry through purchases and donations. Uzel also created miniatures of significant events and figures in the history of dentistry, thus assembling a collection of approximately 8,000 objects, including rare instruments and paintings.

The museum housing Uzel's collection was inaugurated on November 9, 2020, during a ceremony held at a two-story, ten-room historic mansion located in the Tepebağ neighborhood. The building was expropriated by the Seyhan Municipality in 2018 and, after being restored, was allocated for the museum.

The establishment, organization, sections, and information about the objects and paintings displayed in the museum were compiled into a book in 2021, published in both Turkish and English. The 100-page book was authored by İlter Uzel.

The museum, granted "private museum" status by the Ministry of Culture and Tourism, was awarded in 2021 in the "Collection and Archive Museums" category at the Museum Encouragement Competition organized by the Historic Cities Union. It was deemed worthy of the award due to its collection of rare artifacts and its location within a historical building that has been repurposed with a new function.

== Sections ==
- Adana Medical History – Prehistoric Era
- Adana Medical History – Ancient Era
- Dental and Medical Instruments
- Library
- Medicine in the Republican Era
- Lokman Hekim and Medicinal Plants

== Exhibitations ==
The museum houses approximately three thousand books on dentistry in Turkish and other languages. One of the notable works in the collection is the first printed dentistry book published in Turkish. In addition to dentistry, the museum also contains works related to medicine and pharmacy. A facsimile edition of the famous medical book Materia Medica, written by the ancient physician Dioscorides of Anazarbus, is among the significant pieces displayed in the museum.

A copy of the upper jawbone mold belonging to Mustafa Kemal Atatürk, Enver Pasha's gold molar, a dental chair used in the 1840s that belonged to an Armenian dentist, and the orthodontically treated and filled lower jaw of an ANZAC soldier who participated in the Gallipoli Campaign are among the objects exhibited in the museum.

Silicone statues of some figures from medical history have been placed in the museum. Among them are Lokman Hekim, Ibn Sina, and the twin doctor brothers Kosmas and Damianos, who, in the 3rd century AD, successfully performed an organ transplant from a recently deceased person to a patient with gangrene in his leg. Additionally, there is a silicone statue depicting İlter Uzel treating a Turkmen girl in the dentist's chair.

== Awards ==
- 2021 Historic Cities Union Museum Encouragement Competition Collection and Archive Museums Award

== Gallery ==
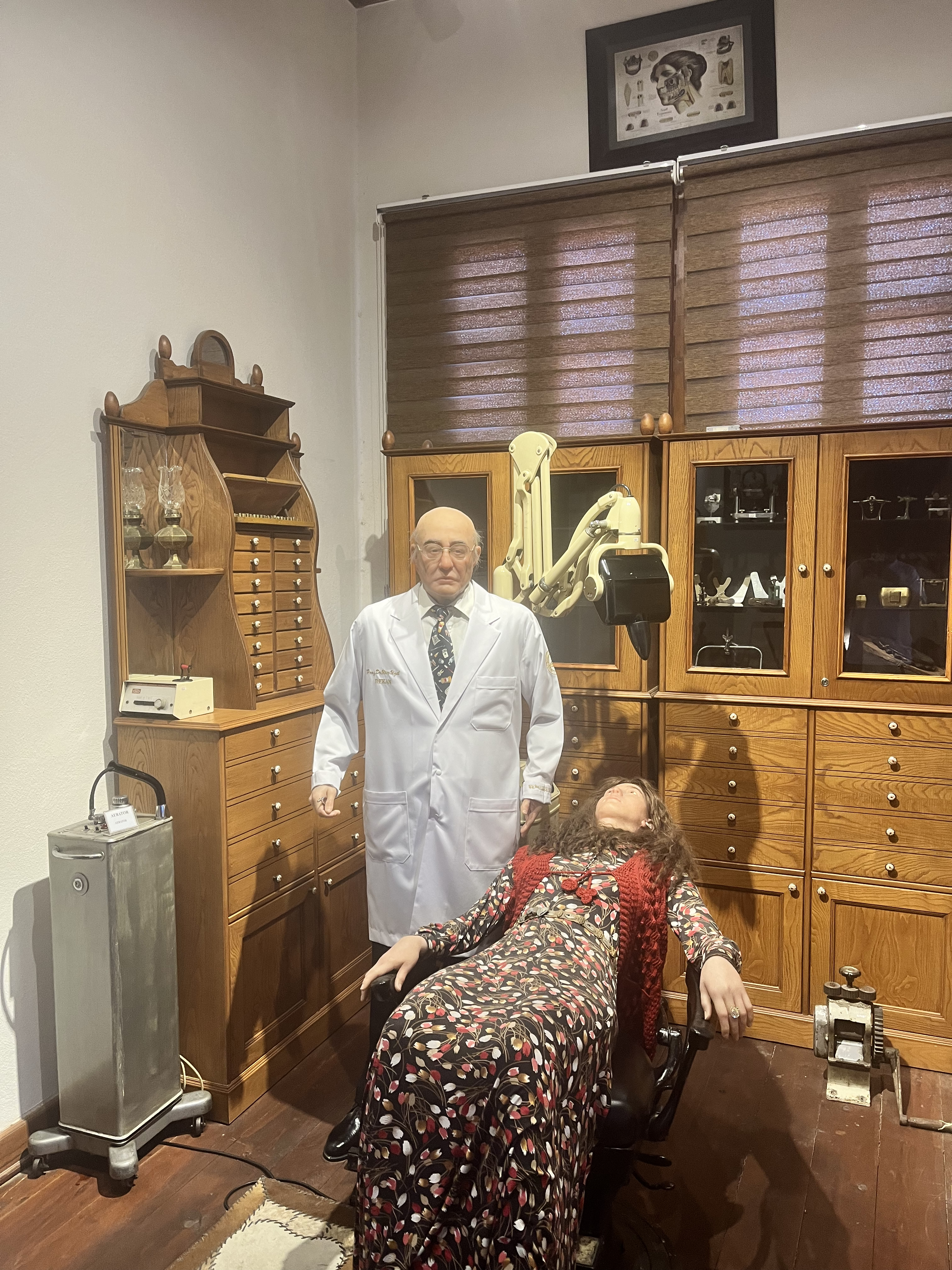
Ilter Uzel treating a Turkmen girl in the dentist's chair

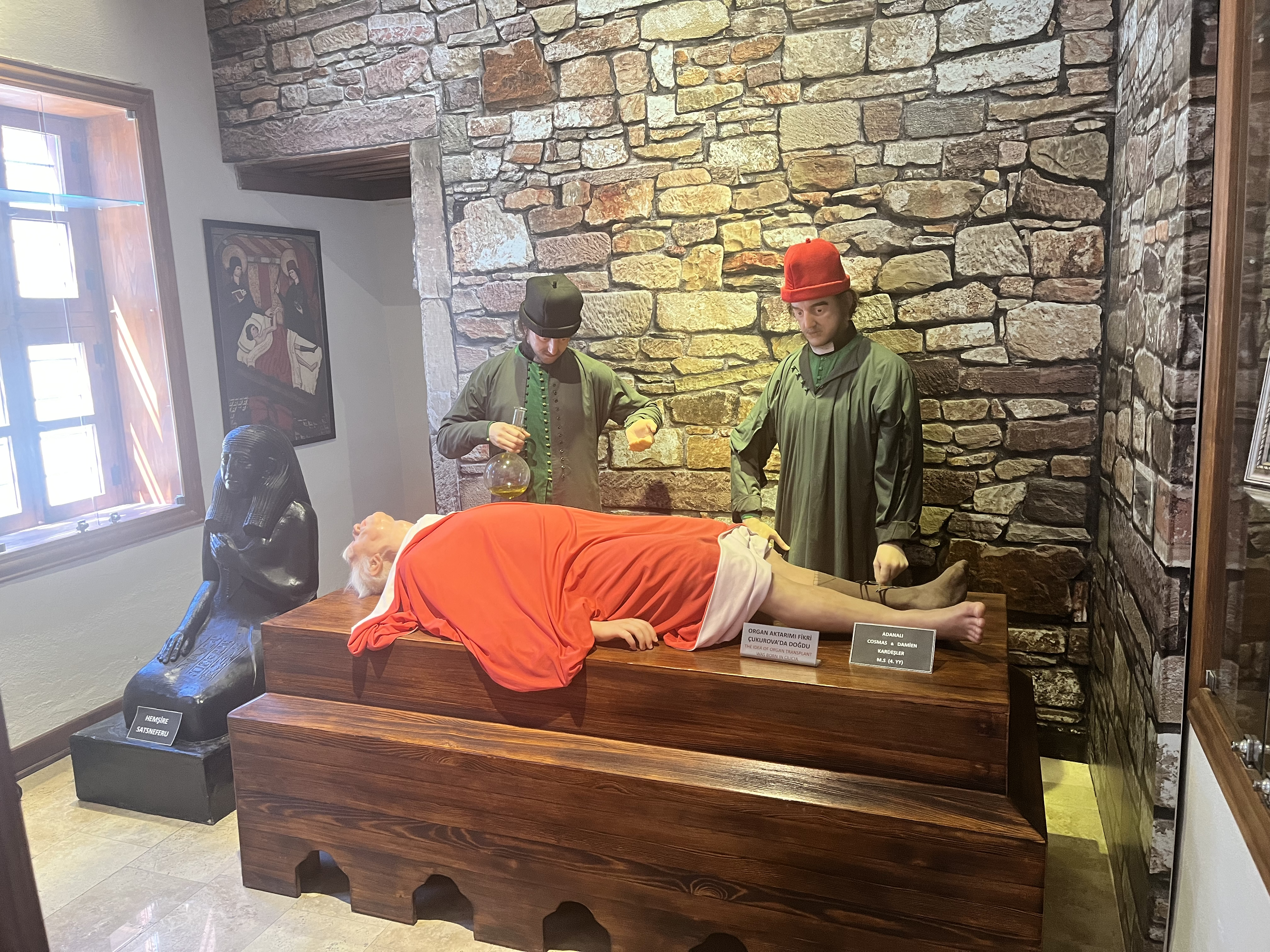
Silicone statue of Kosmas and Damianos

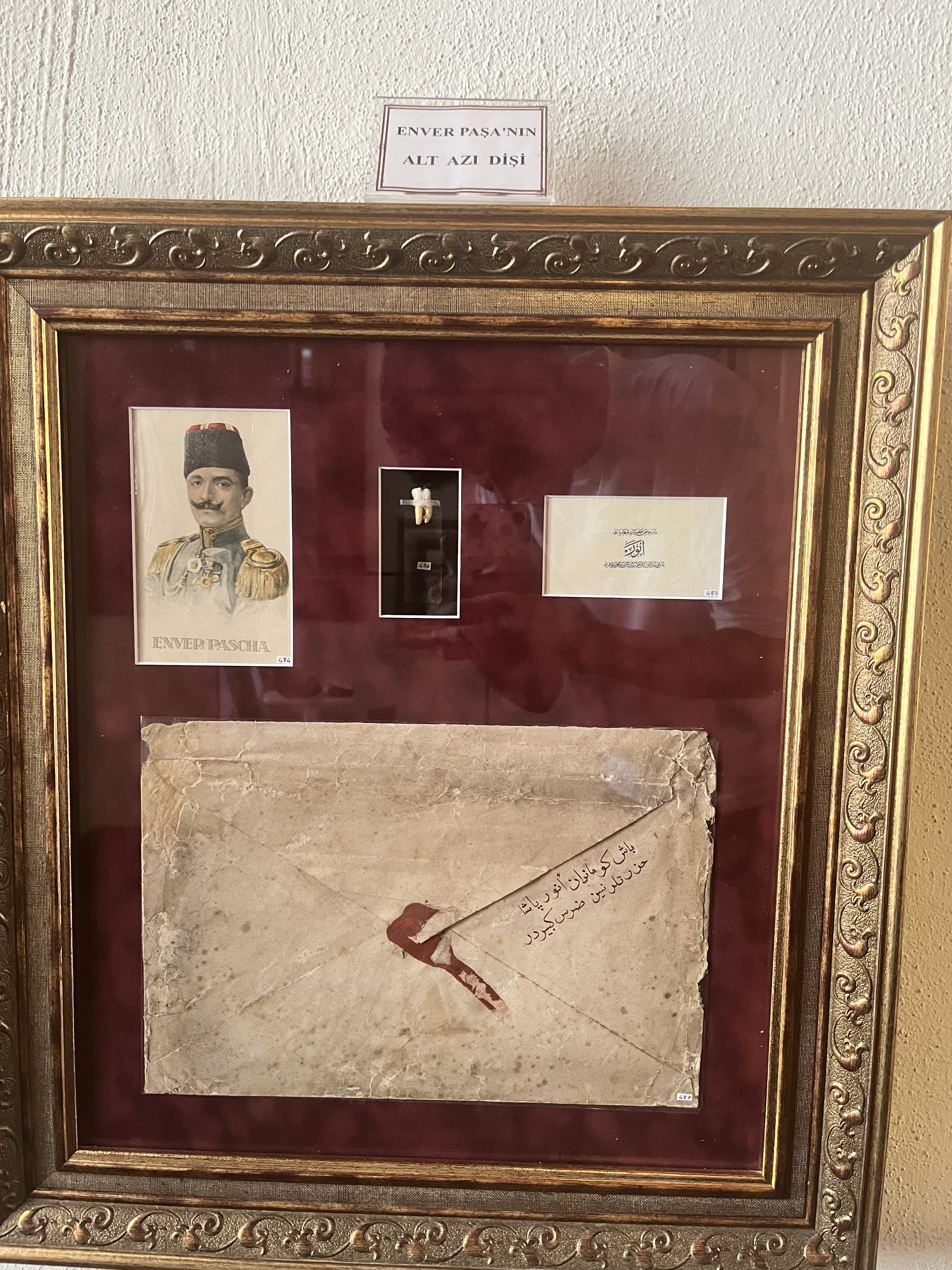
Enver Pasha's molar tooth

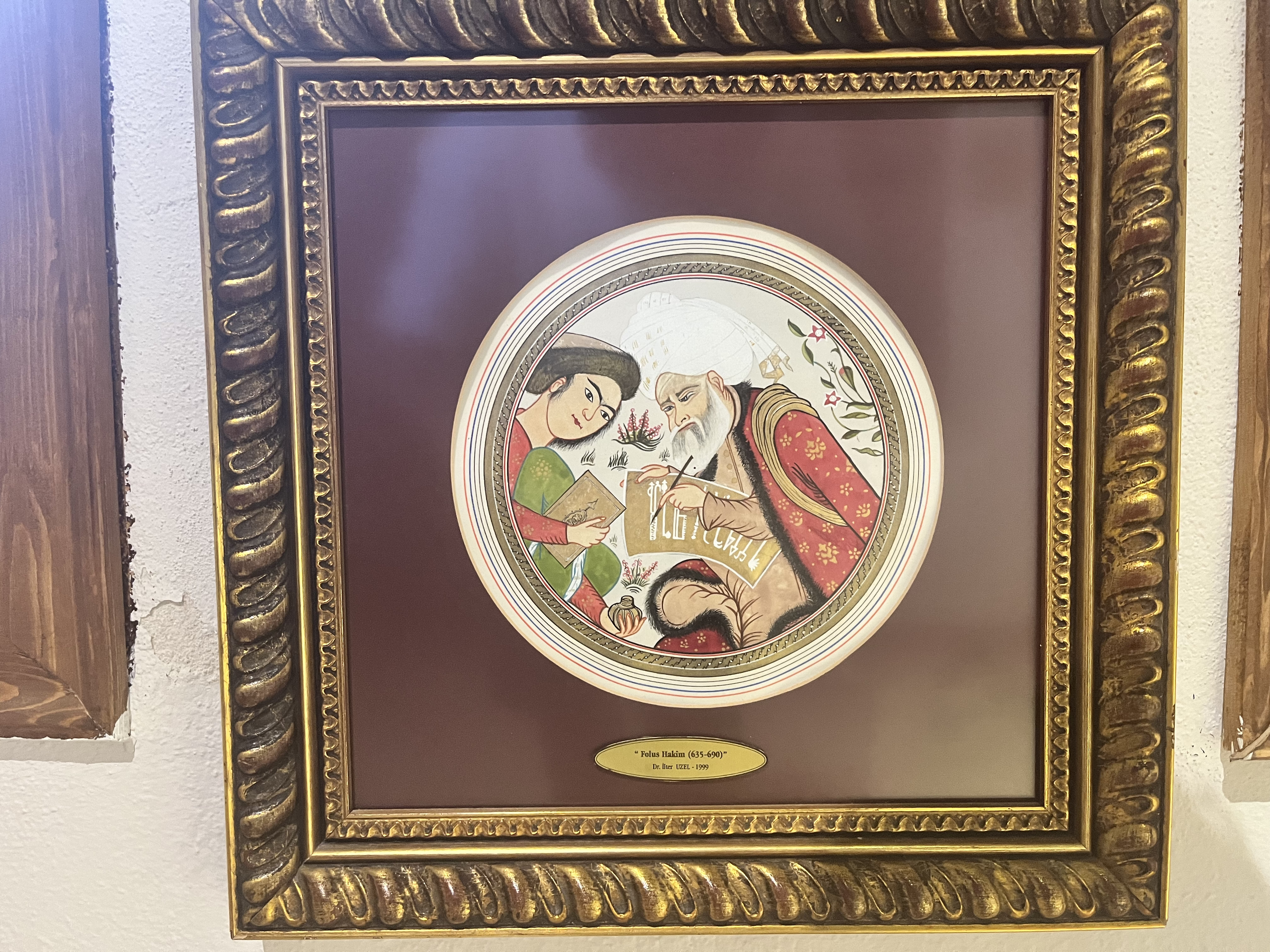
Miniatures by Ilter Uzel
