= İcikli =

İcikli may refer to:

- İcikli, Baklan
- İcikli, Şuhut
