= Çakırözü, Şuhut =

Çakırözü
- Village
- Location within Turkey Location within Turkey Aegean
- Coordinates: 38°34′N 30°31′E
- Country: Turkey
- Province: Afyonkarahisar
- District: Şuhut
- Population (2021): 1,135
- Time zone: UTC+3 (TRT)

Çakırözü is a village in the Şuhut District, Afyonkarahisar Province, Turkey. Its population is 1,135 (2021).

== Victory Trail ==
Çakırözü is the starting point of a public marching, which is held to commemorate the begin of the Great Offensive on August 26, 1922. Every year beginning on August 25, events, called "Victory Week" (Turkish: Zafer Haftası), are held in the region, where the Battle of Dumlupınar took place, marking the last fight of the Turkish War of Independence. Following celebrations organized by the Turkish Army in the stadium of the district Şuhut, the crowd of some thousands arrives in Çakırözü and departs by foot at 23:00 local time heading Kocatepe, a three-hour marching, called the Victory March (Zafer Yürüyüşü), with torches in the night. The top leaders of the Turkish military, Commander-in-Chief Mustafa Kemal Pasha, Chief of the General Staff Fevzi Pasha and Commander of the Western Army İsmet Pasha, progressed on this trail, what is now named the "Victory Trail" (Zafer Yolu), in the eve of the Great Offensive in 1922 to arrive in Kocatepe, where they set up their quarters in the early morning for the final battle.
