= Güneytepe =

Güneytepe can refer to:

- Güneytepe, Keban
- Güneytepe, Şuhut
