= Taşucu Atatürk Museum =

Turkey museum

- Taşucu Atatürk Evi
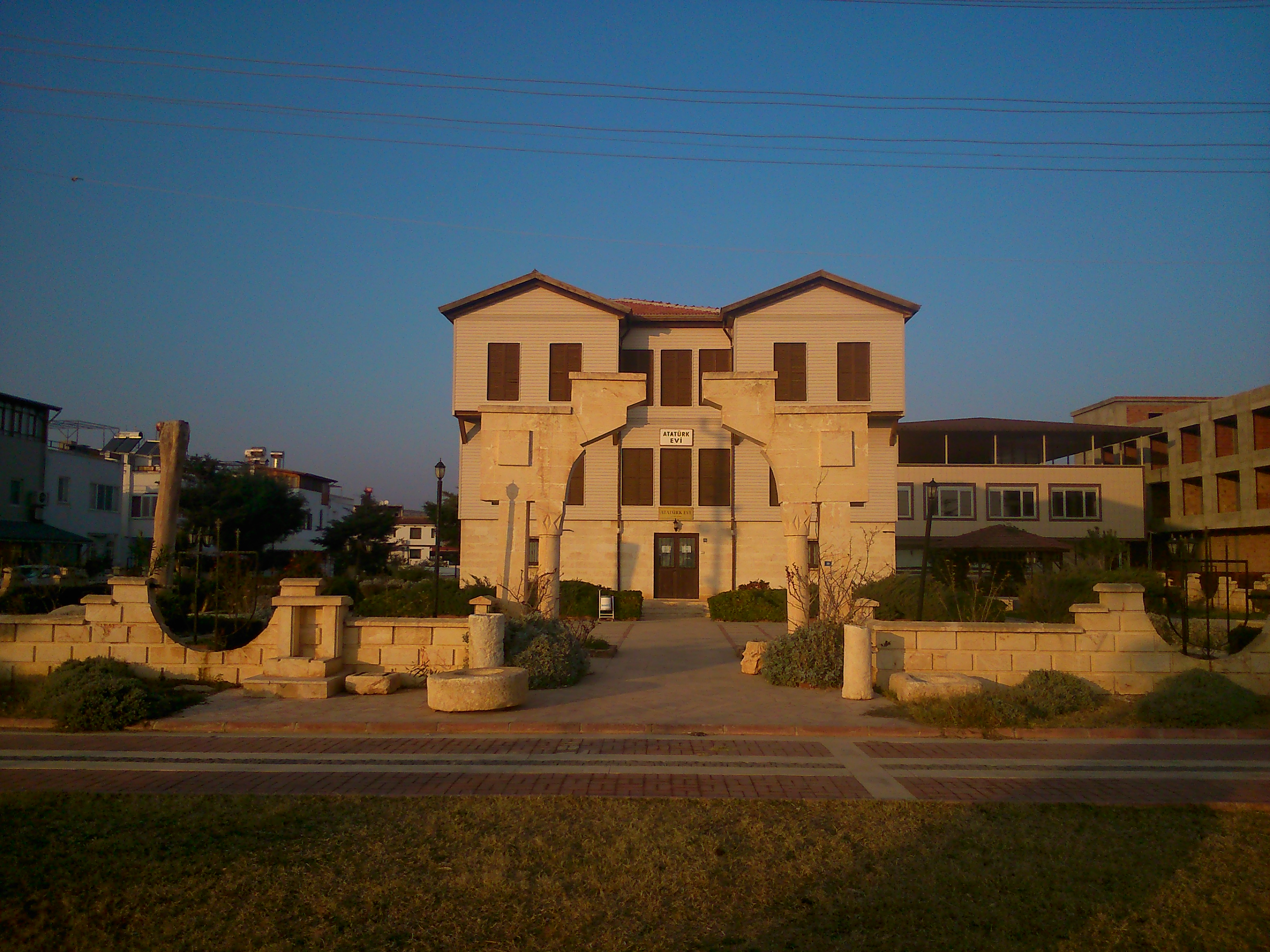
- Taşucu Atatürk Museum

- Taşucu Atatürk Museum
- Established: 2005; 21 years ago
- Location: Reşadiye mah. Silifke, Mersin Province, Turkey
- Coordinates: 36°19′04″N 33°53′04″E
- Type: Memorial house

Taşucu Atatürk Museum is a house museum in Turkey.

The museum is in Taşucu town of Silifke ilçe (district), Mersin Province at 36°19′04″N 33°53′04″E. Atatürk (1881–1938), the founder of modern Turkey was fond of Taşucu and visited the town four times: 28 January 1925, 12 May 1926, 11 February 1931, and 20 February 1935. During these visits, he likened Taşucu to Thessaloniki, Greece in which he spent his childhood. In 2000s Taşucu municipality decided to build a replica of his house in Thessaloniki as a memorial house. Thus, this house, unlike most other Atatürk memorial houses in Turkey, is not a house in which Atatürk actually stayed.

The ground area of the three storey wooden house is 100 square metres (1,100 sq ft). The area including the yard is 1,540 square metres (16,600 sq ft).

On the ground floor, Atatürk's life in chronological order is exhibited by panels. In the upper floor, there are three rooms; a kitchen, a library, and a guest room with prayer facility. On the uppermost floor there are two rooms; a room of Zübeyde Hanım (Atatürk's mother) and the workroom of Atatürk. The bathroom and the balcony are also on this floor.

== See also ==
- Atatürk Museums in Turkey
