= Mahmutköy =

Mahmutköy can refer to:

- Mahmutköy, Keşan
- Mahmutköy, Şuhut
