= Çobankaya =

Çobankaya may refer to:

- Çobankaya, Bolu
- Çobankaya, Kargı
- Çobankaya, Şuhut
