= Balçıkhisar =

Balçıkhisar can refer to the following villages in Turkey:

- Balçıkhisar, Alaca
- Balçıkhisar, Araç
- Balçıkhisar, Osmaneli
- Balçıkhisar, Şuhut
