= Aydın (disambiguation) =

Aydın is a city in Aydın Province, Turkey.

Aydın may also refer to:

== People ==
- Aydın (name)

== Places ==
=== Turkey ===
- Aydın (electoral district), a constituency of the Grand National Assembly of Turkey
- Aydın Province, a province and metropolitan municipality of Turkey
- Aydın Subregion, a statistical area in Turkey
- Aidin vilayet, an administrative division of the Ottoman Empire
- Beylik of Aydin, an Anatolian principality famous for seaborne raiding
- Aydın, Kahramankazan, a neighbourhood in Ankara Province, Turkey
- Aydın, Kozan, a neighbourhood in Adana Province, Turkey
- Aydın, Osmancık or Aydınköy, a village inÇorum Province, Turkey
- Aydın, Şuhut, a village in Afyonkarahisar Province, Turkey

=== Turkmenistan ===
- Aýdyň, a village in Balkan Province, Turkmenistan

== Other uses ==
- Battle of Aydın, a 1919 action of the Greco-Turkish War
- SS Aydin (1873), former name of the MV Rahmi Kaptan, a ship built in 1873 as Honfleur
