= Anayurt, Şuhut =

Anayurt
- Village
- Location within Turkey Location within Turkey Aegean
- Coordinates: 38.4596°N 30.5845°E
- Country: Turkey
- Province: Afyonkarahisar
- District: Şuhut
- Population (2021): 446
- Time zone: UTC+3 (TRT)

Anayurt is a village in the Şuhut District, Afyonkarahisar Province, Turkey. Its population is 446 (2021).
