= İlyaslı, Şuhut =

İlyaslı
- Village
- Location within Turkey Location within Turkey Aegean
- Coordinates: 38.4465°N 30.4905°E
- Country: Turkey
- Province: Afyonkarahisar
- District: Şuhut
- Population (2021): 151
- Time zone: UTC+3 (TRT)

İlyaslı is a village in the Şuhut District, Afyonkarahisar Province, Turkey. Its population is 151 (2021).
