= Şuhut District =

- District
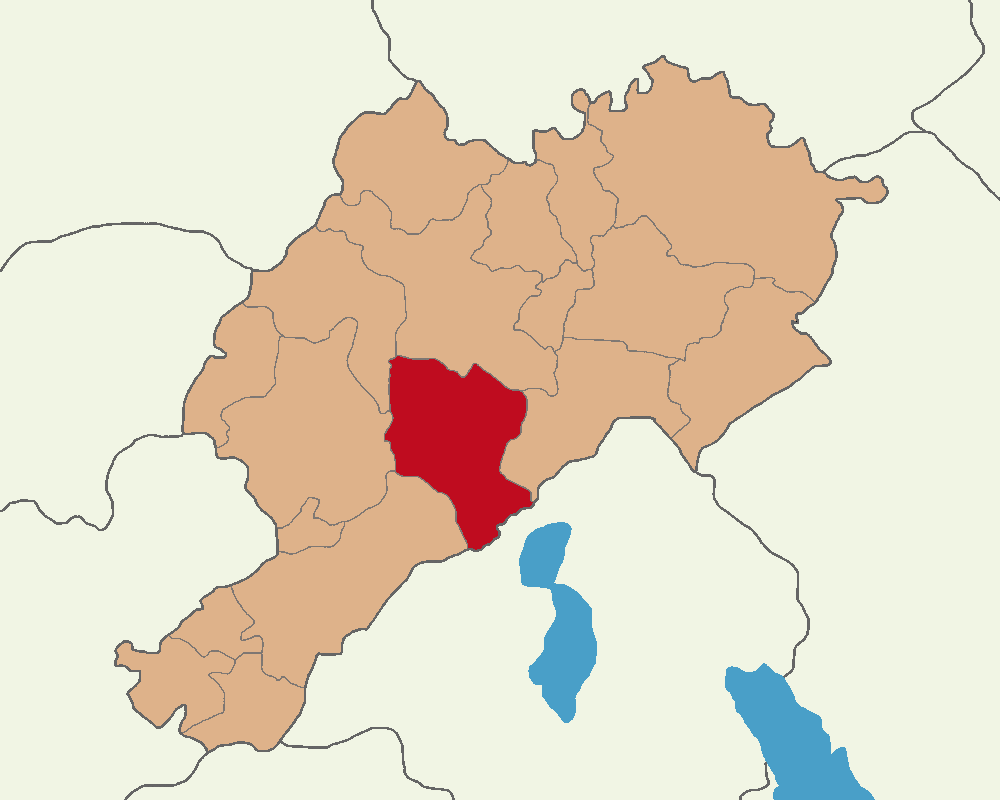
- Map showing Şuhut District in Afyonkarahisar Province

- Location in Turkey Şuhut District (Turkey Aegean)
- Coordinates: 38°32′N 30°33′E
- Country: Turkey
- Province: Afyonkarahisar
- Seat: Şuhut
- Area: 1,044 km^{2} (403 sq mi)
- Population (2021): 36,309
  - Density: 34.78/km^{2} (90.08/sq mi)
- Time zone: UTC+3 (TRT)

Şuhut District is a district of Afyonkarahisar Province of Turkey. Its seat is the town Şuhut. Its area is 1,044 km^{2}, and its population is 36,309 (2021).

== Composition ==
There are two municipalities in Şuhut District:

- Karaadilli
- Şuhut

There are 36 villages in Şuhut District:

- Ağzıkara
- Akyuva
- Anayurt
- Arızlı
- Atlıhisar
- Aydın
- Bademli
- Balçıkhisar
- Başören
- Bozan
- Çakırözü
- Çobankaya
- Dadak
- Demirbel
- Efe
- Güneytepe
- Hallaç
- İcikli
- İlyaslı
- İsalı
- Karacaören
- Karahallı
- Karlık
- Kavaklı
- Kayabelen
- Kılınçkaya
- Koçyatağı
- Kulak
- Mahmutköy
- Ortapınar
- Oynağan
- Paşacık
- Senir
- Tekke
- Uzunpınar
- Yarışlı
