= Atatürk's House Museum (Antalya) =

Museum in Turkey

- Atatürk Evi ve Müzesi
- Established: 1986
- Location: Antalya, Turkey
- Coordinates: 36.88051°N 30.70773°E
- Type: National, Biographical
- Visitors: 71,800 (2010)

Atatürk's House Museum (Turkish: Atatürk Evi ve Müzesi) is a national museum in Antalya, Turkey dedicated to the visits of Mustafa Kemal Atatürk to this city.

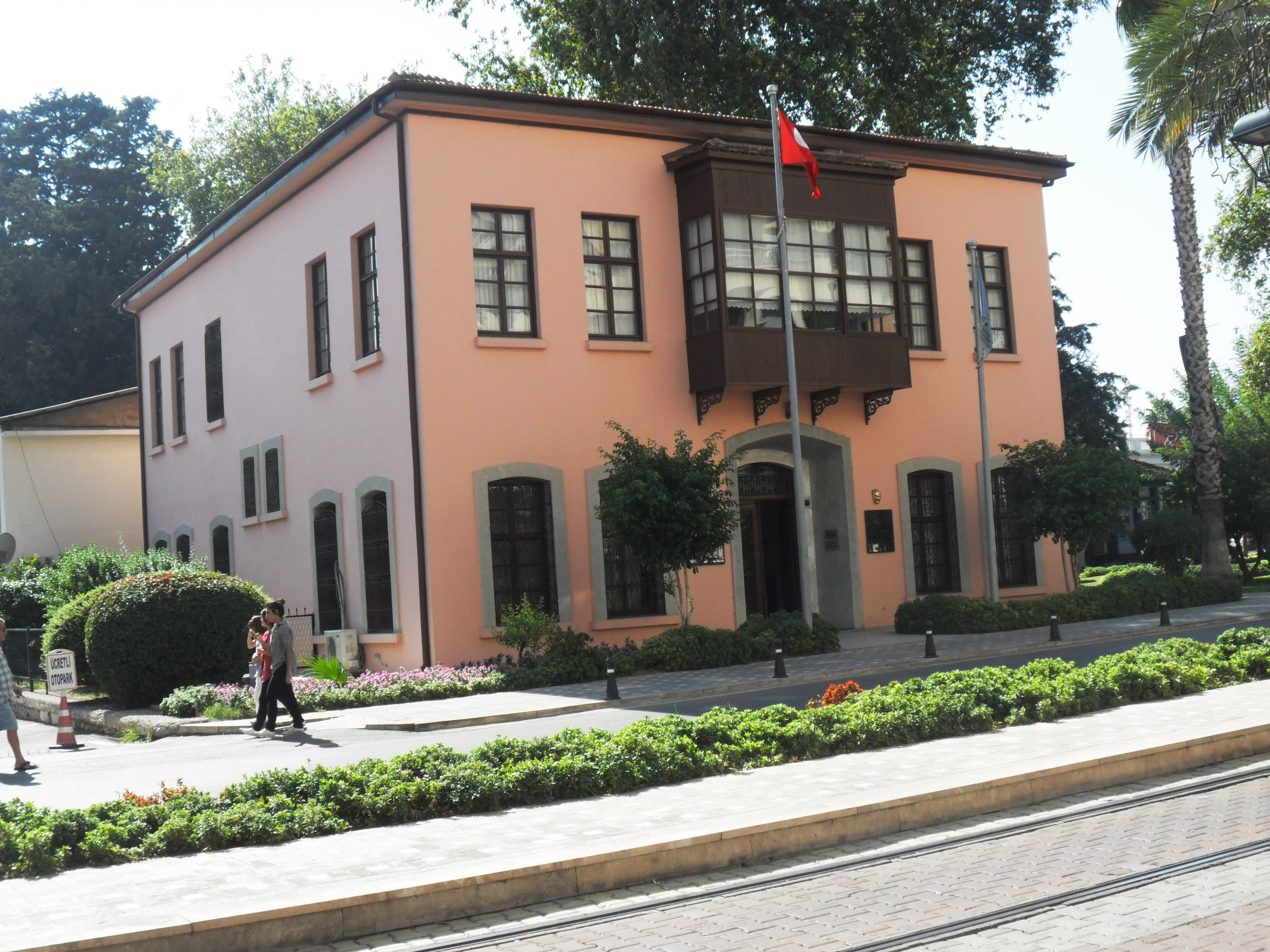
Antalya Atatürk Museum

== Museum building ==
The museum is located in a two-storey replica house, which was rebuilt original. Mustafa Kemal Atatürk stayed during his official visits to Antalya in 1930 and 1935 in the mansion that belonged to the governorship of the province. In 1984, the building was handed over to the Ministry of Culture and Tourism to be transformed into a house museum. The building had to be broken down in the frame of city's street widening project. With the financial support of a local electricity distribution company, the house was rebuilt at the same location. In 1986, the museum opened to the public.

== Exhibitions ==
At the first floor, newspapers, photos and documents relating to Atatürk's visits to Antalya between March 6–10, 1930 and February 18–19, 1935 are on display. At the second floor, there are two working rooms and a bedroom. At another section on that floor, a collection of banknotes, coins, commemorative coins and postage stamps issued since the proclamation of the Republic is on the show.

The most important part of the museum is the room with personal belongings of Atatürk, which were brought from Anıtkabir, the mausoleum in Ankara.

== Location and admission ==
Address

Işıklar Caddesi, Muratpaşa, Antalya

Admission

- 09:00–19:30 April to October
- 08:30–17:30 November to March
- Mondays closed.

Admission is free of charge.

== See also ==
- Atatürk Museums in Turkey
