= Karacaören, Şuhut =

Karacaören
- Village
- Location within Turkey Location within Turkey Aegean
- Coordinates: 38.2619°N 30.6439°E
- Country: Turkey
- Province: Afyonkarahisar
- District: Şuhut
- Population (2021): 595
- Time zone: UTC+3 (TRT)

Karacaören is a village in the Şuhut District, Afyonkarahisar Province, Turkey. Its population is 595 (2021). Before the 2013 reorganisation, it was a town (belde).
