= Yarışlı, Şuhut =

Yarışlı
- Village
- Location within Turkey Location within Turkey Aegean
- Coordinates: 38.5475°N 30.6461°E
- Country: Turkey
- Province: Afyonkarahisar
- District: Şuhut
- Population (2021): 1,609
- Time zone: UTC+3 (TRT)

Yarışlı is a village in the Şuhut District, Afyonkarahisar Province, Turkey. Its population is 1,609 (2021).
