= Atlıhisar, Şuhut =

Atlıhisar
- Village
- Location within Turkey Location within Turkey Aegean
- Coordinates: 38°27′N 30°35′E
- Country: Turkey
- Province: Afyonkarahisar
- District: Şuhut
- Population (2021): 1,370
- Time zone: UTC+3 (TRT)

Atlıhisar is a village in the Şuhut District, Afyonkarahisar Province, Turkey. Its population is 1,370 (2021). Before the 2013 reorganisation, it was a town (belde).
