= Kavaklı, Şuhut =

Kavaklı
- Village
- Location within Turkey Location within Turkey Aegean
- Coordinates: 38.4967°N 30.4675°E
- Country: Turkey
- Province: Afyonkarahisar
- District: Şuhut
- Population (2021): 357
- Time zone: UTC+3 (TRT)

Kavaklı is a village in the Şuhut District, Afyonkarahisar Province, Turkey. Its population is 357 (2021).
