= Karlık, Şuhut =

Karlık
- Village
- Location within Turkey Location within Turkey Aegean
- Coordinates: 38.578777°N 30.532697°E
- Country: Turkey
- Province: Afyonkarahisar
- District: Şuhut
- Population (2021): 160
- Time zone: UTC+3 (TRT)

Karlık is a village in the Şuhut District, Afyonkarahisar Province, Turkey. Its population is 160 (2021).
