= Rize Atatürk Museum =

Museum in Rize, Turkey

- Rize Atatürk Müzesi
- Rize Atatürk Museum
- Established: 1985; 41 years ago
- Location: Müftü mah Kirazlık sokak Rize, Turkey
- Coordinates: 41°01′24″N 40°32′03″E
- Type: Memorial House, Ethnography
- Owner: Ministry of Culture and Tourism

Rize Atatürk Museum (Turkish: Atatürk Evi Müzesi, also known as Mehmet Mataracı Konağı) is a museum in Rize, Turkey. The museum is in the Müftü quarter of Rize, and is locally known as Mehmet Mataracı mansion. It is to the east of the city stadium and to the south of the main road.

The museum building is a three-storey mansion that was built in 1921. In 1924, Mustafa Kemal Pasha (later Atatürk), the founder of the Republic of Turkey, stayed in the house during his visit to Rize. In 1981, the 100th birth year of Atatürk, the owners of the house granted it to the governorship of Rize to be used as an Atatürk museum. The museum was opened on 27 December 1985.

On the ground floor, inscriptions and tombstones are exhibited. On the first floor, there are traditional weaving instruments as well as other ethnographic items. On the second floor, memorial items of Atatürk, such as his personal belongings and photos about the Turkish War of Independence, are exhibited.

== See also ==
- Atatürk Museums in Turkey
