= Kulak, Şuhut =

Kulak
- Village
- Location within Turkey Location within Turkey Aegean
- Coordinates: 38.3831°N 30.5886°E
- Country: Turkey
- Province: Afyonkarahisar
- District: Şuhut
- Population (2021): 126
- Time zone: UTC+3 (TRT)

Kulak is a village in the Şuhut District, Afyonkarahisar Province, Turkey. Its population is 126 (2021).
