= Atatürk's House Museum (Şebinkarahisar) =

Museum in Turkey

- Atatürk Evi ve Müzesi
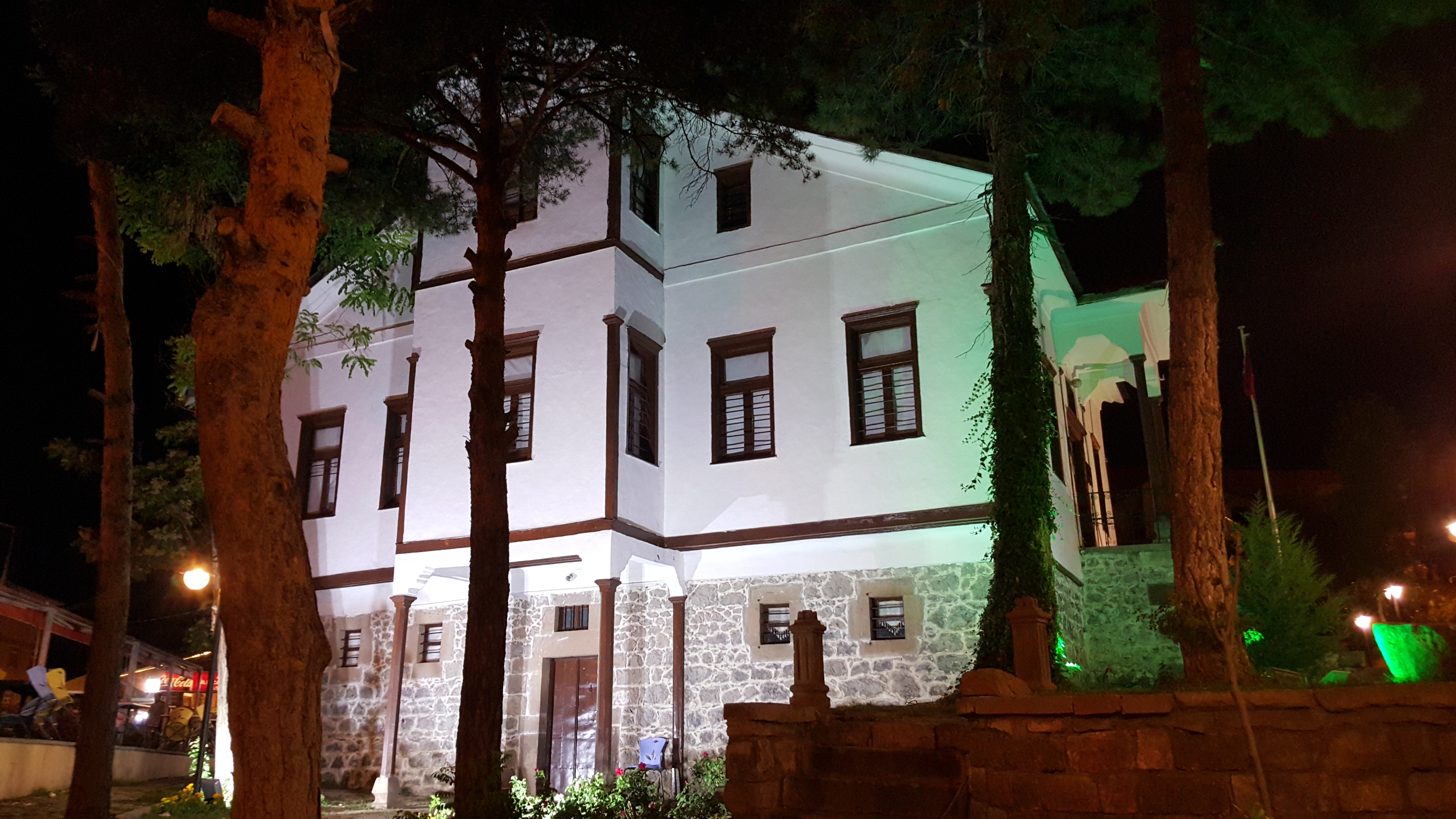
- Atatürk's House Museum
- Established: 11 October 1982; 43 years ago
- Location: Şebinkarahisar, Giresun Province, Turkey
- Coordinates: 40.28871°N 38.42293°E
- Type: National, Biographical

Atatürk's House Museum (Turkish: Atatürk Evi ve Müzesi) is a national museum in Şebinkarahisar district of Giresun Province, northern Turkey dedicated to the visit of Mustafa Kemal Atatürk to this town.

== Location and history ==
Atatürk's House Museum is located in the Bülbül neighborhood of Şebinkarahisar's center. The building is a plain two-storey wooden replica house, which was rebuilt original. President Mustafa Kemal Atatürk (in office 1923–1938), the founder of the Turkish Republic, stayed one night during his visit in the town on 11 October 1924. The building date of the original house, which was owned by Tüfekçizade Mustafa Ertem, is estimated to be end of 19th century or right at the beginning of the 20th century.

The building was expropriated by the Treasury. Various restoration and repair works in accordance with the house's original state were carried out and furnished in 1932 with a financial allowance by the General Directorate of Highways totaling to ₺3 million (ca. US$ 1.5 million at that time).

The building was opened on 11 October 1982 as a museum to visitors at the 58th anniversary of Atatürk's arrival in Şebinkarahisar. Owned by the Treasury, the building's allocation was transferred on 2 May 1986 from the Ministry of Culture and Tourism to the Municipality of Şebinkarahisar.

== The building ==
The building and its garden are located on a platform a little higher from the road level. The entrance to the ground floor is from the east, through a wide wooden door. From this floor, which is not actively used, a wooden helical staircase leads to the second floor. However, the main access to the second floor is through a separate entrance from the north. There is a monumental entrance with a protruding triangular pediment, supported by wooden columns, and ten stone-stepped stairs and a two-winged wooden door. This is the floor used as the actual museum, and right above it is the half-floor attic, which is not visible from the front. This attic is accessed from the second floor via a wooden helical staircase.

== The museum ==
In the Atatürk's House Museum, some items used by Atatürk during his stay and some local ethnographic artifacts are exhibited.

In the museum, the beds in the room, where Atatürk and his aide stayed, the desk, armchairs and chairs, sofas, the piano in its original state and some other historical items as well as various local ethnographic artifacts are exhibited. It also includes an Atatürk Library of 500 books and an Atatürk Corner with pictures. The museum, which has no technical or expert staff, is opened to visitors on important days and upon request by officials appointed by the municipality.

== See also ==
- Atatürk Museums in Turkey
