= Karaadilli, Şuhut =

Karaadilli
- Municipality
- Location in Turkey Karaadilli (Turkey Aegean)
- Coordinates: 38°18′N 30°38′E
- Country: Turkey
- Province: Afyonkarahisar
- District: Şuhut
- Population (2021): 2,224
- Time zone: UTC+3 (TRT)

Karaadilli is a town (belde) and municipality in the Şuhut District, Afyonkarahisar Province, Turkey. Its population is 2,224 (2021).
