= Bozan, Şuhut =

Bozan
- Village
- Location within Turkey Location within Turkey Aegean
- Coordinates: 38.4647°N 30.7369°E
- Country: Turkey
- Province: Afyonkarahisar
- District: Şuhut
- Population (2021): 130
- Time zone: UTC+3 (TRT)

Bozan is a village in the Şuhut District, Afyonkarahisar Province, Turkey. Its population is 130 (2021).
