= Uzunpınar, Şuhut =

Uzunpınar
- Village
- Location within Turkey Location within Turkey Aegean
- Coordinates: 38°22′50″N 30°40′38″E
- Country: Turkey
- Province: Afyonkarahisar
- District: Şuhut
- Population (2021): 148
- Time zone: UTC+3 (TRT)

Uzunpınar is a village in the Şuhut District, Afyonkarahisar Province, Turkey. Its population is 148 (2021).
