= İsalı, Şuhut =

İsalı
- Village
- Location within Turkey Location within Turkey Aegean
- Coordinates: 38.5267°N 30.7172°E
- Country: Turkey
- Province: Afyonkarahisar
- District: Şuhut
- Population (2021): 191
- Time zone: UTC+3 (TRT)

İsalı is a village in the Şuhut District, Afyonkarahisar Province, Turkey. Its population is 191 (2021).
