= Hallaç, Şuhut =

Hallaç
- Village
- Location within Turkey Location within Turkey Aegean
- Coordinates: 38.4956°N 30.5872°E
- Country: Turkey
- Province: Afyonkarahisar
- District: Şuhut
- Population (2021): 630
- Time zone: UTC+3 (TRT)

Hallaç is a village in the Şuhut District, Afyonkarahisar Province, Turkey. Its population was 630 (2021).
