= Karahallı, Şuhut =

Karahallı
- Village
- Location within Turkey Location within Turkey Aegean
- Coordinates: 38.4683°N 30.6862°E
- Country: Turkey
- Province: Afyonkarahisar
- District: Şuhut
- Population (2021): 35
- Time zone: UTC+3 (TRT)

Karahallı is a village in the Şuhut District, Afyonkarahisar Province, Turkey. Its population is 35 (2021).
