= Ortapınar, Şuhut =

Ortapınar
- Village
- Location within Turkey Location within Turkey Aegean
- Coordinates: 38°32′N 30°30′E
- Country: Turkey
- Province: Afyonkarahisar
- District: Şuhut
- Population (2021): 772
- Time zone: UTC+3 (TRT)

Ortapınar is a village in the Şuhut District, Afyonkarahisar Province, Turkey. Its population is 772 (2021).
