= İzmir Atatürk Museum =

Museum in İzmir, Turkey

- İzmir Atatürk Müzesi
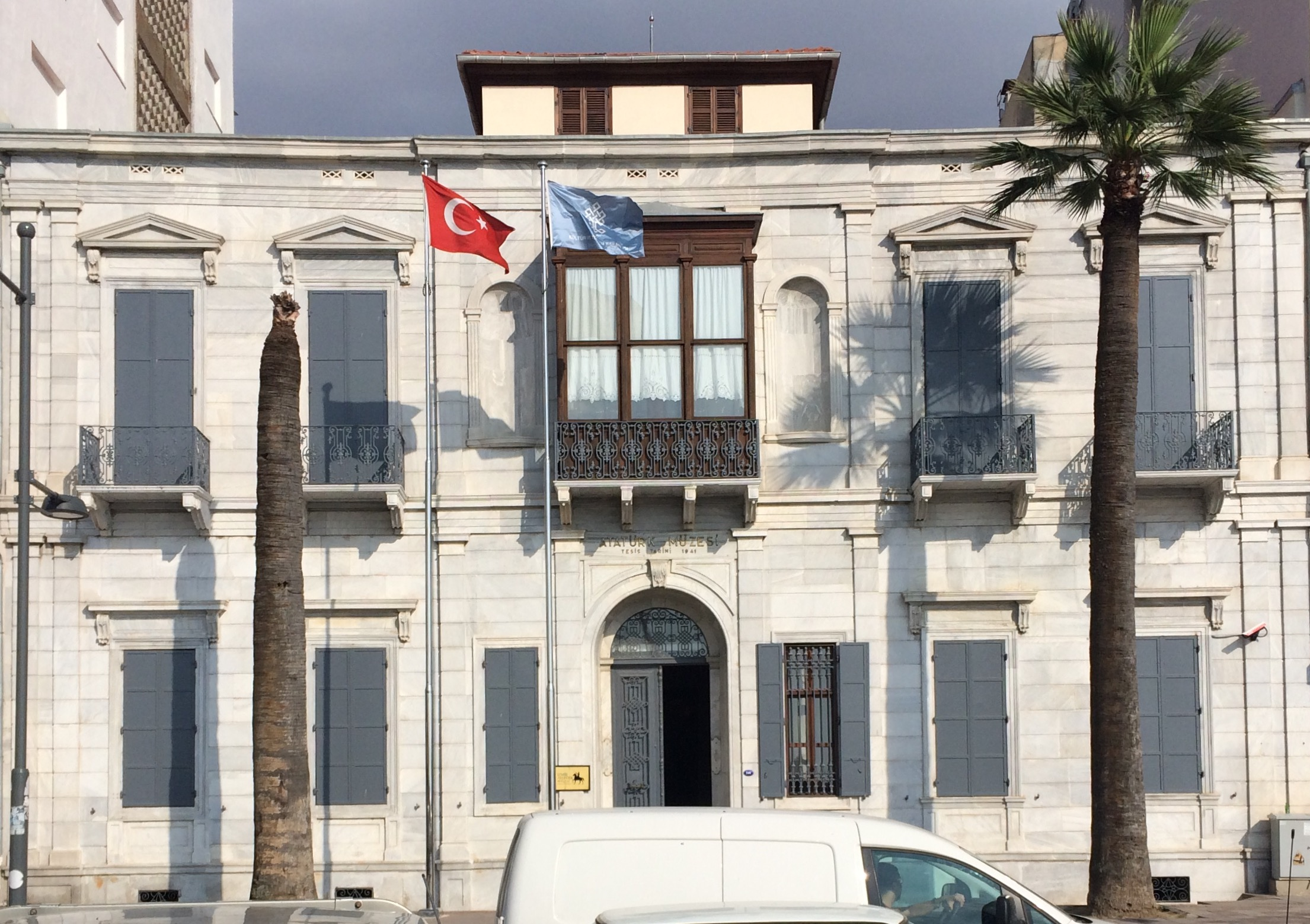
- Facade of museum
- Former name: Naim Palas Hotel
- Established: 1941 September 11
- Location: 1. Kordon (Atatürk Boulevard), Gündoğdu Square, Alsancak, İzmir
- Coordinates: 38°26′8″N 27°8′26″E
- Type: Nationalized private house
- Key holdings: The house and its contents
- Collections: Possessions and writings of Atatürk
- Founder: Mustafa Kemal Atatürk
- Owner: İzmir Municipality

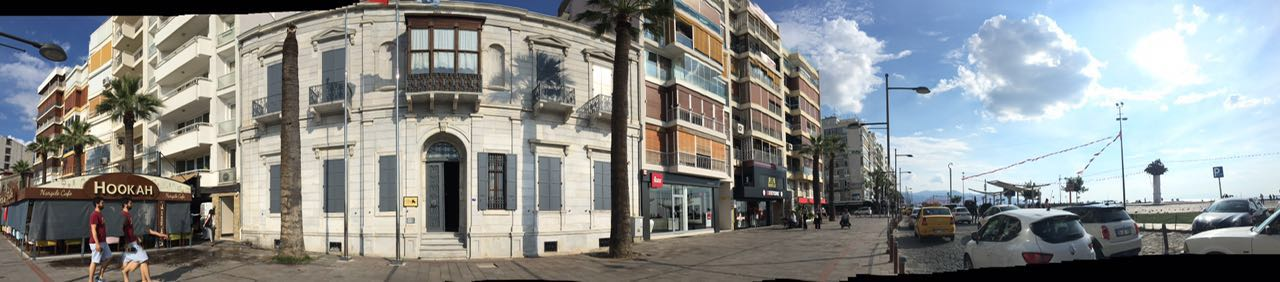
Street panorama

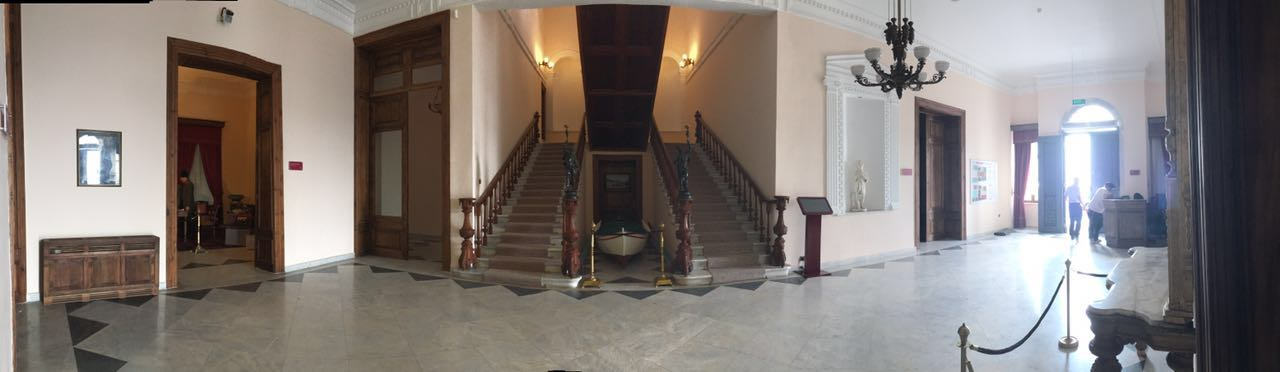
Lobby panorama

The Izmir Atatürk Museum is a museum in İzmir, Turkey. Founded by Mustafa Kemal Atatürk, a Turkish field marshal, revolutionary statesman, and the first president of Turkey, the Izmir Atatürk Museum opened to the public on 11 September 1941, on the 19th anniversary of Atatürk's arrival in Izmir. On 13 May 1988 it was officially named the Izmir Atatürk Museum, which it is called today.

== History ==
Izmir Atatürk Museum was built between 1875 and 1880 by an Armenian carpet merchant, Takfor Spartalian, in 1. Kordon (Atatürk Boulevard), Gündoğdu Square, Alsancak, İzmir. This structure was built as a house, but was abandoned by its owner, after which it was nationalized. For a while, the Turkish Army used the building as its headquarters and Atatürk stayed and carried out his private studies in this building. The Treasury leased it to Naim Bey to be used as a hotel and the hotel was named as Naim Palas. Atatürk and İsmet İnönü stayed in this hotel. İzmir Municipality purchased the building and gave as a gift to Atatürk. After Atatürk's death, the municipality transformed the building into a museum. Today, the building is used as a museum exhibiting the writings of Atatürk and his personal effects.

== Architecture ==
The building was built in downtown Izmir, near the sea. It is surrounded by residential buildings such as apartment complexes, cafes and restaurants. The structure of the building contains influences from Greek and Armenian culture, which differs from the structure of the surrounding classical-style buildings.

The exterior facade is symmetrical, with palm trees also planted in symmetry. On the front facade, there are ten longitudinal and narrow windows, which reflect their own architectural style with the ornaments, a bay window and a high door. There is a high door and a glass part above it, with statuettes and pictures of Greek and Armenian culture inside. The interior doors nearly 4 metres (13 ft) high, and a single style of chandeliers is used. These chandeliers have mechanisms to raise and lower them for changing the candlesticks. There are a large number of mirrors which lend a sense of space, ornamental niches, and some Doric columns in the backyard.

The structure employs stone masonry walls, while the doors, windows, bay window and stairs are wooden, and the basement was furnished with marble flag pavement. In some rooms, carpets were used. In the hall, in the right and left niches, there are some marble statuettes, a large crystal mirror and a bust of Atatürk. Fireplaces from the 19th century are used. In general and for the exterior facades, white and shades of white were used. Sunlight is provided by high doors and windows.

== See also ==
- Atatürk Museums in Turkey
