= Atatürk Museum Mansion =

- Atatürk Müze Köşkü
- Location within Turkey
- Established: 19th Century
- Location: Çankaya Neighborhood, Çankaya Street, Çankaya District, Ankara, 06550
- Coordinates: 39.88707°N 32.86549°E
- Type: House museum

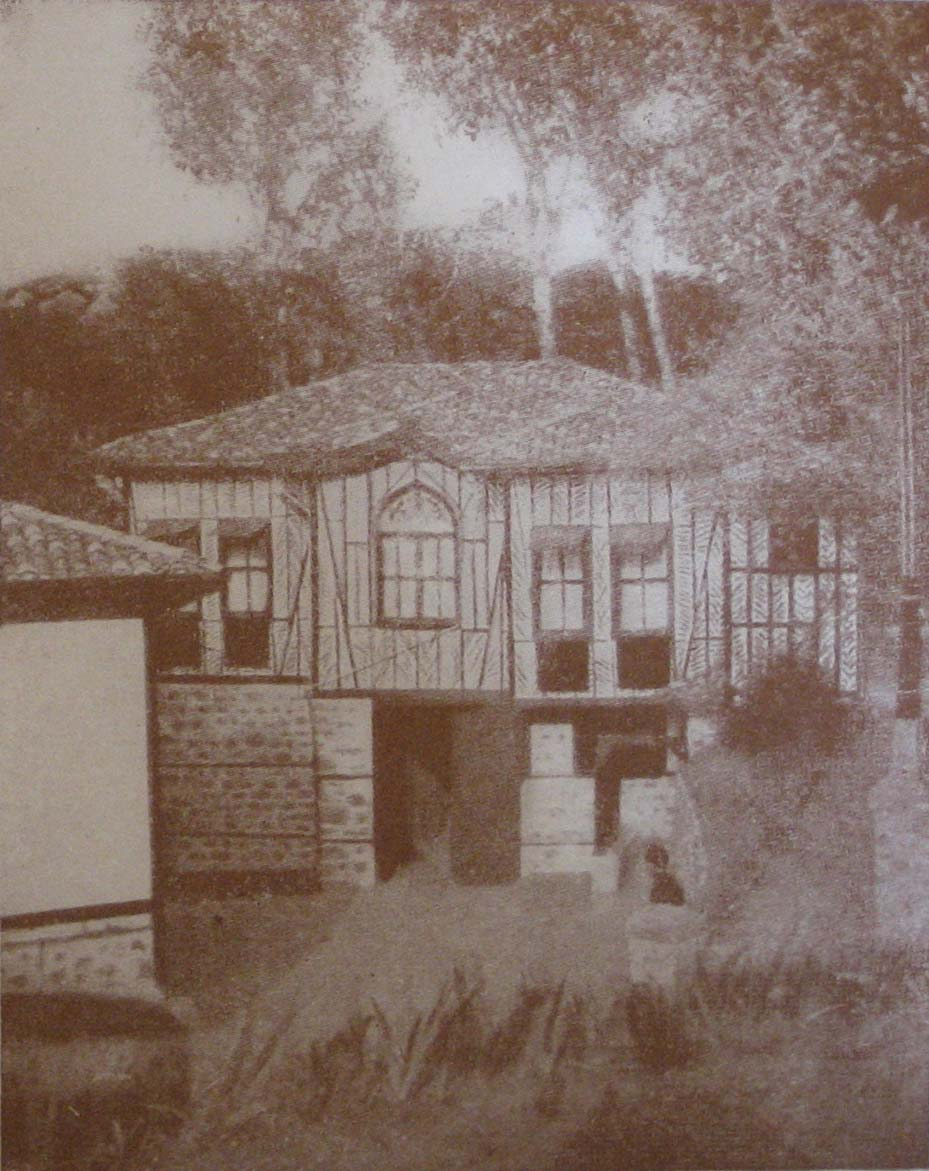
A view of the Presidential Residence in 1923 before any renovation.

Atatürk Museum Mansion (Turkish: Atatürk Müze Köşkü) is a historic house museum in Ankara, Turkey. It was the residence of President Mustafa Kemal Atatürk between 1921 and 1932, during the early years of the Republic. The museum is situated on Çankaya St. within the Çankaya Campus. It is situated right beside the Çankaya Mansion.

== Background ==
The mansion was built as a vineyard lodge in the 19th century. In 1921, it was acquired by two Ankara citizens named Bulgurluzade Mehmet and Rıfat Bey. The municipality of Ankara transformed the house into a presidential residence for the use of Mustafa Kemal Atatürk (1881–1938). On 30 May 1921, it was presented to Atatürk, who had to stay in the School of Agriculture and the master's house of Ankara Train Station following his arrival in Ankara on 27 December 1919 to start the Turkish War of Independence. The mansion became Atatürk's official residence witnessing important historical events during the Turkish War of Independence and the early years of the Republic. It was also the place where Atatürk's reforms were planned. In 1932, the mansion became disused when a new residence, the Çankaya Mansion, a.k.a. the Pink Mansion ("Pembe Köşk"), was built next to it to meet the need of expanding functions.

In 1950, the mansion was opened to the public as a museum. In order not to become dilapidated, and to protect the exhibition items from deterioration, major maintenance works were started in 2002 that lasted until 2007. During these efforts, it was concluded that the site should be used as a historic house rather than as a museum to reflect its natural picture of that era. The Atatürk Museum Mansion was then reopened to the public on 19 April 2009. It was Atatürk's longest-staying residence in his life. It was also called the Army Mansion (Turkish: Ordu Köşkü) after he transferred the building to the Turkish Army.

== Architecture ==
The vineyard lodge was a small building inside a wood landscape. The rectangular-plan house had a sizable terrace overlooking the city in the north. The main hall on the ground floor was flanked by two rooms and had an octagon-formed marble pool with fountain in the center of stony ground. The upper floor had the same plan, consisting of a main hall and two rooms.

After Atatürk's marriage to Latife Uşşaki (1898–1975) on 29 January 1923, the lodge became insufficient for family life. In 1923, architect Vedat Tek (1873–1942) was commissioned with an expansion project. The construction works completed in 1924. A two-story annex with a half-octagon formed tower was added. The ground floor of the annex was used as kitchen and dining room. The upper floor consisted of a bathroom, a bedroom and a study room for the First Lady. The former bedroom in the original building was converted into a library and a study room. A windbreak was built in front of the north entrance. The northeast room on the ground floor was enlarged with a half-octagon formed outbuilding to serve as ambassador reception room. The pool with fountain in the main hall was removed to make place for an entrance hall. A multi-story service building consisting of kitchen and laundry was constructed in the east. This building was connected to the residence with a service stairway.

To solve problems of construction statics arisen after the extension of the building, and to enhance the comfort conditions, maintenance works were carried out in 1926. The building was fitted up with central heating. For Atatürk's adoptive children, a story consisting of six rooms and a bathroom were added to the top of the service building. In 1930, the tower in the southwest was redesigned as a study room for Atatürk.

== Museum ==
Windbreak and Entrance Hall (Rüzgarlık ve Giriş Holü)

The entrance hall is behind a windbreak. The entrance hall has three doors and a stairway leading to the upper floor. On the right side is the Green Room and on left side the Ambassador Reception Room. As furniture, there is a piano and a seating set for six persons. Two paintings and three photographs of Atatürk taken in different times hang on the walls. In front of the barred middle door, a billiard cabinet is placed. Nice rugs hang on this door as curtain.

Green Room (Yeşil Salon)

It is situated on the right hand of the main entrance. Until 1924, it was used as the ambassador reception room and study room of Atatürk. After its renovation, it was yused as a reception room, and was called the "Green Room" due to its major color of green. This room is remembered in the memoirs of many authors with tea party invitations of the First Lady.

Dining Room and Radio-Smoking Room (Yemek Salonu ve Radyo-Sigara Salonu)

This room is on the ground floor of the annex building. Across the room door, there is a tiled, big fireplace flanked by two arched stained glass windows. The walls are covered by wainscot panelling in the lower parts with borders of molding made up from turquoise-colored tiles. The upper part of the walls are painted plain in maroon color. The ceiling is decorated with geometric ornaments. The room is furnished with a large dining table, cupboards and sideboards. In addition, there are a breakfast table for four people and a card playing table. Two phonographs, large Chinese vases and big silver brazier are also part of the room. Two oil paintings of Hüseyin Avni Lifij (1886–1927) hang above the two doors of the room. The splendid Dining Room was known as an important study place of Atatürk because it witnessed long-lasting dinners, at which the problems of the country were discussed and analyzed. The Radio-Smoking Room, accessed through a door from the Dining Room, is situated on the ground floor of the octagonal tower structure. It contains the oldest furniture of the residence, a "Chesterfield suit", a set of quilted leather couch and matching armchairs.

Ambassador Reception Room (Elçi Kabul Salonu)

This room was gained by enlarging the small room of the vineyard lodge after removing the northern outer wall, and adding a space in the form of a half-octagon. It contains a mother-of-pearl inlaid writing table gifted by Abbas Hilmi Pasha (1874–1944), the last Khedive (Ottoman viceroy) of Egypt and Sudan, another writing table used earlier by Atatürk, a seating set and a large closet. Some photographs in framed in mother-of-pearl inlaid hang on the walls.

Upper Floor Hall (Üst Kat Hol)

The rooms on the upper level open up to the Upper Floor Hall. A spacing, which enabled a visual connection between the halls on the ground floor and the upper floor, was closed during the renovation of 1924. The balcony on the northern side of the hall offers an impressive view to the city of Ankara. The billiard table, which Atatürk played on almost every day for recreation, is exhibited here. Initially placed at the upper floor, the billiard table was later moved to the ground floor due statics problems in the flooring. The hall is furnished with an oval table in the middle, a seating set and the showcases, which contain medals of Atatürk, his certificate of mandate for the 1931 general election and the first postage stamps issued with his portrait. İn front of the balcony, a big brazier is placed.

Library (Kütüphane )

The library is the most splendid decorated place in the mansion. It is illuminated by numerous opal glass lamps with geometric and plant motifs. The oven niche in the western wall is covered with turquoise-colored tiles. All walls of the library are covered by wooden book shelves. The library contains a rich collection of books Atatürk had read and his hand-written notes. The armchair and the writing table he used when he inked the Nutuk, the famous speech he delivered in 1927, are part of the library room.

Study Room (Çalışma Odası)

Atatürk's study room is reached by a door in the southern wall of the library. It is designed in Art Deco style. The original ceiling, decorated in Ottoman art style, was painted over white. Metallic objects are in brass while all furniture are in black & white color. A bearskin, which was gifted by Muhtar Bey, the Ambassador of Turkey to Moscow, Soviet Union, is laid on the floor.

Bedroom (Yatak Odası )

It is on the upper floor of the annex building just above the dining room. There is a tiled fireplace in the middle of the southern wall flanked by two big windows. A photograph of Atatürk's mother Zübeyde Hanım (1857–1923), taken in her youth, hangs above the fireplace. A door in the western wall leads to the study room. The big windows, pastel walls and modest decorated ceiling provide a bright and restful place. The room's furniture is utmost elite, however, plain and modest.

Bathroom (Banyo )

The bathroom is accessed through the bedroom. Its design is simple. The washbasin, toilet, bidet and bathtub are all in white as the white porcelain tiles covering the floor and the walls. A door next to the bathtub opens to the stairhead.

Guest Bedroom (Misafir Yatak Odası)

The room on the north side of the original vineyard lodge, which overlooks Ankara, was used as guest bedroom. It keeps its originality with many characteristics such as the cob plastered walls, layers of wall ornaments made in different times and unchanged window proportions.

Exhibition Hall (Sergi Salonu)

It is the former service building. It was converted into an exhibition hall by removing the former separation walls. In this hall, the architecture and the historical change of the building are documented. Personal belongings of Atatürk are on display here.

== Access ==
Access to the Museum Mansion is through the Gate No. 5 of the Çankaya Mansion. It is open to the public between 13:00 and 17:00 local hours everyday but Mondays. At least ten days in advance, a written application is required to make an appointment for visits except weekends, on national holidays and November 10, Atatürk's death day.

== See also ==
- Atatürk Museums in Turkey
