= Oynağan, Şuhut =

Oynağan
- Village
- Location within Turkey Location within Turkey Aegean
- Coordinates: 38°18′N 30°43′E
- Country: Turkey
- Province: Afyonkarahisar
- District: Şuhut
- Population (2021): 184
- Time zone: UTC+3 (TRT)

Oynağan is a village in the Şuhut District, Afyonkarahisar Province, Turkey. Its population is 184 (2021).
