= Atatürk's House (Şuhut) =

Historic house museum in Şuhut, Turkey

Atatürk's House (Great Offensive Headquarters)
- Atatürk Evi (Büyük Taarruz Karargahı)
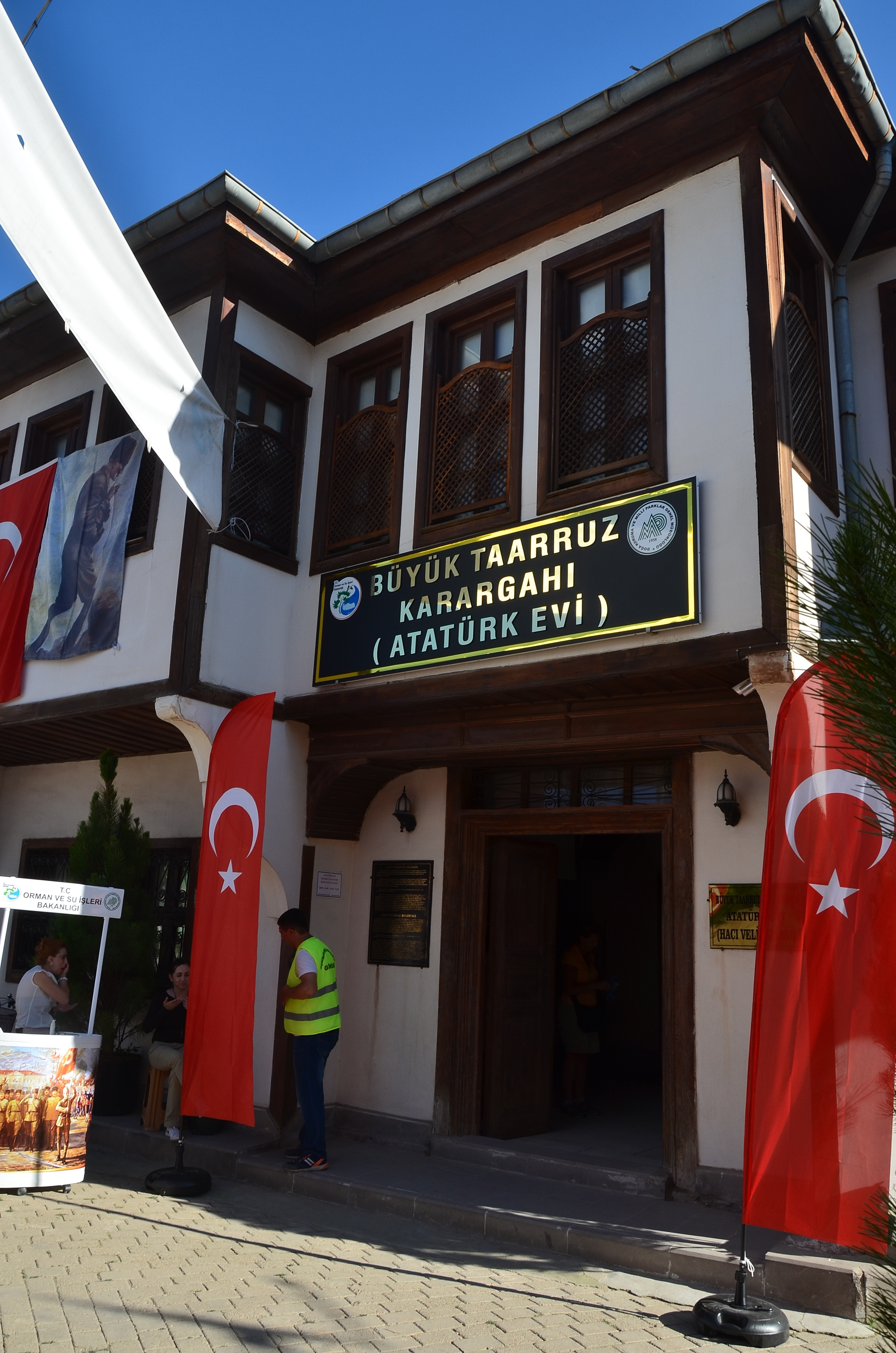

- Location of Atatürk's House, Şuhup in Turkey
- Established: April 19, 2004; 22 years ago
- Location: Şuhut, Afyonkarahisar, Turkey
- Coordinates: 38.53019°N 30.54181°E
- Type: Historic house

The Atatürk's House, also known as Great Offensive Headquarters, (Turkish: Atatürk Evi (Büyük Taarruz Karargahı)) is a historic house museum in Şuhut district of Afyonkarahisar Province, Turkey, which was used as temporary headquarters by then Commander-in-Chief Mustafa Kemal Pasha (Atatürk) right before the Great Offensive in August 1922. The museum was established in 2004 following restorations.

== See also ==
- Atatürk Museums in Turkey
