= Tekke, Şuhut =

Tekke
- Village
- Location within Turkey Location within Turkey Aegean
- Coordinates: 38°29′N 30°27′E
- Country: Turkey
- Province: Afyonkarahisar
- District: Şuhut
- Population (2021): 126
- Time zone: UTC+3 (TRT)

Tekke (also: Tekkeköy) is a village in the Şuhut District, Afyonkarahisar Province, Turkey. Its population is 126 (2021).
