= Silifke Atatürk Museum =

Atatürk's residence in 1925

- Silifke Atatürk Müzesi
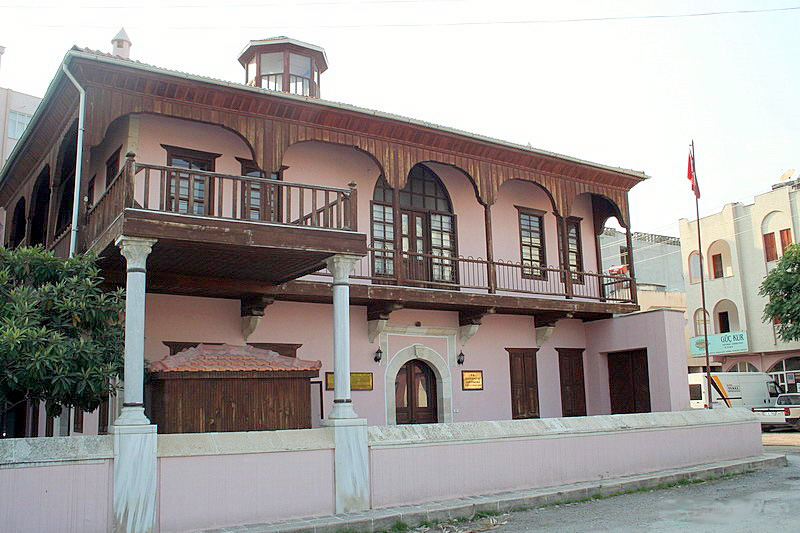

- Silifke Atatürk Museum
- Established: 1987; 39 years ago
- Location: Silifke, Turkey
- Coordinates: 36°22′37″N 33°55′41″E
- Type: Memorial House, Ethnography
- Collections: Turkey, Ottoman Empire
- Owner: Ministry of Culture and Tourism

Silifke Atatürk Museum (Turkish: Silifke Atatürk Evi Müzesi) is a two-storey house in Silifke which hosted the founder of modern Turkey, Mustafa Kemal Atatürk, and his wife in 1925.

== Location ==
Silifke is an ilçe (district) of Mersin Province, Turkey. The museum is in the city, northwest of the Jupiter's temple ruins.

== History ==
The owner of the building was Hacı Hulusi, the mayor of Silifke in 1925. During his visit to Silifke, Atatürk stayed in his house. After the death of Hacı Hulusi, the house was inherited by his heirs. In 1982, however, the Ministry of Culture bought the house. In 1987, following repairs, the house was opened as an Atatürk Museum.

== The building ==
The total area of the building (including the yard) is 329 square metres (3,540 sq ft). The ground floor is a library and the office. The upper floor is dedicated to Atatürk's memory. This section is ethnographical in character. In addition to various household items from the 1920s, there is a gun with Atatürk's initials on it, which was presented to him during his 1925 visit, and documents about his farm near Silifke.

== See also ==
- Atatürk Museums in Turkey
