= Dadak, Şuhut =

Dadak
- Village
- Location within Turkey Location within Turkey Aegean
- Coordinates: 38°36′N 30°27′E
- Country: Turkey
- Province: Afyonkarahisar
- District: Şuhut
- Population (2021): 577
- Time zone: UTC+3 (TRT)

Dadak is a village in the Şuhut District, Afyonkarahisar Province, Turkey. Its population is 577 (2021).
