= Senir, Şuhut =

Senir
- Village
- Location within Turkey Location within Turkey Aegean
- Country: Turkey
- Province: Afyonkarahisar
- District: Şuhut
- Population (2021): 473
- Time zone: UTC+3 (TRT)

Senir (also: Sinirköy) is a village in the Şuhut District, Afyonkarahisar Province, Turkey. Its population is 473 (2021).
