= Ağzıkara, Şuhut =

Ağzıkara
- Village
- Location within Turkey Location within Turkey Aegean
- Coordinates: 38.58393°N 30.56101°E
- Country: Turkey
- Province: Afyonkarahisar
- District: Şuhut
- Population (2021): 632
- Time zone: UTC+3 (TRT)

Ağzıkara is a village in the Şuhut District, Afyonkarahisar Province, Turkey. Its population is 632 (2021).
