= Atatürk Museum (Adana) =

Museum in Adana, Turkey

Coordinates: 36°59′19″N 35°19′55″E

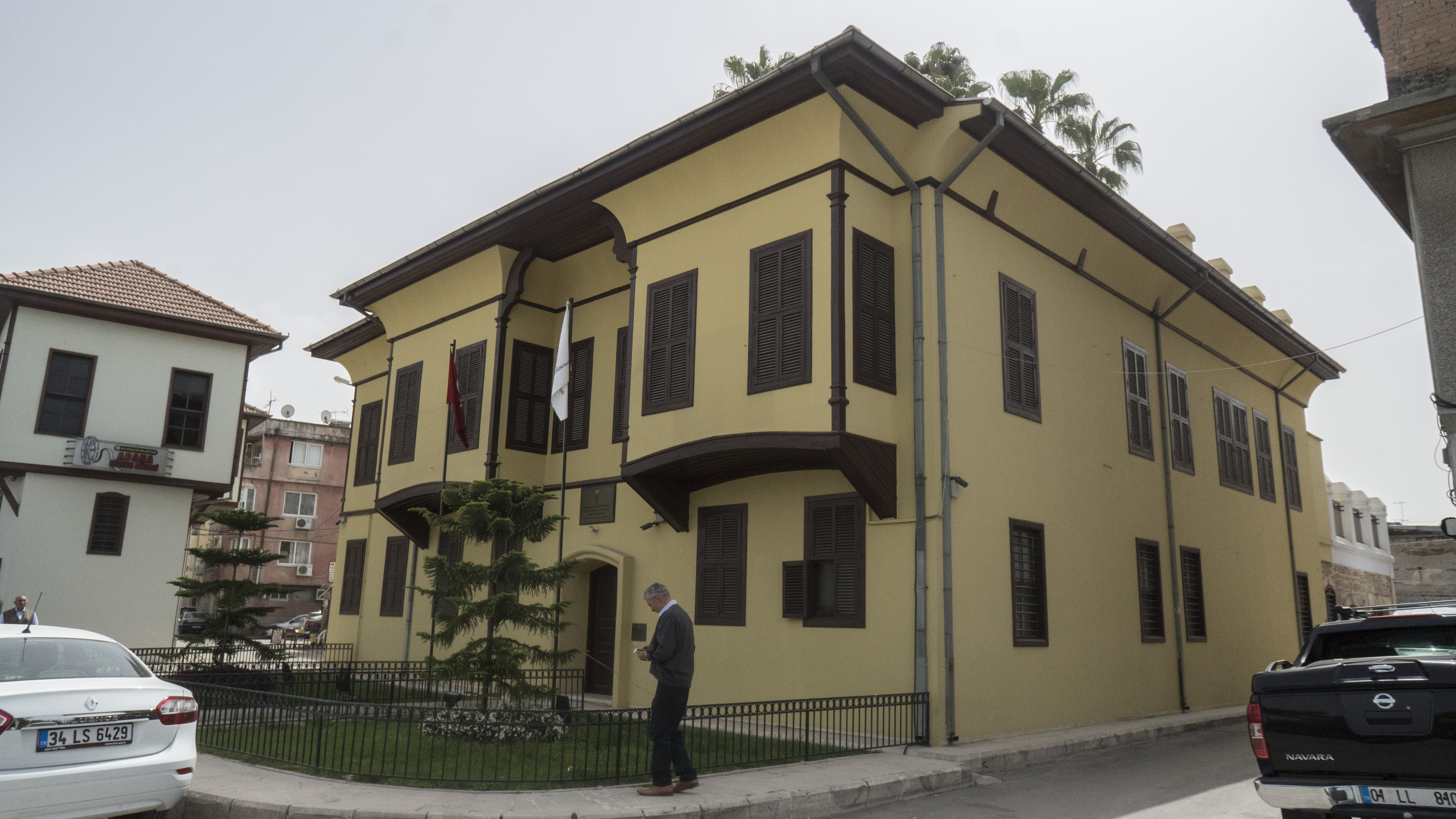
- Established: 1981
- Location: Seyhan Street, Adana, Turkey

Atatürk Museum exhibits War of Independence and the first years of Republic at the mansion, Atatürk stayed during his trips to Adana. Overlooking to the Seyhan River, the museum is located on Seyhan Street and it is open to public every day except Mondays. Atatürk's visit to Adana is officially celebrated in this building every year on 15 March.

== History ==
The museum building was built in the 19th century as a mansion by Subhi Pasha (Ramazanoğlu). Atatürk and his wife stayed in this mansion during their visit to Adana on March 15, 1923. The building was expropriated and restored by the "Atatürk Scientific and Cultural Conservation and Revival Society", under the guidance of Army Corps commander Bedrettin Demirel via donations. It was opened to public as a museum in 1981, administered by the Directorate of Museums.

== Architecture ==
The museum building is one of the traditional row houses of Tepebağ. A two-story structure is built of brick and stone with bay windows and pitch roof. Because of its peculiar characteristics, it is classified as "Cultural Real Estate under Conservation" by the Ministry and preserved in its original state.

== Inside the museum ==
At the ground floor, there is the study room and the library. In the study room, the newspapers Yeni Adana, Türk Sözü, Çukurova and Dirlik which were published during and after the Independence War, are displayed. In the library, nearly two thousand books, written in Ottoman (Arabic alphabet) and Turkish (Latin alphabet) are on display. Most of the books are obtained by donations.

There are several rooms open to public at the upper floor. Atatürk's wax statue made by retired officer Nevzat Duruak is exhibited in the Anteroom. In the bedroom, Atatürk's brass bedstead, silver threaded quilt and tablecloth, traditional Maraş style two armchairs and a wardrobe are exhibited. In the study room, there is an armchair, a table and chairs, a telephone, a cupboard and Atatürk's portrait are exhibited. There are bound volumes of "Yeni Adana" newspaper in a showcase and framed photos of the newspaper staff in the Press Room. Warrior's Room displays the portraits of Gani Girici and his fellow warriors, Gani Girici's medal of honour and a clock stopped at 9.05 in memory of Atatürk's time of death. A walnut chair, a narghile, a metal brazier, kilims and rugs are exhibited in the Lounge Room.

During Atatürk's visit to Adana, an envoy from French occupied Hatay headed by Ayse Fitnat Hanim was received by Atatürk and presented him with black roses. Atatürk's response to that gesture was "Centuries-old Turkish land will not be allowed to be held by the enemy". In the Hatay Room, there are mannequins to depict this event. Also, in this room an engraved walnut coffee table, a Turkish flag and various photos of the members of the envoy are on display.

In the Armoury, various types and calibers of rifles, pistols, generals' epaulets, a model of the house where Atatürk was born, a sample of the stone from Osmaniye which was used in Atatürk's tomb in Anitkabir and also some collections of antique coins in a showcase are displayed. In Atatürk's Adjutant's room a brass bedstead, a silver threaded quilt, a walnut overlaid wardrobe, a metal bowl and an ewer are on display. In the Kuva-i Milliye Room, The busts of Atatürk, Ismet Inönü and other members of Kuva-i Milliye who initiated the movement and whom people distinguished for their efforts during that period are displayed.

== See also ==
- Atatürk Museums in Turkey
