= Efe, Şuhut =

Efe
- Village
- Location within Turkey Location within Turkey Aegean
- Coordinates: 38°36′N 30°38′E
- Country: Turkey
- Province: Afyonkarahisar
- District: Şuhut
- Population (2021): 1,196
- Time zone: UTC+3 (TRT)

Efe is a village in the Şuhut District, Afyonkarahisar Province, Turkey. Its population is 1,196 (2021). Before the 2013 reorganisation, it was a town (belde).
