= Kılınçkaya, Şuhut =

Kılınçkaya
- Village
- Location within Turkey Location within Turkey Aegean
- Coordinates: 38°19′N 30°45′E
- Country: Turkey
- Province: Afyonkarahisar
- District: Şuhut
- Population (2021): 137
- Time zone: UTC+3 (TRT)

Kılınçkaya is a village in the Şuhut District, Afyonkarahisar Province, Turkey. Its population is 137 (2021).
