= Paşacık, Şuhut =

Paşacık
- Village
- Location within Turkey Location within Turkey Aegean
- Coordinates: 38.4935°N 30.6849°E
- Country: Turkey
- Province: Afyonkarahisar
- District: Şuhut
- Population (2021): 98
- Time zone: UTC+3 (TRT)

Paşacık is a village in the Şuhut District, Afyonkarahisar Province, Turkey. Its population is 98 (2021).
