= Bademli, Şuhut =

Bademli
- Village
- Location within Turkey Location within Turkey Aegean
- Coordinates: 38.4108°N 30.6094°E
- Country: Turkey
- Province: Afyonkarahisar
- District: Şuhut
- Population (2021): 300
- Time zone: UTC+3 (TRT)

Bademli is a village in the Şuhut District, Afyonkarahisar Province, Turkey. Its population is 300 (2021).
