= Arızlı, Şuhut =

Arızlı
- Village
- Location within Turkey Location within Turkey Aegean
- Coordinates: 38.3203°N 30.7500°E
- Country: Turkey
- Province: Afyonkarahisar
- District: Şuhut
- Population (2021): 237
- Time zone: UTC+3 (TRT)

Arızlı is a village in the Şuhut District, Afyonkarahisar Province, Turkey. Its population is 237 (2021).
