= Balçıkhisar, Şuhut =

Balçıkhisar
- Village
- Location within Turkey Location within Turkey Aegean
- Coordinates: 38.4397°N 30.5192°E
- Country: Turkey
- Province: Afyonkarahisar
- District: Şuhut
- Population (2021): 1,304
- Time zone: UTC+3 (TRT)

Balçıkhisar is a village in the Şuhut District, Afyonkarahisar Province, Turkey. Its population is 1,304 (2021). Before the 2013 reorganisation, it was a town (belde).
