= Tepebağ =

- Neighbourhood
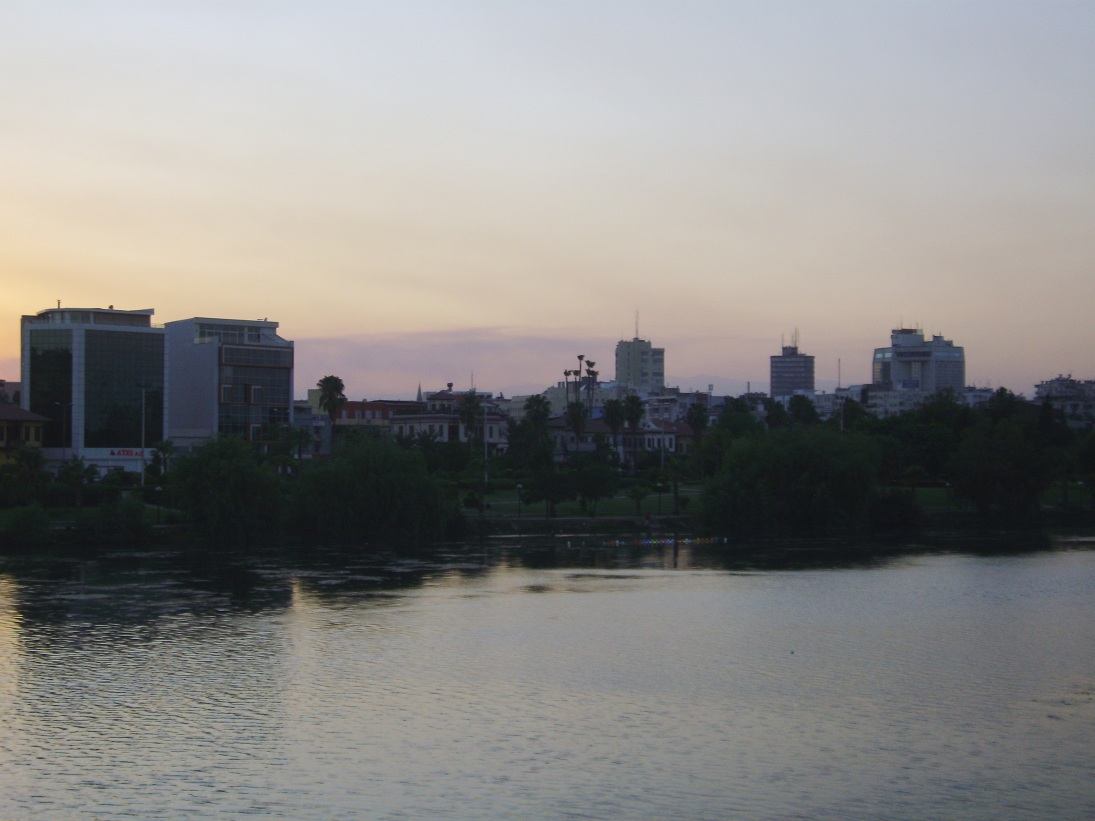
- Tepebağ from the Seyhan river

- Location within Turkey
- Coordinates: 36°59′17″N 35°19′38″E
- Country: Turkey
- Province: Adana
- District: Seyhan

Government
  - Muhtar: Mehmet Demir
- Elevation: 23 m (75 ft)
- Population (2022): 903
- Time zone: UTC+3 (TRT)
- Area code: 0322

Tepebağ (English: Orchard Hill) is a neighbourhood (mahalle) in the municipality and district of Seyhan, Adana Province, Turkey. Its population is 903 (2022). It is a historical neighborhood in the old town of Adana. It is situated on a hill overlooking the Seyhan River on the west, steps away from the Taşköprü, and reflects the traditional housing architecture of the city. Tumulus at Tepebağ is the area of the first settlements in Adana.

== History ==
Throughout the history, Adana was re-built several times at the area of the Tepebağ Tumulus. The city architecture did not develop much until the mid 19th century due to the nomadic living styles of the Turkmens and Yörüks living in the city, and the re-construction of the buildings along the Seyhan River which get frequently destroyed by the floods.

Until the late 19th century, Adana consisted of one-story houses made of mud brick. During this period, the city had a rapid development with the improvements on the Seyhan River, the increase in the cotton yield and with the development of the manufacturing industry. The period of development also affected the architecture in which the mud brick homes were replaced with 2-3 story structured durable houses. These are the building styles which could exist to present and were named the Traditional Adana Houses.

== Architecture ==
The developments in Tepebağ was on the hill and down the hill to the plain. Houses were designed depending on being built on the areas with slope or at the plain areas. Most of the houses are 2-3 story and made up of ground, mezzanine and main floors. Depending on the land, some houses are made up of basement, ground and main floors. Building were built mostly by brick stacking or with wooden structure. In the neighborhood, there are also concrete structured newer buildings.

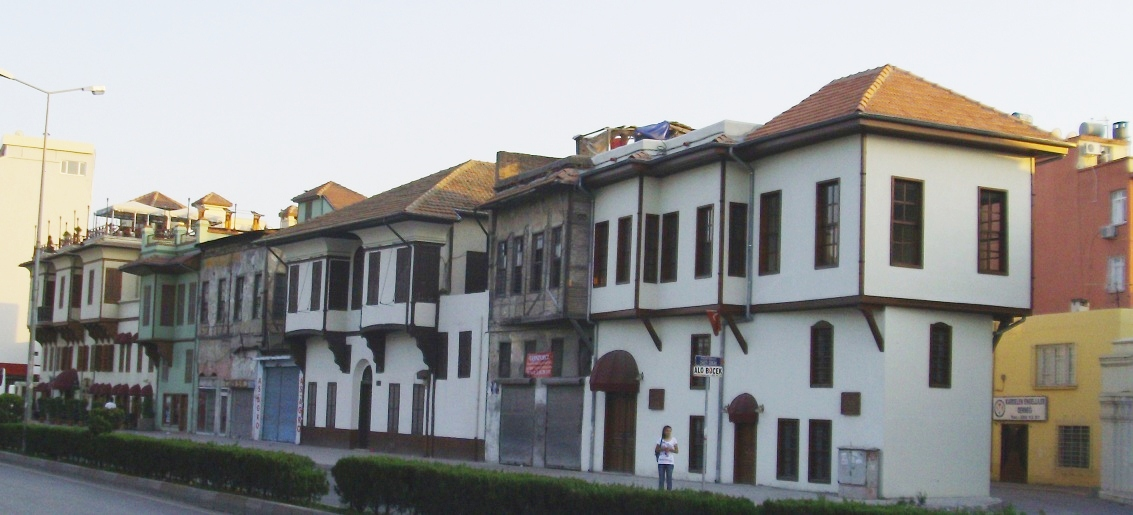
Rowhouses of Tepebağ

Despite the heavy use of stone in neighboring towns, the residential architecture of Adana is mostly made of bricks. Traditional architecture of the city is developed with the effect of the hot and humid climate of the Mediterranean. At the traditional houses, thick walls, few windows, stony places and inner courtyards are seen on the ground floors. At the upper floors, row windows and projections are common, and together with the plain earth roofs and eaves, the architecture corresponds to the climate.

Traditional homes are built attached on narrow and curly streets to very small lots. At the urban sprawl that is formed with lining up of these houses, streets have different widths and there are many streets with no exit.

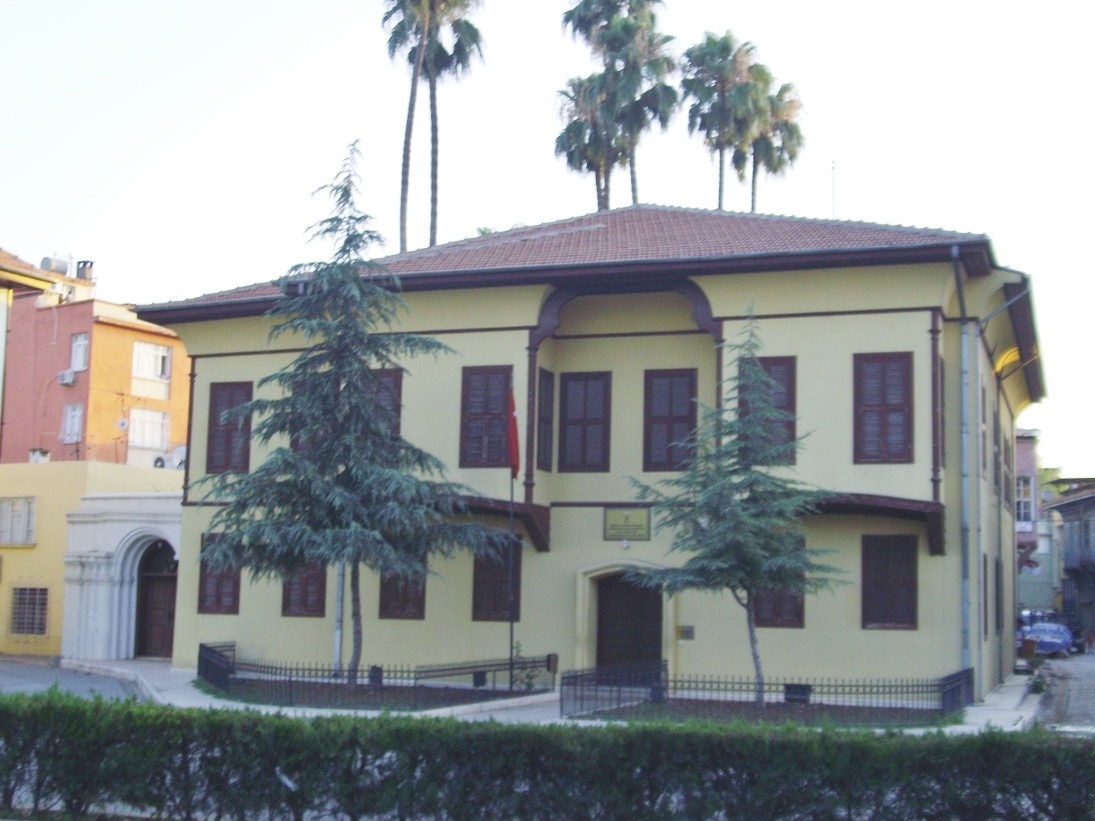
Suphi Paşa Mansion converted into Atatürk Museum

The mansions that were built along the Seyhan River at the end of the 19th century, and at the beginning of the 20th century are the elegant samples of the traditional residential architecture. These buildings can go up to 4-story and have rooftop terraces that have extensive view with a cooling breeze. They differ significantly from the modest houses of the hill, with the architecture, street-building and courtyard-lot relation, lot size and the roof styling. Besides being taller, these mansions have bigger lots and the ground floors directly open up to the street without courtyards and the buildings are fit on the entire lots. The mansions, which are referred to as Row Mansions locally, are the first registered buildings with historical value. Among these the Hacı Yunuszade Mehmet Efendi and the Bosnalı Salih Efendi mansions at the south end are noteworthy to mention. The latter's main hall is lighted with an octagon bright lantern. At the northwest of these row mansions, Suphi Paşa mansion stands in well shape and has been used as a museum (Atatürk Museum) since 1981. This building has seen an extensive restoration after the Adana–Ceyhan earthquake in 1998.

Houses at Tepebağ have characteristics very different from those of the older Kuruköprü, Hanedan, İstiklal and Döşeme neighborhoods. The differences can be noticeable from the building fronts which tend to be larger.

=== Buildings and the surrounding area ===
Buildings are located in a way to receive the cooling effects of the winds easily. Buildings are fit on the street fronts of the lots and courtyards are formed in the rear section. Fully surrounded by walls or building sections, the inner courtyards are small and shaded. By facing the living spaces toward the courtyard, each house has a distinctive open, semi-open and closed settings. During the early 20th century the houses with courtyards are replaced with houses that are fully fit on the lots without courtyards. At these buildings, entrance is directly to the living spaces.

=== Internal design ===
Traditional Adana houses are mostly two-story and the samples of bungalows are rare. Besides this, there are also three-story buildings which are made up of a ground floor, mezzanine and an upper floor. At the three-story houses entrance is usually from the stony place, but there are also samples where the courtyard is at the street front and the entrance is from the courtyard. At the ground floor, after the stony place which is at the height of two floors, the courtyard and the stairs are placed. At this floor, there are also storage rooms, pantry and similar spaces for service. The mezzanine, which is built above the service spaces of the ground floor, functions as a floor used only in the winter with the low ceiling and with the thick walls that have small windows. It is typical to have a kitchen with oven at this floor. At the houses with no mezzanine floor, kitchen is usually placed at the corner of the main hall or the courtyard.

At the traditional houses, upper floors are the main living spaces and are designed mostly with outer or inner halls also seen in many settlements of Anatolia. According to the function and the location of the hall many different designs are created. At the plans with outer hall, halls face south and the rooms are located with sides to the street and to the hall. The rooms are placed next to the hall in a way that will leave two or three sides of the hall open. The plans with inner halls possess a long, narrow hall with rooms at both sides and enriched with a side hall, stair hall or an iwan depending on the need. Front of the houses with inner halls are generally faced southward.
