= Denizli Atatürk and Ethnography Museum =

Museum in Turkey

Denizli Museum
- Denizli Müzesi
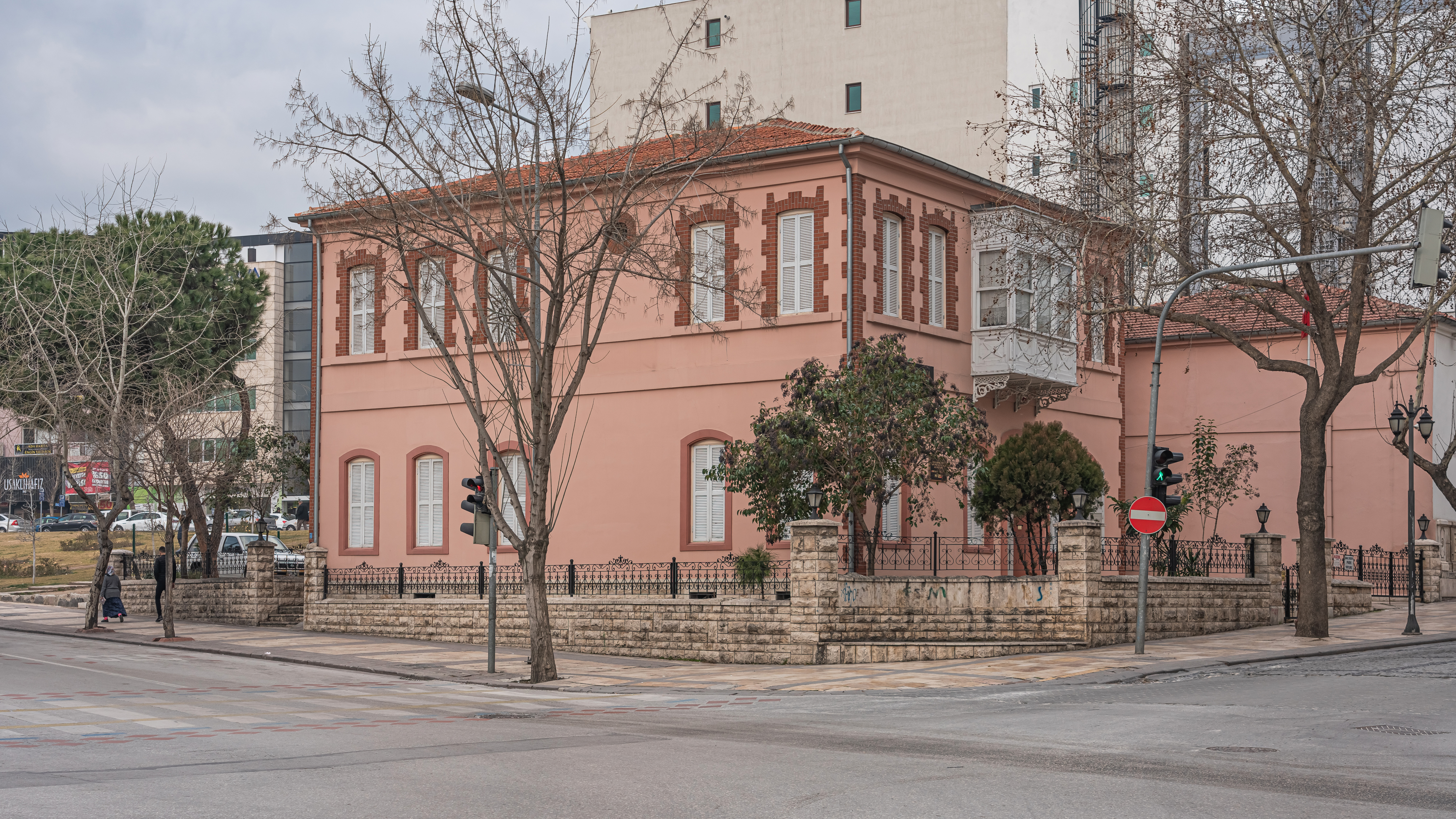

- Denizli Museum
- Established: 1984; 42 years ago
- Location: Saraylar Mah. Kayalık Cad. 459 Sok. 10 Denizli, Turkey
- Coordinates: 37°46′59″N 29°05′06″E
- Type: Historic house, ethnographic
- Collections: Ottoman Empire
- Owner: Ministry of Culture and Tourism

Denizli Museum, also known as Denizli Atatürk and Ethnography Museum (Turkish: Denizli Atatürk ve Etnoğrafya Müzesi), is a national museum in Denizli, Turkey. Established in 1984, it is a historic house museum dedicated to Atatürk, exhibiting ethnographical items. The museum is a 19th-century two-story house on 459th Street of the Saraylar neighborhood of Denizli.

== History ==
Atatürk, the founder of modern Turkey, visited Denizli on 4 February 1931 and stayed in this house. It was bought by the Ministry of Culture and established as a museum, opening on 4 February 1984, on the 53rd anniversary of Atatürk's visit.

== Exhibits ==
The ground floor is the ethnographical section. Ornaments, silver tools, woodwork etc., are displayed in the small rooms. The big room is reserved for weapons such as yatagans, swords, rifles, guns, and more. A flag used in a meeting during the War of Independence in 1919, and the uniform of Hüseyin Efe, a local hero of the 1920s, are also exhibited in this room. In three rooms of the upper floor, the lifestyle of Denizli citizens was depicted by mannequins. Two rooms are dedicated to Atatürk, which were occupied by him during his visit in 1931. The anteroom stores an oil painting by İbrahim Çallı and various house furniture donated by Necip Ali Küçüka, a former Turkish politician and jurist.
