= Güneytepe, Şuhut =

Güneytepe
- Village
- Location within Turkey Location within Turkey Aegean
- Coordinates: 38.4739°N 30.5411°E
- Country: Turkey
- Province: Afyonkarahisar
- District: Şuhut
- Population (2021): 375
- Time zone: UTC+3 (TRT)

Güneytepe is a village in the Şuhut District, Afyonkarahisar Province, Turkey. Its population is 375 (2021).
