= Mahmutköy, Şuhut =

Mahmutköy
- Village
- Location within Turkey Location within Turkey Aegean
- Coordinates: 38°30′10″N 30°32′36″E
- Country: Turkey
- Province: Afyonkarahisar
- District: Şuhut
- Population (2021): 1,601
- Time zone: UTC+3 (TRT)

Mahmutköy (also: Mahmut) is a village in the Şuhut District, Afyonkarahisar Province, Turkey. Its population is 1,601 (2021).
