= Aydın, Şuhut =

Aydın
- Village
- Location within Turkey Location within Turkey Aegean
- Coordinates: 38.5062°N 30.4783°E
- Country: Turkey
- Province: Afyonkarahisar
- District: Şuhut
- Population (2021): 557
- Time zone: UTC+3 (TRT)

Aydın is a village in the Şuhut District, Afyonkarahisar Province, Turkey. Its population is 557 (2021).
