= Sakarya Museum =

Museum in Adapazarı, Turkey

- Sakarya Müzesi
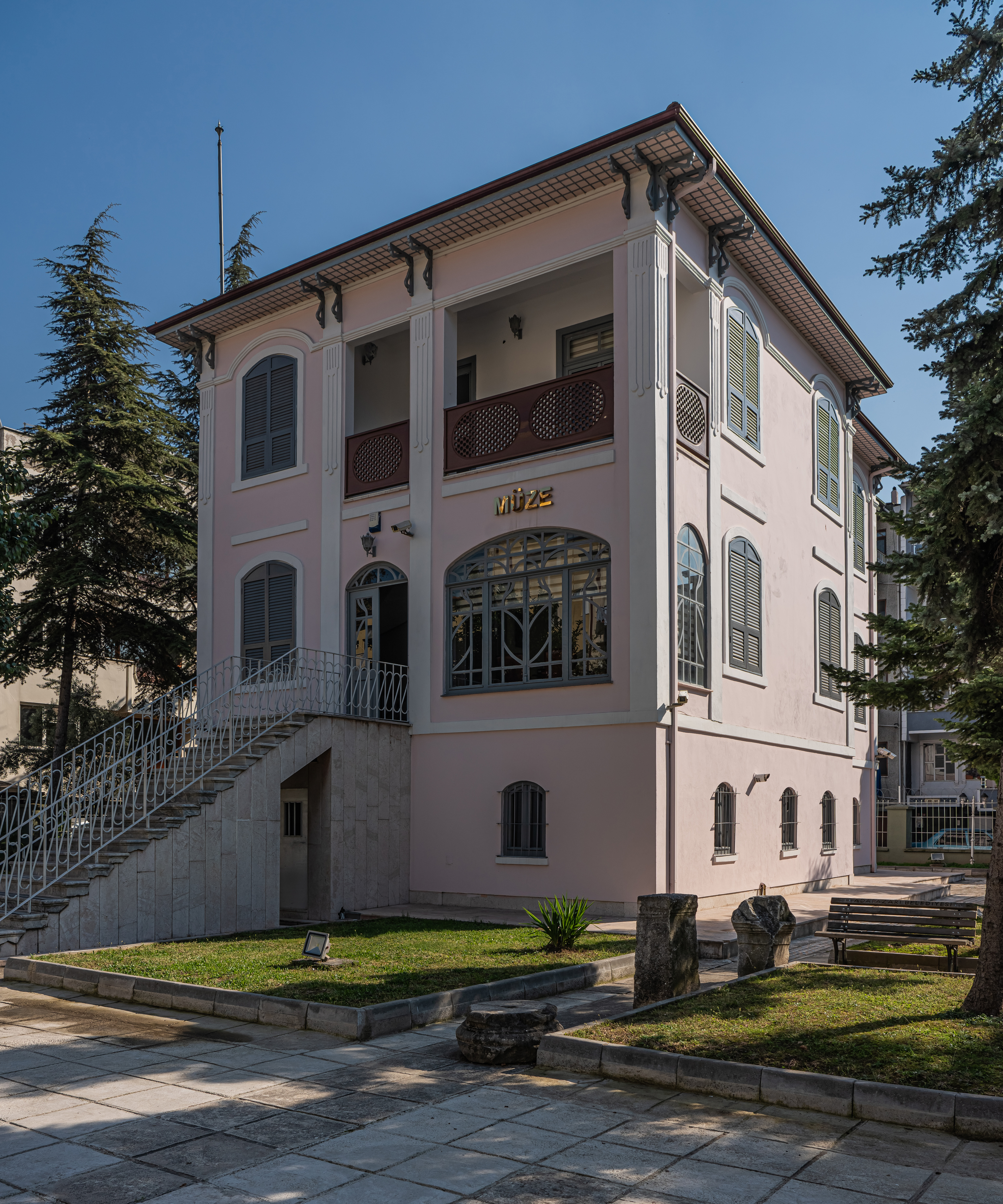

- Location of the Sakarya Museum in Turkey
- Established: 1993; 33 years ago
- Coordinates: 40°46′26″N 30°24′06″E
- Type: Archaeology, Ethnography
- Owner: Ministry of Culture

Sakarya Museum (a.k.a. Adapazarı Museum Turkish: Sakarya Müzesi) is a museum in Adapazarı, Turkey. It is on Milli Egemenlik Street.

The museum building was constructed in 1915 as a residence by Major Baha Bey, the Chairman of Military Service Office. In 1983, it was purchased by the Ministry of Culture, and on 21 June 1993, it was opened as a museum. The building was damaged during the 1999 İzmit earthquake. After restoration, it was reopened on 28 June 2003.

The total area of the house and the yard is 1,290 square metres (13,900 sq ft). In addition to the exhibition halls and offices, the building has a conference room and an art gallery. In the exhibition hall of the museum, both archaeological and ethnographical items are exhibited. Exhibited items from the prehistoric era, and the Roman and Byzantine Empires include axes, terracota pottery, eye drop and scent bottles, and metallic and glass items. The ethnographic items of the Ottoman Empire and Turkey include weapons, copper tools, stamps and embroidery. There are also some belongings of Mustafa Kemal Pasha (later Atatürk) who met his mother in this house in 1922.
