= Çobankaya, Şuhut =

Çobankaya
- Village
- Location within Turkey Location within Turkey Aegean
- Coordinates: 38.4381°N 30.6294°E
- Country: Turkey
- Province: Afyonkarahisar
- District: Şuhut
- Population (2021): 364
- Time zone: UTC+3 (TRT)

Çobankaya is a village in the Şuhut District, Afyonkarahisar Province, Turkey. Its population is 364 (2021).
