= İcikli, Şuhut =

İcikli
- Village
- Location within Turkey Location within Turkey Aegean
- Coordinates: 38.4178°N 30.6842°E
- Country: Turkey
- Province: Afyonkarahisar
- District: Şuhut
- Population (2021): 444
- Time zone: UTC+3 (TRT)

İcikli is a village in the Şuhut District, Afyonkarahisar Province, Turkey. Its population is 444 (2021).
