= Koçyatağı, Şuhut =

Koçyatağı
- Village
- Location within Turkey Location within Turkey Aegean
- Coordinates: 38.5576°N 30.4838°E
- Country: Turkey
- Province: Afyonkarahisar
- District: Şuhut
- Population (2021): 284
- Time zone: UTC+3 (TRT)

Koçyatağı is a village in the Şuhut District, Afyonkarahisar Province, Turkey. Its population is 284 (2021).
