= Başören, Şuhut =

Başören
- Village
- Location within Turkey Location within Turkey Aegean
- Coordinates: 38.4647°N 30.4314°E
- Country: Turkey
- Province: Afyonkarahisar
- District: Şuhut
- Population (2021): 728
- Time zone: UTC+3 (TRT)

Başören is a village in the Şuhut District, Afyonkarahisar Province, Turkey. Its population is 728 (2021).
