= Atatürk Museum (Thessaloniki) =

Coordinates: 40°38′8.8″N 22°57′16.3″E

- Atatürk Evi Müzesi
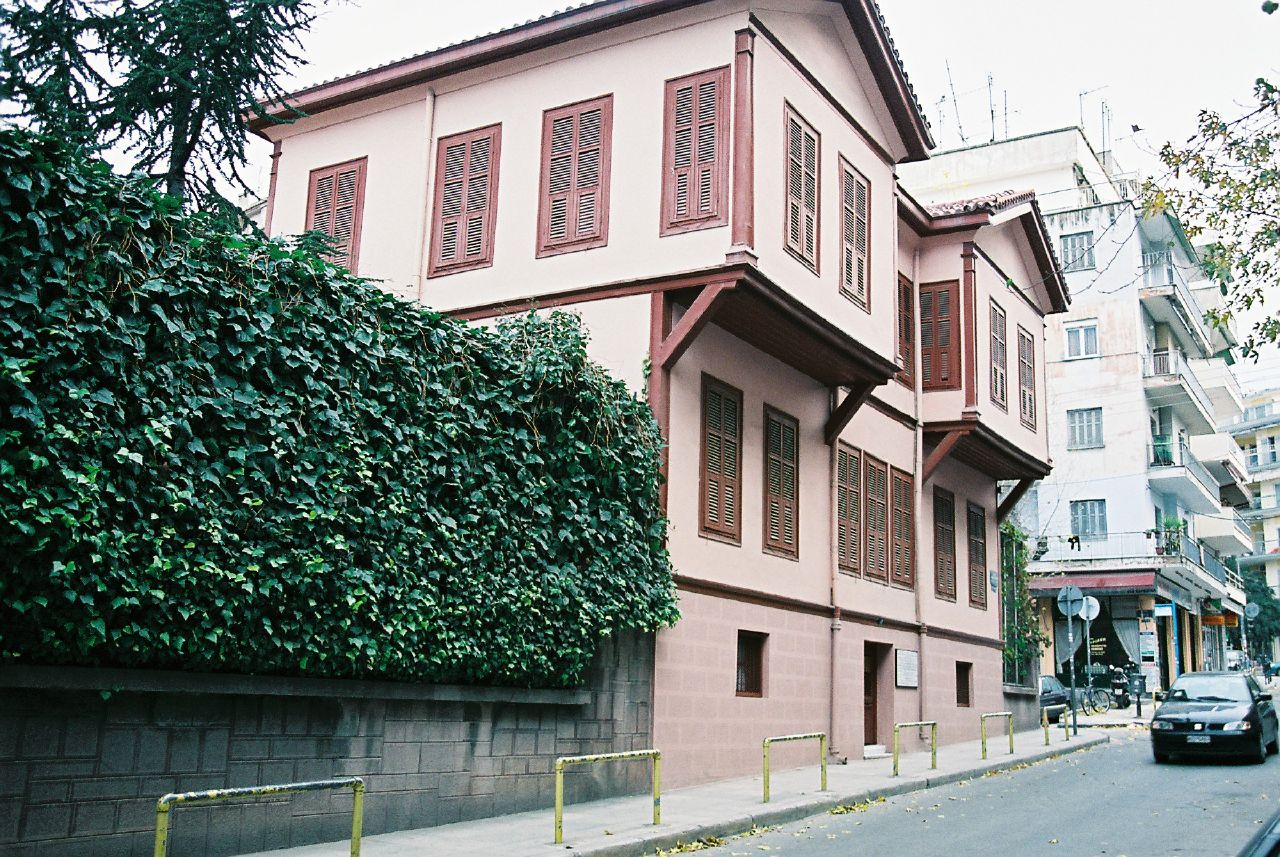
- Ataturk's house in Thessaloniki, part of the Turkish consulate complex.

- Location within Greece Location within Europe
- Established: 1953
- Location: Thessaloniki, Greece
- Type: Historic house museum
- Public transit access: Sintrivani
- Website: Turkish consulate

Atatürk Museum (Greek: Μουσείο Ατατούρκ, Mousío Atatúrk; Turkish: Atatürk Evi Müzesi, "Atatürk House Museum") is a historic house museum in Thessaloniki, Central Macedonia, Greece.

== Overview ==
The house is the birthplace of the founder of modern Turkey, Mustafa Kemal Atatürk, who was born here in 1881 when Salonika was still part of the Ottoman Empire. It is a three-floor house with a courtyard on 17 Apostolou Pavlou Street, next to the Turkish Consulate.

There are four rooms on the ground floor. On the 1st floor is the reception room, with European sofas, a large console table, and a chased brazier; a large sitting-room, with low banquettes around the walls; Kemal's mother's room, with a bed, a banquette, and a trunk; and the kitchen, equipped with contemporary cooking utensils. The most impressive room on the 2nd floor is the one in which Kemal was born, a large room with a banquette, his desk, and a large brazier. It faces another room, in which some of Kemal's personal effects from Ankara are displayed. These include formal dress, smoking requisites, cutlery, cups, and other items. All the documents relating to Kemal's schooldays have been hung on the walls. A pomegranate tree planted by Kemal's father still grows in the courtyard.

The building was repaired in 1981 and was repainted to its original pink. Most of the furniture is authentic. Any missing items were replaced with furniture from Kemal's mausoleum and from Topkapi Palace in Istanbul. There are photographs on all the walls of Kemal at various periods of his life.

== History ==
Before the capture of Thessaloniki by the Kingdom of Greece in 1912, it was known as "Koca Kasım Paşa district" during Ottoman rule. It was built before 1870 and in 1935 the Thessaloniki City Council gave it to the Turkish State, which decided to convert it into a museum dedicated to Mustafa Kemal Atatürk. Until the Istanbul pogrom of 1955, the street in front of the house was named "Kemal Ataturk".

In 1981, a replica of the house was built in Ankara.

== Gallery ==
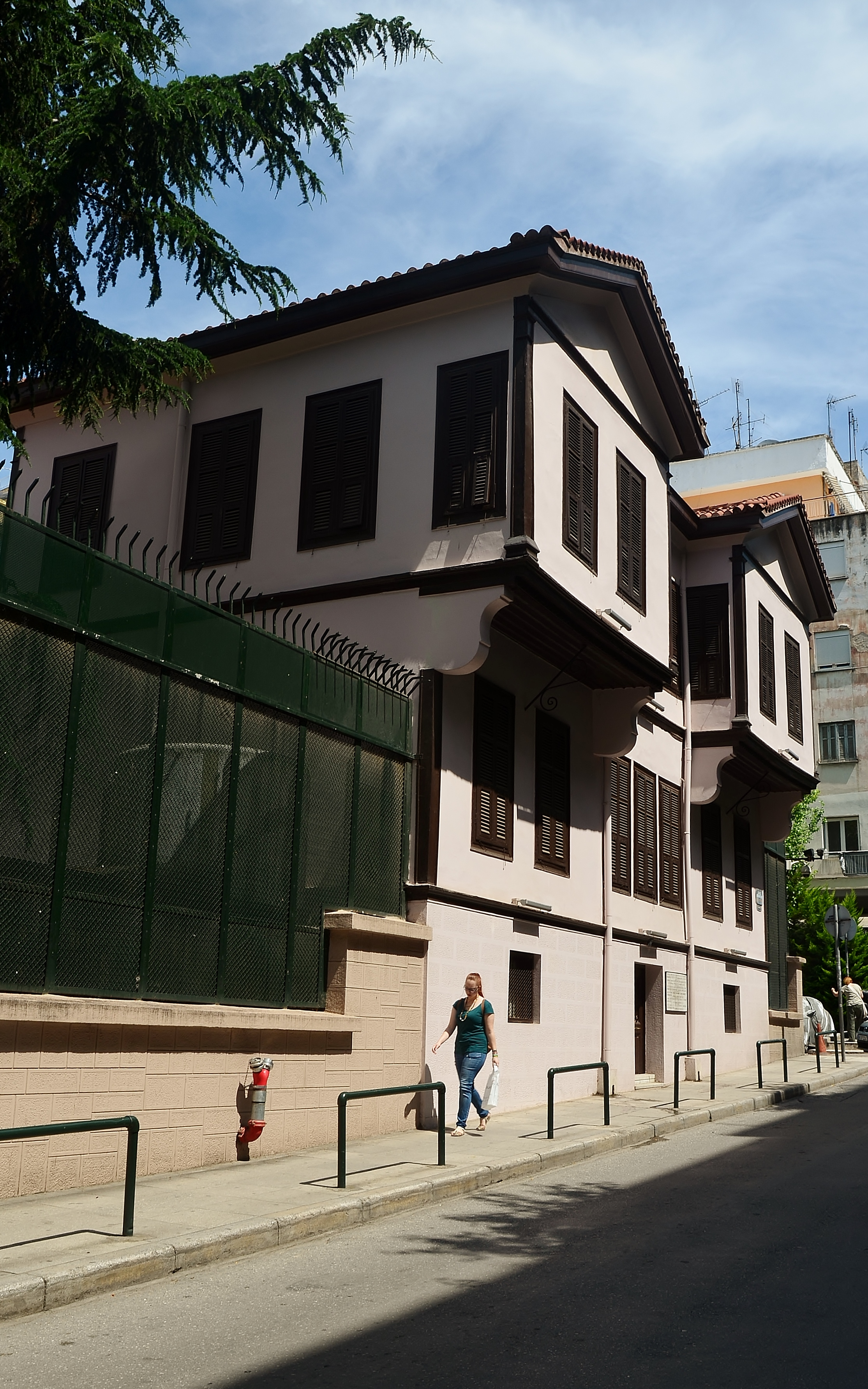
View from outside

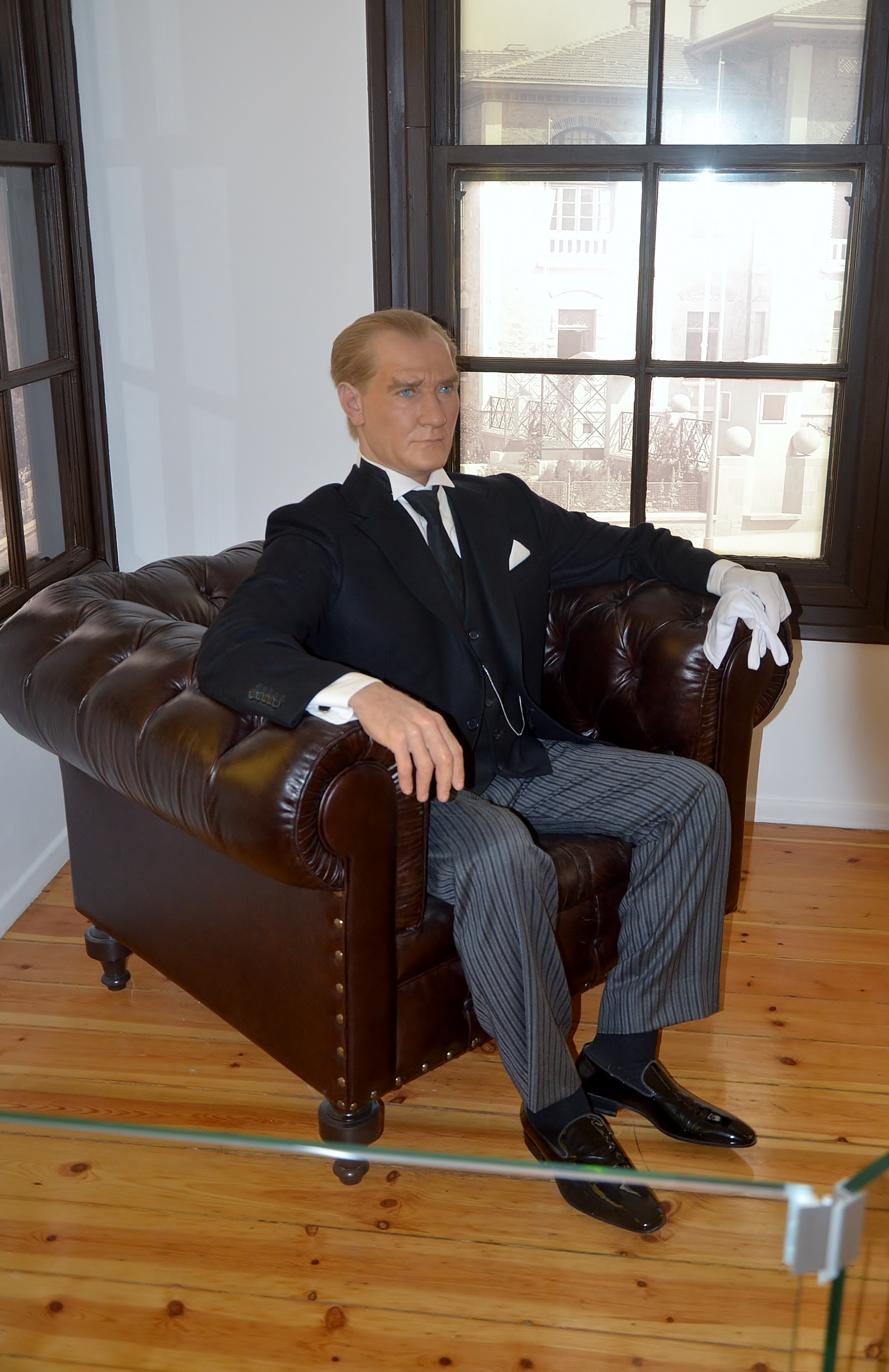
Wax sculpture

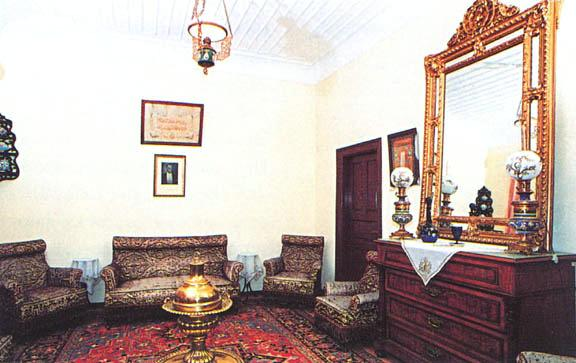
Living room

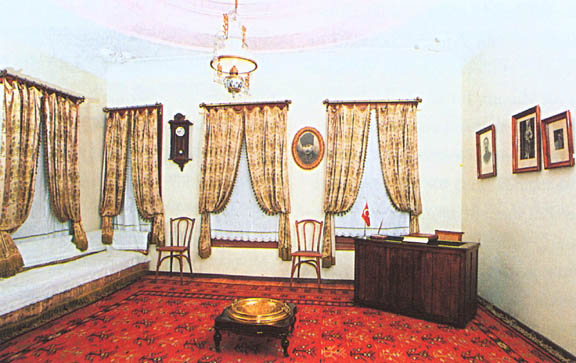
Atatürk's sleeping quarters

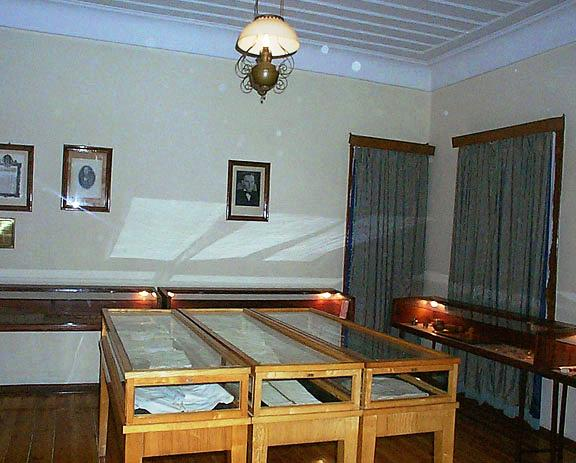
Atatürk's personal items
