= Şuhut =

- Municipality
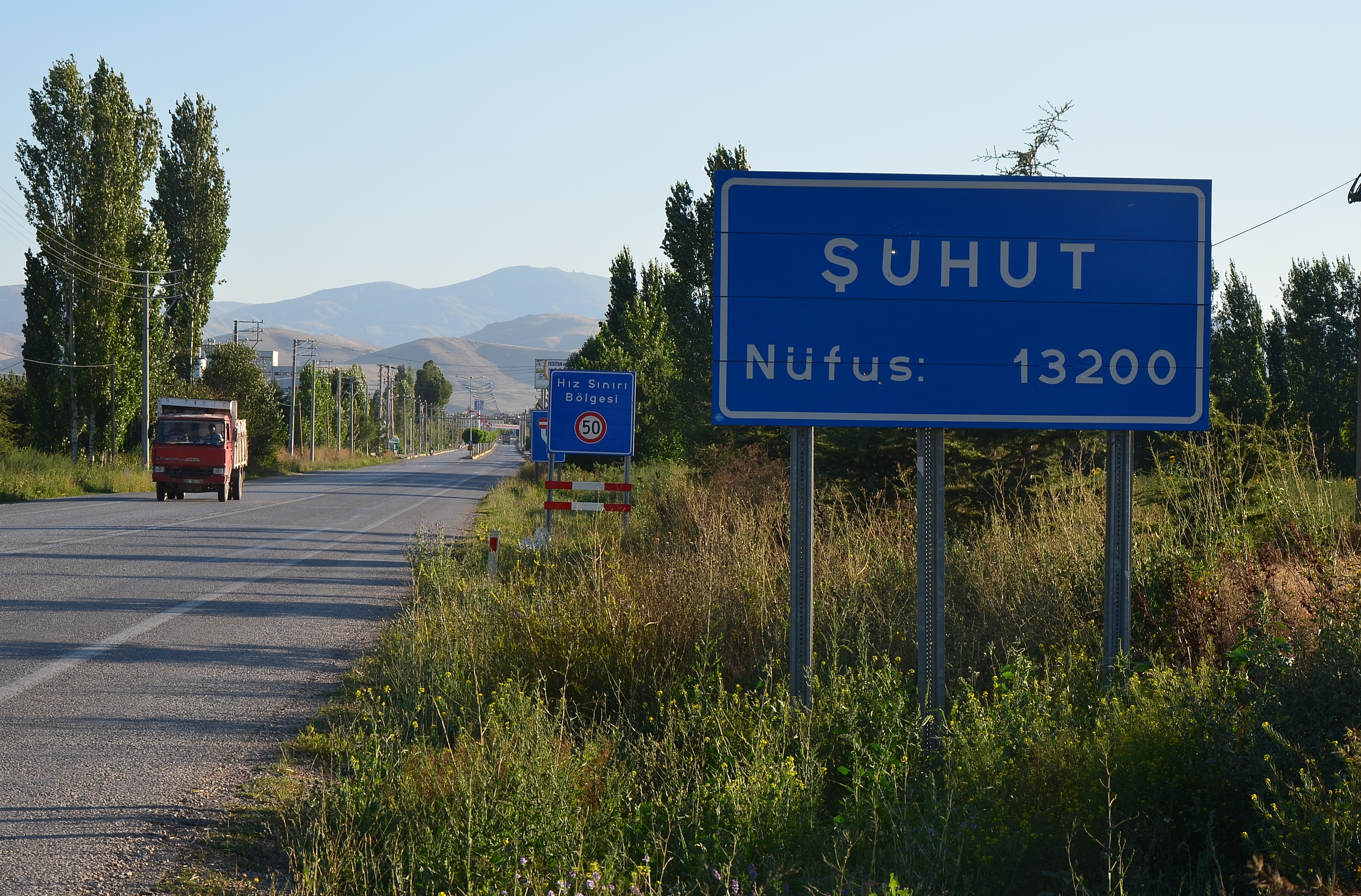
- City limit sign on the provincial road 03-26 from Afyonkarahisar.

- Location within Turkey Location within Turkey Aegean
- Coordinates: 38°32′N 30°33′E
- Country: Turkey
- Province: Afyonkarahisar
- District: Şuhut

Government
  - Mayor: Muhittin Özaşkın (MHP)
- Population (2024): 35,492
- Time zone: UTC+3 (TRT)
- Climate: Csb
- Website: www.suhut.bel.tr

Şuhut (Ottoman Turkish شهود Şuhūd; formerly Ancient Greek Σύνναδα Synnada) is a town in Afyonkarahisar Province in the Aegean region of Turkey. It is the seat of Şuhut District. Şuhut district has a total population of 35,492 according to the 2024 census. It lies in a small plain, 29 km east of the city of Afyon. The mayor is Muhittin Özaşkın (MHP).

== History ==
Excavations of a burial mound at Kepirtepe show the plain has been settled since the Neolithic period. The town was established during the Hittite period and grew under the Romans, by then it was known as Synnada. See Synnada for details on the area in antiquity and for the ecclesiastical history of the town in the Byzantine period.

== Today ==
Today Şuhut is a country town providing schools and other amenities to the surrounding rural area. Much of the land is used for raising beef cattle and growing wheat; Şuhut is famed for the quality of its meat and wheat stew, called keşkek. There is also a poultry industry and other crops, such as sugar beet, are grown. The younger generation are migrating to larger cities in search of careers.

== Places of interest ==
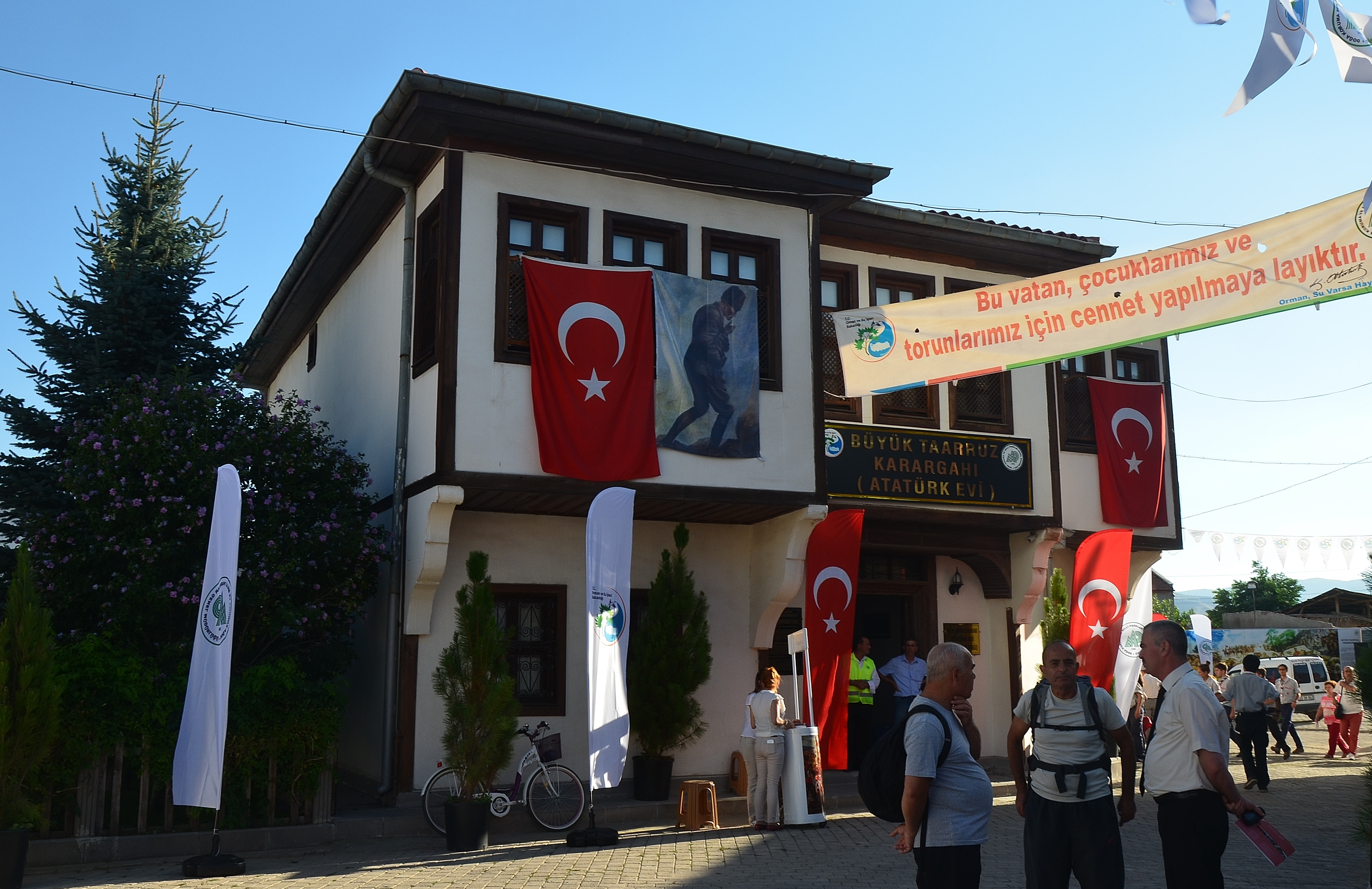
Atatürk's House

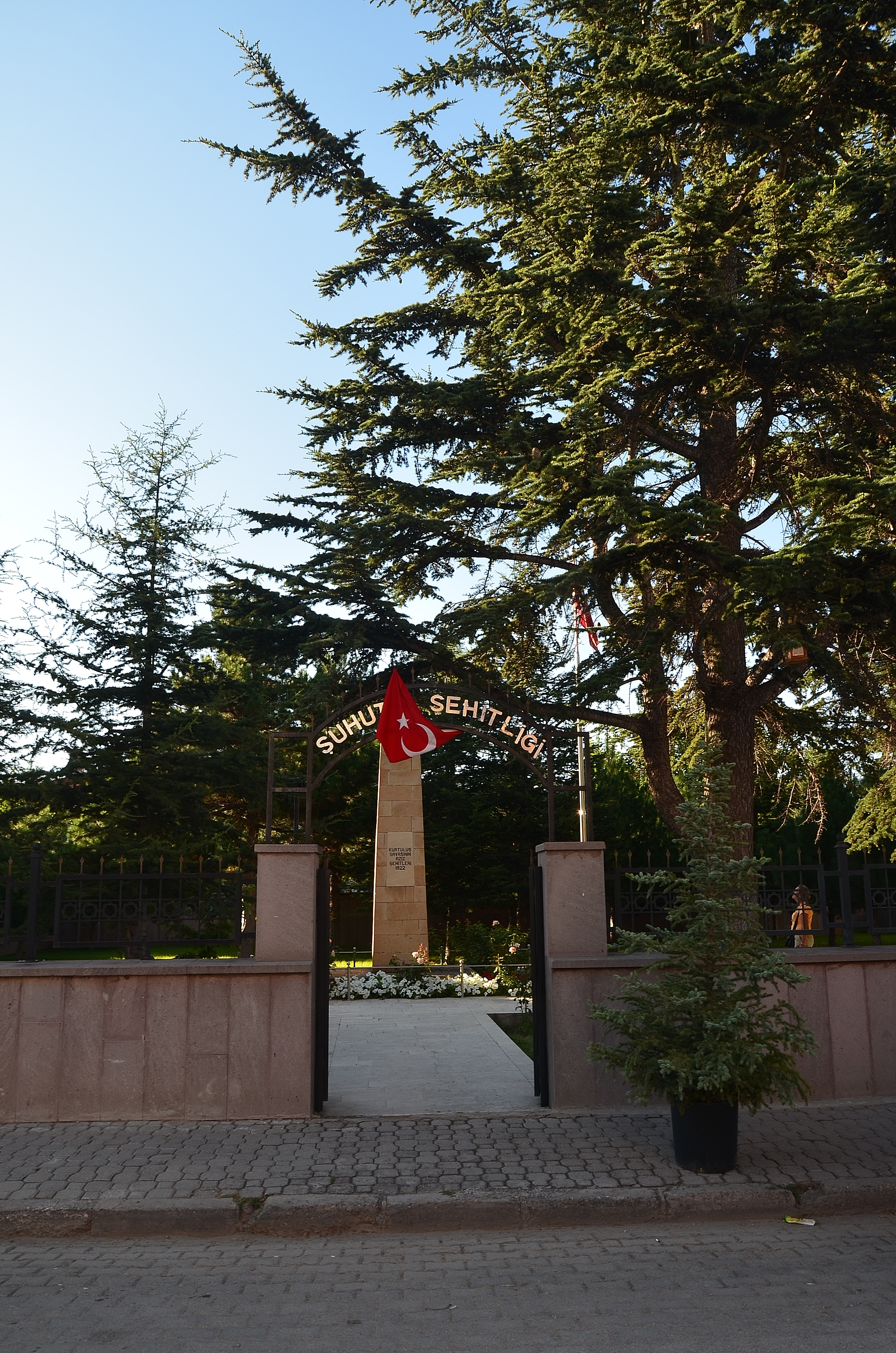
Şuhut Memorial Cemetery

- There are a number of Hittite burial mounds.
- The rock tombs of Bininler
- Asmakaya Castle
- Atatürk's House, aka Great Offensive Headquarters, a historic house museum, which was used as temporary headquarters by then Commander-in-Chief Mustafa Kemal Pasha (Atatürk) right before the Great Offensive in August 1922.
- Şuhut Memorial Cemetery in dedication to the Turkish soldiers killed in action during the Great Offensive in August 1922.

== Notable people ==
- Constantine the Jew (c. 850–after 886), Byzantine Christian monk, evangelist and Saint
- Veysel Eroğlu (born 1948), Turkish politician
