= Museums in Turkey =

Museums based in the Republic of Turkey

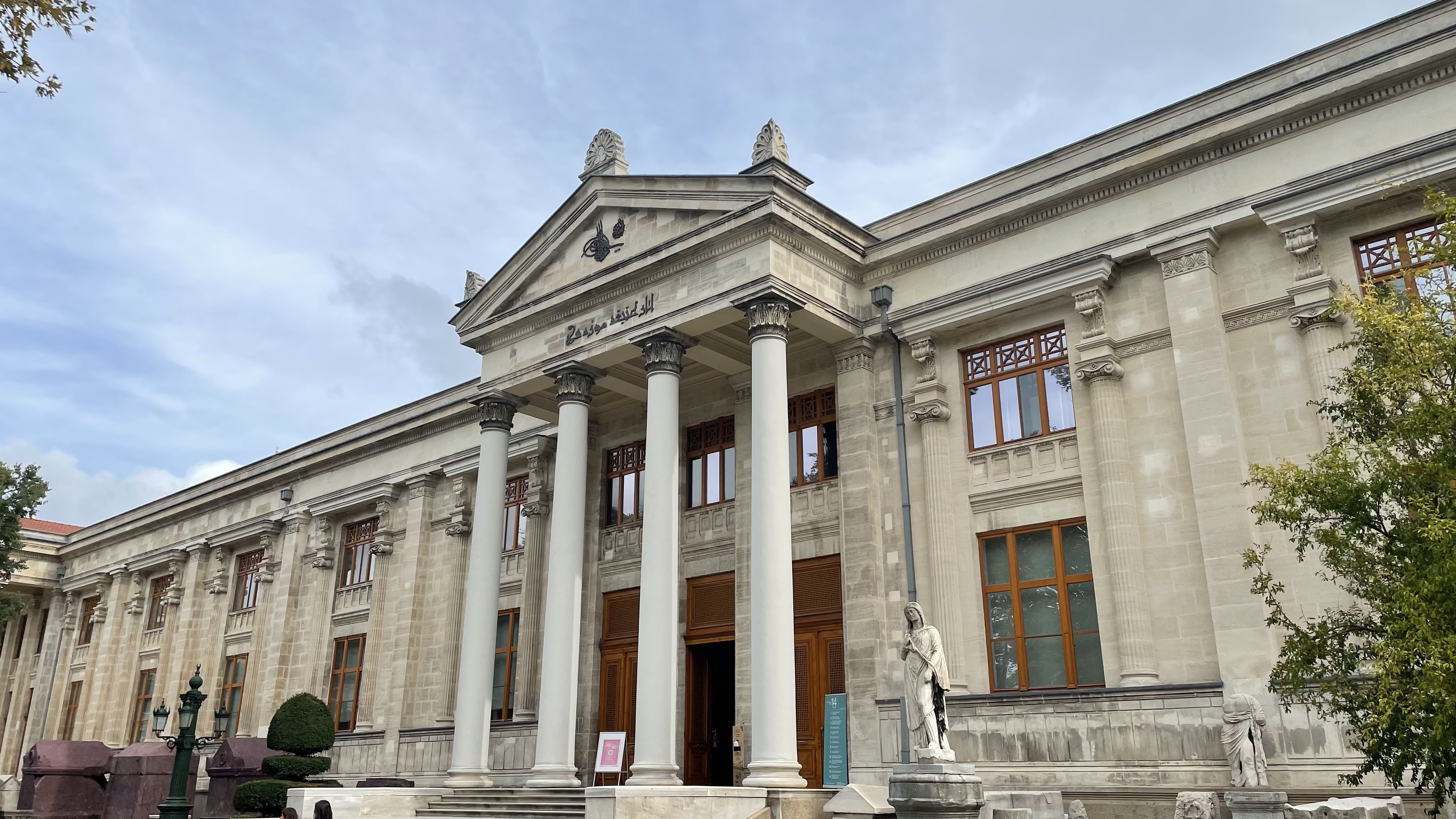
İstanbul Archaeology Museum

Following the proclamation of the Republic, Turkish museums developed considerably, mainly due to the importance Atatürk had attached to the research and exhibition of artifacts of Anatolia. When the Republic of Turkey was proclaimed, there were only the İstanbul Archaeology Museum called the "Asar-ı Atika Müzesi", the Istanbul Military Museum housed in the St. Irene Church, the Islamic Museum (Evkaf-ı Islamiye Müzesi) in the Suleymaniye Complex in Istanbul and the smaller museums of the Ottoman Empire Museum (Müze-i Humayun) in a few large cities of Anatolia.

The Turkish Archaeological Museum (Türk Asar-ı Atikası), which was established during the first years of the Republic, carried out studies to gather, collate, catalogue and protect archaeological and ethnographical finds. In many provinces of Anatolia, monumental buildings such as ancient churches, mosques and caravanserais were restored and converted into museums. Topkapı Palace, which was converted into a museum with the furniture and works of art on the premises, was opened to the public in 1927. The same year, the Islamic Museum was reorganized as the "Museum of Turkish and Islamic Works of Art" and the Mevlana Dervish Lodge in Konya was also converted into a museum.

The construction of the Ankara Ethnographical Museum, the first building designed as a museum, was completed in 1930. New museums were established in Bursa, Adana, Manisa, İzmir, Kayseri, Antalya, Afyon, Bergama, and Edirne. The Hittite Museum, which was established in the Mahmut Pasha Bedesten in Ankara in 1940, was restored and renovated and converted into "Museum of Anatolian Civilizations" in 1968.

Today, there are 99 museum directorates attached to the Ministry of Culture and Tourism, 151 private museums in 36 provinces and 1,204 private collections.

== List of museums ==
=== Adana ===
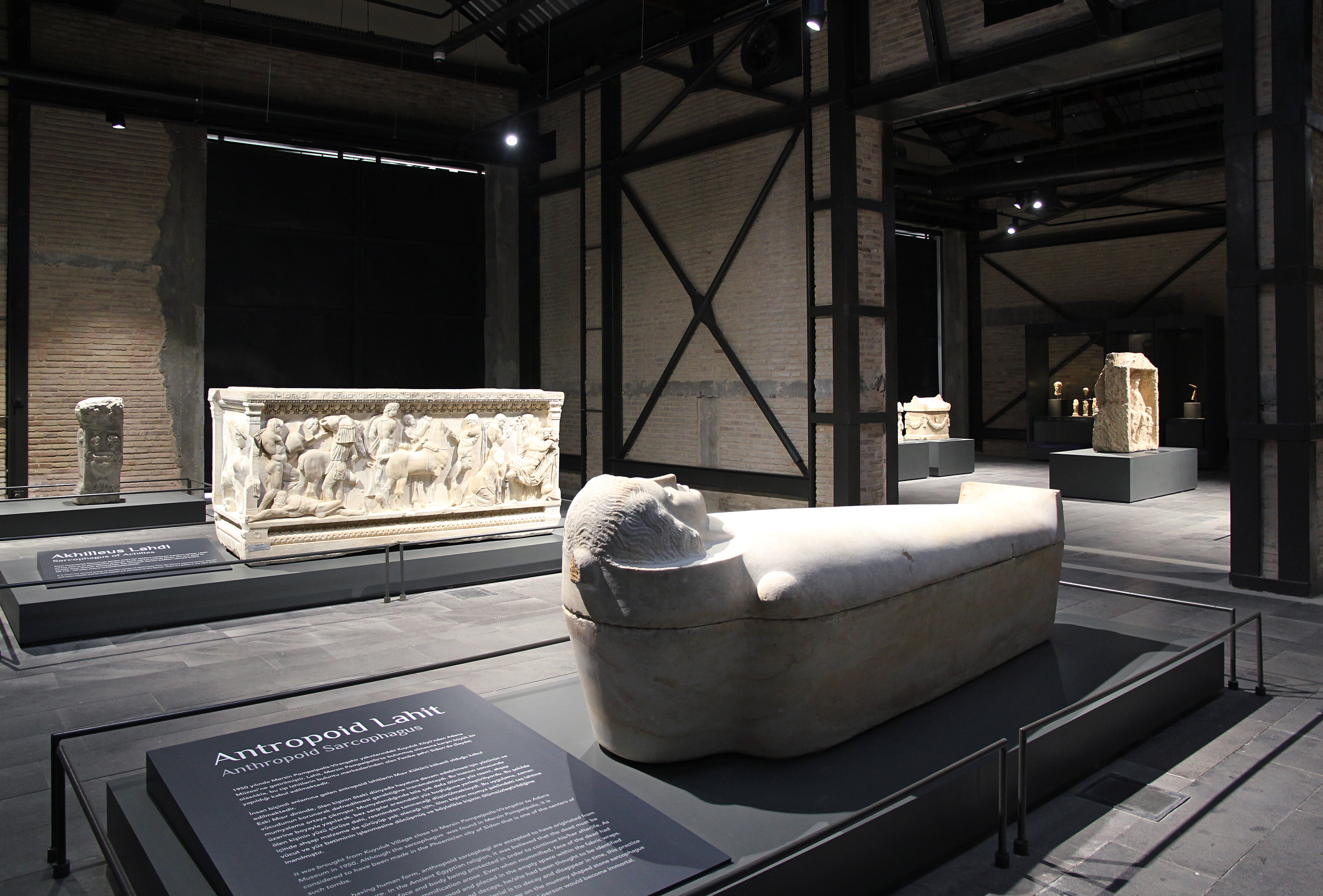
Adana Archaeological Museum

- Adana Archaeological Museum
- Adana Cinema Museum
- Adana Ethnography Museum
- Atatürk Museum
- Misis Mosaic Museum

=== Adıyaman ===
- Adıyaman Archaeological Museum

=== Afyonkarahisar ===
- Afyonkarahisar Archaeological Museum
- Victory Museum
- Atatürk's House (Şuhut)

=== Aksaray ===
- Aksaray Museum

=== Amasya Museum ===
- Amasya Museum

=== Ankara ===
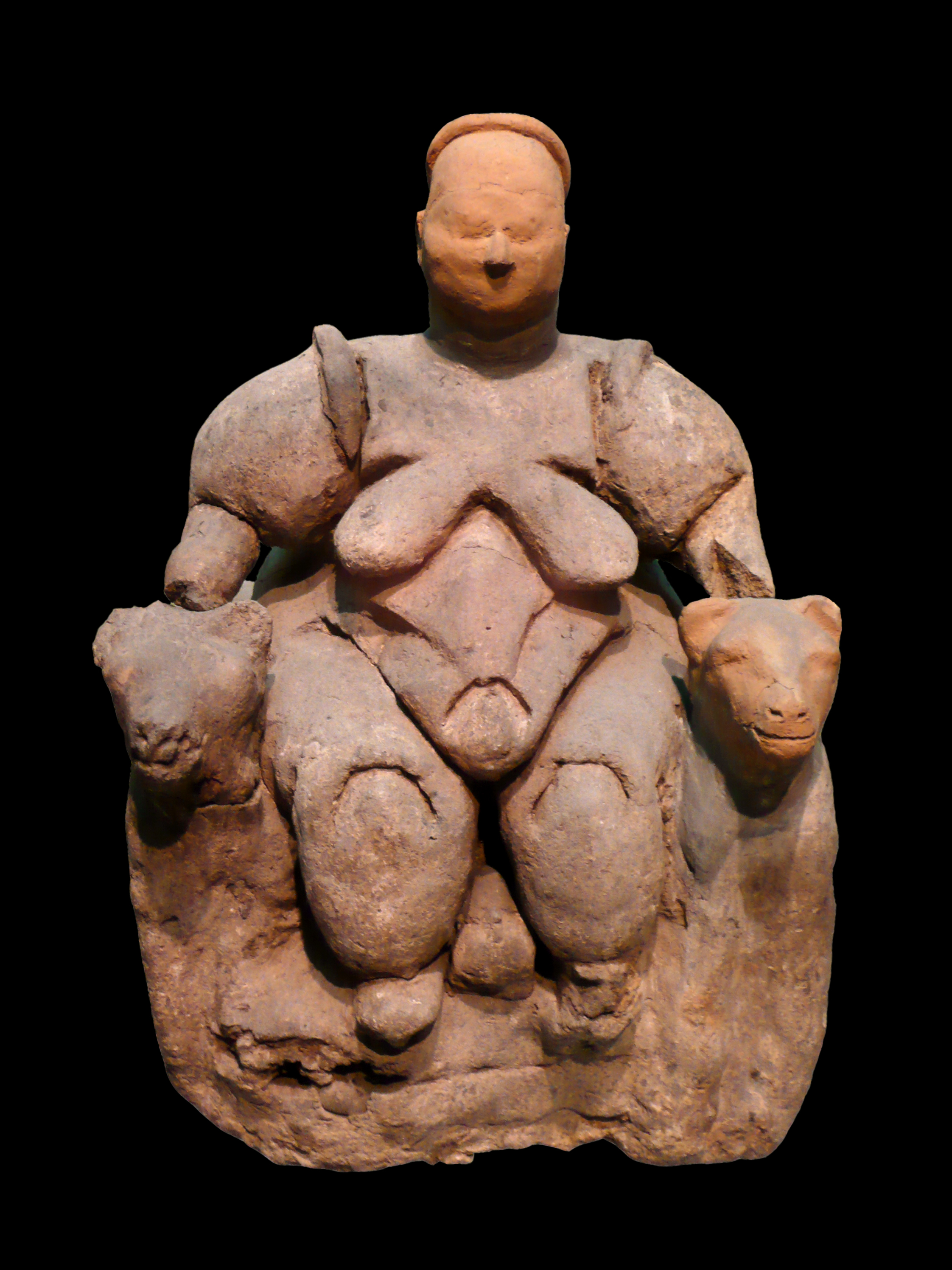
Seated Woman of Çatal Höyük: the head is a restoration, Museum of Anatolian Civilizations

- Anıtkabir
- Ankara Aviation Museum
- Erimtan Museum
- Ethnography Museum of Ankara
- Feza Gürsey Science Center
- Gordion Museum
- Gökyay Association Chess Museum
- İşbank Museum
- Kiosk Museum
- METU Science and Technology Museum
- Museum of Anatolian Civilizations
- Museum of Turkish Aeronautical Association
- Pembe Köşk
- Rahmi M.Koç Museum (Ankara)
- Republic Museum (Cumhuriyet Müzesi)
- Roman Baths of Ankara
- Stamp Museum
- State Art and Sculpture Museum
- TCDD Open Air Steam Locomotive Museum
- Ulucanlar Prison Museum
- War of Independence Museum
- Vakıf Museum

=== Antalya ===
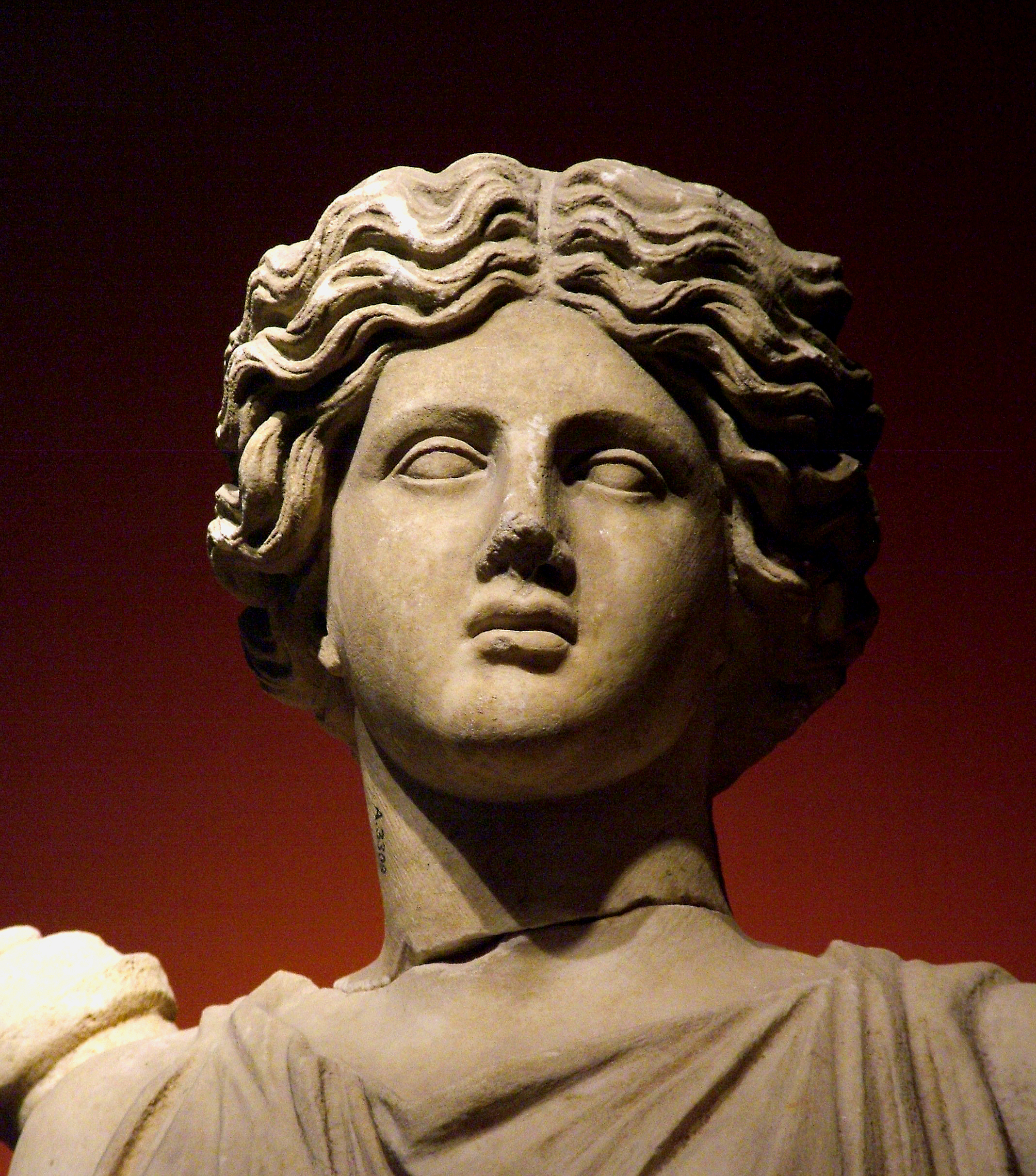
Greek female statue at Alanya Archaeological Museum

- Alanya Archaeological Museum
- Antalya Museum
- Atatürk's House Museum (Antalya)

=== Artvin ===
- Dikyamaç Museum

=== Aydın ===
- Aydın Archaeological Museum
- Fatma Suat Orhon Museum, Söke
- Kuşadası Necati Korkmaz Museum of Micro Miniatures
- Nazilli Museum of Ethnography

=== Balıkesir ===
- Balıkesir National Struggle Museum
- Burhaniye National Forces Culture Museum
- Tahtakuşlar Ethnography Museum

=== Bartın ===
- Amasra Museum

=== Batman ===
- Batman Museum
- Hasankeyf Cultural Park

=== Bayburt ===
- Baksı Museum

=== Bilecik ===
- Bilecik Museum
- Söğüt Ertuğrul Gazi Museum

=== Bolu ===
- Bolu Museum

=== Burdur ===
- Burdur Archaeological Museum

=== Bursa ===
- Bursa Archaeological Museum
- Bursa Atatürk Museum
- Bursa Energy Museum
- Bursa Forestry Museum
- Bursa Karagöz Museum
- Bursa Museum of Turkish and Islamic Art
- Iznik Çini Museum
- Iznik Museum
- Mudanya Armistice House

=== Çanakkale ===
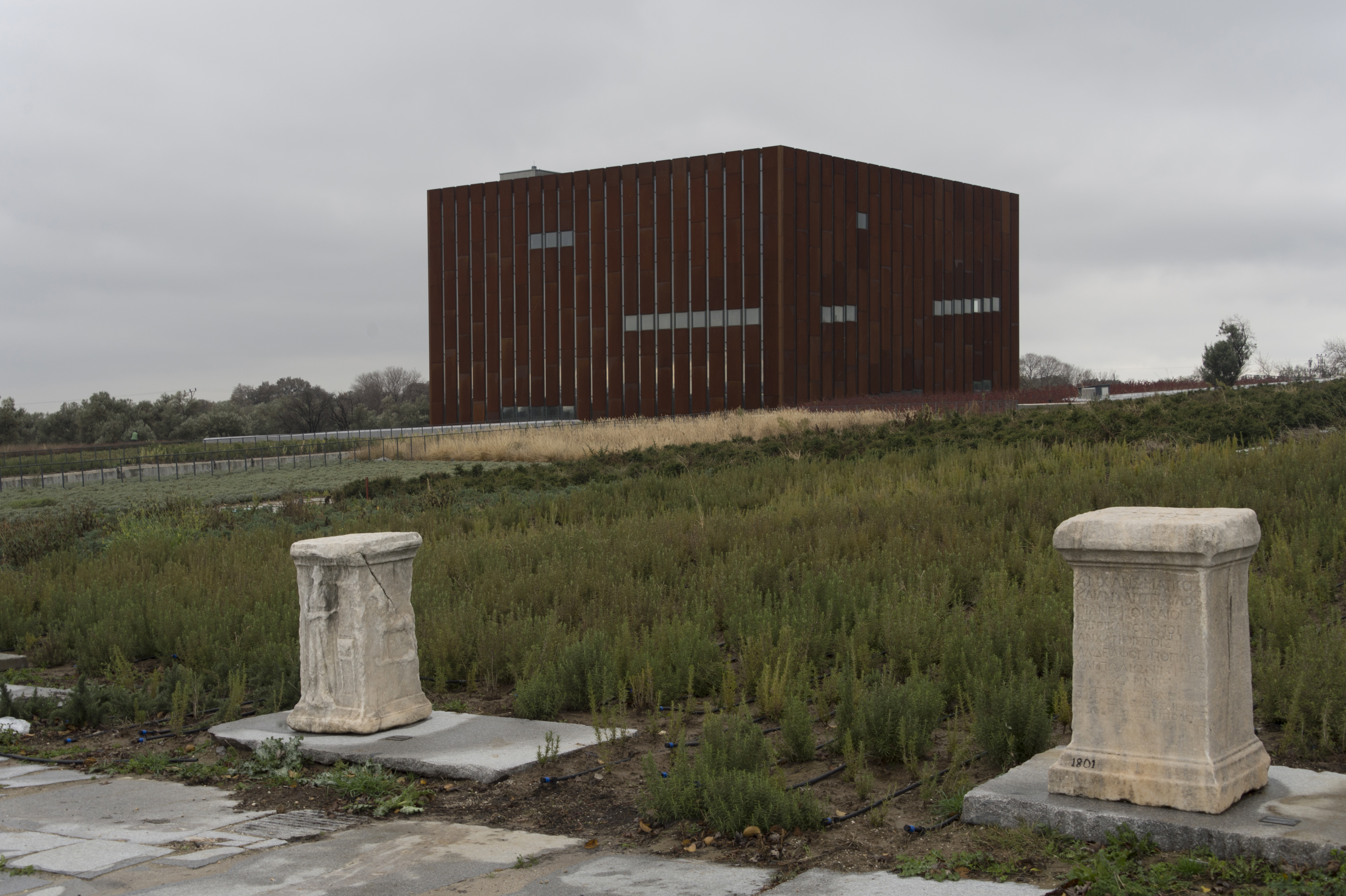
Troy Museum

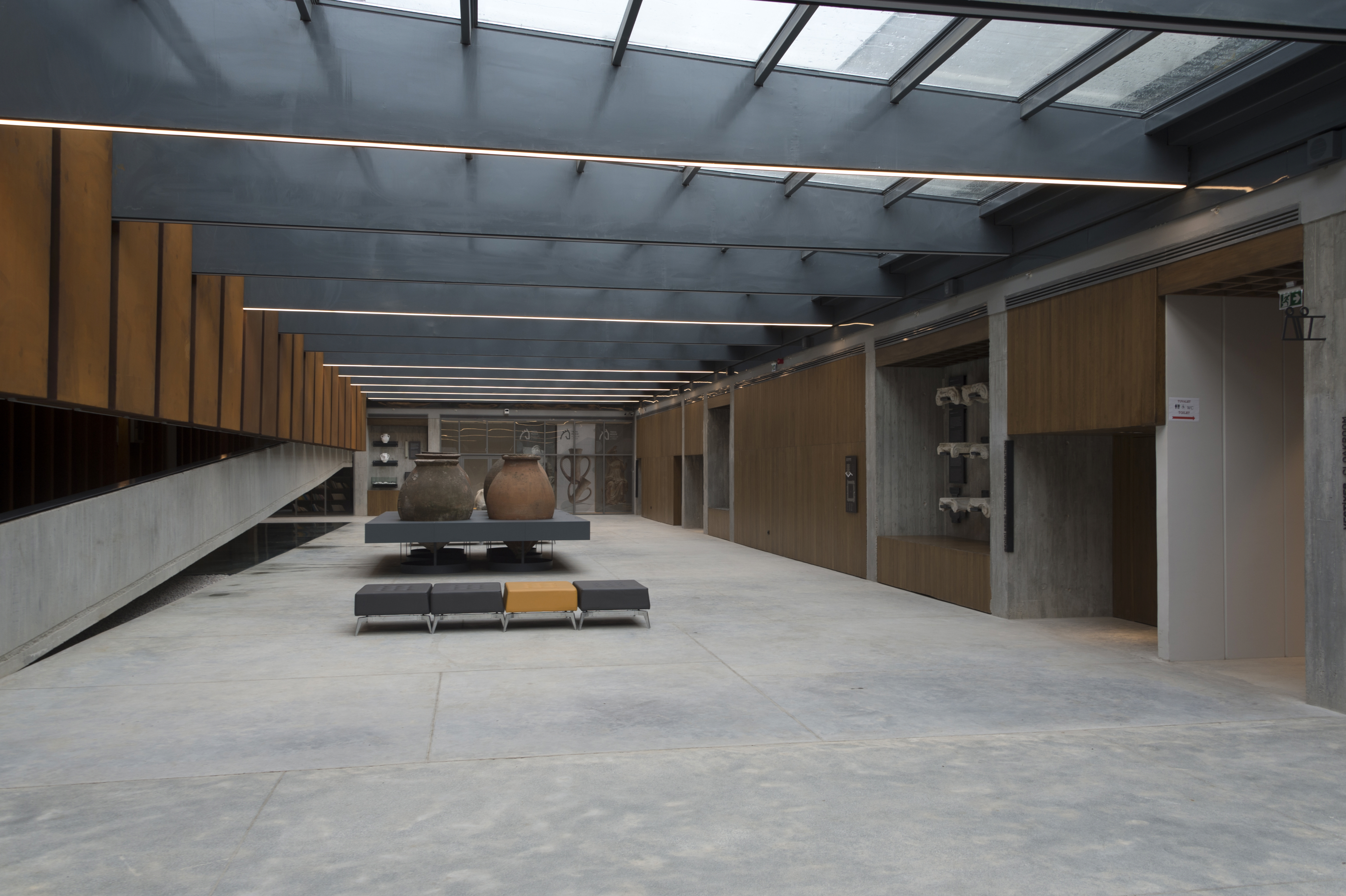
Interior of Troy Museum

- Adatepe Olive Oil Museum
- Archaeological Museum of Çanakkale
- Ceramics Museum of Çanakkale
- Troy Museum

=== Çankırı ===
- Çankırı Museum
- Ferit Akalın Radio and Communications Museum

=== Denizli ===
- Denizli Museum

=== Diyarbakır ===
- Ahmet Arif Literature Museum Library
- Cahit Sıtkı Tarancı Museum
- Diyarbakır Museum
- Ziya Gökalp Museum

=== Düzce ===
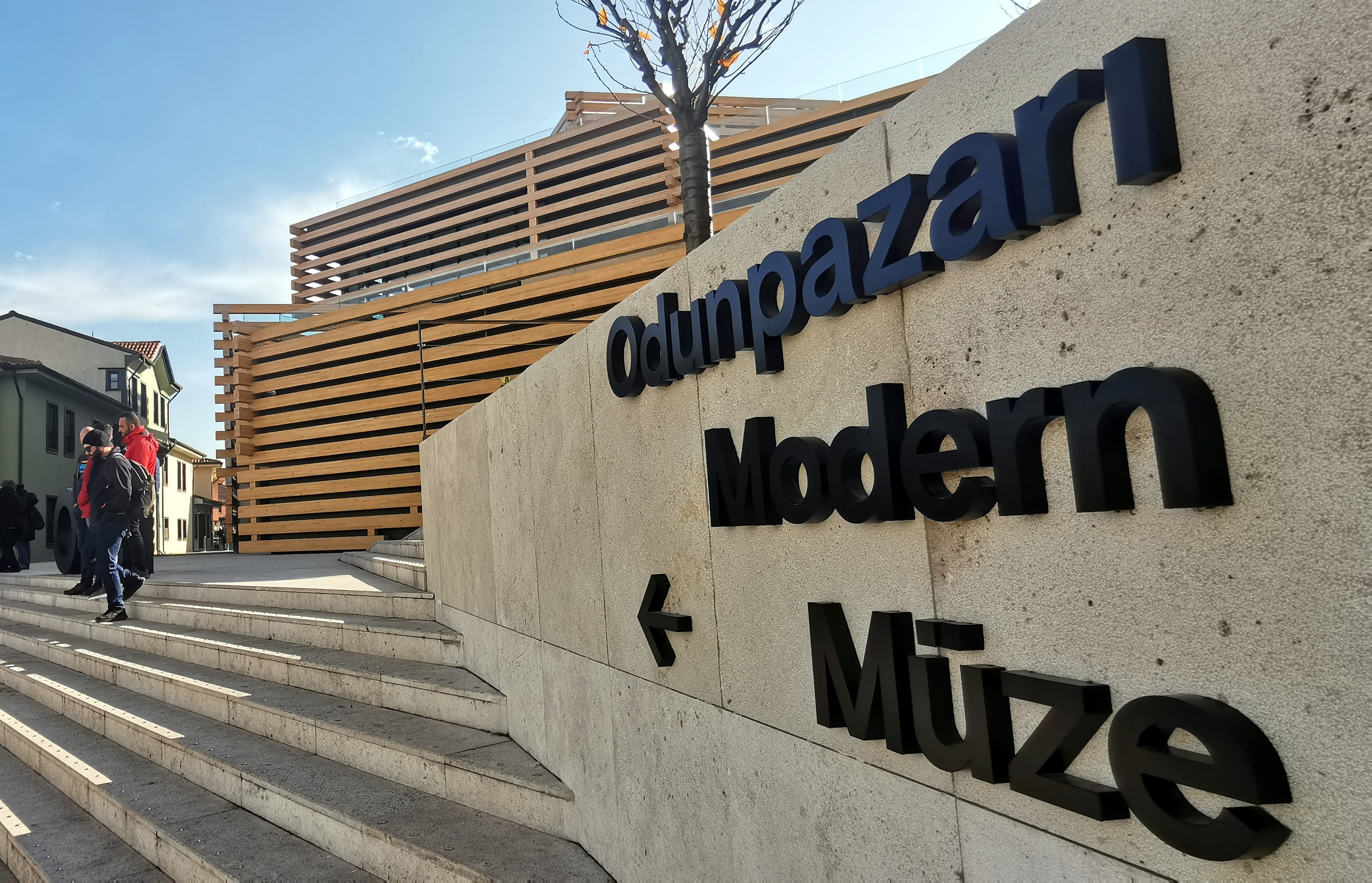
Odunpazarı Modern Arts Museum by the architect Kengo Kuma at Eskişehir

- Konuralp Museum

=== Edirne ===
- Edirne Museum

=== Elazığ ===
- Elazığ Archaeology and Ethnography Museum

=== Erzincan ===
- Ali Demirsoy Natural History Museum

=== Eskişehir ===
- Eskişehir Aviation Museum
- Eskişehir Caricature Museum
- Eskişehir Museum
- Eskişehir Meerschaum Museum
- Eskişehir Wax Museum
- İnönü Military Quarter and War Museum
- M.S.Ö. Air & Space Museum
- Museum of Independence, Eskişehir
- Museum of Modern Glass Art, Eskişehir
- Museum of woodworking
- Tülomsaş Museum

=== Gaziantep ===
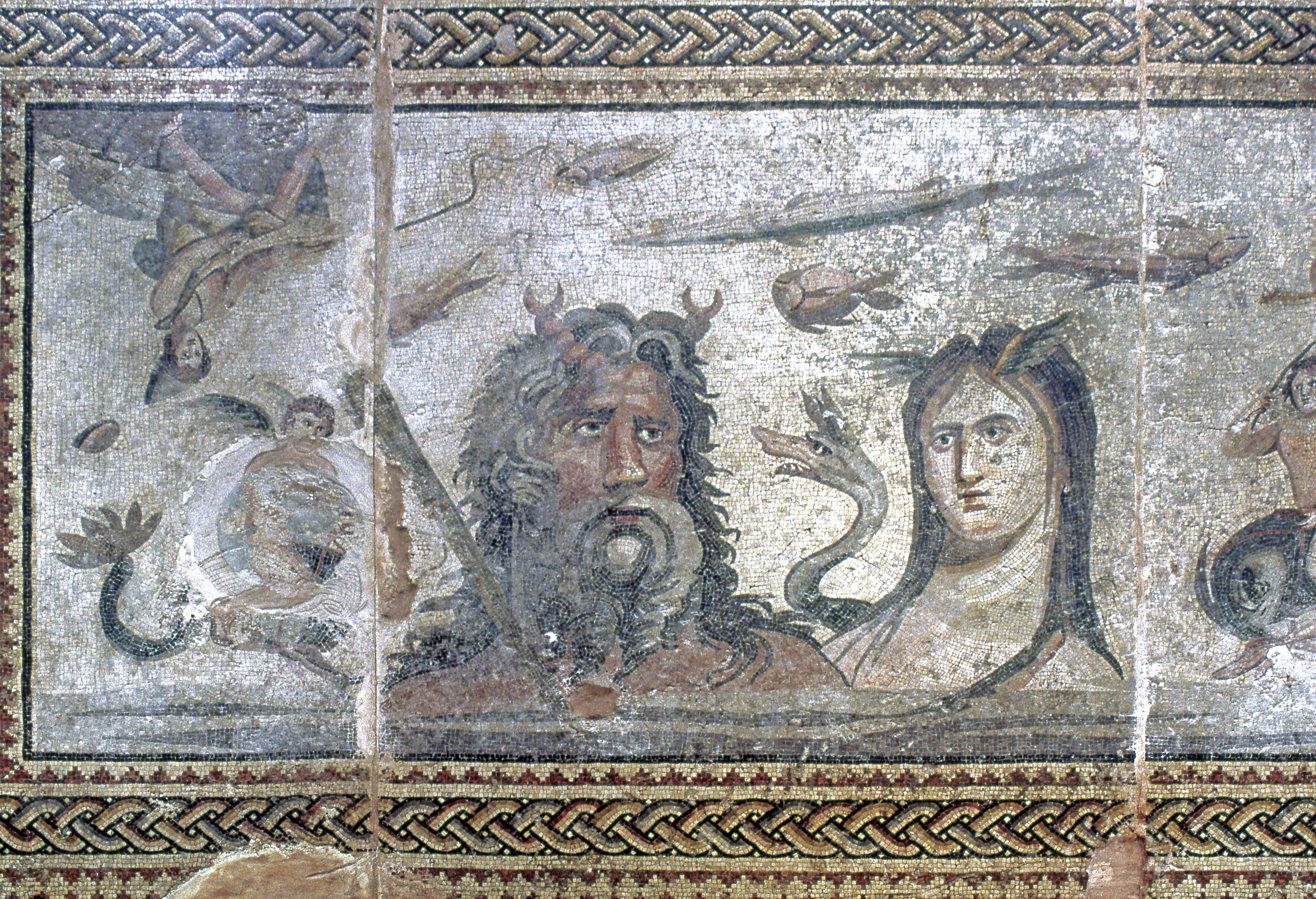
Zeugma Mosaic Museum

- Gaziantep Mevlevi Culture and Foundation Works Museums
- Gaziantep Museum of Archaeology
- Zeugma Mosaic Museum

=== Giresun ===
- Giresun Museum

=== Hatay ===
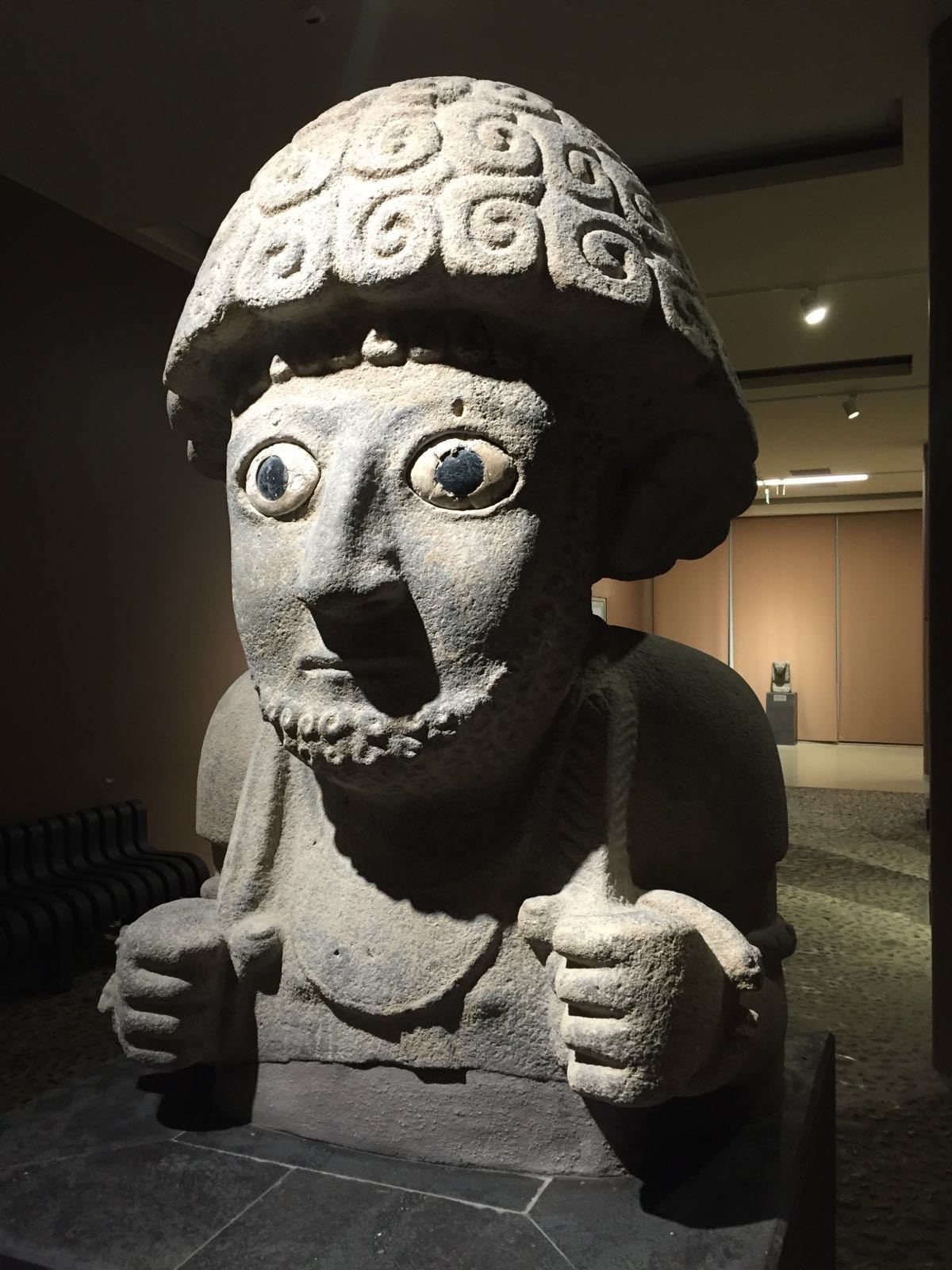
King Suppiluliuma

- Hatay Archaeology Museum
- İskenderun Naval Museum

=== Isparta ===
- Isparta Museum

=== Iğdır ===
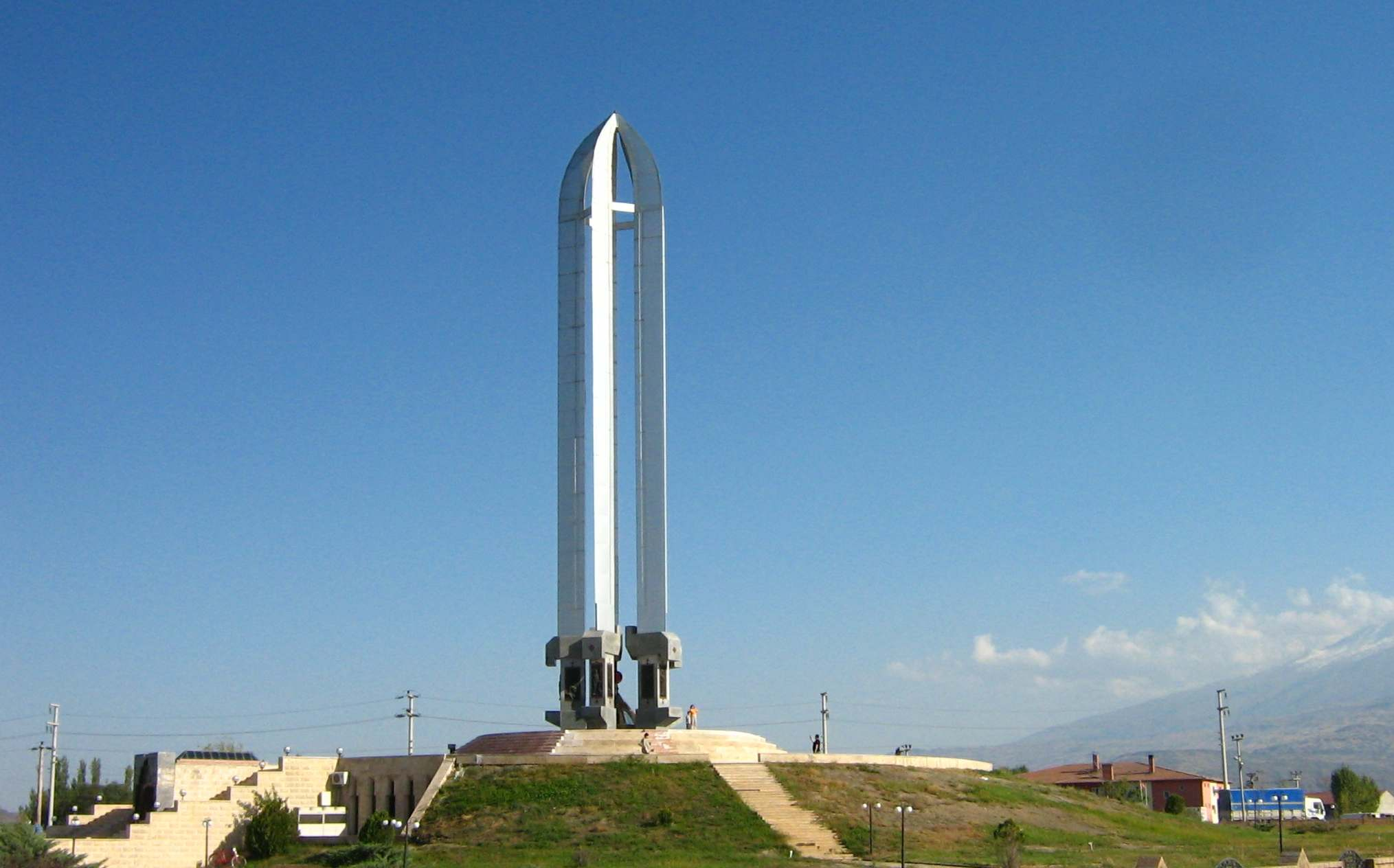
Iğdır Genocide Memorial and Museum

- Iğdır Genocide Memorial and Museum

=== İstanbul ===
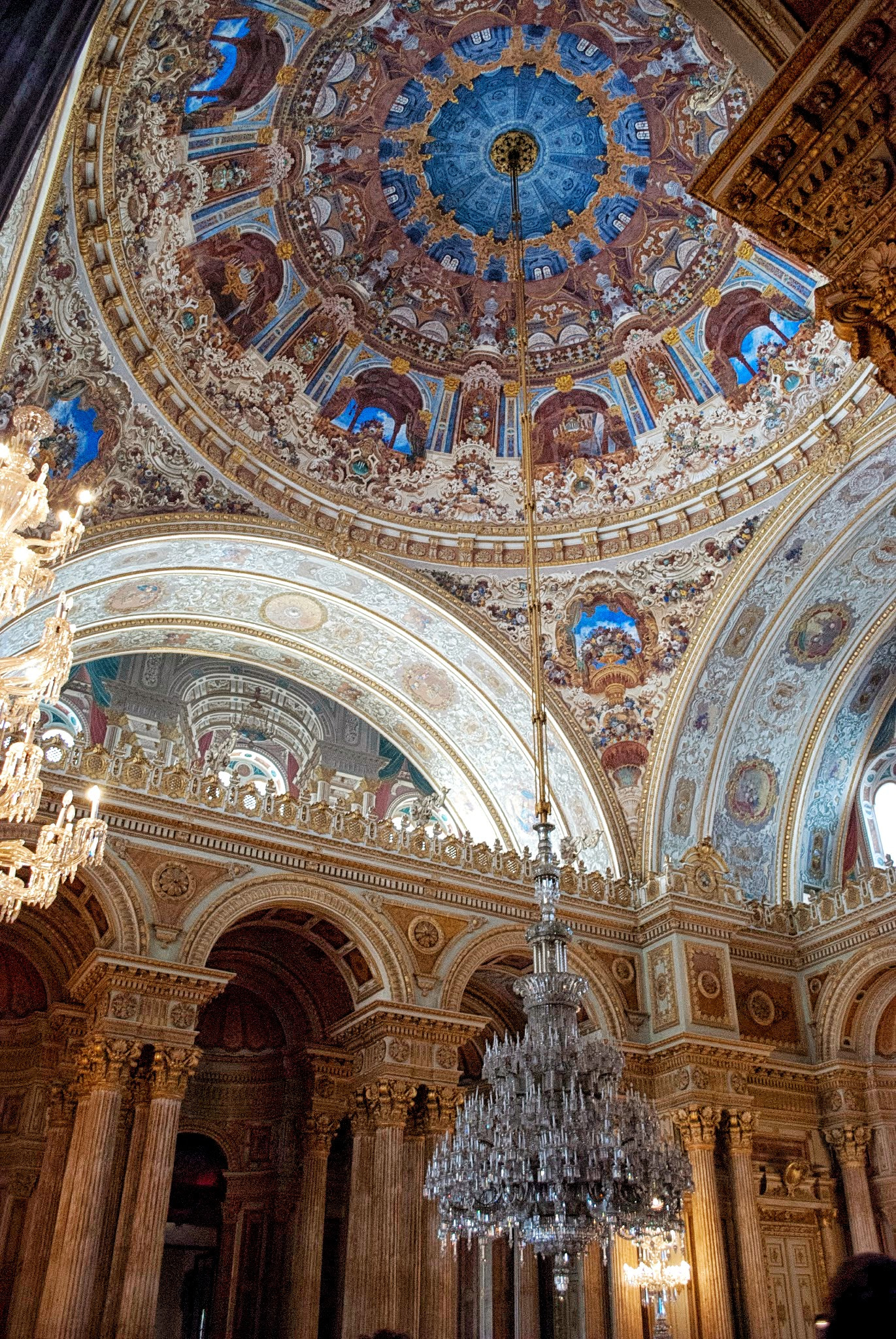
Ceremonial Hall at Dolmabahçe Palace, with the chandelier said to have been given by Queen Victoria

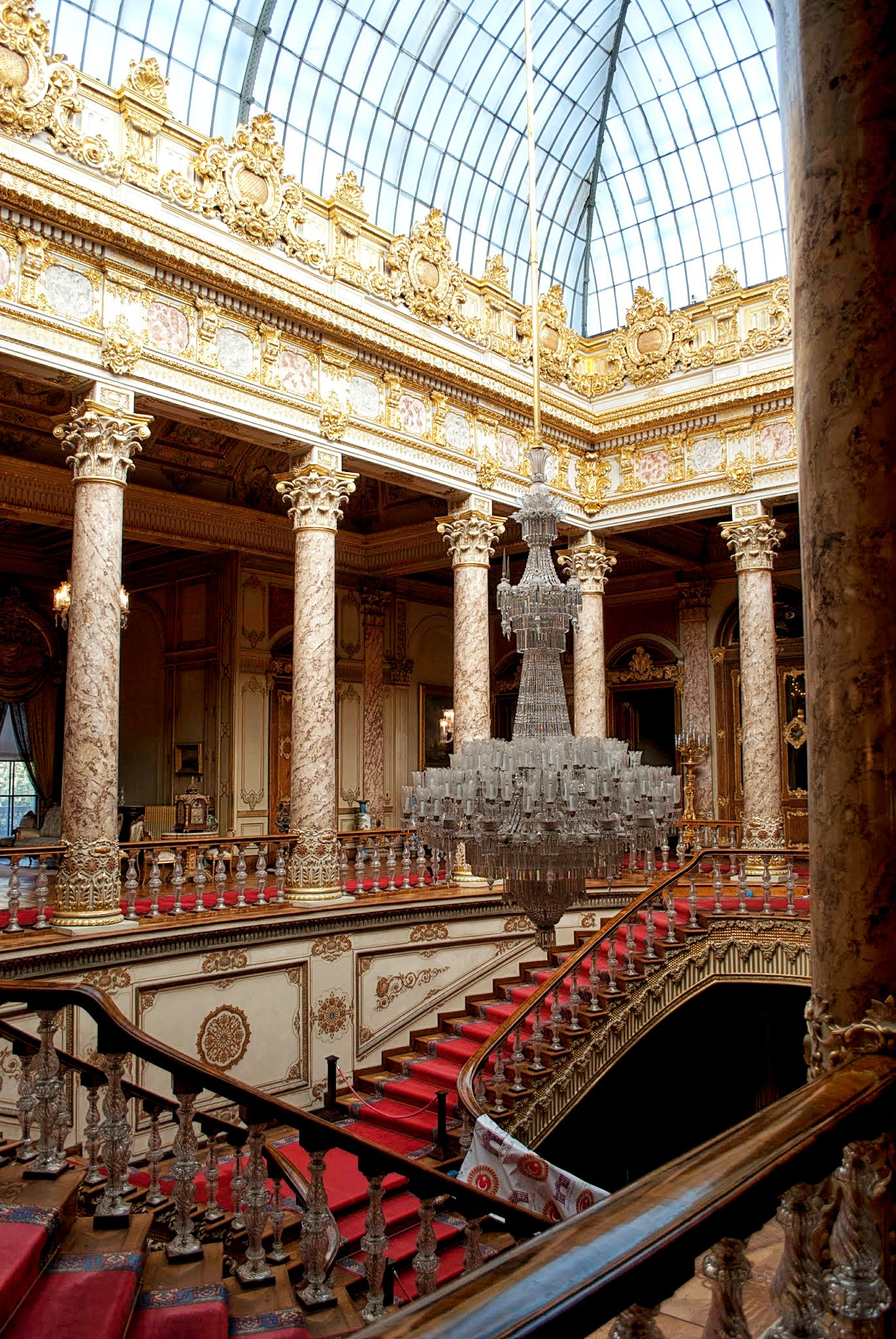
Crystal Staircase with Baccarat crystal banisters and chandelier at Dolmabahçe Palace

- Adalar Museum
- Adam Mickiewicz Museum, Istanbul
- Ahmet Arif Literature Museum Library
- Ahmet Hamdi Tanpınar Literature Museum Library
- Anadoluhisarı
- Aşiyan Museum
- Atatürk Museum
- Istanbul Aviation Museum
- Aynalıkavak Palace
- Beylerbeyi Palace
- Chora Church
- Doğançay Museum
- Dolmabahçe Palace
- Fenerbahçe Museum
- Galatasaray Museum
- Great Palace Mosaic Museum
- Hagia Sophia
- Ihlamur Palace
- Istanbul Archaeology Museums
- Istanbul Contemporary Art Museum
- Istanbul Modern
- Istanbul Naval Museum
- Istanbul Railway Museum
- İstanbul State Art and Sculpture Museum
- İstanbul Toy Museum
- Istanbul UFO Museum
- Istanbul Zoology Museum
- Işbank Museum
- Jewish Museum of Turkey
- Kandilli Earthquake Museum
- Küçüksu Palace
- Madame Tussauds Istanbul
- Maslak Palace
- Mehmet Akif Literature Museum Library
- Natural History Museum of İhsan Ketin
- Istanbul Military Museum
- Museum of Illumination and Heating Appliances
- Pammakaristos Church
- Pera Museum
- Platform Garanti Contemporary Art Center
- Proje4L / Elgiz Museum of Contemporary Art
- Rahmi M. Koç Museum
- Rezan Has Museum
- Rumelihisarı
- Sadberk Hanım Museum
- Sait Faik Abasıyanık Museum
- Sakıp Sabancı Museum
- SantralIstanbul Energy Museum
- SantralIstanbul
- The Museum of Innocence
- Topkapı Palace
- Turkish and Islamic Arts Museum
- Women's Museum İstanbul
- Yıldız Palace

=== İzmir ===
- Ahmed Adnan Saygun Arts Center
- Avrasya Anı Evi (Eurasia Memorial House)
- Bergama Museum
- Çamlık Railway Museum
- Çeşme Museum
- Natural History Museum of Ege University
- İzmir Archaeological Museum
- İzmir Atatürk Museum
- İnciraltı Sea Museum
- İzmir Art and Sculpture Museum
- İzmir Ethnography Museum
- İzmir Toy Museum
- Ödemiş Museum
- Tire City Museum

=== Kahramanmaraş ===
- Kahramanmaraş Archaeology Museum
- Kahramanmaraş Liberation Museum

=== Karaman ===
- Karaman Museum

=== Karabük ===
- Karabük Kardemir Iron-Steel Museum

=== Kars ===
- Boğatepe Cheese Museum
- Kars Museum

=== Kastamonu ===
- Kastamonu Ethnography Museum

=== Kayseri ===
- Kayseri Archaeology Museum

=== Kırıkkale ===
- Kırıkkale MKE Weapons Industry Museum

=== Kırşehir ===
- Kırşehir Museum

=== Kilis ===
- Kilis Museum

=== Kocaeli ===
- Kocaeli Museum
- SEKA Paper Museum
- Osman Hamdi Bey Museum

=== Konya ===
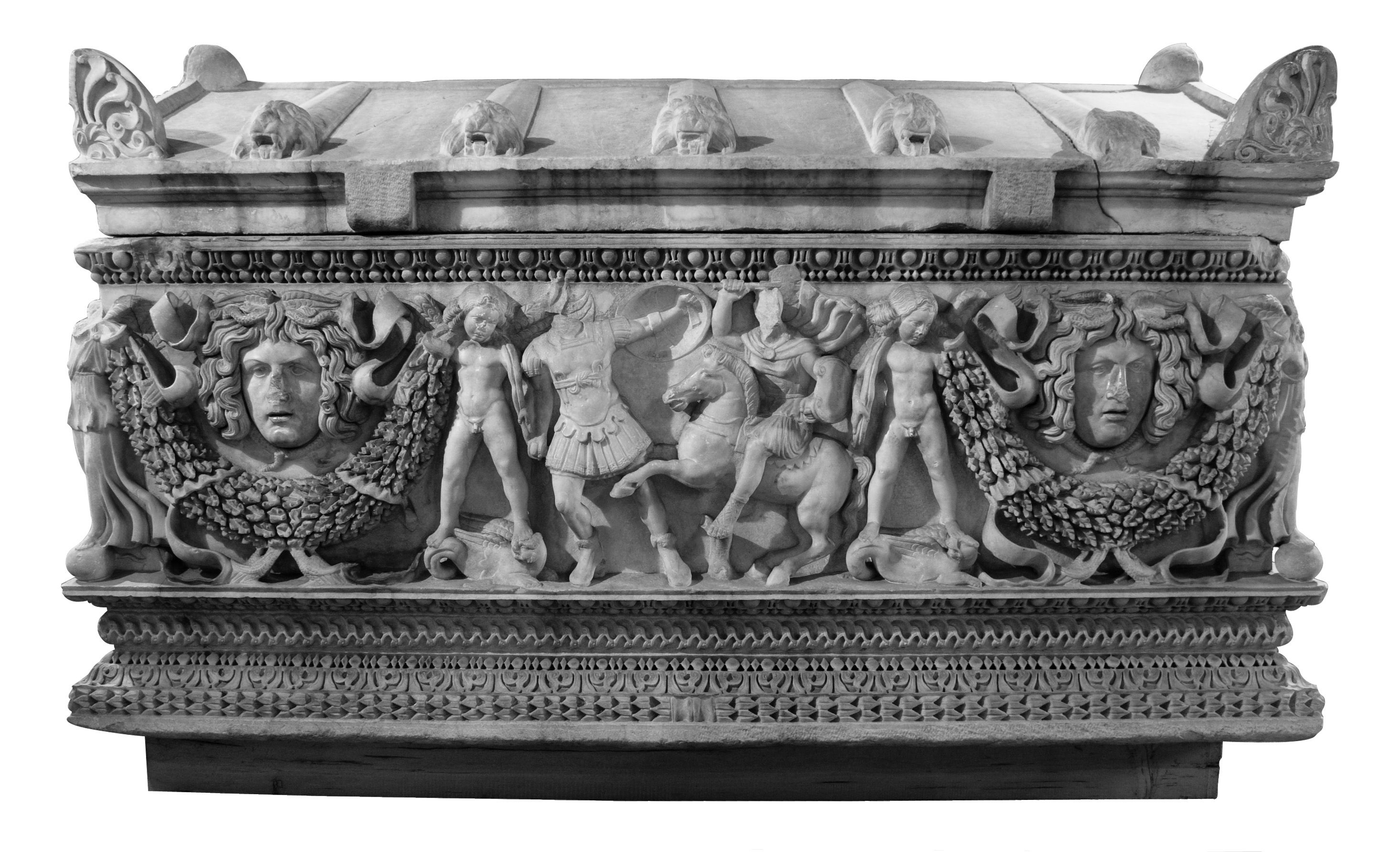
Marble Sarcophagus, typical of Pamphylia. Roman period III century AD at the Konya Archaeological Museum

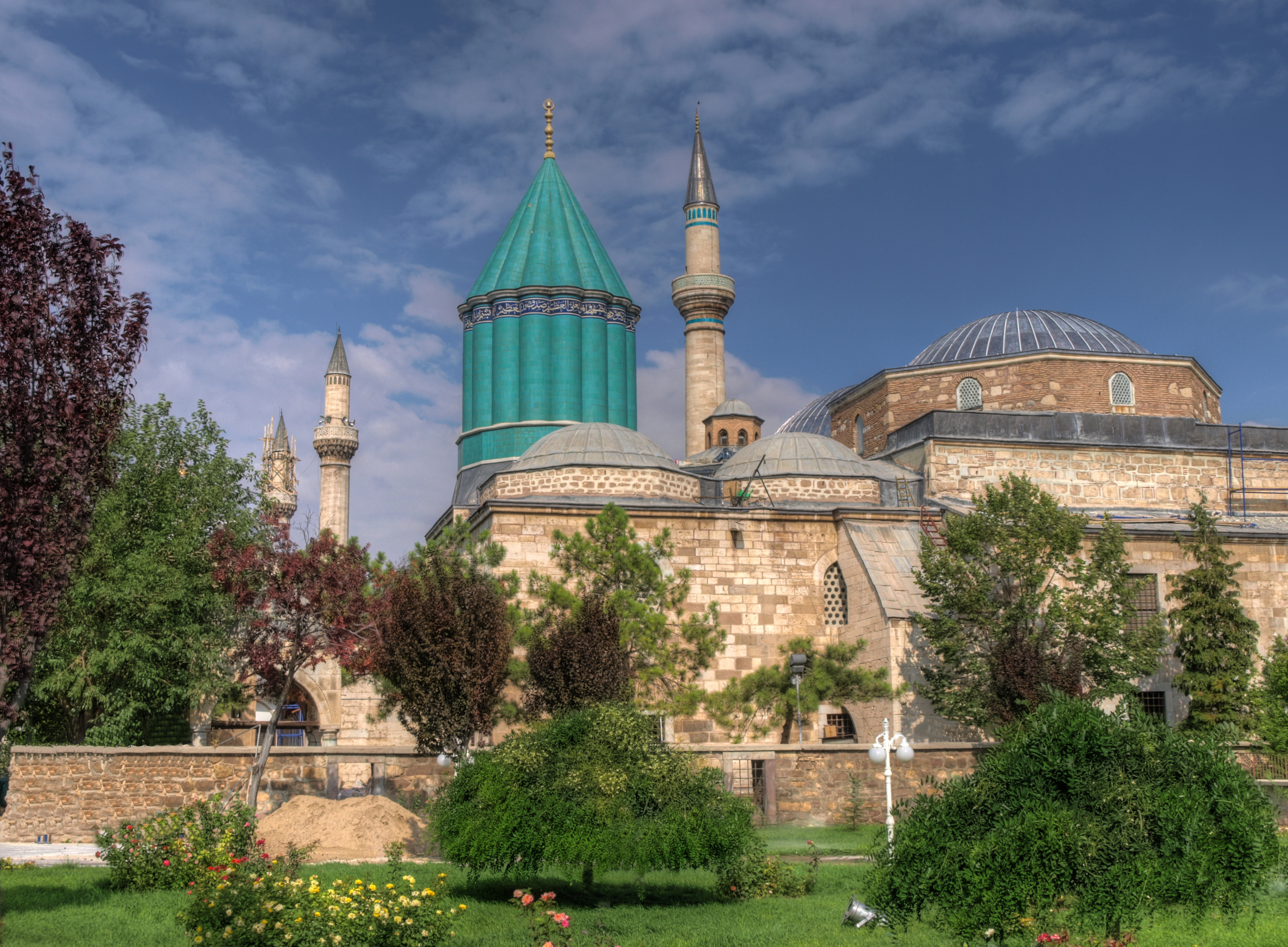
Mevlana Museum (1274) is the resting place of the Sufi mystic and poet Rumi in Konya, the capital of the Anatolian Seljuk Sultanate.

- Akşehir Museum
- Ereğli Museum
- Konya Archaeological Museum
- Konya Ethnography Museum
- Mevlana Museum
- Sahip Ata Museum

=== Kütahya ===
- Kütahya Archaeological Museum

=== Malatya ===
- Camera Museum
- Malatya Museum

=== Manisa ===
- Akhisar Museum
- Manisa Archaeological Museum

=== Mardin ===
- Mardin Museum
- Midyat Filigree Museum

=== Mersin ===
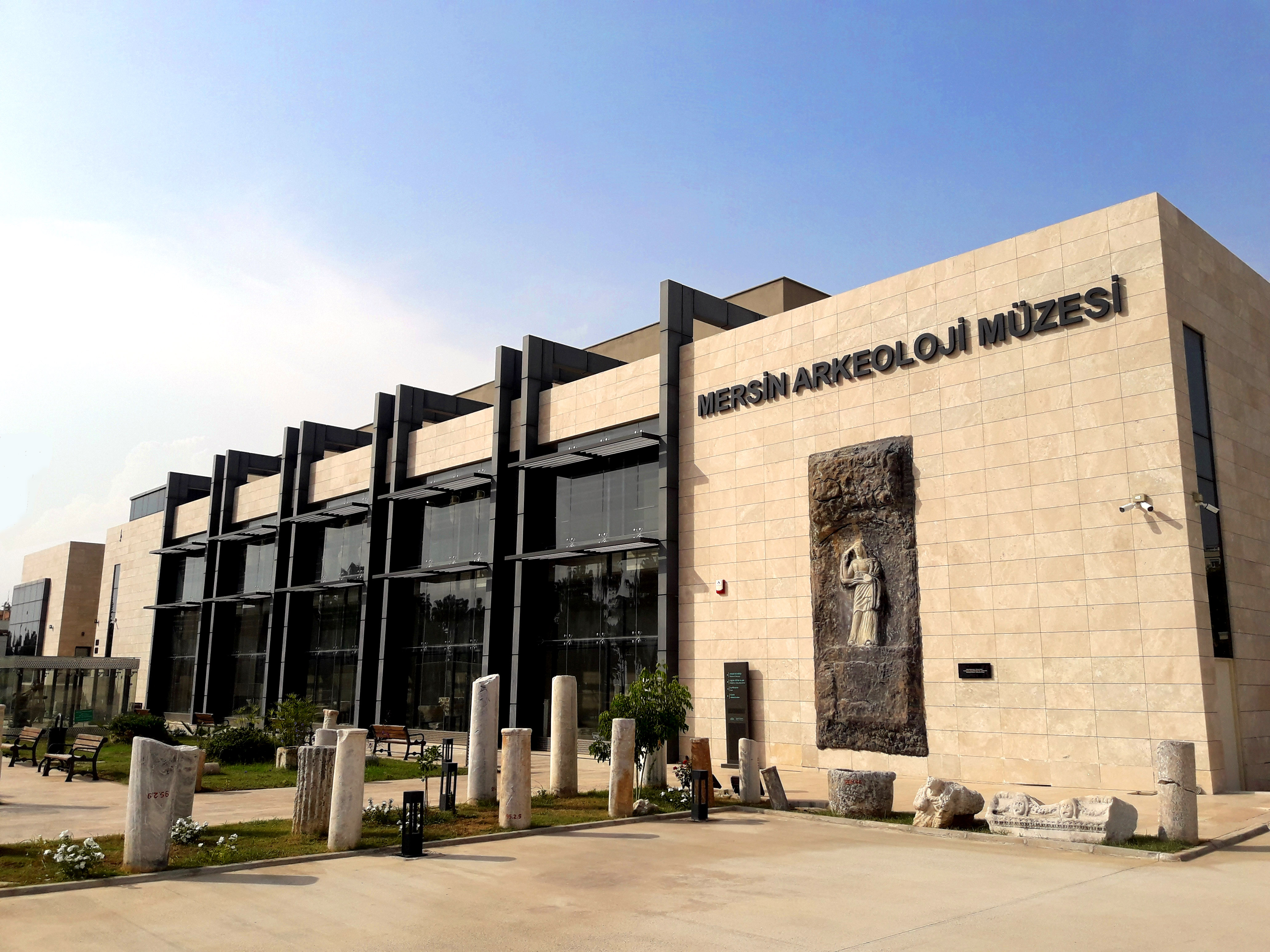
Mersin Archaeological Museum

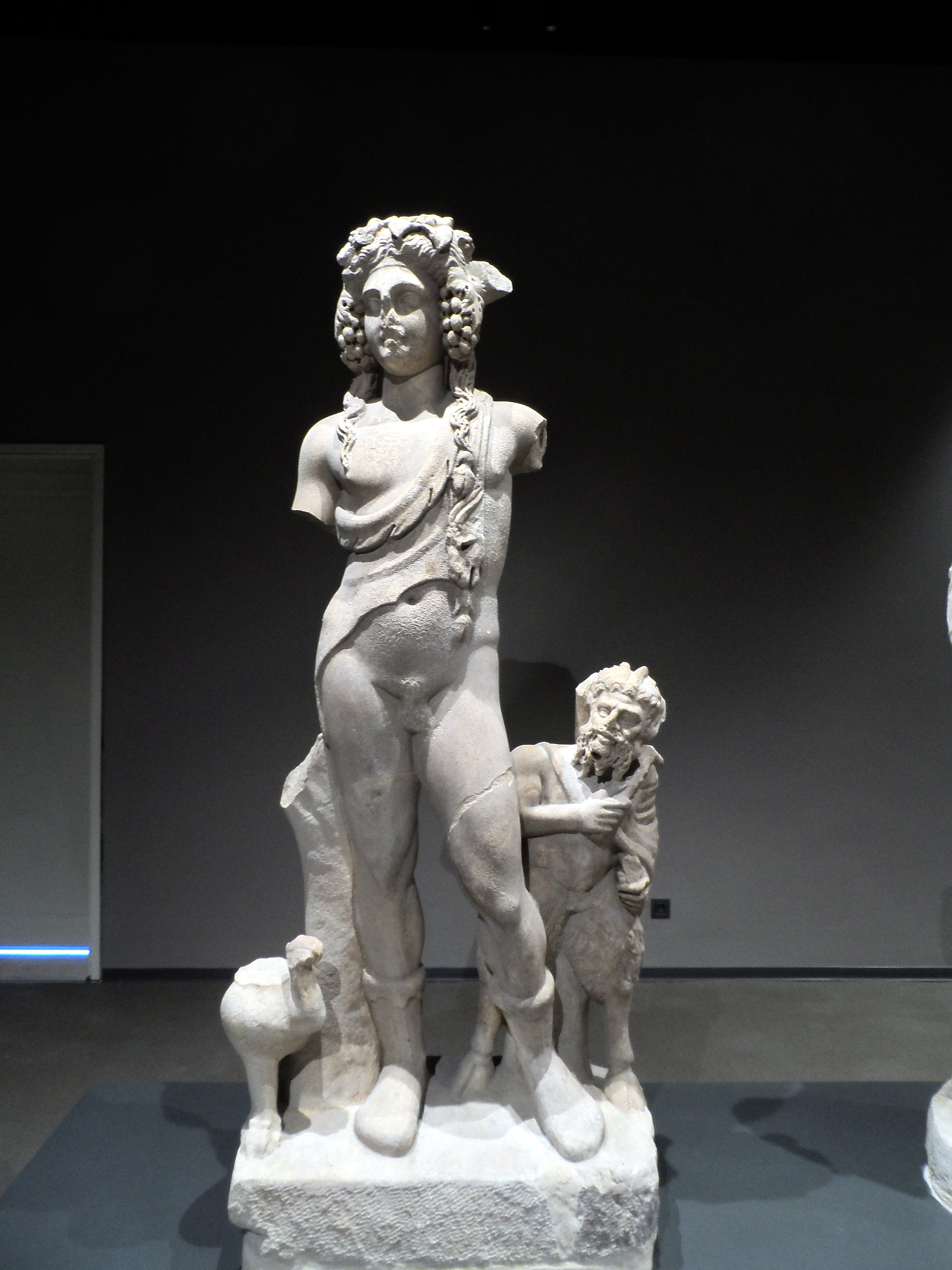
Mersin Archaeological Museum

- Anamur Museum
- Emirler Picnic Area and Museum
- Erdemli Yörük Museum
- Mersin Archaeological Museum
- Mersin Museum
- Mersin Atatürk Museum
- Mersin Naval Museum
- Mersin State Art and Sculpture Museum
- Mersin Urban History Museum
- Mersin Water Museum
- Narlıkuyu Museum
- Saint Paul's Church, Tarsus
- Silifke Museum
- Silifke Atatürk Museum
- Tarsus Çanakkale Park Museum
- Tarsus Museum
- Taşucu Amphorae Museum
- Taşucu Atatürk Museum

=== Muğla ===
- Bodrum Museum of Underwater Archeology
- Marmaris Archeological Museum
- Milas Museum
- Muğla Museum
- Zeki Müren Art Museum, Bodrum

=== Nevşehir ===
- Nevşehir Museum

=== Niğde ===
- Niğde Archaeological Museum

=== Ordu ===
- Ordu Ethnographical Museum

=== Osmaniye ===
- Karatepe-Aslantaş Open-Air Museum
- Osmaniye City Museum

=== Rize ===
- Rize Atatürk Museum

=== Sakarya ===
- Sakarya Museum

=== Samsun ===
- Alaçam Exchange Museum
- Samsun Atatürk Museum

=== Sinop ===
- Sinop Museum

=== Sivas ===
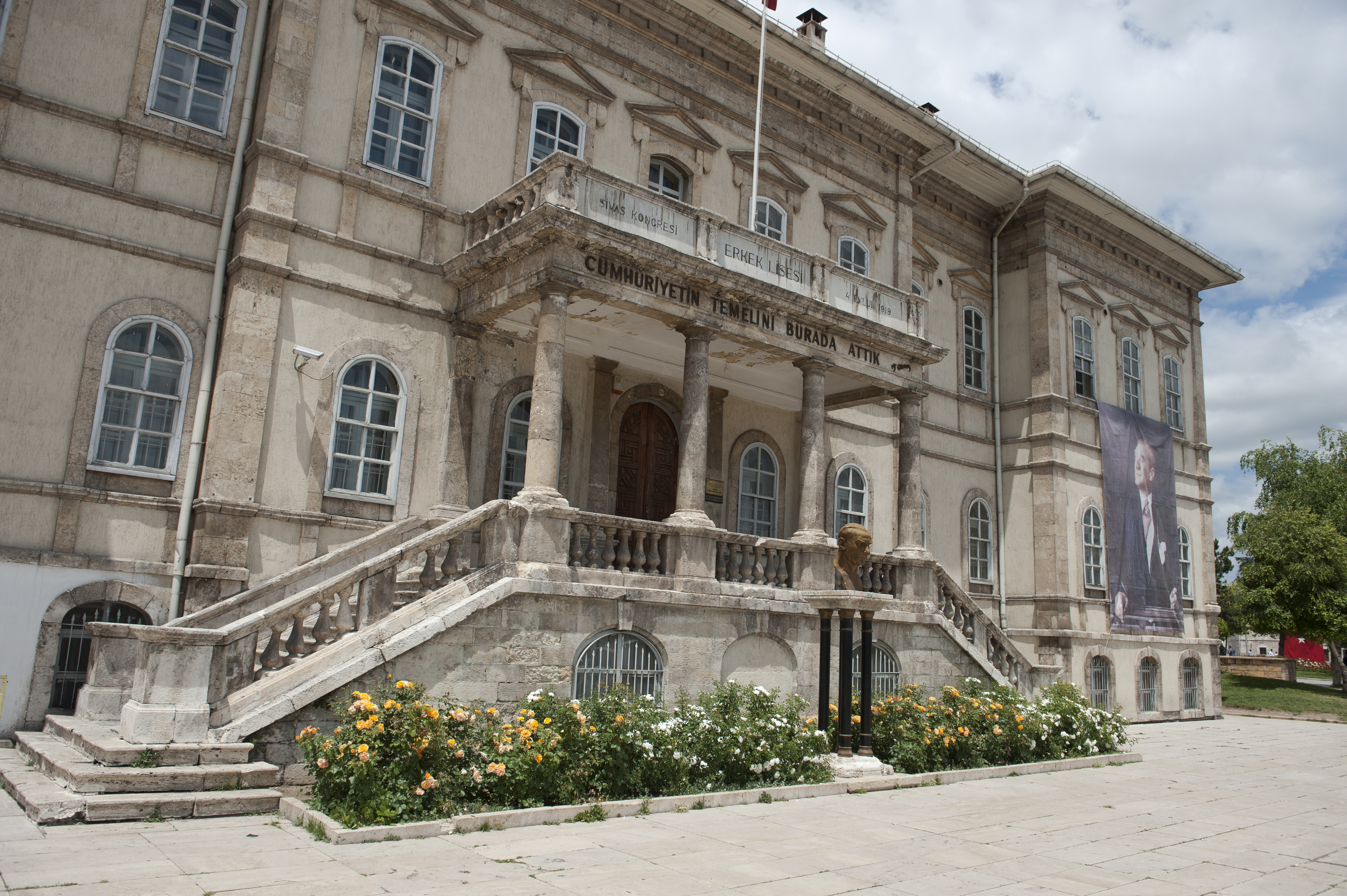
Sivas Congress and Ethnography Museum

- Sivas Congress and Ethnography Museum

=== Şanlıurfa ===
- Şanlıurfa Archaeology and Mosaic Museum

=== Tekirdağ ===
- Kutman Wine Museum
- Namık Kemal House Museum
- Rákóczi Museum
- Tekirdağ Museum of Archaeology and Ethnography

=== Tokat ===
- Tokat Museum

=== Trabzon ===
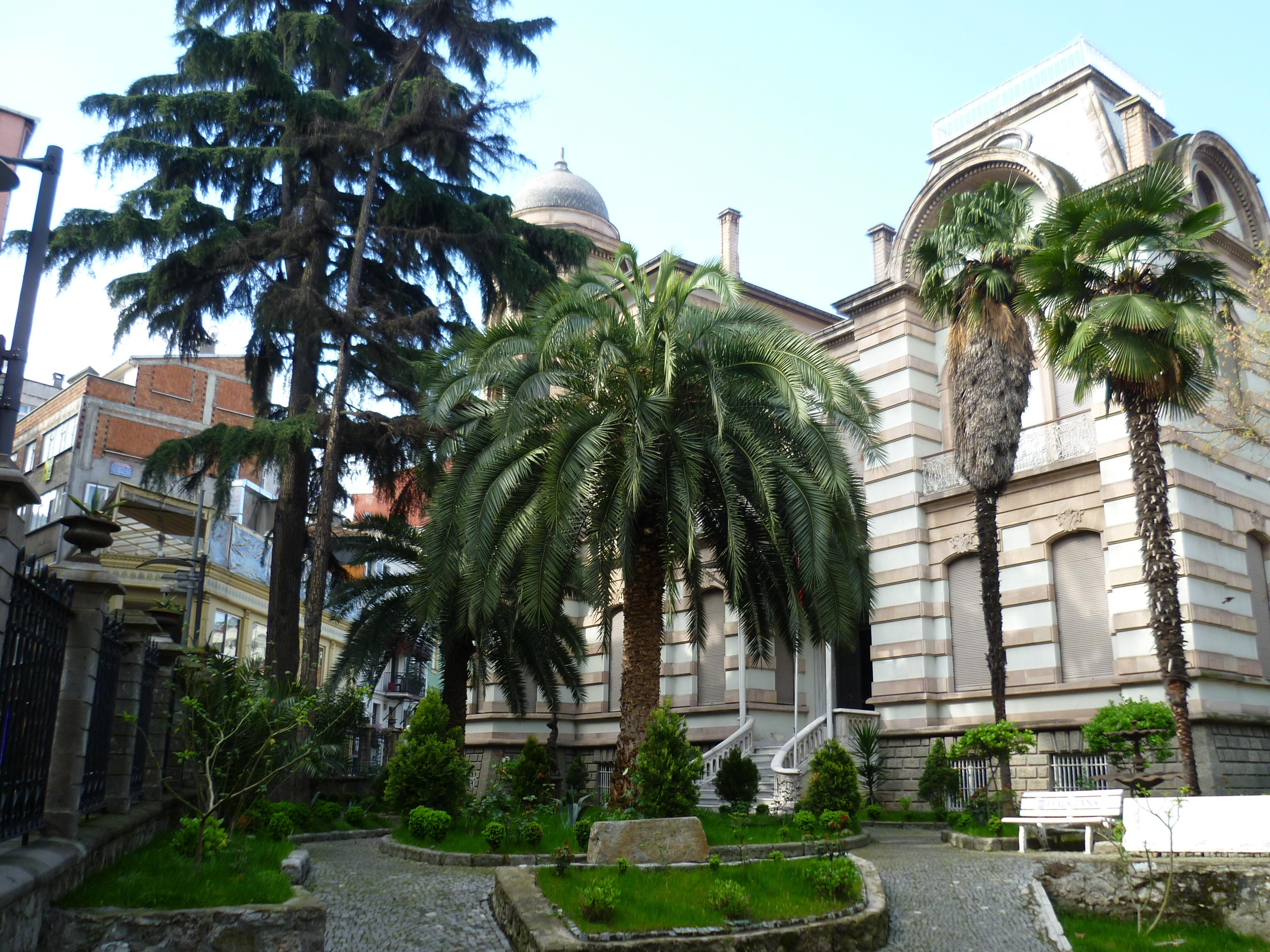
Trabzon Museum

- Hagia Sophia, Trabzon
- Trabzon Museum
- Sumela Monastery

=== Uşak ===
- Uşak Museum of Archaeology

=== Yozgat ===
- Yozgat Museum

== See also ==
- List of Intangible Cultural Heritage elements in Turkey
