= Gaziantep Mevlevi Culture and Foundation Works Museums =

Museum in Gaziantep, Turkey

- Gaziantep Mevlevihanesi Vakıf Müzesi
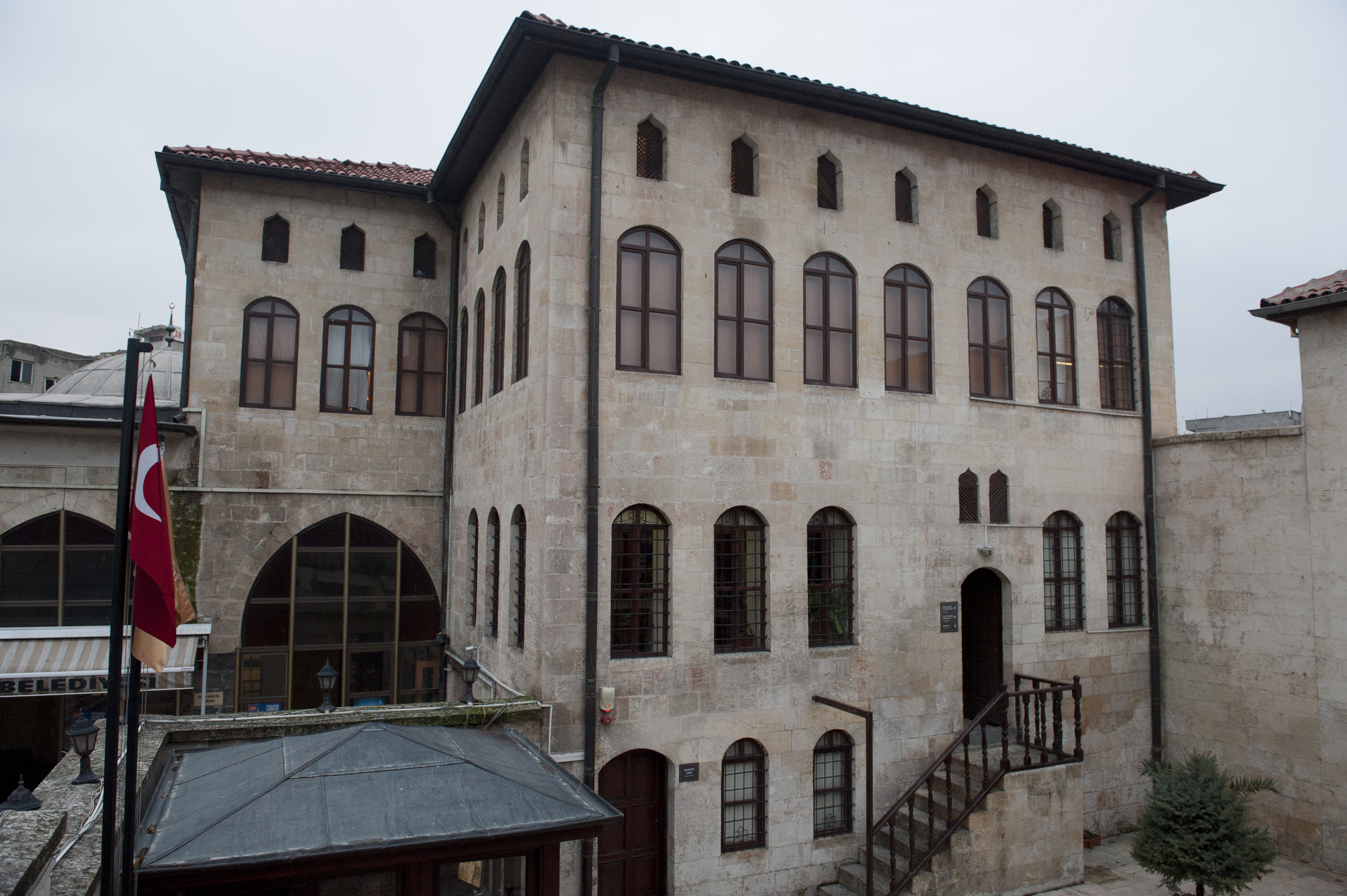

- Location within Turkey
- Established: 7 May 2007
- Location: Gaziantep, Gaziantep Province, Turkey
- Coordinates: 37°03′40.0″N 37°23′16.3″E
- Type: museum

The Gaziantep Mevlevi Culture and Foundation Works Museums (Turkish: Gaziantep Mevlevihanesi Vakıf Müzesi) is a museum in Gaziantep, Gaziantep Province, Turkey.

== History ==
The museum was originally constructed as the Antep Mevlevi Lodge in 1638. Throughout the years, the building had been used as school, storage, office etc. In 2006, it was renovated to be a museum by the Gaziantep Regional Directorate of Foundations. The museum was finally opened on 7 May 2007 as the Gaziantep Mevlevi Culture and Foundation Works Museums.

== Architecture ==
The museum complex consists of two buildings. The main building consists of three stories. The other building located at the northern part of the complex has two stories.

== Exhibitions ==
The museum exhibits various works from Mevlevi Order culture. It also features various hand written Quran and calligraphy.

== See also ==
- Museums in Turkey
