= Bilecik Museum =

- Bilecik Müzesi
- Anamur Museum
- Established: 2006; 20 years ago
- Coordinates: 40°08′37″N 29°58′55″E
- Type: Archaeology museum, Ethnographic museum
- Collections: Paleolithic age, Neolithic age, Bronze Age, Hellenistic Age, Roman Empire age, Byzantine Empire age and the Ottoman Empire age
- Owner: Ministry of Culture and Tourism

Bilecik Museum (Turkish: Bilecik Müzesi) is a museum in Bilecik, Turkey.

An ancient Ottoman building – demolished during the Turkish War of Independence in the 1920s – once stood on the site of the museum (at 40°08′37″N 29°58′55″E). After the liberation of Bilecik, a new building was constructed, for use as a court house. In 1997 it was handed over to the Ministry of Culture. Following restoration work, the former court house became Bilecik Museum in 2006. Up to 2010 it was a sub unit of Söğüt Museum. In 2010 it became an independent museum.

Because of its former use the building is quite big and has many rooms, and these are used to exhibit the museum's archaeological and ethnographic collections. The exhibits are arranged in chronological order. In the first three rooms are displayed items from the Paleolithic age, Neolithic age, Bronze Age, Hellenistic Age, Roman Empire age, Byzantine Empire age, and Ottoman Empire ages. The remaining ten rooms present ethnological items from the Ottoman era, such as ceramic and metallic objects, weapons, kitchen items, ornaments etc. Examples of clothing and architecture from Bilecik area are also on display.
