= Karabük Kardemir Iron-Steel Museum =

Karabük Kardemir Iron Steel Museum
- Karabük Kardemir Demir Çelik Müzesi
- Karabük Kardemir Iron Steel Museum
- Established: 1984; 42 years ago
- Coordinates: 41°11′N 32°38′E
- Type: Iron and steel tools
- Owner: Kardemir

Karabük Kardemir Iron-steel Museum (Turkish: Karabük Kardemir Demir Çelik Müzesi) is a museum in Karabük, Turkey. Kardemir is the name of the Turkish steel production plant in Karabük. Demir-Çelik in the native name is Turkish for "Iron-Steel"

The museum was established on 14 June 1984 within the Kardemir plant.

Most of the exhibits are about iron works. In the first hall, the images about the construction of the plant in late 1930s, samples of the early production, modern steel construction elements such as angle irons, structural steels, etc. are exhibited. In the second hall there are mockups of steel elements used in engineering such as spare parts of heavy industry, radio and TV transmitter antenna elements, locomotives hoists etc. In the archives section of the museum historical books and images are kept. Although not an archaeology museum, the museum is authorized to control the archaeological finds in the Karabük Province.

In 2006, the company made correspondence with the Ministry of Culture of the Republic of Turkey and the building's museum qualification was abolished. A new museum building is planned to be built in the future, and the museum activity was terminated in 2013 and its materials were protected within the company.
