= Burhaniye National Forces Culture Museum =

Museum in Turkey

- Burhaniye Kuva-yi Milliye Kültür Müzesi
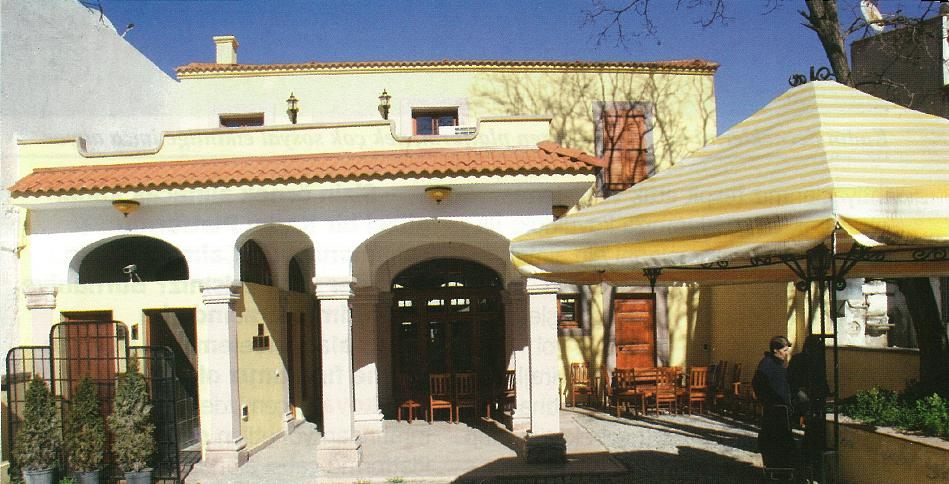
- Burhaniye National Forces Culture Museum

- Burhaniye National Forces Culture Museum in Turkey.
- Established: November 24, 2008; 17 years ago
- Location: Kocacamii karşısı, Burhaniye; Balıkesir Province, Turkey
- Coordinates: 39°30′13″N 26°58′52″E
- Type: Historic house, archaeology, ethnography
- Owner: Burhaniye Municipality

Burhaniye National Forces Culture Museum (Turkish: Burhaniye Kuva'i Milliye Kültür Müzesi) is a museum in Burhaniye district of Balıkesir Province in western Turkey.

== Location ==
Burhaniye is an ilçe (district) of Balıkesir Province. The museum is at 39°30′13″N 26°58′52″E

== History ==
The museum is housed in an 18th-century building. During the Ottoman Empire era, a part of the ground floor was used as a coffeehouse and another part as a hardware store. The upper floor served as a hotel. During the Turkish War of Independence, the building was turned into the headquarters of the local militia forces. During the early years of the Turkish Republic, it was used as a Halkevi building and later an officers club.

Burhaniye Municipality restored the building and opened it as a museum on 24 November 2008.

== Exhibited items ==
Although the name of the museum refers to War of Independence, the museum is an archaeology and ethnography museum. The ground floor is the archaeology section. Most of the items are Adramyttion finds, which were granted by Özkan Arıkantürk. There is also a trireme ship. In the section of coinage and ceramics, tweezers, brooch, earring, necklace and pins are also exhibited. In another section, glass articles such as unguentarium (eye drop bottle) are also exhibited.
