= Bursa Energy Museum =

Technology museum in Bursa, Turkey

Bursa Merinos Energy Museum (Turkish: Bursa Merinos Enerji Müzesi) is a technology museum dedicated to electricity, which was established in 2012 in the defunct power plant of an abandoned textile factory in Bursa, northwestern Turkey.

The museum is situated at 40°12′03″N 29°03′03″E on Dr. Sadık Ahmet Boulevard in Osmangazi district.

Merinos factory was one of the state-owned factories established in 1938. It was a textile factory using the wool of merino. With additions in 1944 and 1946 it became the biggest factory of its kind in Balkan and Mideastern countries. However, in 2004 the factory was closed within the scope of privatization program. Its 314,369 square metres (3,383,840 sq ft) land lot together with the infrastructure was handed over to the Bursa Metropolitan Municipality.

The factory had its own energy plant with a ground area of 3,200 square metres (34,000 sq ft). On 7 September 2012, the municipality established an energy museum. In the museum, the role of electricity in the civilization is emphasized. The history of electricity in the World, in Turkey and in Bursa, the illumination gadgets and the production of electricity are shown by the photographs and animations.
