= Ödemiş Museum =

Museum in İzmir Province, Turkey

- Ödemiş Müzesi
- Ödemiş Museum
- Established: 1983; 43 years ago
- Coordinates: 38°13′41″N 27°59′21″E
- Type: Ethnography, Archaeology,
- Collections: Bronze age,Classical age, Byzantine Empire, Ottoman Empire
- Owner: Ministry of Culture and Tourism

Ödemiş Museum is a museum in Ödemiş ilçe (district) of İzmir Province, Turkey. It is on Turkish state highway 310 situated slightly to the east of the town centre.

== History ==
The building land was donated by a private collector named Mutahhar Başoğlu in 1976, and the museum was opened in 1983. The items displayed in the museum were previously archived at the Tire and İzmir Archaeology Museums. In addition, Başoğlu donated archaeological and ethnographic material from his personal collection.

== The building and the exhibition ==
The museum is a tent-shaped building with a basement and the ground floor. There is only one hall for the exhibitions. Although the majority of the items are ethnographic in nature, there are also archaeological items from the late Bronze Age, classical age and the Byzantine Empire age. Among these are ceramics, cult figures, oil lamps, cutters, axes, ornaments, earthenware objects, figurines, sculptures, bronze and glass objects. In the ethnography section there are objects from the Ottoman Empire such as copper and silver objects, weapons, clothes and embroidery. There are also 2545 coins from various ages. The total number of exhibits is 4458.
