= Museum of Woodworking =

Museum in Turkey

Coordinates: 39°45′46″N 30°31′31″E

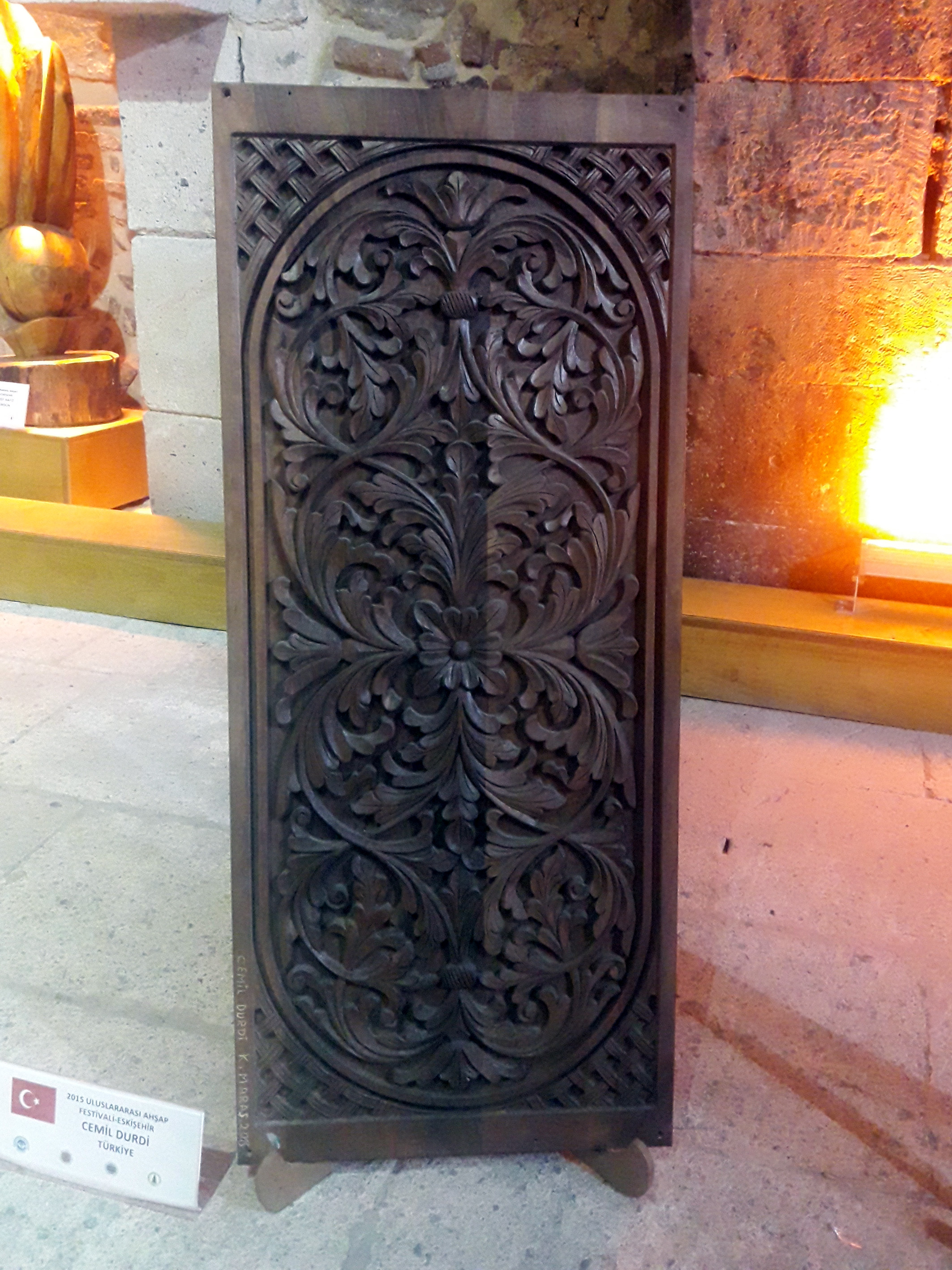
Eskişehir Woodworking Museum (Cemil Durdi's work)

Museum of Woodworking (Turkish: Ahşap Eserler Müzesi or Ahşap Eserler Galerisi) is an art museum and gallery dedicated to wood working. It is located in Eskişehir, Turkey.

The museum and art gallery was established by the Municipality of Odunpazarı in the context of the International Wood Carved Sculptures Festival hosted. It was opened on May 25, 2016. It was situated in the Seramik Park in Odunpazarı district, before it was relocated to its current place at Kurşunlu Mosque and Complex in May 2017. There are 160 wooden articles on display, which were handcrafted for the 3rd International Wodworking Festival hosted 2015 in Turkey, and for the 2016 International Wood Carved Sculptures Festival. The 4th International Wood Carved Sculptures Festival was held at the museum in May 2018 under the motto "The Voice of The Wood" (Turkish: Ahşabın Sesi).

The museum is open to public every day, but Mondays, between 10:00 and 18:00 hours.
