= Alaçam Population Exchange Museum =

Museum in Samsun Province, Turkey

- Alaçam Mübadele Müzesi
- Location within Turkey
- Established: 2010; 16 years ago
- Coordinates: 41°36′20″N 35°35′49″E
- Type: Ethnography

Alaçam Population Exchange Museum (Turkish: Alaçam Mübadele Müzesi) is a museum in Alaçam in Samsun Province, Turkey.

== Background ==
According to the Convention Concerning the Exchange of Greek and Turkish Populations signed in Lausanne on 30 January 1923, after the Turkish War of Independence, the Moslem population of Greece (except West Thrace) and the Greek Orthodox population of Turkey (except Istanbul and certain islands) were to be exchanged. This exchange was compulsory, with those involved having no right to ever return to their former homeland. In Turkey, Muslims arriving from Greece were known as mübadils: Mübadele means "exchange" and mübadil means "those who were exchanged".

== The building and the exhibition ==
The two storey building in a neighborhood named Kızlargarajı is a 19th-century building which was used as a primary school during the Ottoman Empire era. In 2010 it was restored by the local authority of Samsun. In the ground floor, in addition to administrative services, there is a thematic gallery of exchange photos. The exhibition galleries are in the upper floor. These are ethnographic items such as clothes, kitchen tools and chests of the mübadils. Also the copies of the passaports used during the exchange are exhibited.
