= Kilis Museum =

Museum in Kilis District, Turkey

- Kilis Müzesi
- Kilis Museum
- Established: 2012; 14 years ago
- Coordinates: 36°43′01″N 37°06′41″E
- Type: Archaeology, Ethnography
- Owner: Ministry of Culture

Kilis Museum is a museum in Kilis, Turkey.

== Location ==
The museum is in Kilis, one of the recent province centers of Turkey. It is on Nemika street at 36°43′01″N 37°06′41″E.

== History ==
The museum is situated in a mansion named Neşet Efendi Konağı. The mansion was built in 1927. In 1979 the Ministry of Culture purchased the building. Between 1986–2008 it was the Kilis Public Library. On 20 June 2012 it was opened as the museum of Kilis.

== Exhibited items ==
Kilis is situated in an area rich in archaeologic finds. Especially a tumulus named Oylum Höyük just 6 kilometres (3.7 mi) southeast of Kilis centrum, is an important source of archaeologic finds. The ground floor of the museum is the archaeology section. In the first room paleolithic and neolithic finds are exhibited. The second room is reserved for the early Bronze Age and the third room is reserved for the mid Bronze Age. Late Bronze Age, Iron Age, Hellenistic, Roman and Byzantine items are in the main hall.

The upper floor is the ethnography section. Among the six rooms one room is the guest room of the Kilis citizens with classical furniture and mannequins representing three generations. One room is the bedroom and another one is the kitchen with its copper cockware.
