= Bursa Karagöz Museum =

Museum in Bursa, Turkey

- Bursa Karagöz Müzesi
- Location within Marmara
- Established: 2007; 19 years ago
- Location: Çekirge St., Çekirge, Osmangazi, Bursa, Turkey
- Coordinates: 40.202029°N 29.027140°E
- Type: Folkloric art
- Collections: Shadow play pPuppets
- Visitors: 129,000 (2018)
- Owner: Bursa Metropolitan Municipality

Bursa Karagöz Museum (Turkish: Bursa Karagöz Müzesi) is a museum located at Osmangazi in Bursa, northwestern Turkey, dedicated to the folkloric shadow play figures Karagöz and Hacivat. It was established in 2007.

== Background ==
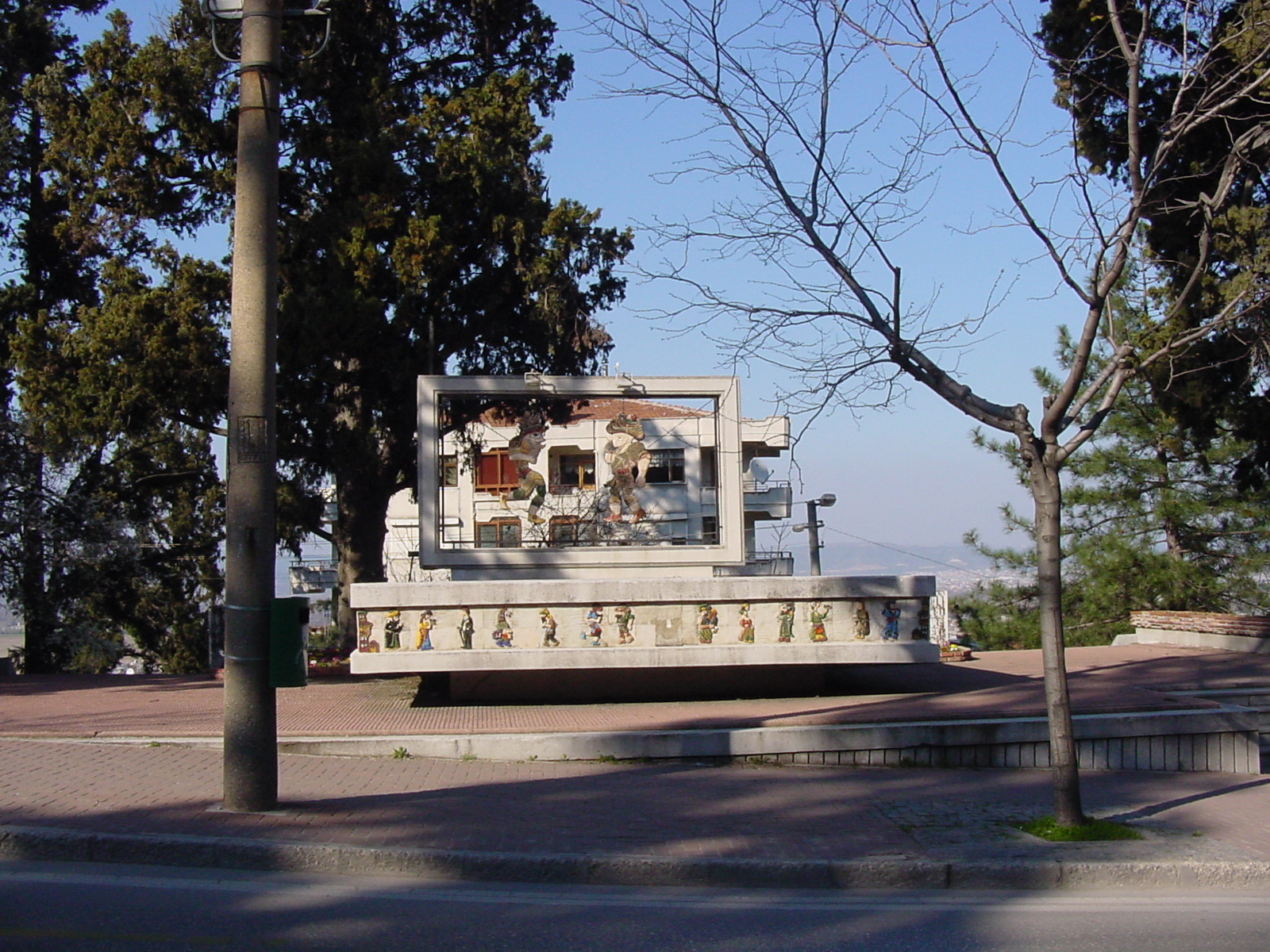
Monument of Karagöz and Hacivat in Bursa.

The museum is located on the Çekirge Street in Çekirge quarter of Osmangazi district in Bursa. It is situated in a former power distribution building. The building, which was sometime not in use, was converted into an art house by the Bursa Municipality and the Bursa Art and Culture Foundation, and opened on 15 June 1997. It was named the "Karagöz House" in regard to the "Manument of Karagz and Hacivat" standing just across the building, which is a cultural symbol of Bursa. The art arthouse consisted of a theatre hall, where traditional Turkish shadow play Karagöz and Hacivat was performed, a gallery of Karagöz and Hacivat puppets, a speciality library and a design workshop. With the establishment of the international puppetry association UNIMA's Bursa branch, the art house turned into a center to revive the traditional shadow play.

Ten years later of its foundation, the art house was converted into Karagöz Museum by the Bursa Metropolitan Municipality in 2007.

== Exhibits ==
The museum consists of two galleries. The first gallery is about the history of shadow play. In the second gallery, 61 pieces of original Karagöz puppets gathered from traditional shadow play collections are on display. In addition, collections of several puppeteers enrich the same gallery. There are also Karagöz-Hacivat cartoons from Ottoman era newspapers and various ephemera on Karagöz. The museum hosts also temporary exhibitions.

== Admission ==
The museum is open every day from 9:30 to 17:30 hours local time, but closed on Mondays. During the semester holidays, school children show interest to visit the museum. Shadow play performances are free of charge. In 2018, the number of museum visitors totalled to 129,000.
