= Eskişehir Caricature Museum =

Museum in Turkey

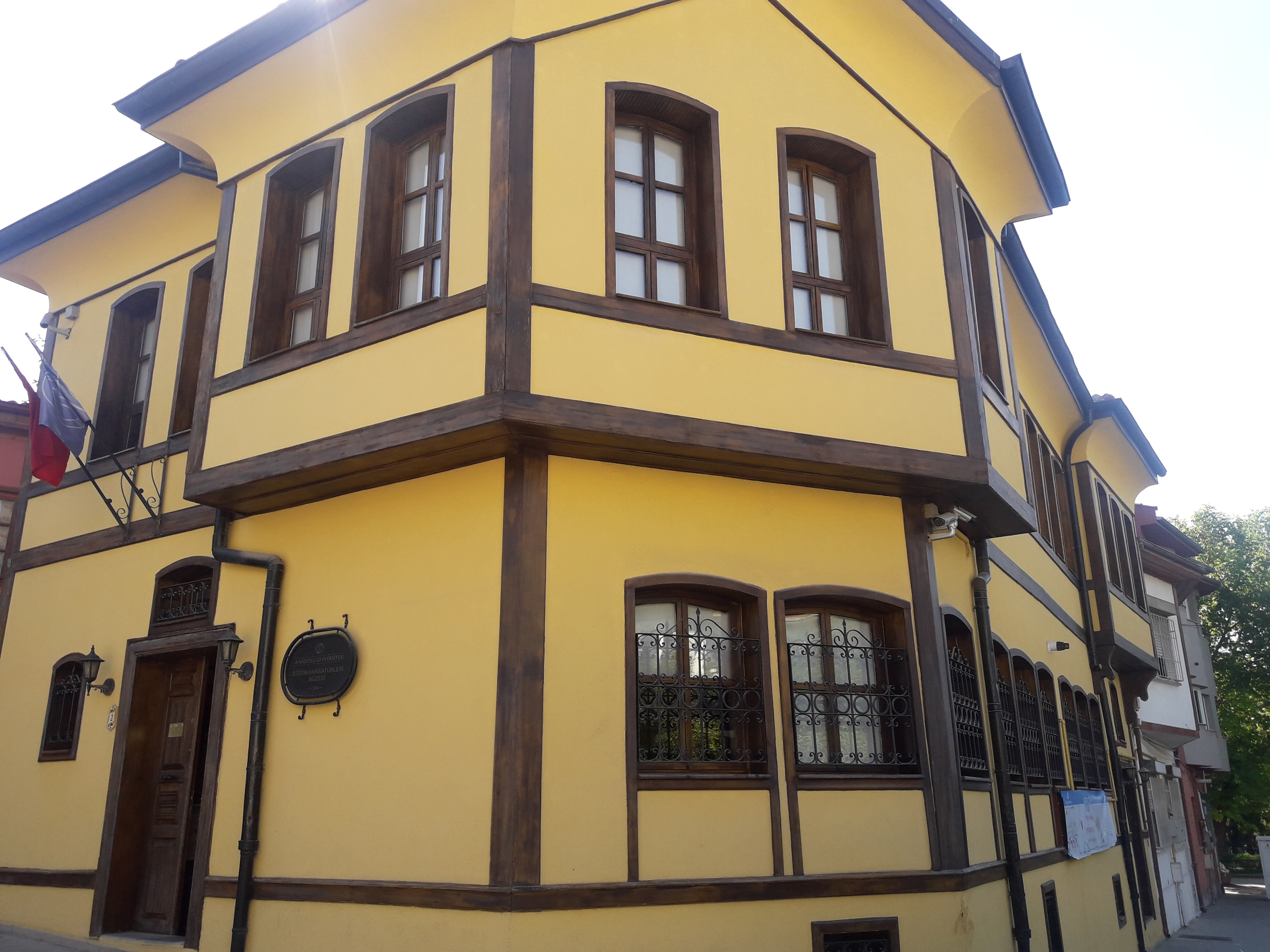
Eskişehir Caricature Museum building

Eskişehir Caricature Museum is a museum in Eskişehir, Turkey The museum is in Odunpazarı ilçe (second level municipality) of Eskişehir at 39°45′57″N 30°31′32″E. It is in a neighborhood of museums.

The building is a residence house built in 1900s. It was restored and used as a museum of Anadolu University. Its total service area is 265 square metres (2,850 sq ft). Each room of the house is dedicated to different displays such as, permanent display, temporary display, Eskişehir caricaturists’ display, portraits of famous caricaturists etc. There is also a library in the museum

== Gallery ==
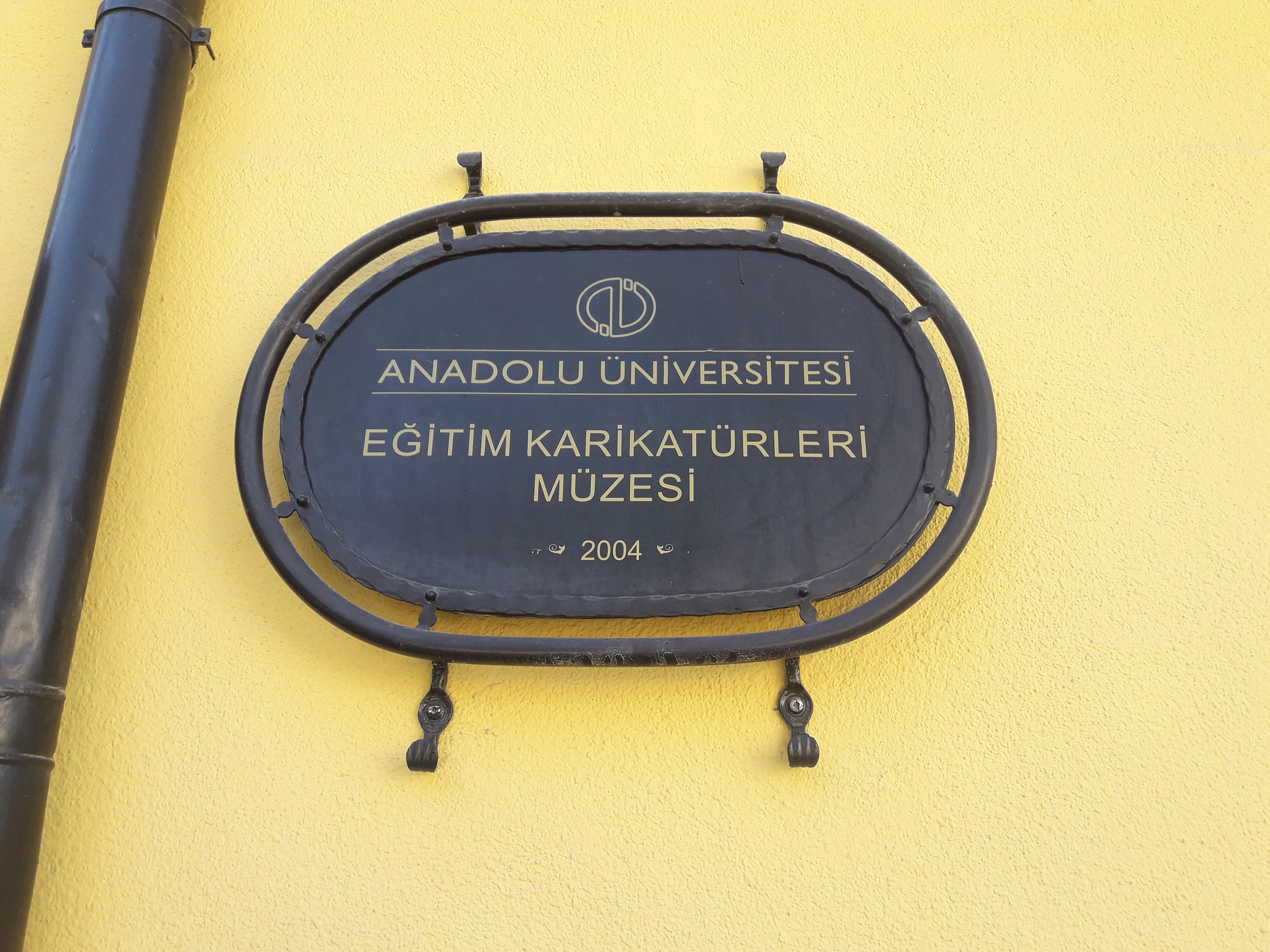
Eskişehir Caricature Museum entrance

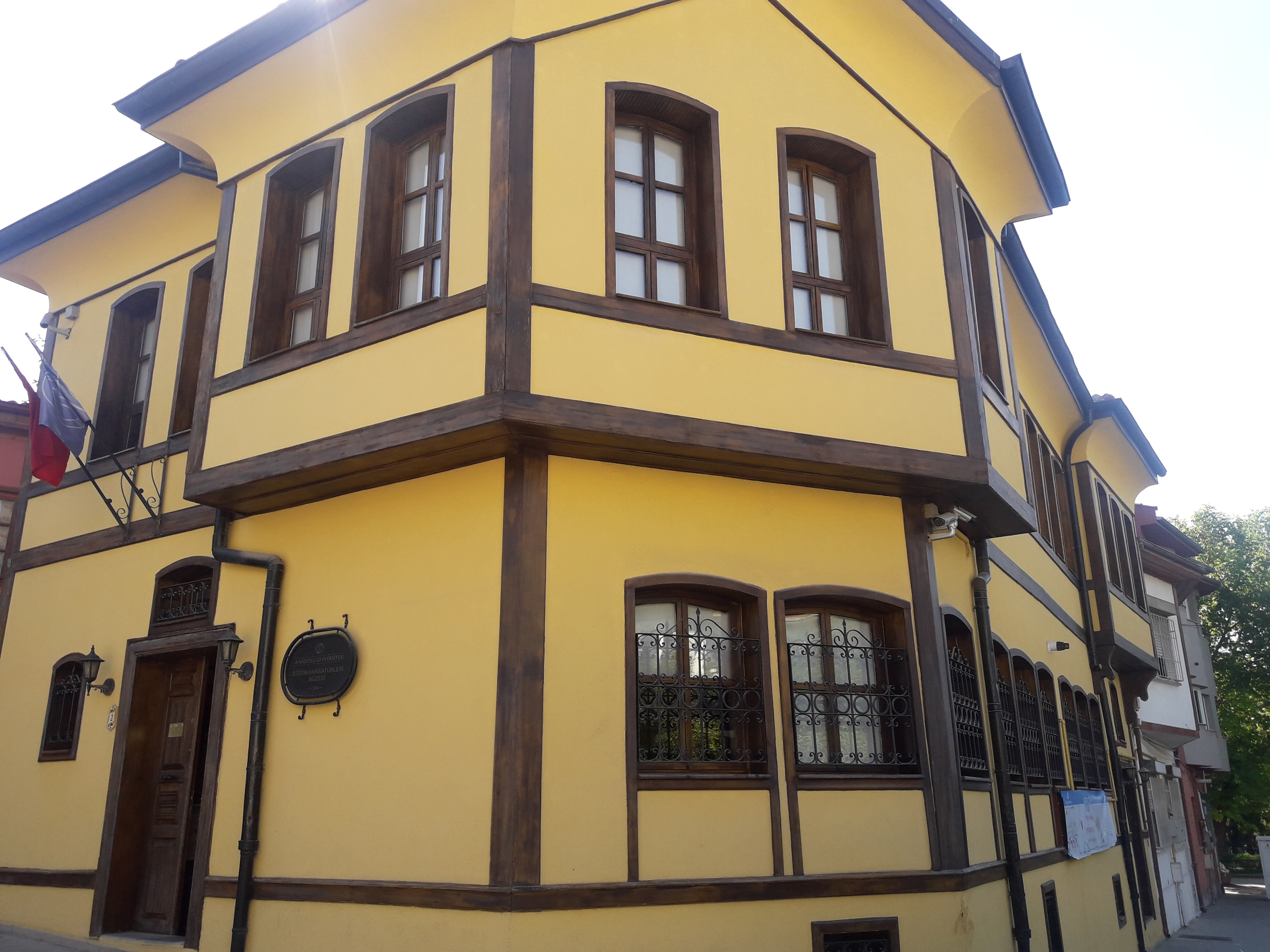
Eskişehir Caricature Museum building

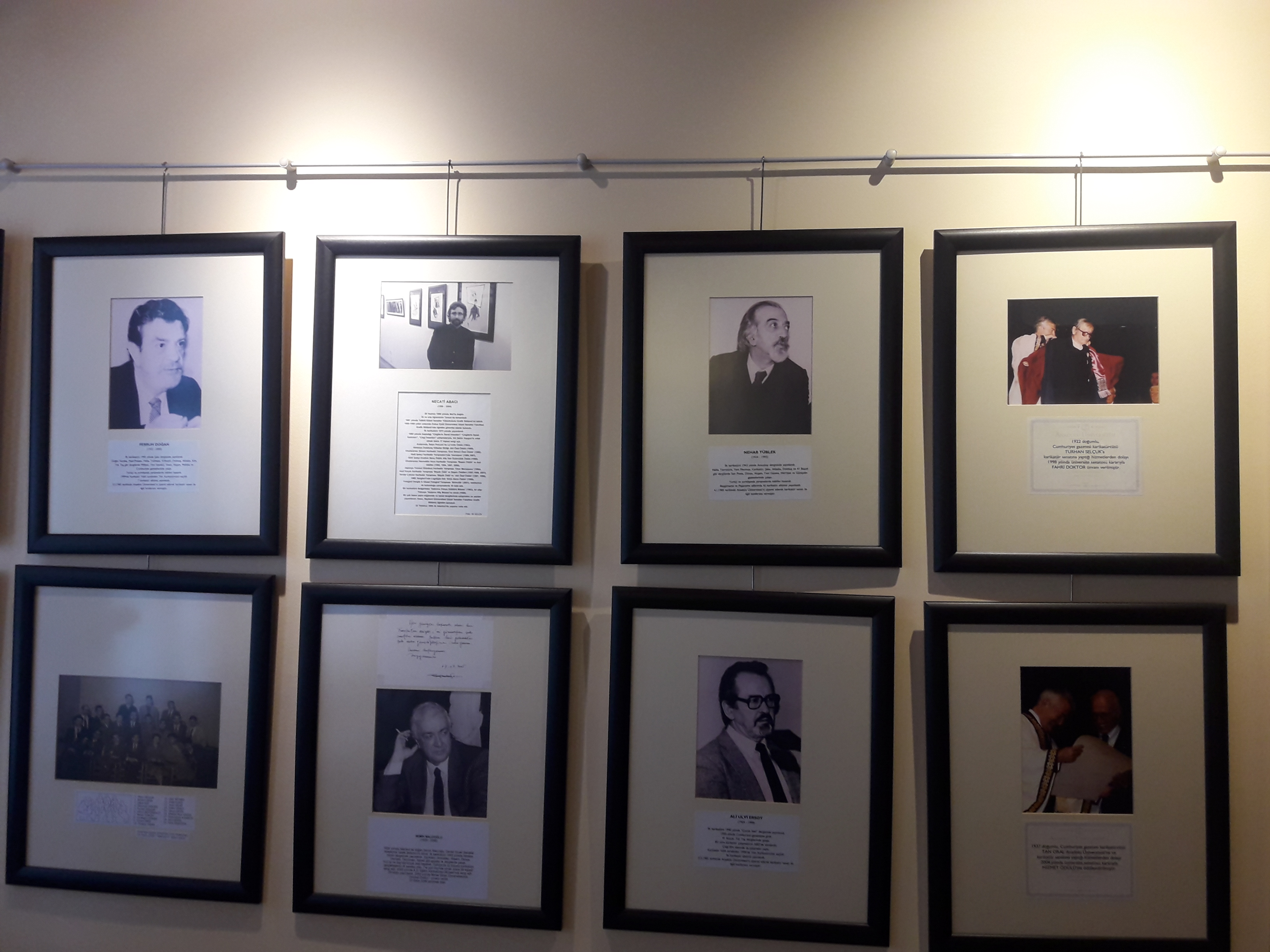
Eskişehir Caricature Museum portraits

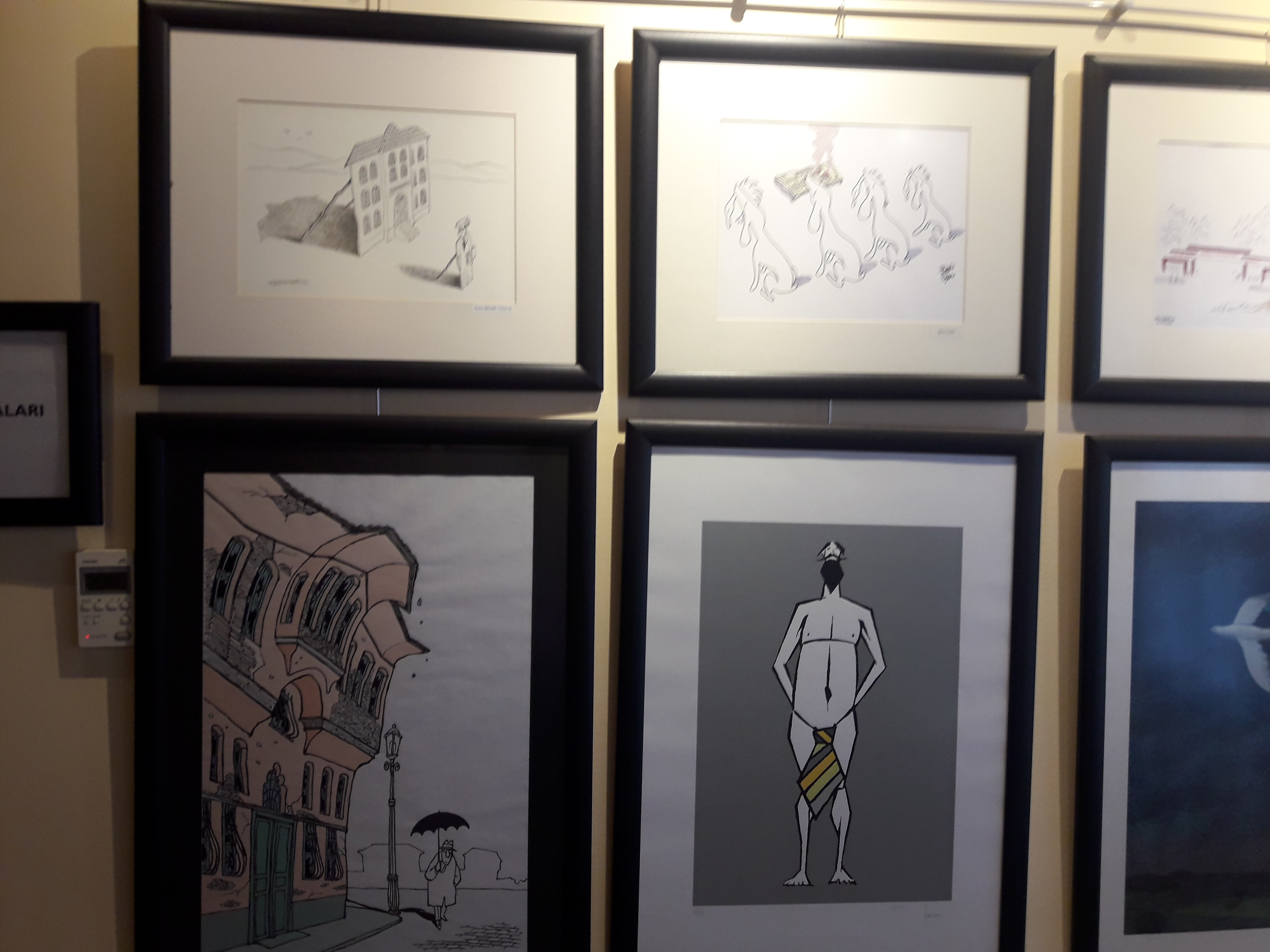
Eskişehir Caricature Museum some examples
