= Natural History Museum of Ege University =

University museum in İzmir, Turkey

Natural Museum of Ege University
- Ege Üniversitesi Doğa Tarihi Müzesi
- Location within Turkey
- Established: 1973; 53 years ago
- Coordinates: 38°27′31″N 27°13′53″E
- Type: Natural History
- Collection size: about 4000
- Owner: Ege University

Natural History Museum of Ege University (Turkish: Ege Universitesi Doğa Tarihi Müzesi) is a university museum in İzmir, Turkey. The museum is in the campus of the Ege University next to Faculty of Science at 38°27′31″N 27°13′53″E. The museum was founded in 1973. Between 1973 and 1991 it was an institute of the faculty. After 1991 it became a subunit of the rectorship.

== Exhibited items ==
There are 4000 items in the exhibition. There are 6 halls in 2,500 square metres (27,000 sq ft) area.

1. Paleontology (1168 items)
2. Rocks and minerals (811 items)
3. Birds (168 items)
4. Entrance (Turkish fauna) (937 items)
5. General zoology (766 items)
6. Osteology and evolution (81 items)
