= Tülomsaş Museum =

The museum's garden in August 2026

Tülomsaş Museum is a transport technology museum in Eskişehir, Turkey.

The museum is situated in a building of the Tülomsaş company at 39°46′34″N 30°30′19″E. It was opened to visits on 3 March 2018. Some of the displayed items are the following:

- Devrim: The first ever Turkish manufactured automobile in 1961. It was never put into mass production. There are only two prototype cars, of which the other one is on display in Ankara.
- K2200: Narrow-gauge railway locomotive manufactured by the company.
- Karakurt: The first ever Turkish locomotive manufactured in Turkey in 1961. It was used for 15 years by Turkish State Railways.

== Gallery ==
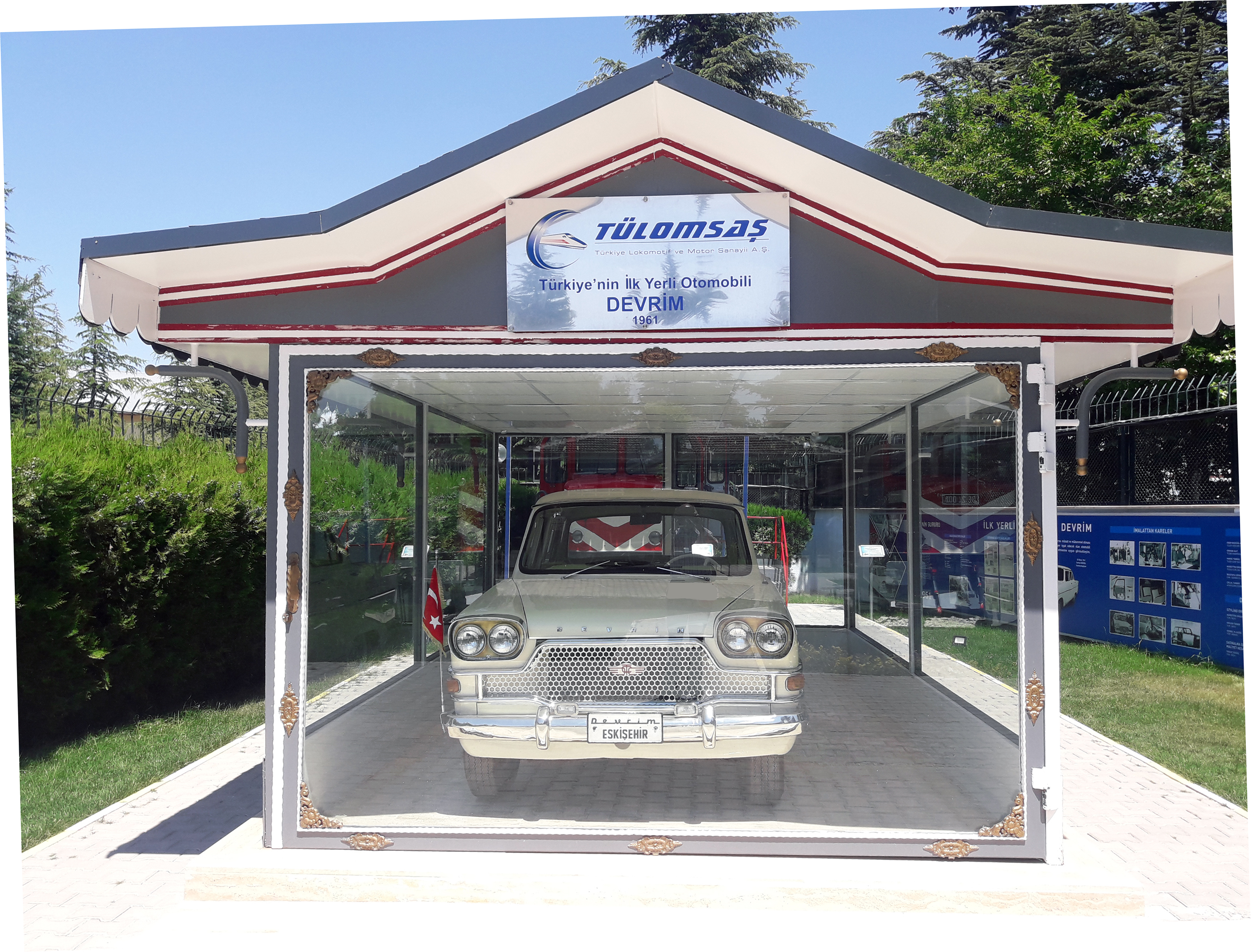
Automobile Devrim

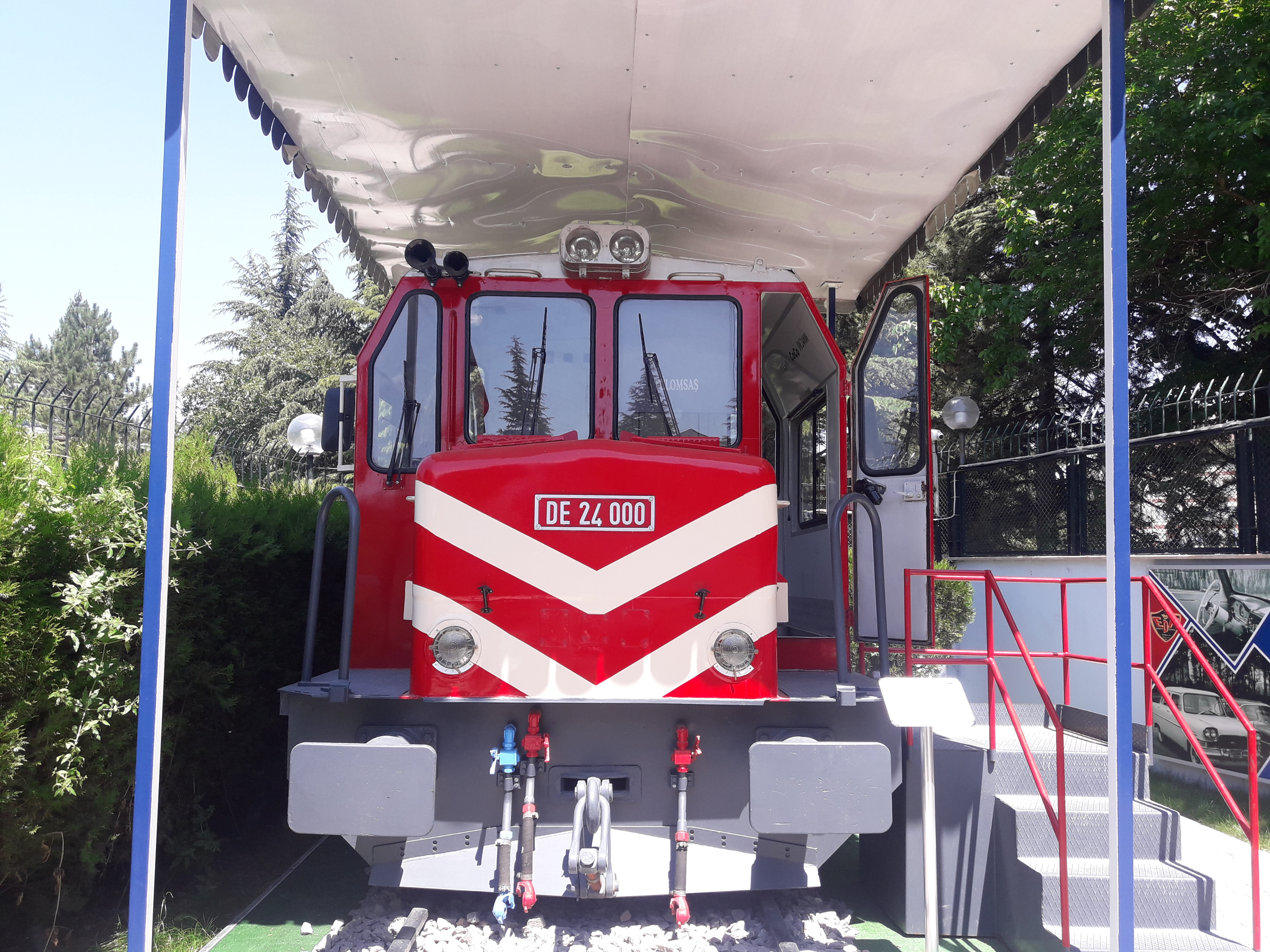
Locomotive Karakurt

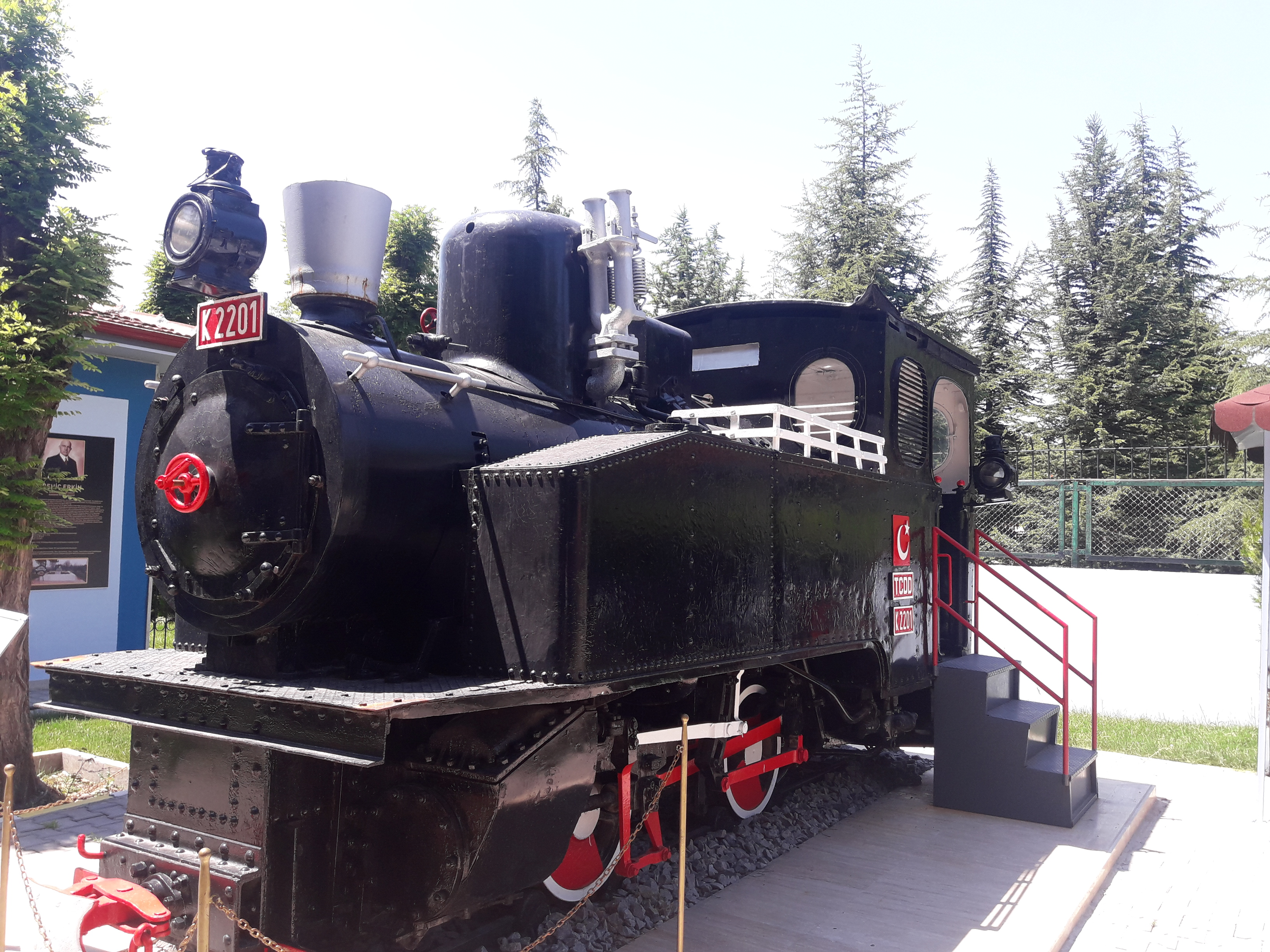
Locomotive K2200
