= Nevşehir Museum =

Museum in Nevşehir, Turkey

- Nevşehir Müzesi
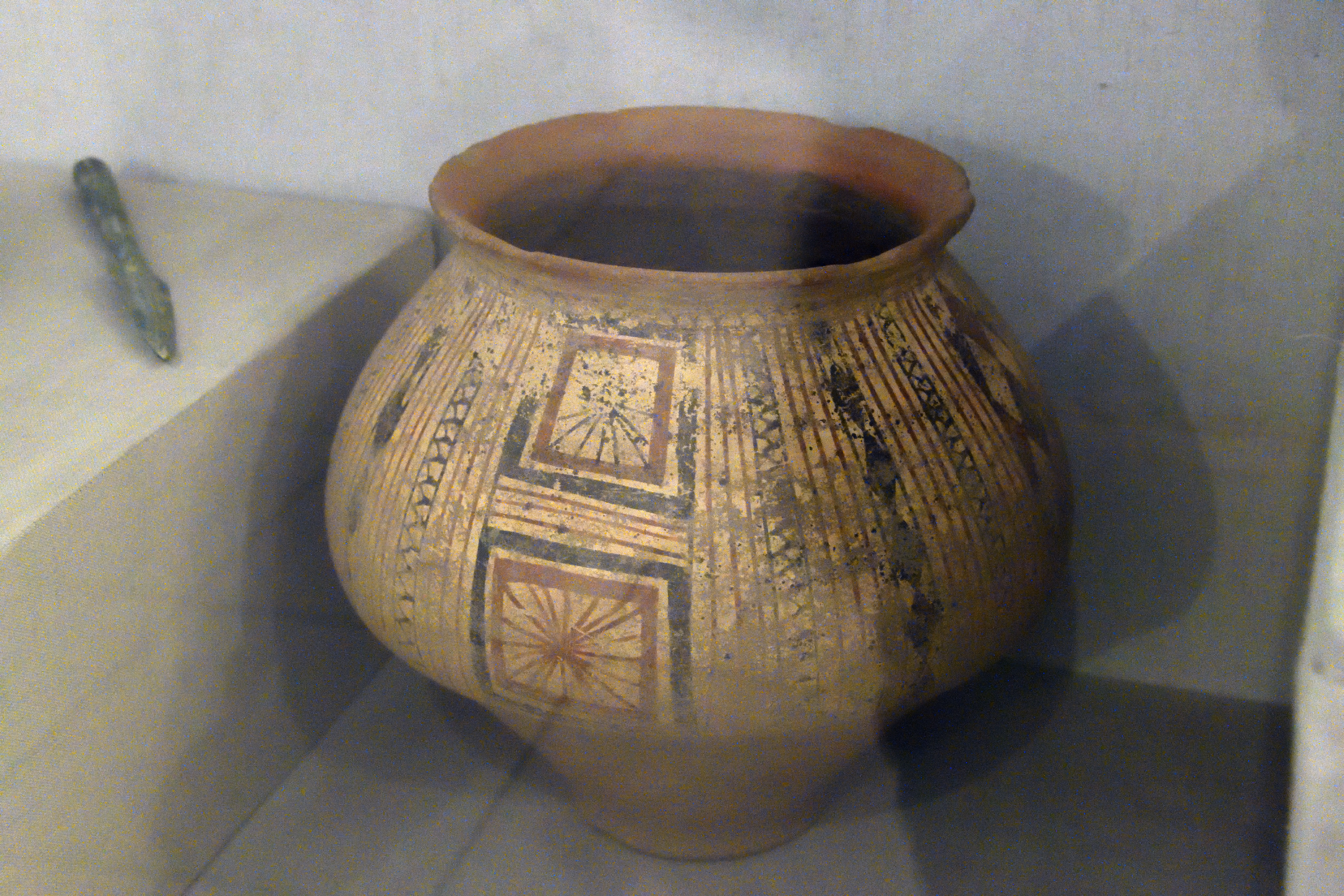

- Nevşehir Museum
- Established: 1987; 39 years ago
- Location: 350 evler, Nevşehir, Turkey
- Type: Archaeology, Ethnography
- Collections: Neolithic, Chalcolithic Bronz, Phrygia, Urartu, Hellenistic, Roman Byzantine, Ottoman
- Collection size: 6942 archaeologic and ethnographic+8795 coins
- Owner: Ministry of Culture and Tourism

Nevşehir Museum (Turkish: Nevşehir Müzesi) is in Nevşehir, Turkey.

Nevşehir is the provincial center in the region which is the Capadocia of the antiquity and known for its fairy chimneys. The museum at 38°37′41″N 34°43′30″E is on Türbe Street in 350 Evler neighborhood of Nevşehir.

The former museum of Nevşehir was in a historical building which served from 1967 to 1987 when a new building was opened as a museum.

In the museum there are two halls, one for archaeology and one for ethnography. In the archaeology section, items of the Neolithic, Chalcolithic Bronz, Phrygia, Urartu, Hellenistic, Roman and Byzantine ages are exhibited. There are also some items from Iran, Mesopotamia and Cyprus. In the ethnography section, illumination tools, hand written books, weapons, local clothes hand works, ornaments, and kitchen tools are displayed.
