= Osmaniye City Museum =

Museum on Turkey

- Osmaniye Kent Müzesi
- Osmaniye Museum
- Coordinates: 37°04′23″N 36°14′49″E
- Type: Urban history
- Owner: Osmaniye municipality

Osmaniye City Museum (Turkish: Osmaniye Kent Müzesi) is a museum in Osmaniye, Turkey. It is in Osmaniye at 37°04′23″N 36°14′49″E on Karaoğlan Street.

Two lion sculptures at the entrance, represent the Hittite dominance in the antiquity. The octangular star in the floor represents Seljuks' dominance in the Medieval Age and the double-headed eagle figure represents the Turkic dominance. In the main market (arasta) of the museum almost forgotten professions in Osmanye are displayed by wax sculptures; these are spoon making, saddle making, carpet weaving, tailoring, forging jewellery and horseshoeing. The tools used in these professions, the carpets and the natural dyes used in carpet weaving are also displayed. According to the mayor of Osmaniye 600 items are displayed.

A room is reserved for the occupation of Osmaniye following the World War I by the French Army. Two figures of the Turkish resistance, namely Palalı Süleyman and Rahime Hatun are visualized.
