= Ali Demirsoy Natural History Museum =

Museum in Kemaliye, Turkey

- Ali Demirsoy Doğa Tarihi Müzesi
- Ali Demirsoy Natural History Museum
- Established: 2006
- Location: Halilağa Türkmen Mahallesi Okullar Sokak No5 Kemaliye, Turkey
- Coordinates: 39°15′39″N 38°29′51″E
- Type: Natural history
- Owner: Ali Demirsor (supported by Tubitak)

Ali Demirsoy Natural History Museum (Turkish: Ali Demirsoy Doğa Tarihi Müzesi) is a museum in Kemaliye, Turkey.

The museum is in the campus of Hacı Ali Akın Multi-Program Highschool in Kemaliye ilçe (district), of Erzincan Province. Its founder is Professor Ali Demirsoy of Hacettepe University. It is supported by Tubitak (Scientific and Technological Research Council of Turkey).

== Exhibited items ==
Exhibited items are the following:

- Various minerals and rocks
- Gastropoda, bivalvia and echinodermata from Kemaliye area
- Single cell plants and animals (shown under microscope)
- Lichens, the earliest living forms on soil
- Algae from Kemaliye area
- Some invertebrates in formaldehyde and alcohol
- Herbarium and insects on panels
- Fishes in formaldehyde and alcohol
- Amphibians in Formaldehyde and alcohol
- Venomous snakes and other reptiles in formaldehyde and alcohol
- Birds in formaldehyde and alcohol
- Examples of stuffed mammalia such as bear, wolf, wildcat, marten, mountain goat, badger, squirrel, rodents etc.native to area.
- Herbarium of more than half of all plants native to Kemaliye area

The number of plant fossils is about 800 and insect fossils is about 2000. One of the recent additions to the museum is the elephant skeleton from Ankara Zoo.
