= Emirler Archaeological Site and City Forest Museum =

Small museum in Turkey

Emirler Archaeological Site and City Forest Museum (Turkish: Emirler Örenyeri Ve Kent Ormanı Müzesi) is a small museum located in Mersin Province, southern Turkey, exhibiting archaeological artifacts found at site and some fauna of the city forest.

== Location ==
The museum is next to Emirler village of Mersin Province at 36°49′33″N 44°29′51″E.Its distance to Mersin is about 13 kilometres (8.1 mi)

== Museum ==
The Ministry of Forestry decided to establish a picnic area in the southern slopes of Toros Mountains where Mersin is in the view. During the construction, some archaeological remains were unearthed. Following a rescue excavations a Roman road, a necropolis, sarcophagi and a cistern were also unearthed along with other finds such as a 1st-century unguentarium which were transferred to Mersin Archaeological Museum. The hitherto unknown settlement may be a Hellenistic, Roman or early Byzantine settlement.

== The Forestry Museum ==
In the same area Ministry of Forestry established a forestry museum in a wooden cottage. In the museum, insects, butterflies and birds of the forest are displayed. There is also a 5 kilometres (3.1 mi) walking track.
