= Erdemli Yörük Museum =

Museum in Mersin Province, Turkey

- Location of Erdemli Yörük Museum in Turkey
- Established: 2018
- Location: Erdemoğlu Blv. 119 Erdemli, Mersin Province, Turkey
- Coordinates: 36.6025°N 34.3111°E
- Type: Ethnography

Erdemli Yörük Museum is a museum of ethnography in Mersin Province, southern Turkey exhibiting life style of nomadic people in Anatolia.

The museum is in Erdemli ilçe (district) close to Mediterranean sea side at 36°36′09″N 34°18′40″E. The museum was established by the Erdemli municipality in 2018.

Yörüks were semi nomadic Turkmen people. Although most are settled by now, the Yörük culture still persists. In Erdemli which hosted many Yörük tribes in the past is particularly rich in Yörük ethnography. The items in the yörük museum are the tools and the costumes of the Yörük people from the villages in Erdemli area.

The visiting hours are 8.00-18.00. The museum admission is free of charge.
