= Söğüt Ertuğrul Gazi Museum =

- Söğüt Ertuğrul Gazi Müzesi
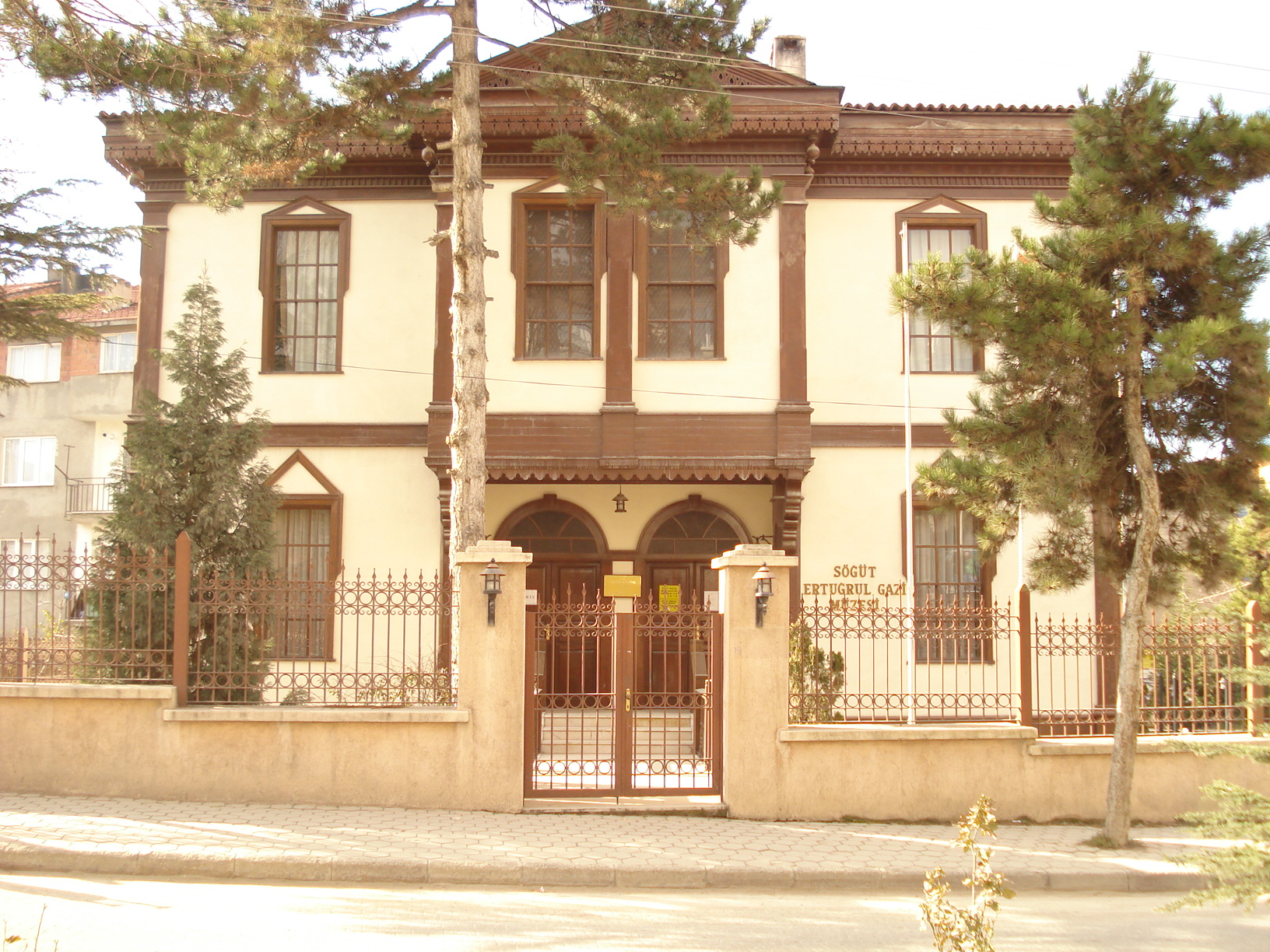

- Söğüt Ertuğrul Gazi Museum
- Established: 2001; 25 years ago
- Location: Kayhan Mah. Ertuğrulgazi Cad. No:17 Söğüt/Bilecik
- Coordinates: 40°00′55″N 30°10′54″E
- Type: Ethnographic museum
- Collections: mainly Ottoman Empire
- Collection size: 1310
- Owner: Ministry of Culture and Tourism

Söğüt Ertuğrul Gazi Museum (a.k.a. Söğüt Museum, Turkish: Söğüt Ertuğrul Gazi Müzesi) is a museum in Söğüt ilçe (district) of Bilecik Province, Turkey.

Söğüt is notable as being the town from which the Ottoman Empire originated. Ertuğrul, the father of the Osman I (the founder of the empire), has a tomb in Söğüt. Although bearing his name, the museum building is not in the same quarter of Söğüt.

Originally the three-storey wooden building was an Ottoman dispensary built in the early 1900s. In 2001, after restoration, the building was opened as a museum.

The museum has many ethnographic items from the Bilecik area Yörüks: old clothes, carpets, weighing instruments, flags, weapons and coin purses. There are also archaeological items such as earthenware kitchen tools from the Roman Empire and coins from the Roman, Byzantine and Ottoman eras.
