= List of ethnographic museums =

Ethnographic museums, also known as ethnological museums, conserve, display and contextualize items relevant to the field of ethnography, the systematic study of people and cultures. Such museums include:

== List by country or region ==
=== Albania ===
- Ethnographic Museum of Kavajë
- Gjirokastër Ethnographic Museum
- National Ethnographic Museum (Berat)
- Solomon Museum, Berat

=== Angola ===
- Dundo Museum

=== Austria ===
- Museum der Völker, Schwaz, Tyrol
- Weltmuseum Wien, Vienna

=== Argentina ===
- Juan B. Ambrosetti Museum of Ethnography

=== Azerbaijan ===
- Gala State Historical Ethnographic Reserve, Baku
- Historical-ethnographic museum of Khinalug village
- Museum of Archaeology and Ethnography, Baku
- National Museum of History of Azerbaijan, Baku
- Nizami Ganjavi Ganja State History-Ethnography Museum

=== Bulgaria ===
- Ethnographic and Archeological Museum, Elhovo

=== Brunei ===
- Malay Technology Museum

=== China ===
- China Ethnic Museum, Beijing

=== Croatia ===
- Ethnographic Museum, Zagreb

=== Czech Republic ===
- Ethnographic Museum of the National Museum, Prague

=== Ecuador ===
- Mitad del Mundo Ethnographic Museum, San Antonio de Pichincha
- Museum of Anthropology and Contemporary Art, Guayaquil
- Pumapungo Museum, Cuenca

=== Ethiopia ===
- Ethnological Museum, Addis Ababa

=== France ===
- Musée alsacien, Strasbourg
- Musée alsacien, Haguenau
- Museon Arlaten, Arles
- Musée Arménien de France, Paris
- Musée des Arts africains, océaniens et amérindiens (MAAOA), Marseille
- Calvet Museum, Avignon
- Château de Boulogne-sur-Mer
- Musée dauphinois
- Departmental Museum of archaeology Gilort (Jérôme) Carcopino, Corsica
- Georges Labit Museum
- Musée de l'Homme
- Musée des Jacobins, Auch
- Musée du Quai Branly – Jacques Chirac, Paris
- Municipal Museum (Saverne)

=== Germany ===
- Dresden Museum of Ethnology
- Ethnographic Museum Heidelberg
- Ethnological Museum of Berlin
- German Emigration Center
- Hessenpark
- Karlsruhe Palace
- Landesmuseum Hannover
- Leipzig Museum of Ethnography
- Linden Museum
- Museum August Kestner
- Museum der Weltkulturen
- Museum Europäischer Kulturen
- Museum Godeffroy
- Museum am Rothenbaum
- Overseas Museum, Bremen
- Sammlung für Völkerkunde
- State Museum for Nature and Man

=== Georgia ===
- Ozurgeti History Museum, Ozurgeti
- Tbilisi Open Air Museum of Ethnography, Tbilisi

=== Greece ===
- Cyprus Ethnological Museum, Nicosia, Cyprus
- Ethnographic Museum, Pyrsogianni
- Folklife and Ethnological Museum of Macedonia and Thrace, Thessaloniki
- Historical and Ethnographical Museum of the Cappadocian Greeks, Nea Karvali
- Municipal Ethnographic Museum of Ioannina
- Museum of Cretan Ethnology, Crete

=== Hungary ===
- Ethnographic Museum (Budapest)

=== Indonesia ===
- Aceh Museum
- Balanga Museum
- Balaputradeva Museum
- Bengkulu Museum
- Benteng Heritage Museum
- Indonesia Museum, TMII, East Jakarta
- National Museum of Indonesia
- Lambung Mangkurat Museum
- Museum Negeri Pontianak

=== Italy ===
- Museo delle Genti d'Abruzzo
- Regole of Ampezzo Ethnographic Museum
- Sicilian Ethnographic Museum Giuseppe Pitrè

=== Israel ===
- Old Yishuv Courtyard

=== Japan ===
- National Museum of Ethnology, Suita

=== Libya ===
- Ethnographic Museum of Tripoli

=== Mexico ===
- Museo Nacional de las Culturas
- Museo Amparo

=== Morocco ===
- Tetouan Ethnographic Museum

=== Netherlands ===
- Museum Maluku
- Museon
- Museum of Contemporary Tibetan Art
- Nationaal Museum van Wereldculturen, which includes:
  - National Museum of Ethnology, Leiden
  - Tropenmuseum, Amsterdam
  - Africa Museum, Berg en Dal
- Wereldmuseum Amsterdam
- Wereldmuseum Leiden
- Wereldmuseum Rotterdam

=== Poland ===
- Ethnographic Museum of Kraków
- National Museum of Ethnography, Warsaw
- Ethnographic Museum of Toruń

=== Portugal ===
- House of the County
- Museum of Lavra School
- National Museum of Ethnology (Portugal)

=== Romania ===
- ASTRA National Museum Complex
- Dimitrie Gusti National Village Museum, Bucharest
- Ethnographic Museum of Transylvania
- Mikó Castle
- Museum of Oltenia
- Museum of Popular Architecture of Gorj
- Național Museum of the Romanian Peasant, Bucharest
- Palace of Culture (Iași)
- Vergu-Mănăilă House

=== Russia ===
- Khokhlovka
- Kunstkamera, Saint Petersburg
- Lonin Museum of Veps Ethnography
- Russian Museum of Ethnography, Saint Petersburg
- Tomskaya Pisanitsa Museum
- Ulan-Ude Ethnographic Museum

=== Serbia ===
- Ethnographic Museum, Belgrade

=== Slovenia ===
- Kajžnk House
- Liznjek Farm
- Workers' Barracks

=== Spain ===
- Black Pottery Museum
- Ethnographic Museum of Dairy
- Ethnographic Museum of Grandas de Salime
- Museum of Cádiz
- Museum of Jewellery in the Vía de la Plata
- Pontevedra Museum
- Valencian Museum of Ethnology
- Zaragoza Museum

=== Sweden ===
- Museum of Ethnography

=== Switzerland ===
- Ethnographic Museum of the University of Zurich
- Musée d'ethnographie de Genève, Geneva
- Musée d'ethnographie de Neuchâtel, Neuchâtel
- Museum of Cultures (Basel)
- North American Native Museum, Zurich

=== Tahiti ===
- Musée de Tahiti et des Îles, Punaauia

=== Turkey ===
- Adana Ethnography Museum
- Akşehir Museum
- Amasra Museum
- Ankara Ethnography Museum
- Ankara Vakıf Museum
- Amasya Museum
- Elazığ Archaeology and Ethnography Museum
- İzmir Ethnography Museum
- Kastamonu Ethnography Museum
- Konya Ethnography Museum
- Ordu Ethnographical Museum
- Sahip Ata Museum
- Tekirdağ Museum of Archaeology and Ethnography

=== Ukraine ===
- Museum of Folk Life (Mariupol)

=== United Kingdom ===
- Pitt Rivers Museum, Oxford, England
- Horniman Museum, London, England

=== United States ===
- Brigham Young University Museum of Peoples and Cultures
- Cheech Marin Center for Chicano Art, Culture & Industry, Riverside, California
- Fowler Museum at UCLA, California
- Haffenreffer Museum of Anthropology
- Oconaluftee Indian Village
- Old World Wisconsin
- Peabody Museum of Archaeology and Ethnology, Cambridge
- Peabody Museum of Salem
- Phoebe A. Hearst Museum of Anthropology, California
- Second Face Museum of Cultural Masks

=== Vietnam ===
- Vietnam Museum of Ethnology, Hanoi

== See also ==
- Museums § Ethnological and ethnographic
- Ethnography
- Category:Ethnographic museums
