= Treasures in the Walls Museum =

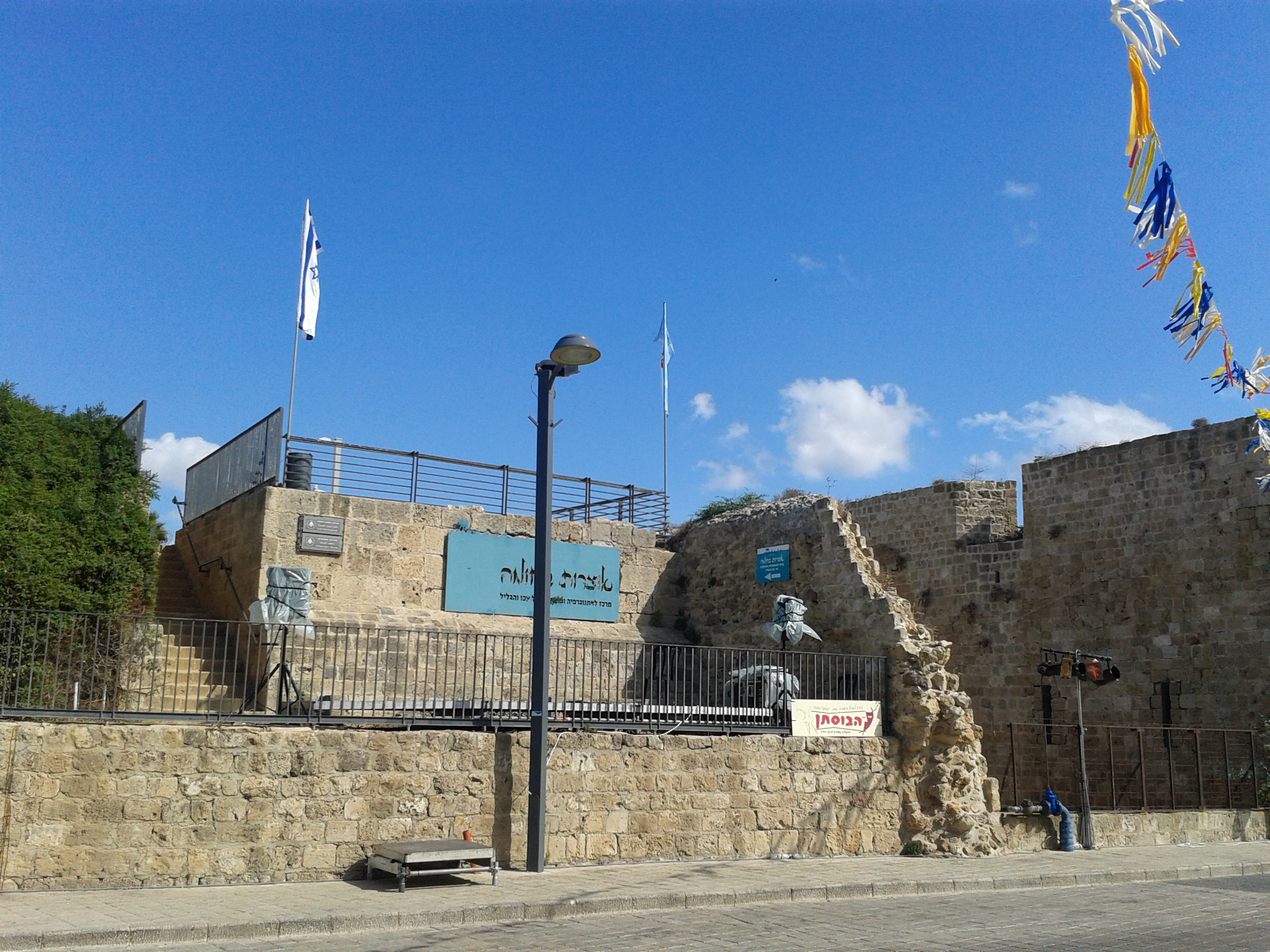
- Established: 2007
- Location: Acre Israel
- Coordinates: 32.924471°N 35.073290°E
- Type: Ethnographic museum
- Website: https://www.akko.org.il/attraction/the-ethnographic-museum/

The Treasures in the Walls Museum (Hebrew: מוזיאון אוצרות בחומה) is an ethnographic museum located in Acre, Israel. The museum is dedicated to show the craftsmanship of the city of Acre.

== History ==
The building was built by the Ottoman ruler of Jazzar Pasha, after Napoleon tried to conquer the city in 1779. The building was originally called Burj Al-Commander and was used as a military base for the Ottoman Empire. One of the reasons why the museum was established to conserve the collections Dan Hortman and Michael Lurie. The design of the presentation of the museum's exhibits was designed by Michal Mizrahi. The museum was inaugurated in 2007.

== Collections ==
The museum has exhibits on life in Galilee dating back to the 19th and 20th centuries. The museum contains artifacts such as local craftsmanship, clocks, vessels, furniture, works of art and books for children. During Hanukkah, the museum displays a collection of menorahs dating back to the 1930s. In 2015, the museum exhibited 40 Haggadot from the Mordechai collection. Some of the museum's books were collected by artist Mickey Einhorn-Nelkenbaum, as well as children's books from the Luria collection. The museum contains exhibits of objects such as handicrafts that were found in houses in Acre and Galilee from different communities in Israel.

== Gallery ==
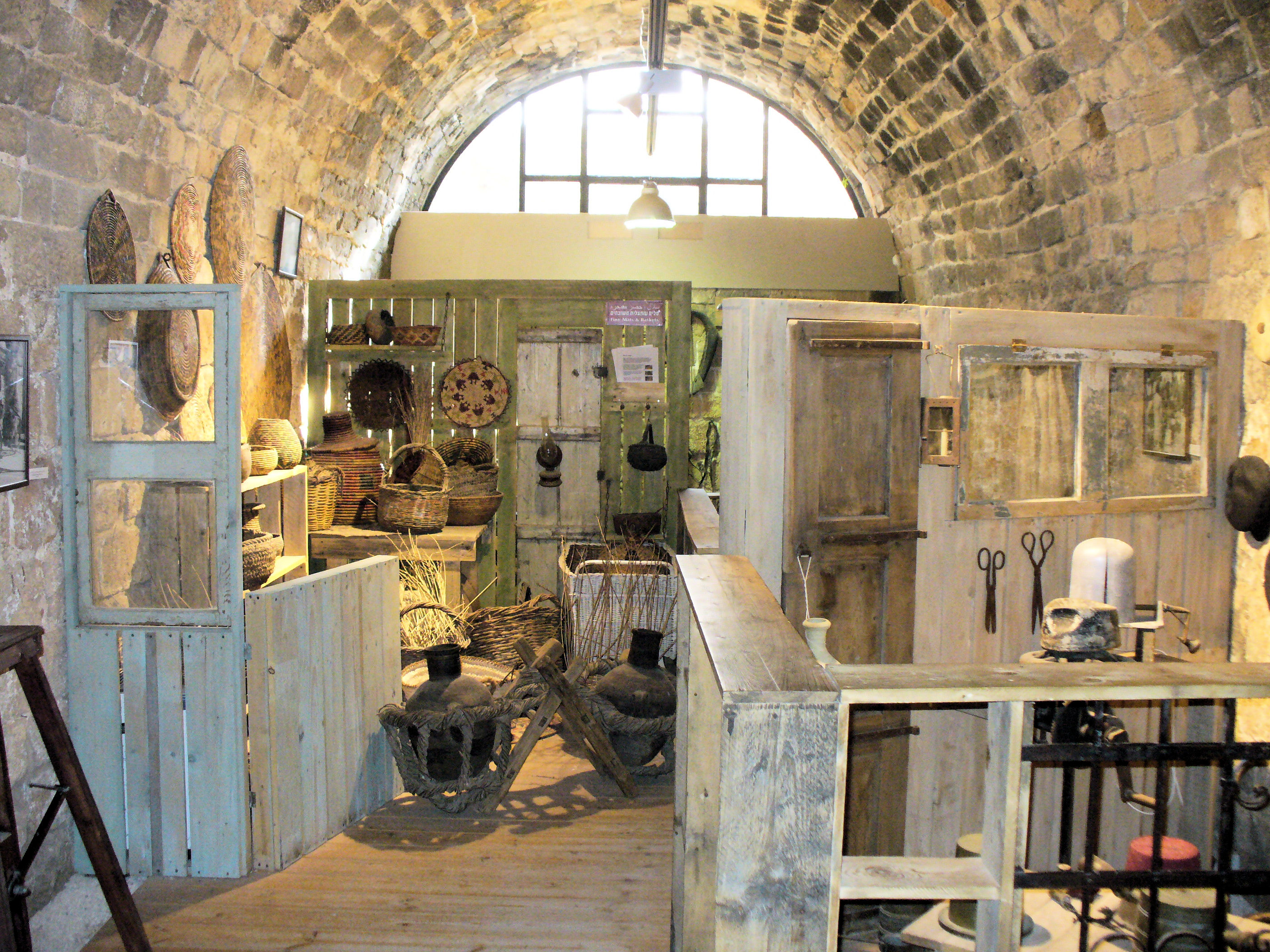

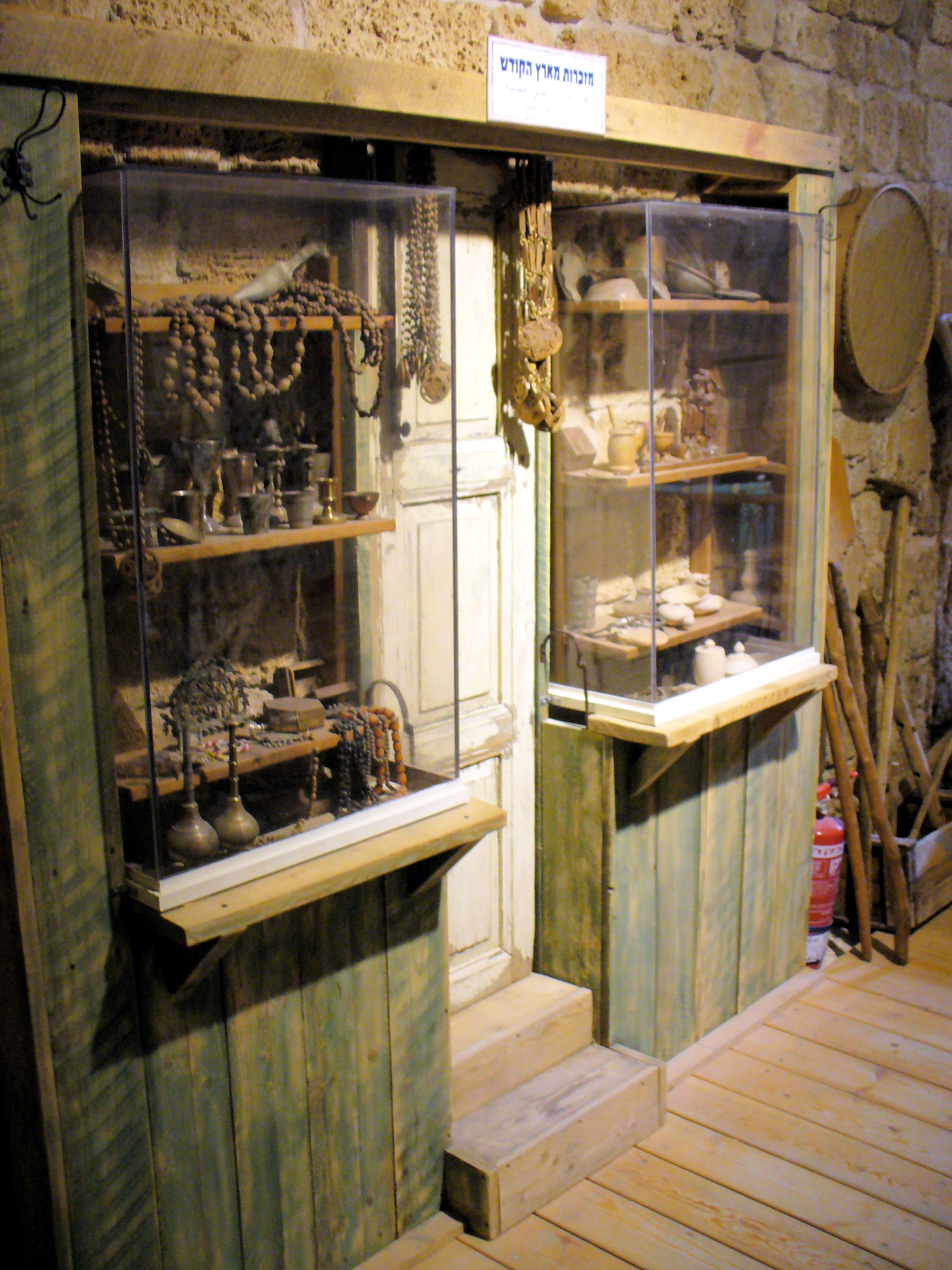

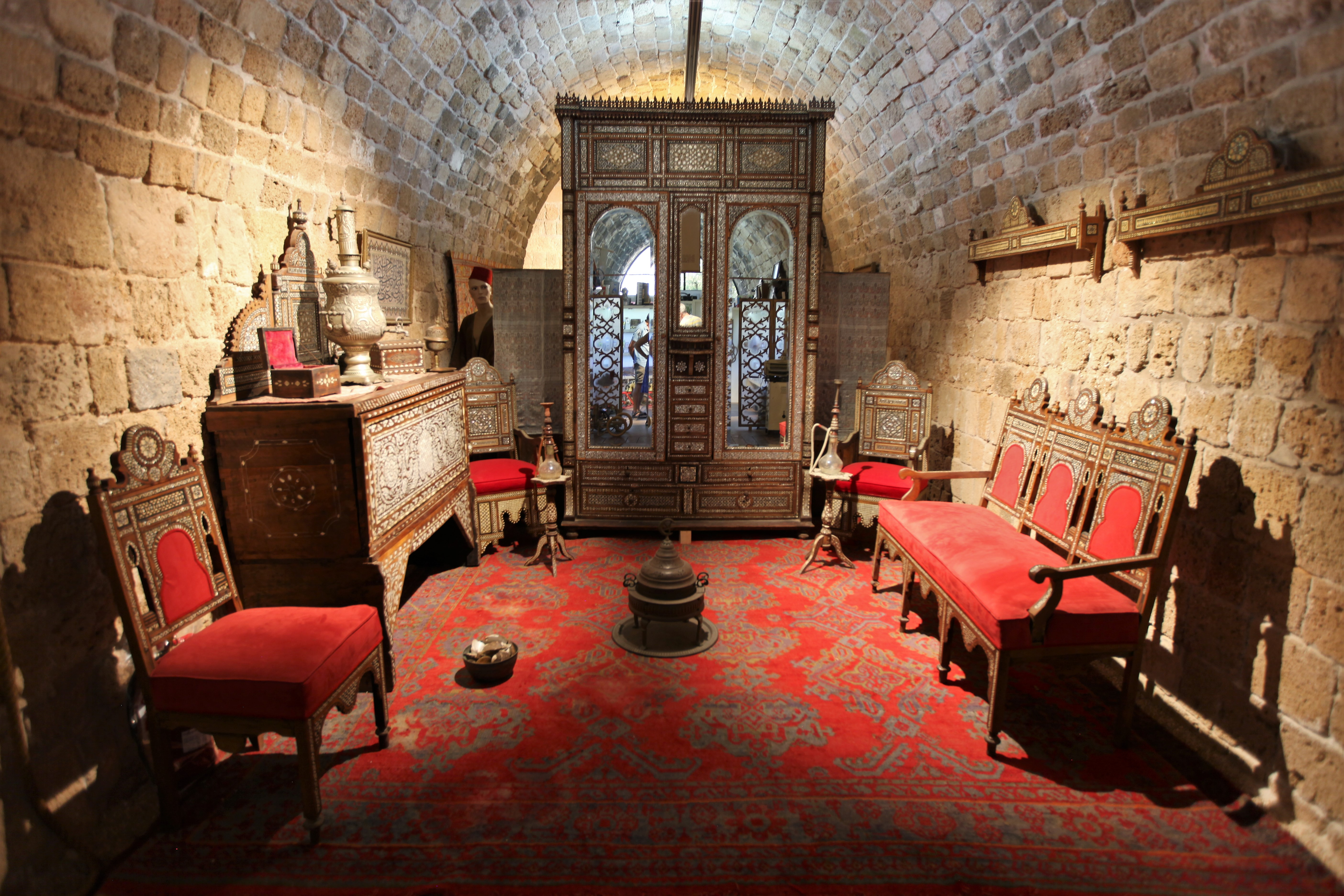

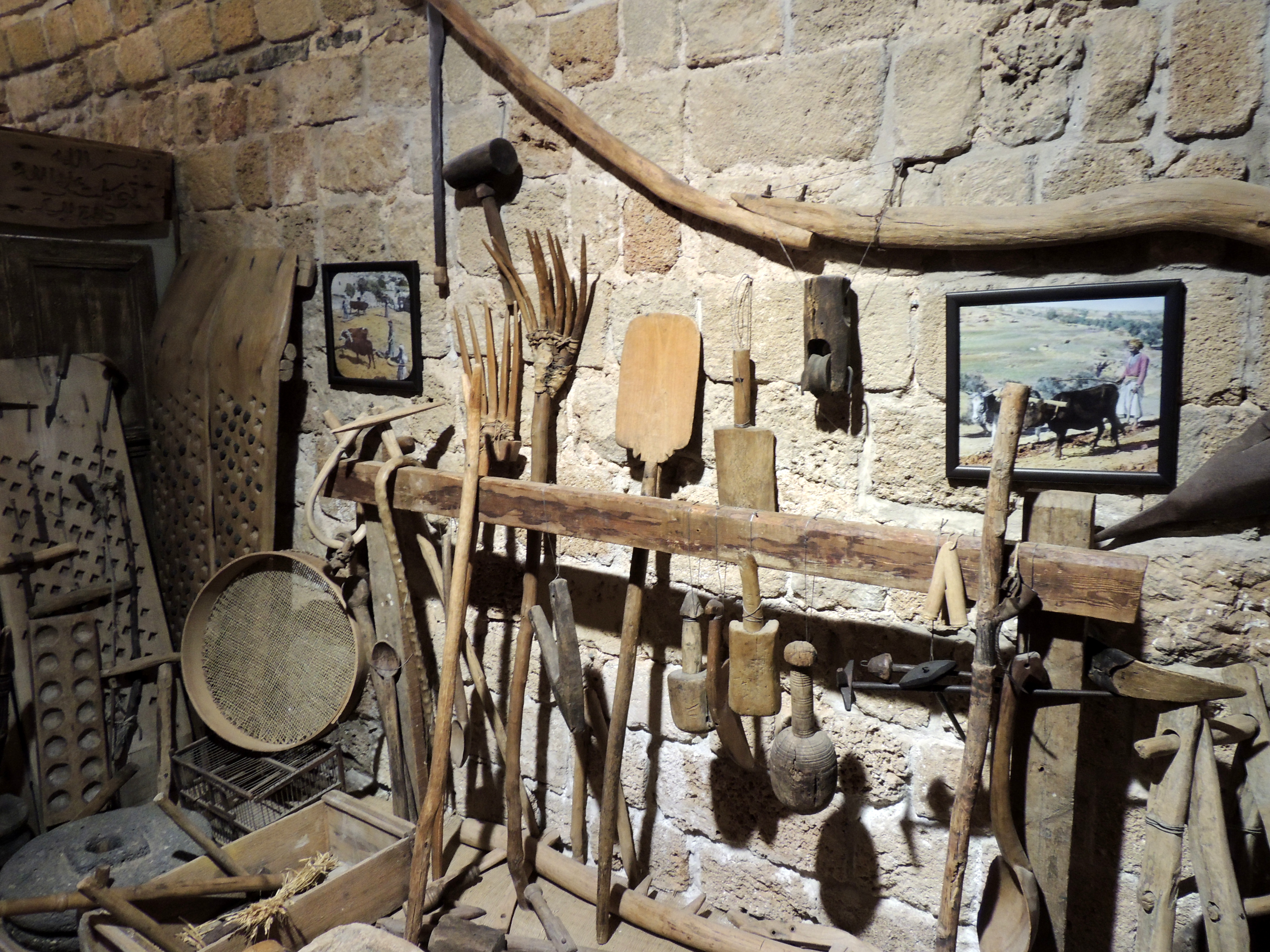
