= Ödemiş Urban Archives and Museum =

Museum and archive in İzmir Province, Turkey

Coordinates: 38°13′37″N 27°58′11″E

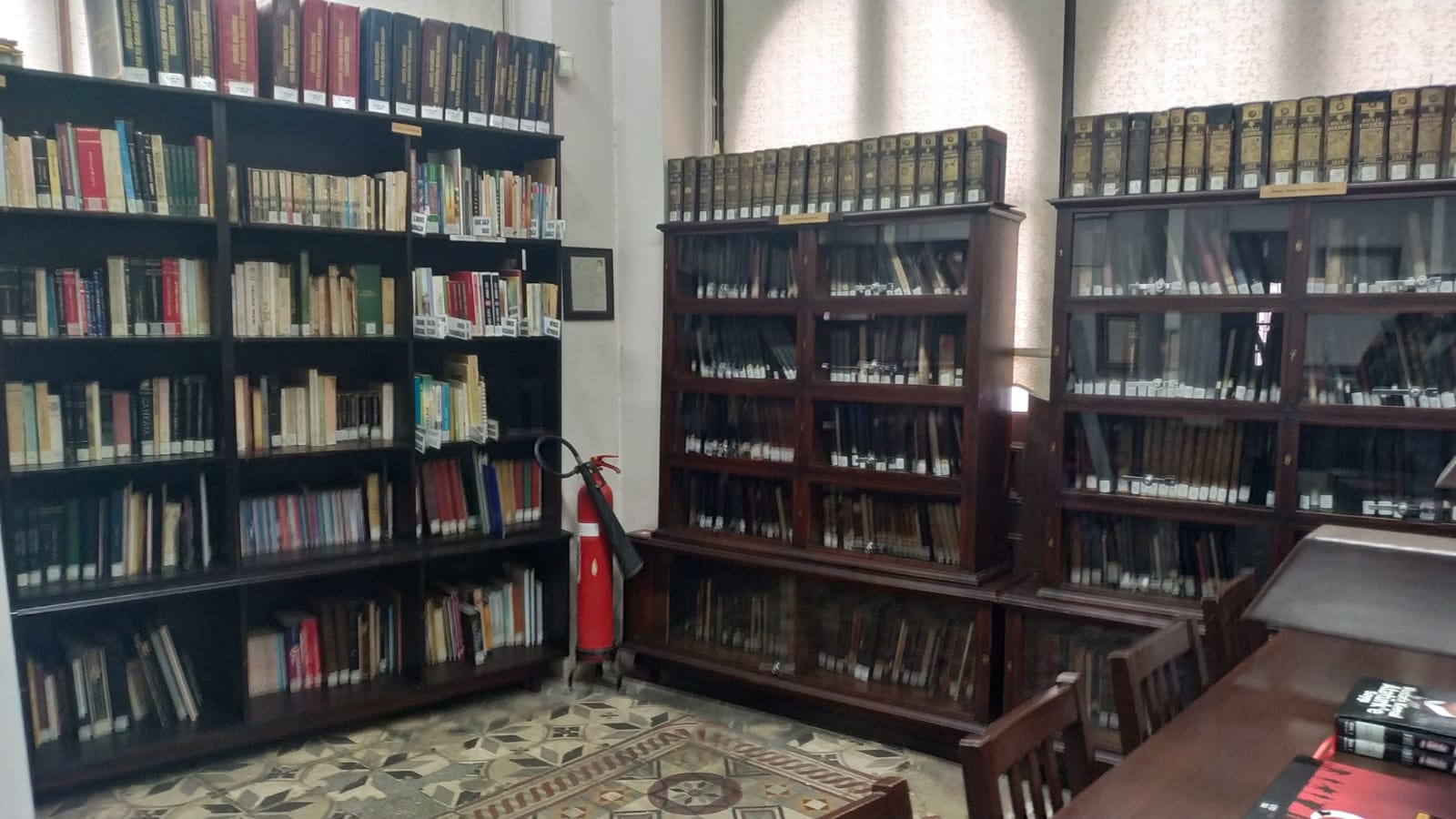
Museum Library

Ödemiş Urban Archives and Museum (Ödemiş Yıldız Kent Arşivi ve Müzesi, ÖYKAM for short) is an ethnographic museum in Ödemiş, İzmir Province, Turkey.

The museum building is a former hotel named Yıldız ("star") which was opened in 1927. In 2006 the municipality of Ödemiş bought the hotel and after a renovation project it was opened as a museum in 2012.

The museum hosts 6218 ethnographical items as well as 20815 documents and 3619 books. There are 14 rooms in the museum. Some rooms are reserved for famous Ödemiş people such as Şükrü Saracoğlu (former prime minister in the 13th and 14th governments of Turkey), Doctor Mustafa Bengisu (former mayor and MP) and Alev Coşkun (politician and journalist). Other rooms are so called brides'room, watchmakers' room, barbers' room, tobacco room, hotel room, history room, kitchen etc.
