= Madonna of the Cherry =

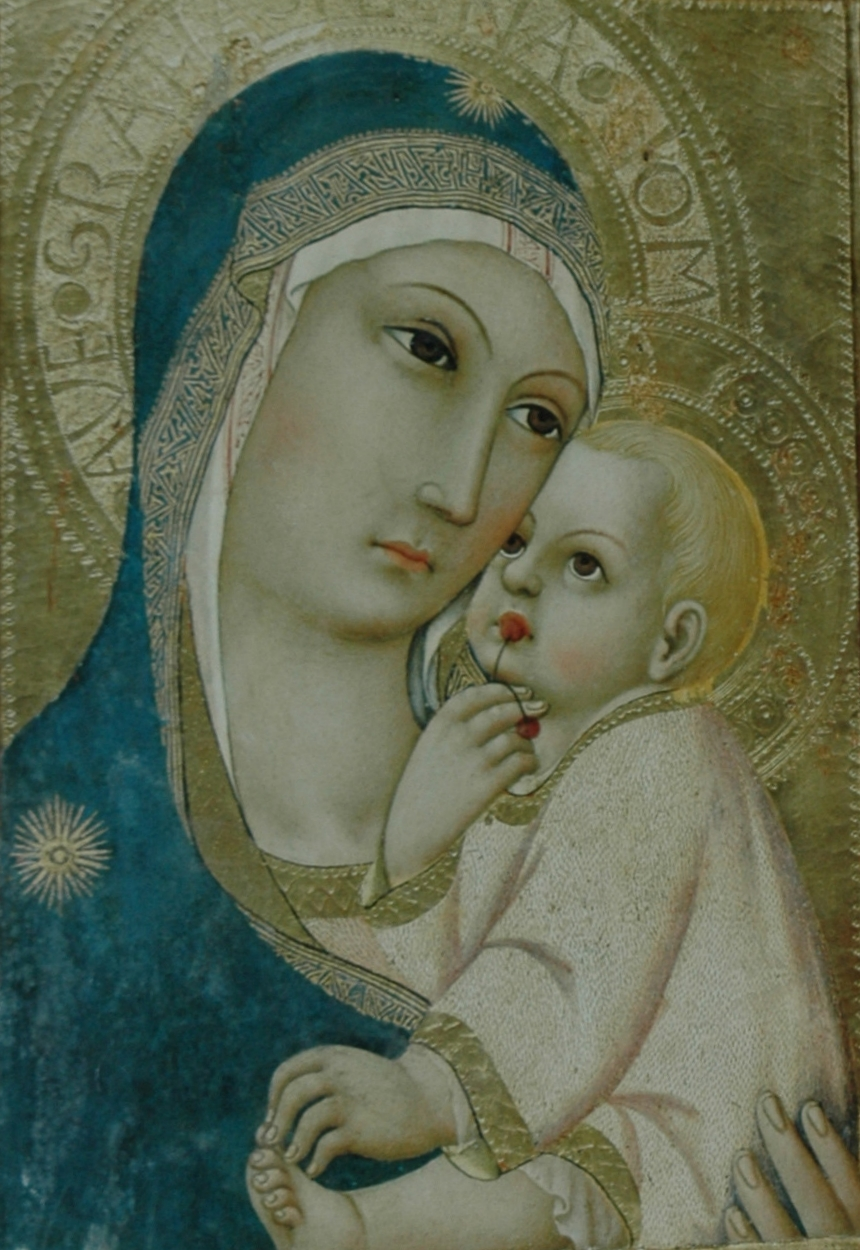

The Madonna of the Cherry (French - La Vierge à la cerise) is a 1445 tempera and gold on panel painting by Sano di Pietro, now in the Fort Charlet in Calvi on Corsica. The cherry is a symbol of paradise, with its red colour evoking Christ's future passion.

It probably originally formed part of a triptych and came from the monastery of Valle-d'Alesani in Piazzali, where it is mentioned as being in 1587. A copy is placed on its original location for most of the year, with the original usually held at the Departmental Museum of archaeology Gilort (Jérôme) Carcopino, apart from its return to the monastery itself every 8th September (the feast of the Nativity of Mary).

== External links (in French) ==
- Article du Point du 29-07-2004
- Article de Corse-Matin du 19-11-2009
