= Carcopino =

Carcopino may refer to

- Sarrola-Carcopino, a commune on the island of Corsica in France
- Departmental Museum of archaeology Gilort (Jérôme) Carcopino in Corsica
- Jérôme Carcopino (1881–1970), French historian and author
