= Museum Maluku =

Coordinates: 52°05′12.7″N 04°18′23.08″E

- Moluks Historisch Museum
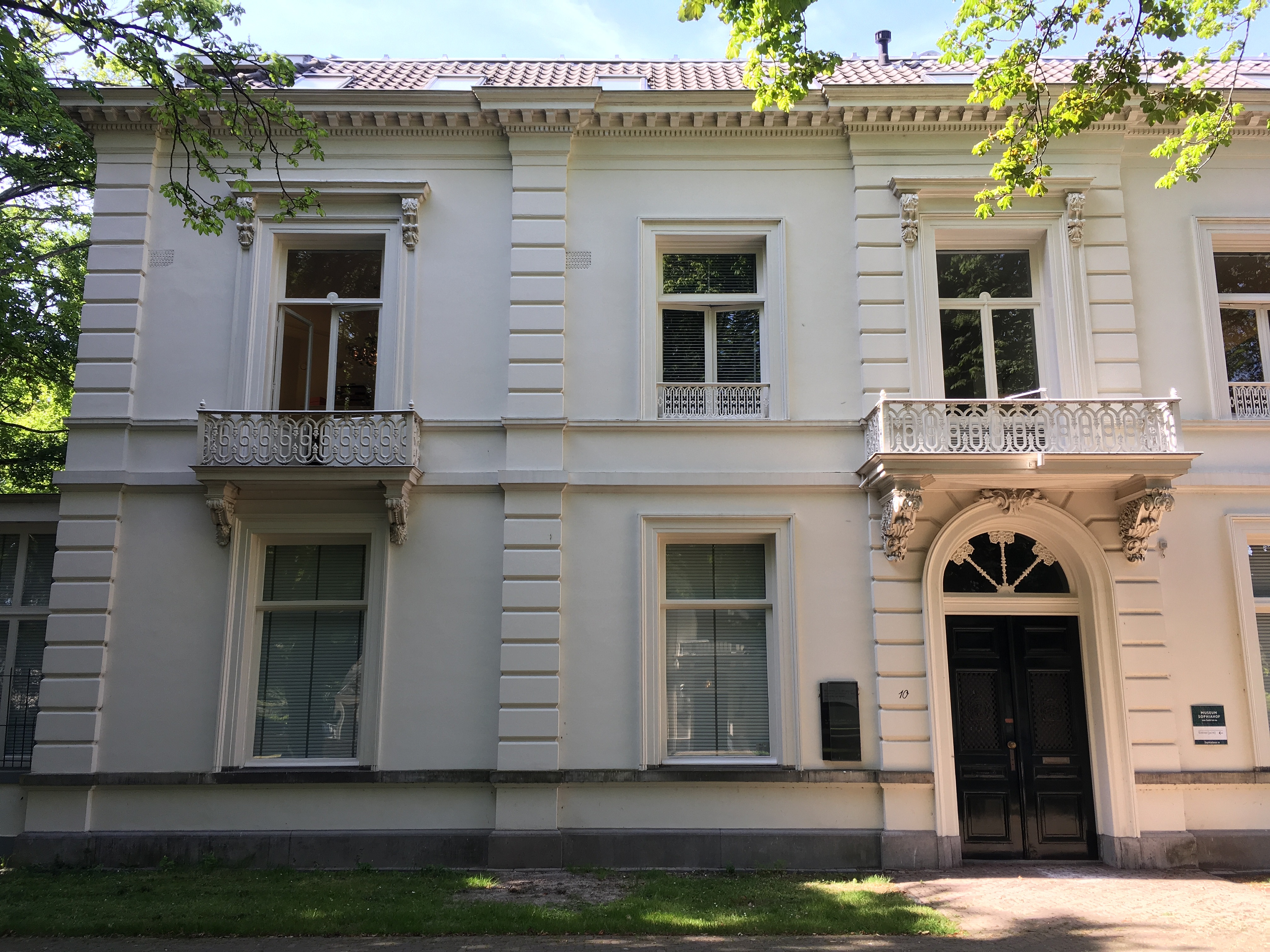
- Sophialaan 10, The Hague
- Established: 1990, re-established 2019
- Location: The Hague, Netherlands
- Type: Ethnographic museum
- Website: Museum Maluku

Museum Maluku, also known by the abbreviation MuMa, is a museum dedicated to the Maluku Islands and Moluccan people living in the Netherlands. Museum Maluku was located in the city of Utrecht until October 2012, when it closed its doors due to inadequate financial means. Its Moluccan heritage collection was preserved and managed by the Moluccan Historical Museum Foundation, allowing it to remain accessible in various ways. After temporary accommodation in the Moluccan Church Center in Houten, the collection was relocated to the Sophiahof Museum in The Hague in December 2017. Museum Maluku reopened on June 27, 2019.

== History ==
=== Moluccans in the Netherlands ===
Approximately 12,500 Moluccans arrived in the Netherlands on a temporary basis in 1951, following the end of Dutch colonial rule in Indonesia. Though initially meant to be temporary residents, the Dutch government began regarding the Moluccans as permanent residents of the country in 1956, and began promoting integration within Dutch society. The Moluccans were prevented from returning to Maluku in Indonesia for social and economic reasons until the 1980s.

=== Museum Maluku ===
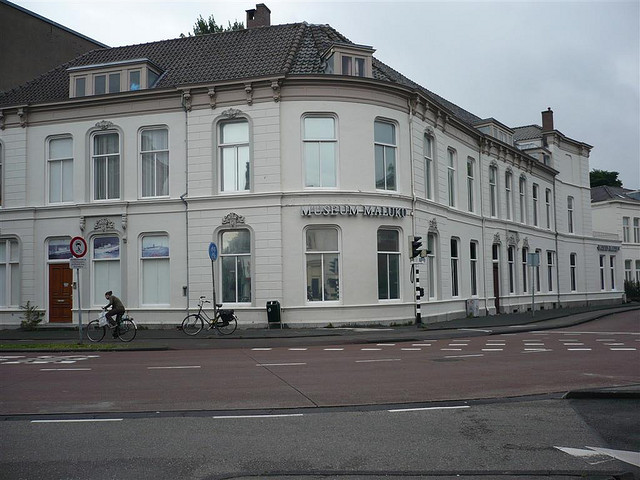
Former museum building in Utrecht.

Museum Maluku logo.

In 1986, the Dutch government announced its intention to open a museum as a gift to the Moluccan community in the Netherlands. In a statement released by both the Dutch government and the Badan Persatuan (Moluccan Unitary Movement), which jointly developed the new institution, the museum was described as a "living monument', providing an image 'of the history of the Moluccan community, which may also serve to stimulate the contemporary development of Moluccan art and culture in the Netherlands." The joint press release announcing the future museum for the Moluccan community was released on April 21, 1986.

The Museum Maluku, or Moluks Historisch Museum (Moluccan Historical Museum), as it was first called, was opened to the public in Utrecht in November 1990. It transitioned into a private foundation in 1995.

In addition to the permanent collection, the Museum Maluku houses temporary exhibitions and an auditorium which can seat eighty people. The museum also includes an educational research center and a small cafe featuring Moluccan cuisine.

=== Museum partnerships ===
The Museum Maluku has partnered with numerous Dutch, Indonesian and American organisations to establish exhibitions and cultural exchanges. Its Dutch collaborators continue to include the Dutch government and the various Moluccan organizations within the country. The museum has also partnered with other Dutch cultural institutions including the Rijksmuseum Amsterdam, the Dutch Museum Association, Centraal Museum in Utrecht, Aboriginal Art Museum in Utrecht, the Royal Tropical Institute (KIT), Bronbeek and the Friends of Papua Heritage Foundation (PACE).

The museum's Indonesian partners include the government of Maluku province, the Museum Siwa Lima in Ambon, Erasmus Huis in Jakarta, ethnic Moluccan diplomats, the Embassy of the Netherlands to Indonesia and the Rinamakana Foundation of Ambon. The Museum Maluku launched a partnership beginning in August 2009 with the World of Maluku (WOM), a magazine published in Jakarta and edited by Samuel Wattimena. Under the collaboration, the Museum Maluku is the distributor and main correspondent of the World of Maluku magazine in the Netherlands. The museum is also in talks with Erasmus Huis in Jakarta to launch a yearly Moluccan market to serve the Moluccan community residing in Indonesia's capital city.

Museum Maluku has also worked with the Smithsonian Institution in Washington, D.C. It is working to partner with Moluccan diaspora communities in the U.S. state of California, as well as Australia.
