= Ethnographic Museum of Berat =

- Muzeu Etnografik i Beratit
- Official logo

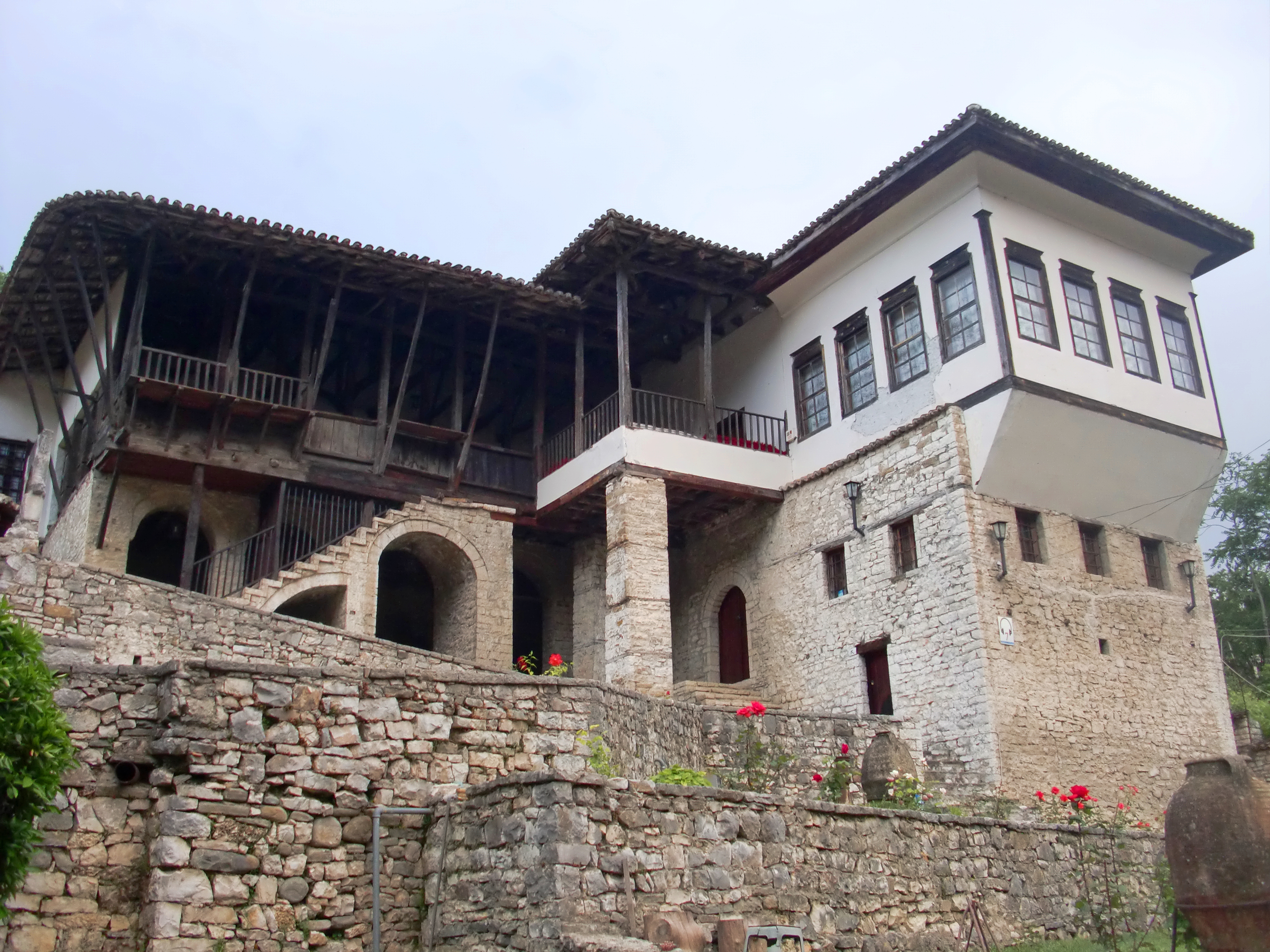
- Image of National Ethnographic Museum of Berat
- Established: 1979; 47 years ago
- Location: Berat, Albania
- Coordinates: 40.7076°N 19.9504°E
- Type: Ethnographic Museum
- Website: muzeumet-berat.al

The Ethnographic Museum of Berat (Albanian: Muzeu Etnografik i Beratit) is an ethnographic museum in Berat, Albania. It opened in 1979 and contains a range of everyday objects from throughout Berat's history. The museum contains original furniture and a number of household objects, wooden cases, wall-closets, as well as chimneys and a well. Near the well is an olive press, wool press and many large ceramic dishes, from the historical domestic culture of Berat's citizens. The ground floor has a hall with a model of a medieval street with traditional shops on both sides and on the second floor has an archive, loom, village sitting room, kitchen and sitting room.
