= Tetouan Ethnographic Museum =

- متحف تطوان الإثنوغرافي
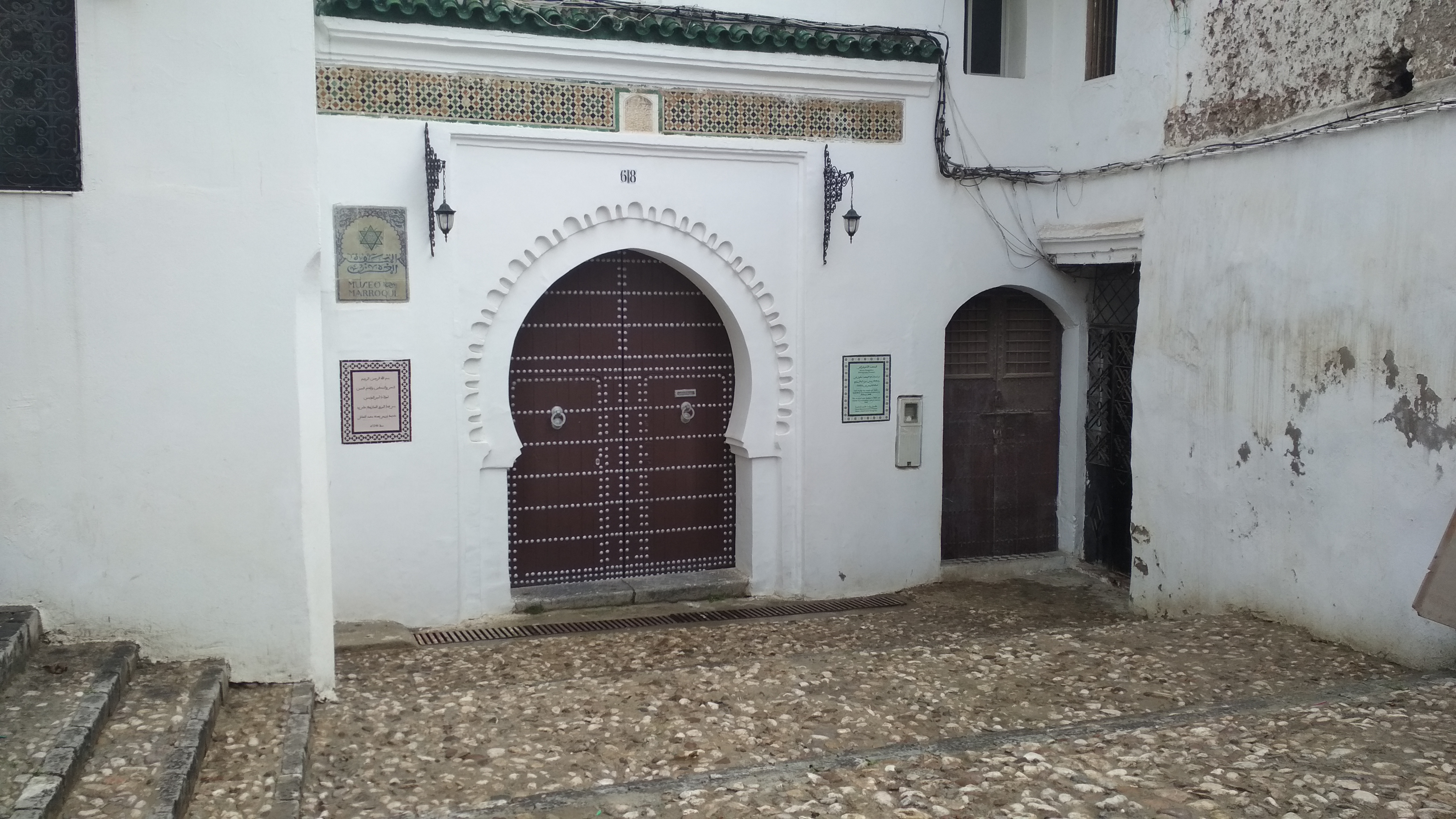
- View from outside
- Established: 1948; 78 years ago
- Location: 68, Rue Sqala, Bab El Oqla, Tétouan, Morocco
- Coordinates: 35.5703°N 5.3640°W
- Type: Ethnographic Museum
- Website: fnm.ma/musees-ouverts/musee-bab-el-oqla-tetouan/

The Tetouan Ethnographic Museum or Bab El Oqla Museum is an ethnographic museum located east of the old medina of Tétouan in Morocco, and is named after one of the seven historic gates of the city.

== Foundation and history ==
Founded in 1928, this museum was first known as the "Muslim home" or "Museum of Indigenous Arts" and was headquartered in the Bennouna house in the heart of the Medina. Later on, it was transferred to one of the bastions of the Tetouan enclosure, in Bab el Oqla and inaugurated on July 29, 1948. It is a historic fortress built on the orders of the Alaouite Sultan Moulay Abd al-Rahman around 1830.

In January 2022, the National Museum Foundation re-opened the museum after months of renovation and maintenance.

== Museum content ==
The museum is divided into 3 sections; the first deals with the geographical and historical presentation of Tetouan since its reconstruction in the 15th century until the Spanish presence, then the contemporary era (19th and 20th centuries). It also covers its golden age and prosperity from the 16th and early 17th centuries as well as its decline in the 18th century.

The second section is an immersion in the urban organization of the old city and its various architectural elements. It also presents the 'Squndo', a 15th-century water distribution system that runs through the medina, as well as various architectural components, such as carved and painted wood, zellij, tombstones and doors.

The third section is dedicated to the arts and crafts of the old city of Tetouan, presenting a rich collection of ancient objects such as caftans, jewelry and instruments.

== Gallery ==
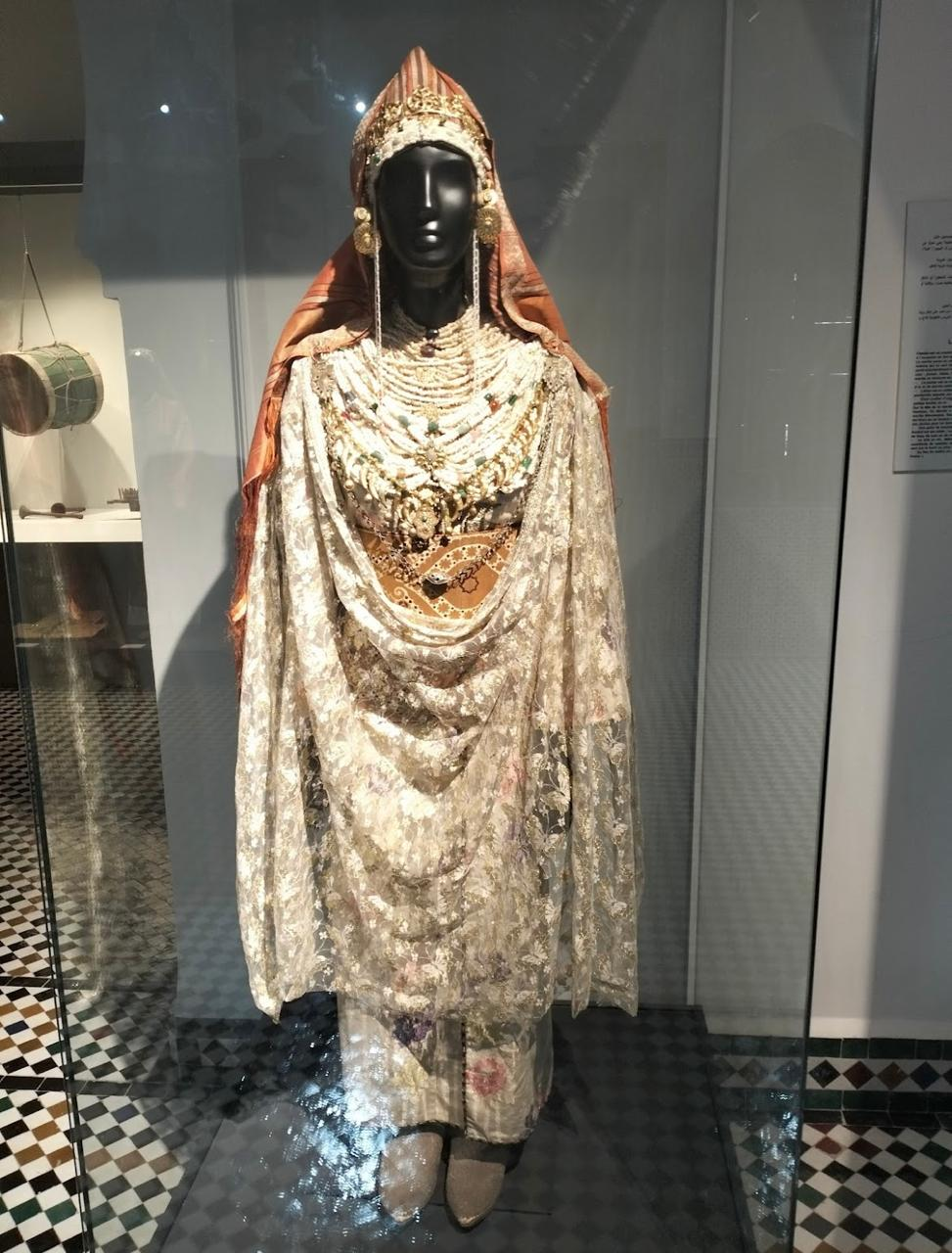
The Chedda of Tetouan is a traditional Moroccan costume composed of jewelry and a caftan known locally as "El Bahja", exhibited at the Bab al Oqla Museum

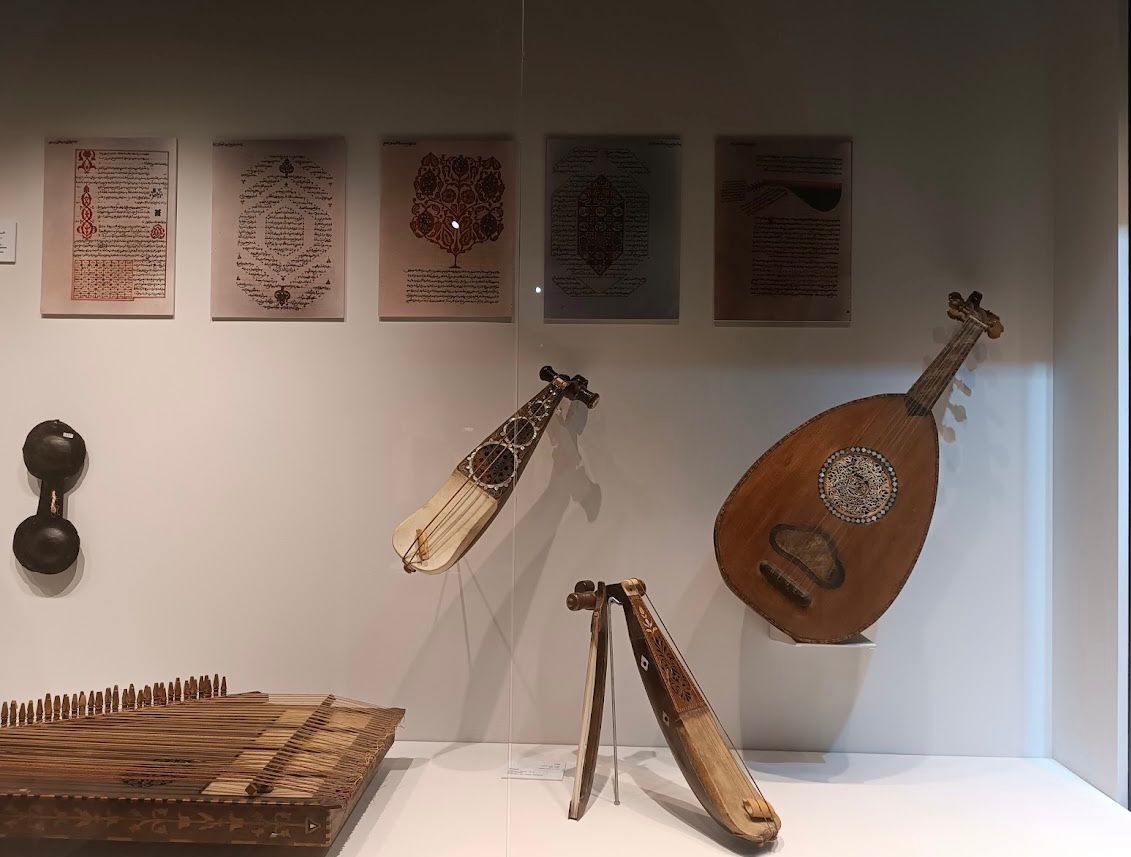
Old musical instruments from the 19th century used in musical festivals in Tetouan.

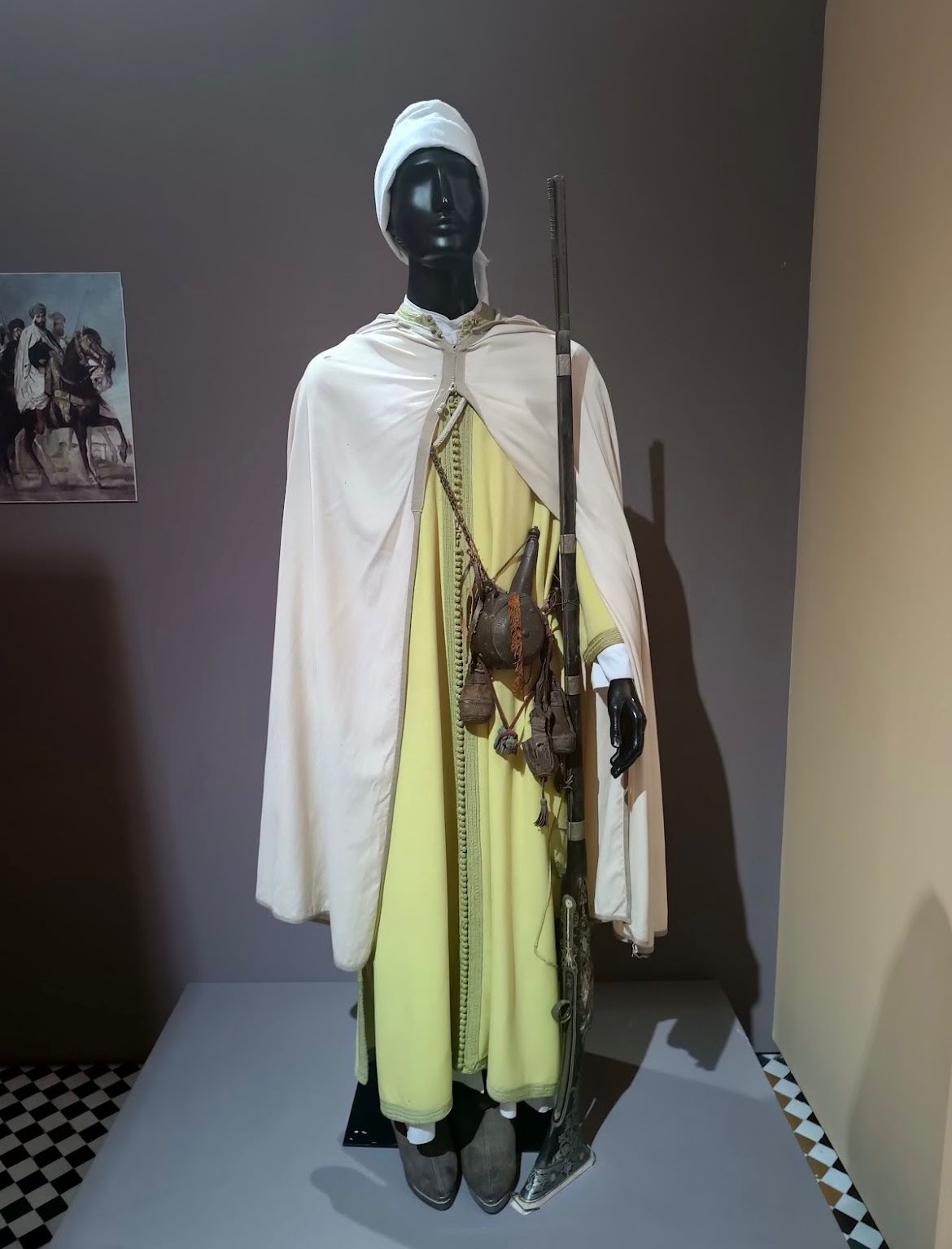
Moroccan djellaba with selham mekhzani from the 19th century.

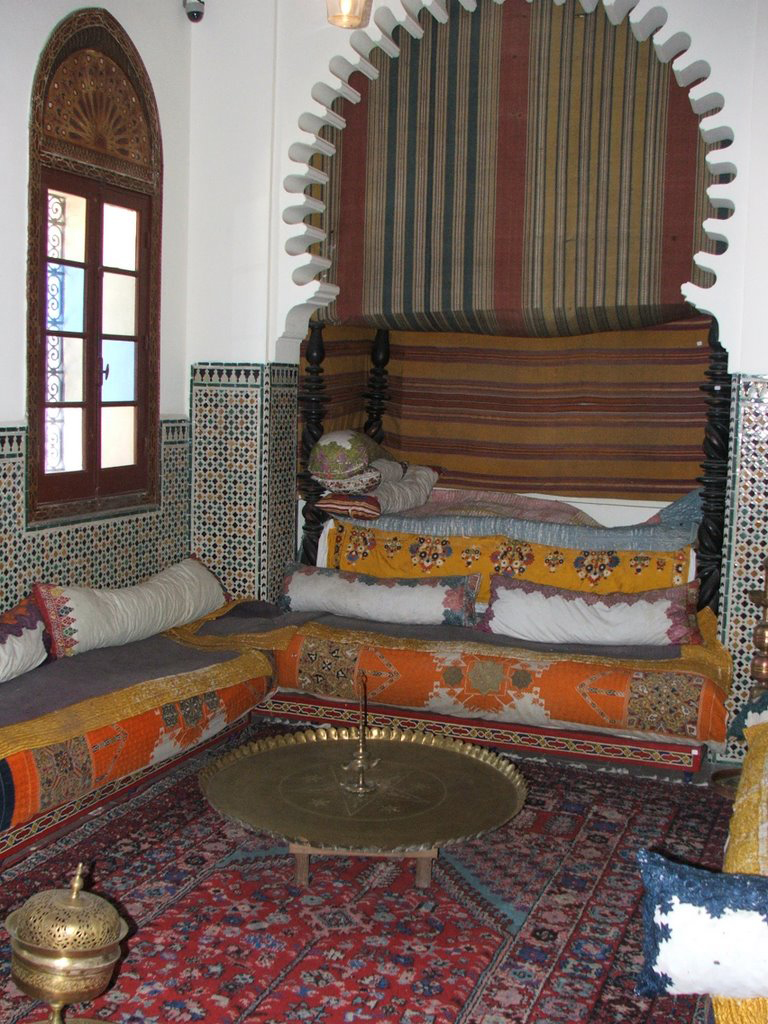

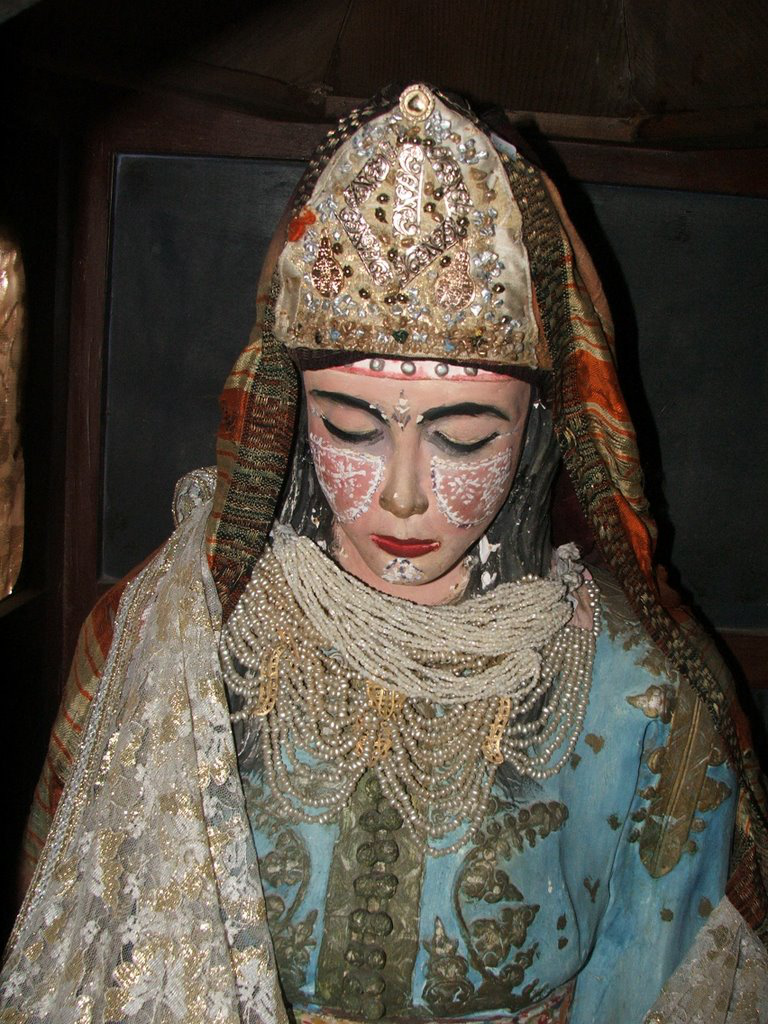
