= Ethnographic Museum, Pyrsogianni =

Museum in Pyrsogianni, Greece

The Ethnographic Museum of Pyrsogianni is a museum in the village Pyrsogianni, in the Mastorochoria area, in the Ioannina regional unit, Greece. It focuses on traditional stone masonry, and displays photographs, drawings, plans and tools.
