= West Kalimantan Provincial Museum =

Museum in Pontianak, West Kalimantan, Indonesia

Coordinates: 0°2′54.1″S 109°20′35.1″E

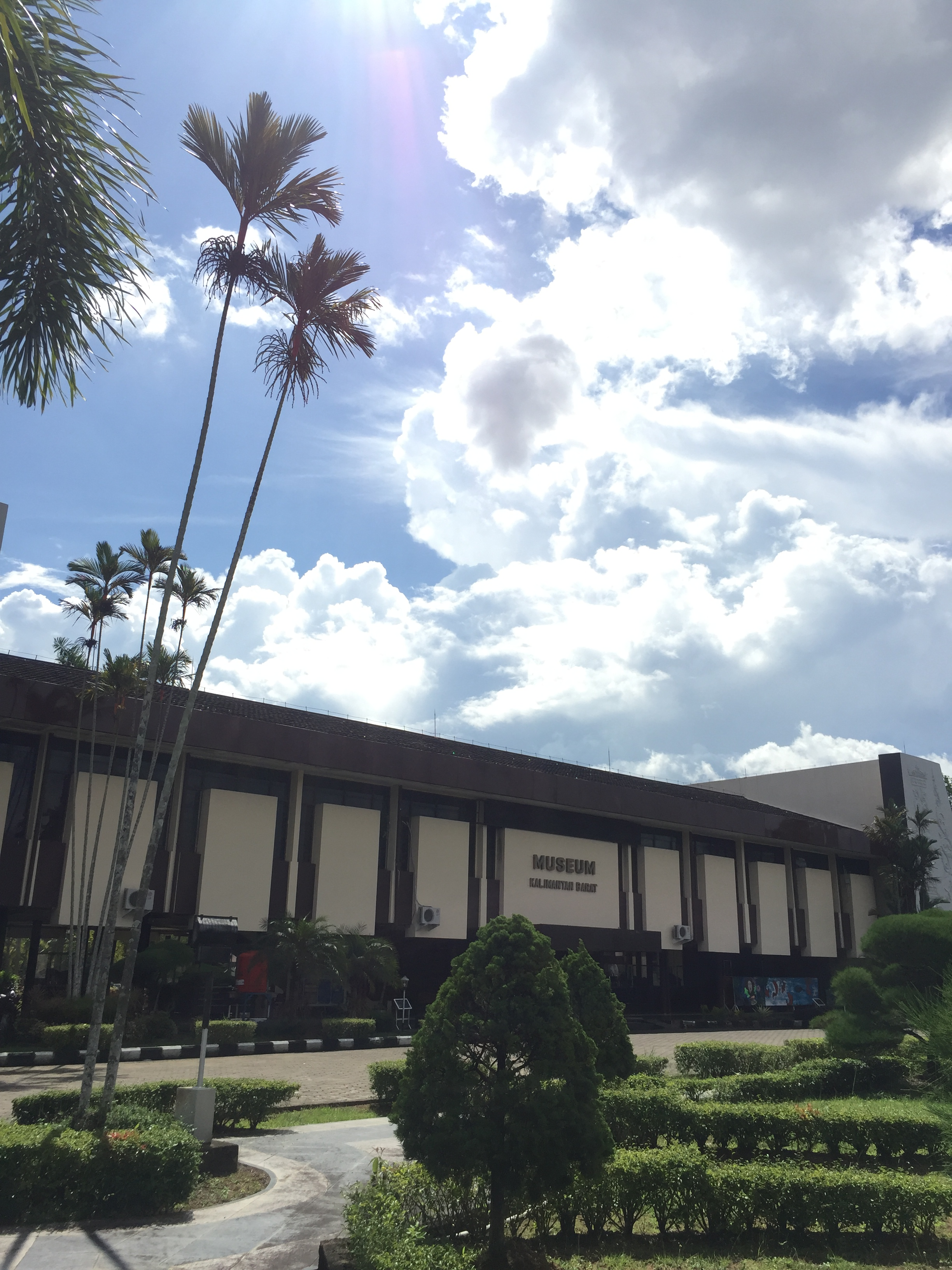
West Kalimantan Provincial Museum.

West Kalimantan Provincial Museum (Languages of Indonesia: Museum Provinsi Kalimantan Barat) is a museum in Pontianak, West Kalimantan, Indonesia, near Tanjungpura University.

The concrete reliefs on the museum's exterior depict the lifestyles of Kalbar's two largest ethnic minorities: Malay and Dayak. The museum contains a number of important Dayak artifacts such as tribal clothing and handicrafts and is known for its 16th century tempayan (water jugs) from Thailand, China and Borneo. There is a replica of a Dayak longboat around the corner from the museum.
