= Elazığ Archaeology and Ethnography Museum =

Museum in Elazığ, Turkey

- Elazığ Arkeoloji Müzesi
- Elazığ Archaeology and Ethnography Museum
- Established: 1982; 44 years ago
- Location: Fırat Üniversitesi Kampüsü, Elazığ, Turkey
- Type: Archaeology, Ethnography
- Collections: Paleolithic, Neolithic, Chalcolithic, Bronze( Hittites, Hurrians) Iron, Urartu, Hellenistic, Roman, Byzantine, Seljukids and Ottoman
- Collection size: 29013
- Owner: Ministry of Culture and Tourism

Elazığ Archaeology and Ethnography Museum is a museum in Elazığ, Turkey

The museum is situated in the campus of Fırat University at 38°40′23″N 39°11′26″E.

In 1965 a museum was established in a historical building in Harput, a former settlement 5 kilometres (3.1 mi) to the east of Elazığ. During the construction of two hydro electric plants; Keban Dam and Karakaya Dam both of which are on Fırat River (Euphrates of the antiquity) and quite close to Elazığ, many items worthy of museum were found. With these finds a new museum was established in the university campus . It was opened on 28 July 1982.

The closed area of the museum is 5,185 square metres (55,810 sq ft). There are two exhibition halls and a gallery; archaeology and coin section (1,070 square metres (11,500 sq ft)), ethnographical section (392 square metres (4,220 sq ft)) carpet and rug gallery (763 square metres (8,210 sq ft)). There are also 12 office rooms, a laboratory and a conference hall.

The items are from Paleolithic, Neolithic, Chalcolithic, Bronze (Hittites, Hurrians) Iron, Urartu, Hellenistic, Roman, Byzantine, Seljukids and Ottoman ages. Also in the yard there are tombstones from Tunceli Province.
