= Museum of Jewellery in the Vía de la Plata =

Museum in La Bañeza, Castile and León, Spain

- Museo de las Alhajas en la Vía de la Plata
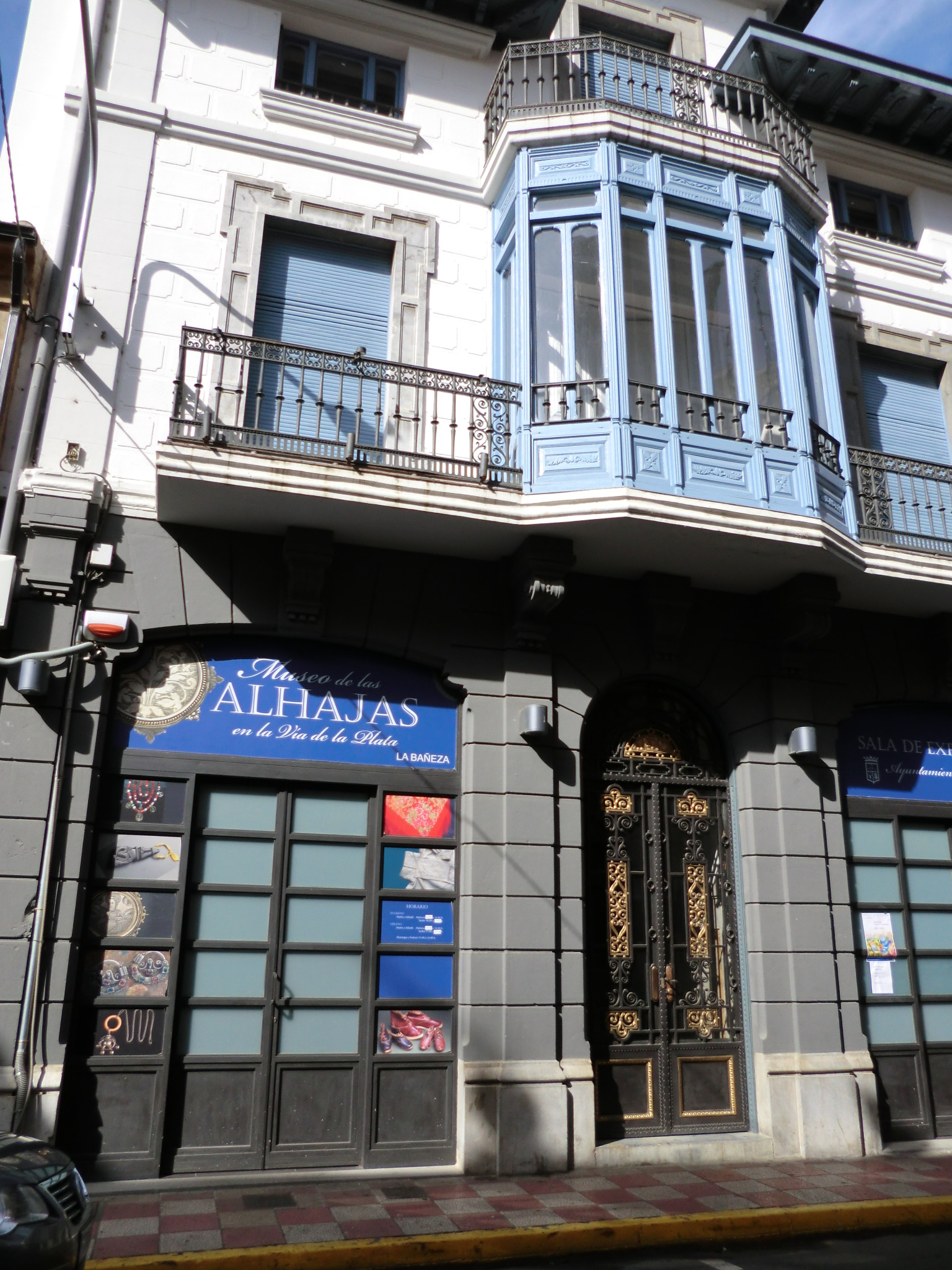
- Established: 2011
- Location: Calle Juan de Mansilla, 10; La Bañeza, León; Spain
- Coordinates: 42°17′57″N 5°53′48″W
- Website: www.museoalhajas.es

The Museum of Jewellery in the Vía de la Plata (Alhajas en la Vía de la Plata in Spanish) is located in the center of the town of La Bañeza (Province of León, Castile and León, Spain), close to Plaza Mayor, in a modernist building of the beginning of the 20th century, best known as the 'Casa de doña Josefina'.

== History ==
Its creation is the result of an agreement signed between the Carvajal-Cavero family, owner of the collection, and the Town Hall of La Bañeza. This collection, assembled during more than four decades, is composed of over 3,000 pieces of jewellery (from the 16th to the 18th century) and traditional Spanish clothing (19th century), especially of the Vía de la Plata and the Province of León. It was inaugurated on March 25, 2011.

At the beginning of February 2012 the Museum reached 5,000 visitors, and on June 30, July 1 and 2 of that year was the site of the First European Congress of Jewellery.

== Exhibition ==
The Museum of Jewellery, which permanent exhibition is renewed every year, consists of seven rooms:.
