= Museum of Cretan Ethnology =

Coordinates: 35.0678°N 24.8151°E

- Established: 1973
- Location: Voroi, Crete (Greece)
- Type: Folklore museum
- Website: Official website

The Museum of Cretan Ethnology is a museum in Voroi, in the municipal unit of Faistos, Heraklion regional unit, southern Crete, Greece. Established as an institution in 1973, the museum was built under the French architect Georges Henri Rivière, the creator of the Musée National des Arts et Traditions Populaires of Paris, between 1977 and 1982 under sponsorship of the Greek Ministry of Culture and opened formally in 1988. However, it has been an important centre of research since 1980 in studying the civilizations of Crete from 1000 to the present day. The museum contains artifacts found all over Crete from the Minoan period (2000–1000 BC), the Archaic (1000–500 BC) and Byzantine, although a significant part of the collection is from the period of Turkish occupation. The museum is particularly rich in items related to agriculture, stock breeding, pottery, basketry, wood carving, architecture and music and dancing.

== History ==
The Museum of Cretan Ethnology was established institutionally in 1973 as an initiative of the Mesara Cultural Association. Between 1973 and 1981, it focused on mainly planning the museum and research centre and after obtaining sponsorship from the Greek Ministry of Culture it was constructed between 1977 and 1981. During this period the members of the museum conducted primary ethnological and ecological research throughout rural Crete, and collects many items. Between 1982 and 1991, large-scale research was conducted and educational programmes put into practice, financed mainly by the European Central Fund. In 1988 it formally opened as a museum with its first exhibits. In 1992, the museum won the European Museum of the Year Award (ΕΜΥΑ) from the Council of Europe and the Mesara Cultural association registered the museum as a National Charity with the Ministry of Finance.

In 2001, a European Union and Greek Ministry of Culture financed 2,800 square metre complex was added to coexist alongside the main museum building. It was dedicated to the research of Creten Ethnology and to accommodate educational and conference activities.

Given its reliance on donors, since 2003 the museum has encountered some organization and financial difficulties given the costs of the research and publishing its findings but as of 2010 is still running.

== Exhibits ==
The museum displays are divided into seven different ethnological sections related to human beings’ biological need to survive and adapt. These are structured as follows:

1. Food – Exhibits related to diet, agricultural tools, cooking vessels etc.
2. Architecture – Example of Cretan architecture and the fusion of Byzantine and Venetian influences.
3. Handicrafts – Exhibits include a loom room, tools for preparing raw materials, cloths, blankets and covers.
4. Production and trade -Exhibits include items of basketry, pottery, metalworking and contains a traditional Cretan shoemaker's work bench and tools, a threshing sledge and hand mill.
5. Transportation -Exhibits related to travel in Crete including items used to carry goods.
6. Customs and traditions – Exhibits reveal much about the moral code and practice of the Cretan people with items such as sacerdotal vestments, ecclesiastical objects, musical instruments and weapons.
7. Social organization -Exhibits related to Cretian society and governance.
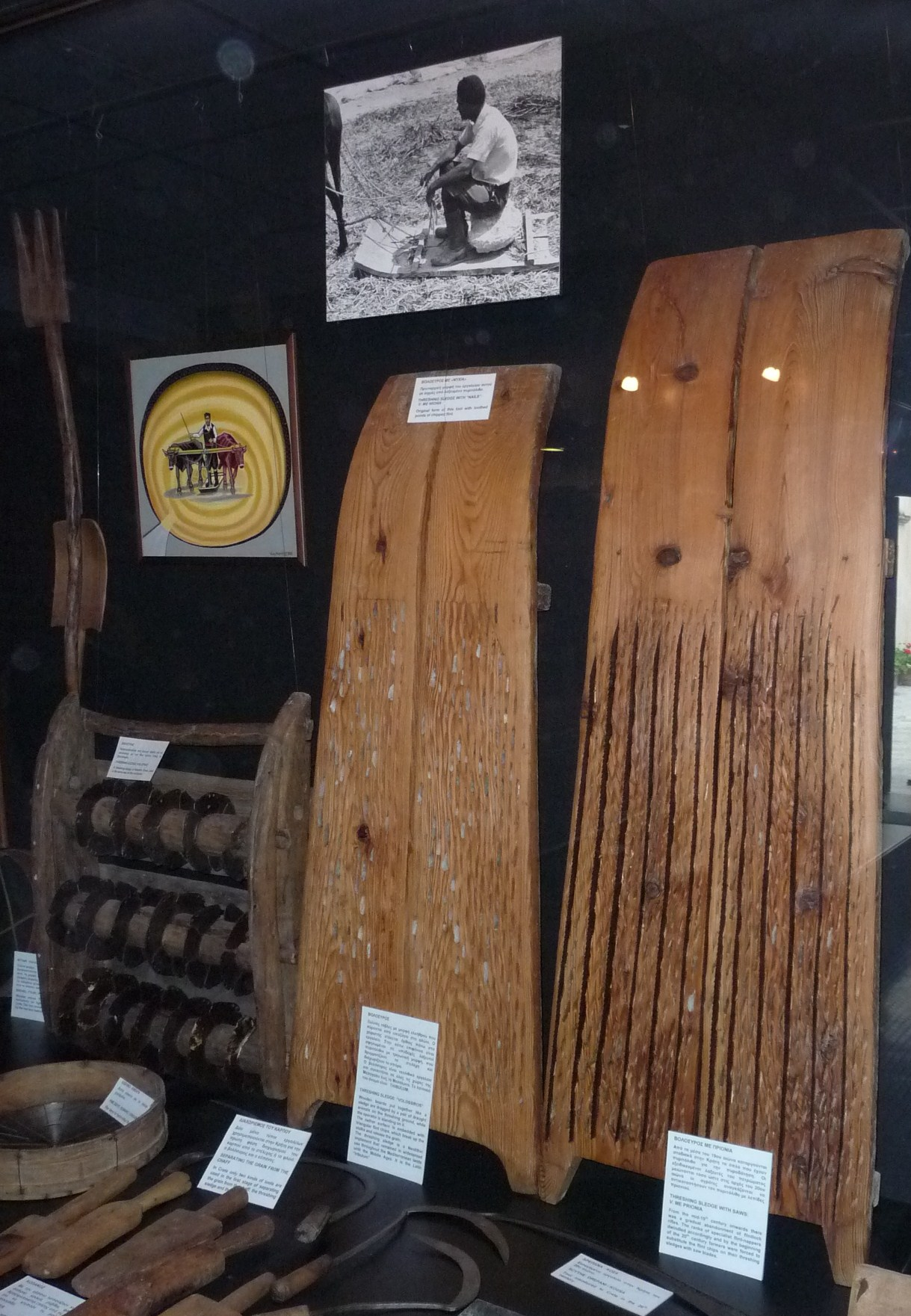
Agricultural equipment

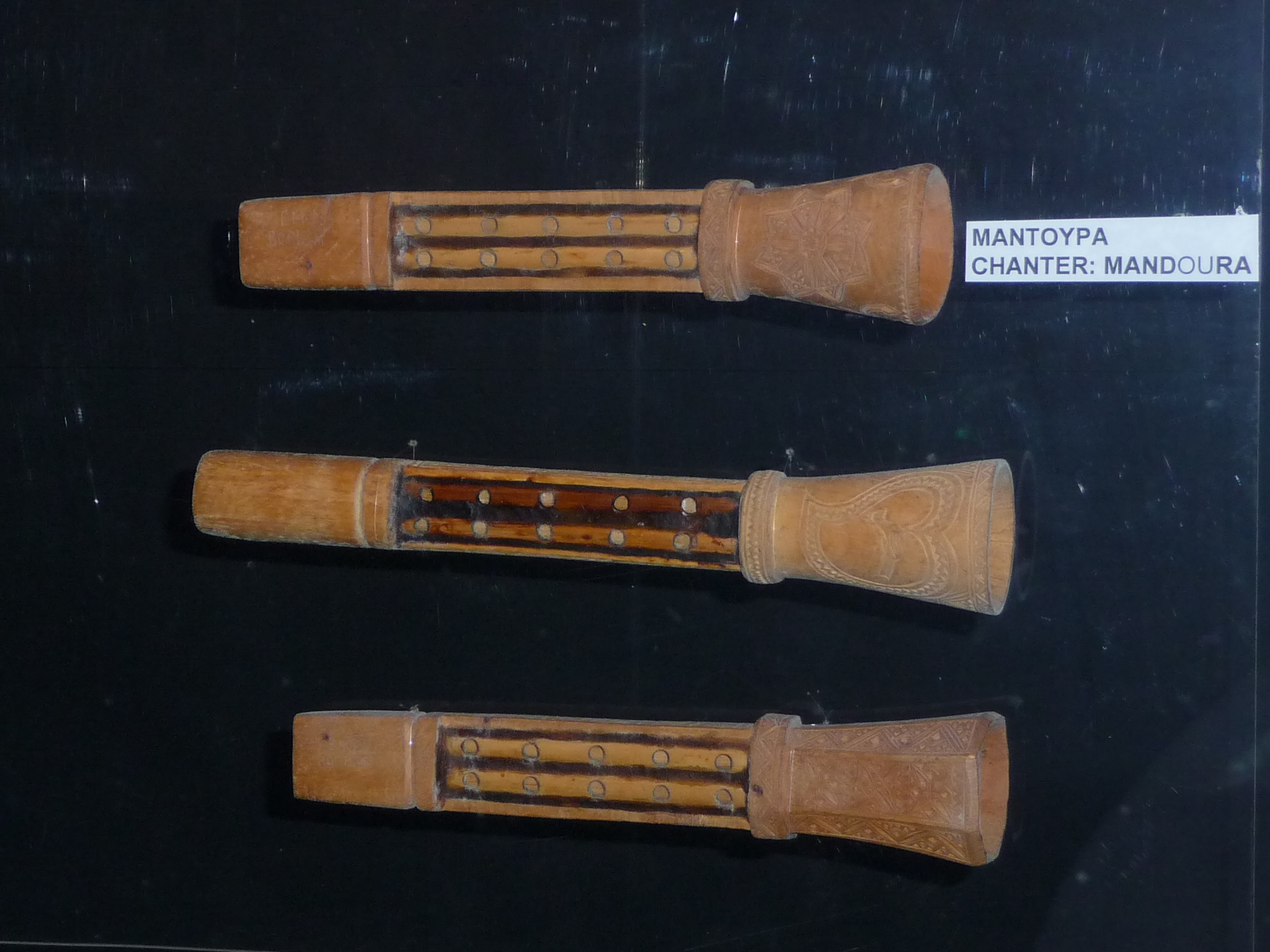
Flutes

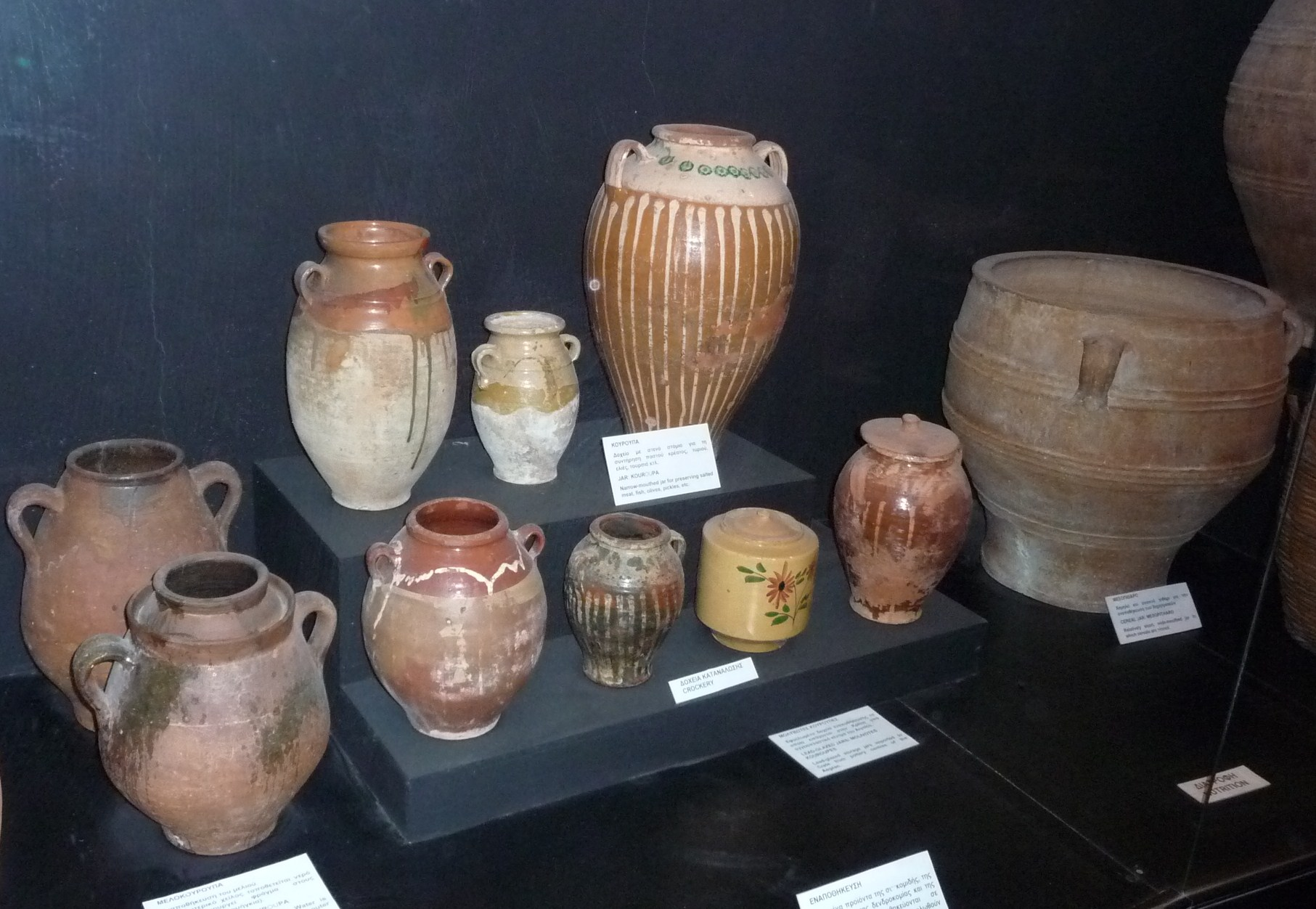
Pottery

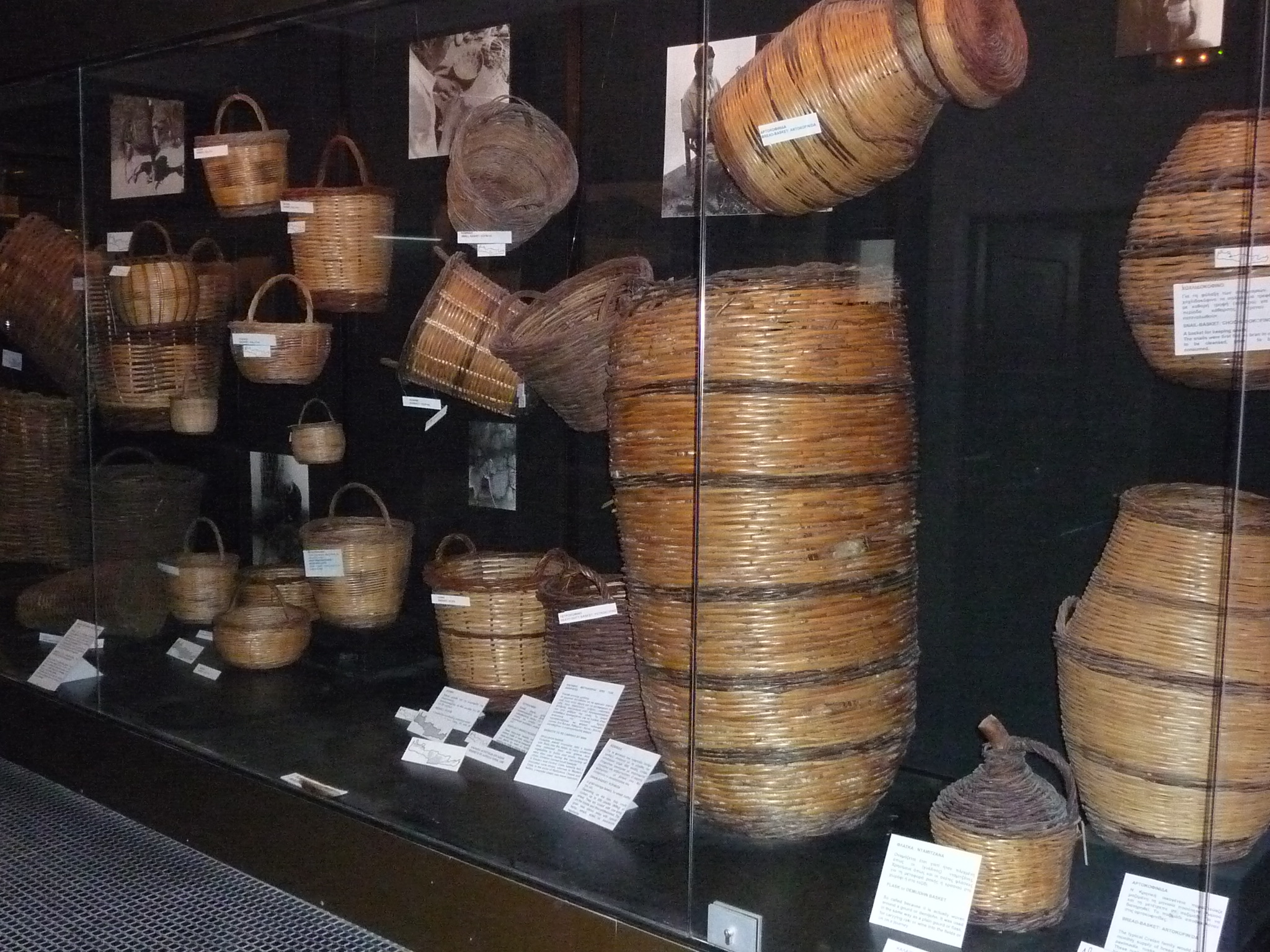
Wickerwork

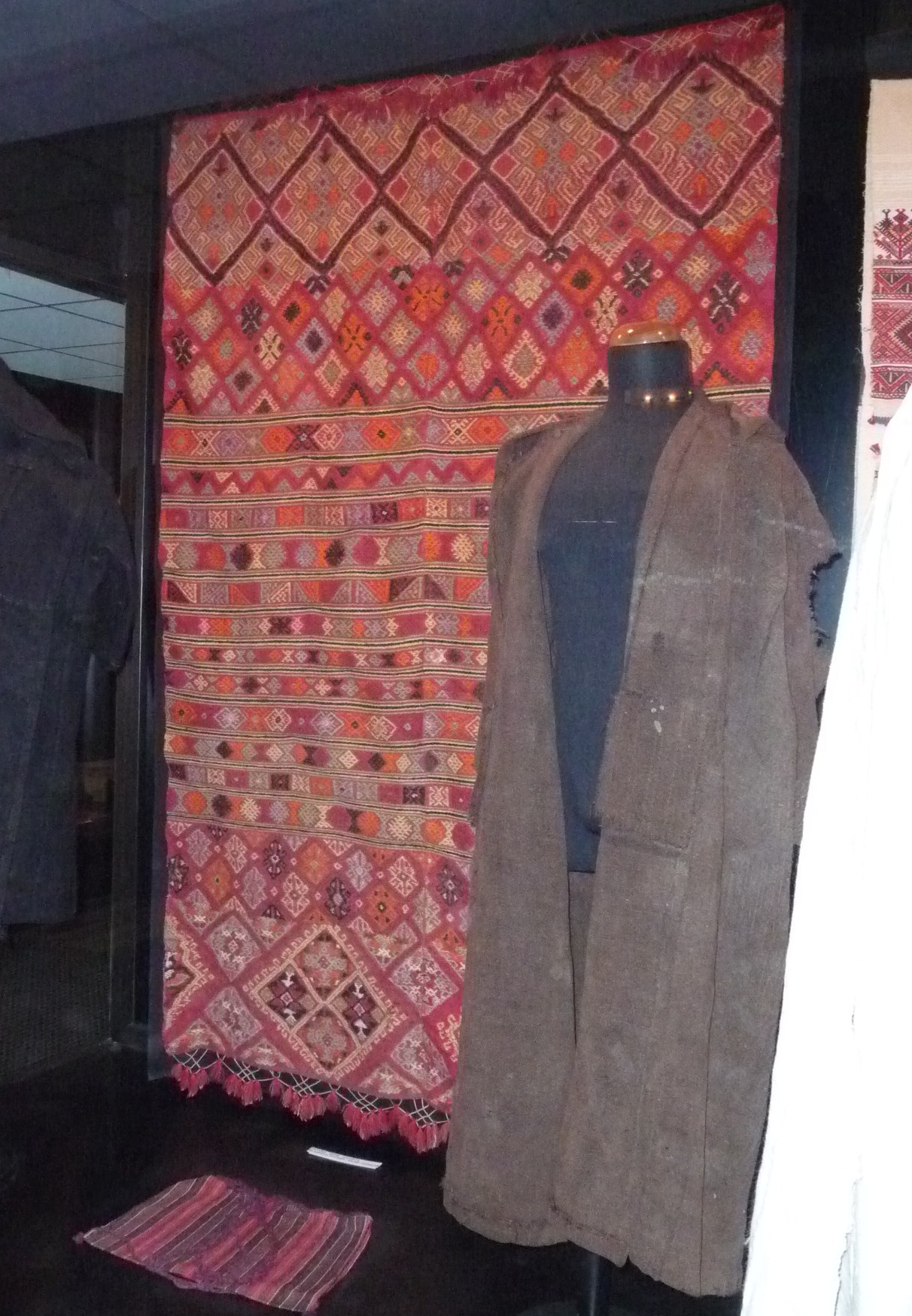
Blanket and cloak
