= Museum of Popular Architecture of Gorj =

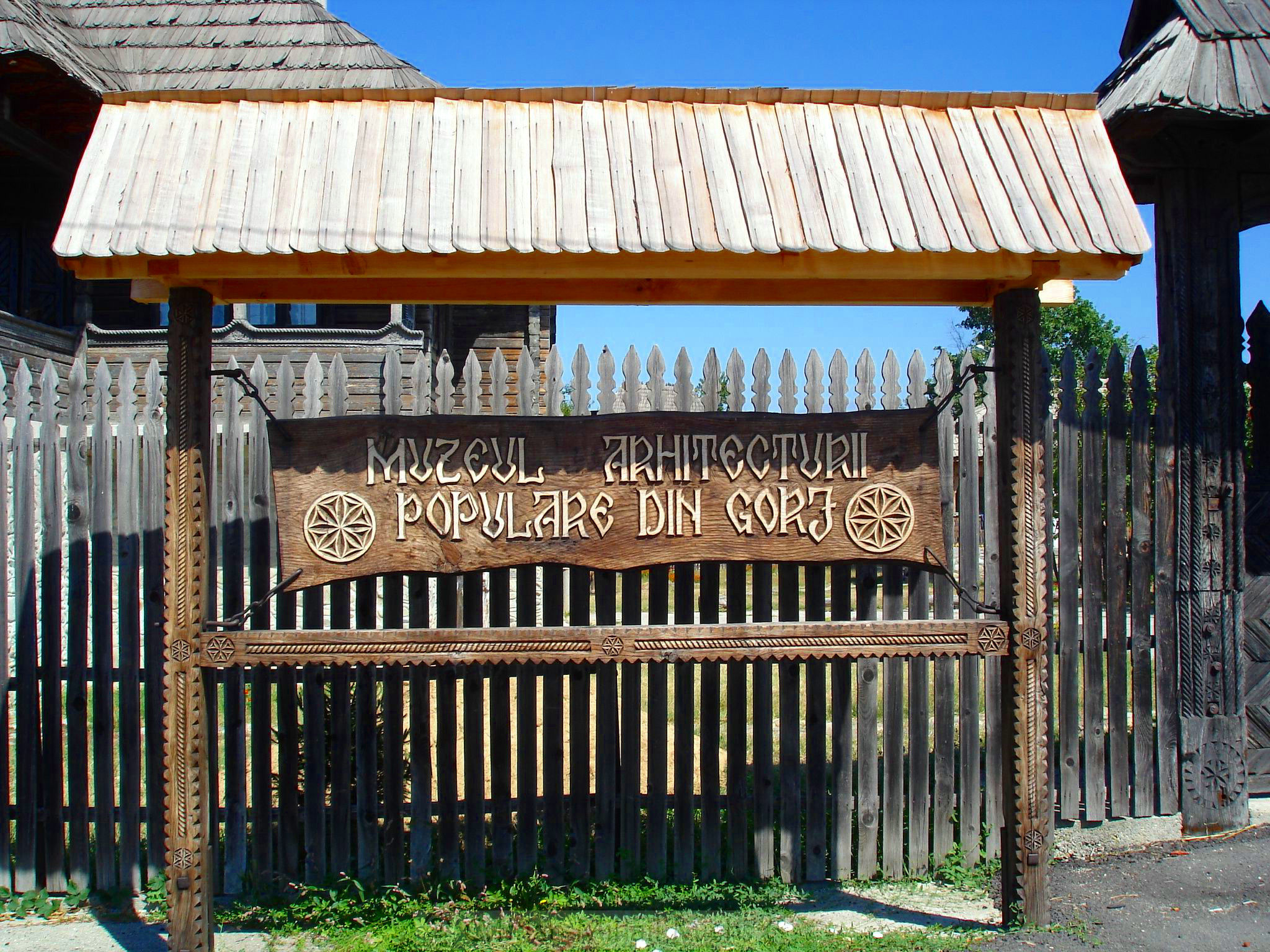
Entry gate to the museum

The Museum of Popular Architecture of Gorj (Romanian: Muzeul Arhitecturii Populare din Gorj) is an open-air museum located Curtișoara village, Bumbești-Jiu town, Gorj County, Romania. In presents constructions illustrating the popular architecture and artisan techniques specific to the county. The museum has been declared a historical monument by the Ministry of Culture and National Patrimony of Romania.
