= Ordu Ethnographical Museum =

Museum in Ordu, Turkey

- Ordu Etnoğrafya Müzesi
- Ordu Ethnographical Museum
- Established: 1987; 39 years ago
- Location: Taşocak street Ordu, Turkey
- Coordinates: 40°58′58″N 37°52′31″E
- Type: Ethnography, Archaeology
- Collection size: 1528 ethnographic, 180 archaeologic, 1252 coins
- Owner: Ministry of Culture and Tourism

Ordu Ethnographical Museum (Turkish: Ordu Etnoğrafya Müzesi) is a museum in Ordu, Turkey.

== Location and history ==
The museum is located in the city of Ordu on Taşocak street. The museum building is a historical building known as Paşaoğlu Mansion. A notable piece of civil architecture, it was built in 1896. In 1982, it was expropriated by the Ministry of Culture. Following a 4 years restoration, it was opened on 18 November 1987 as a museum. The three storey building (together with the yard) covers an area of 625 square metres (6,730 sq ft).

== Exhibits ==
The ground floor of the museum is reserved for administrative offices. The main ethnographic exhibits are on the first floor. Although the museum is an ethnographic museum, there are also some archaeological items and coins in the exhibits. The upper floor reflects the everyday life of Ordu citizens with mannequins. The number of items in the exhibit is 1528 ethnographic items, 180 archaeological items, 1252 coins, 26 historical stamps, and 21 handwritten manuscripts.
