= Amasra Museum =

Museum in Amasra District, Turkey

- Amasra Müzesi
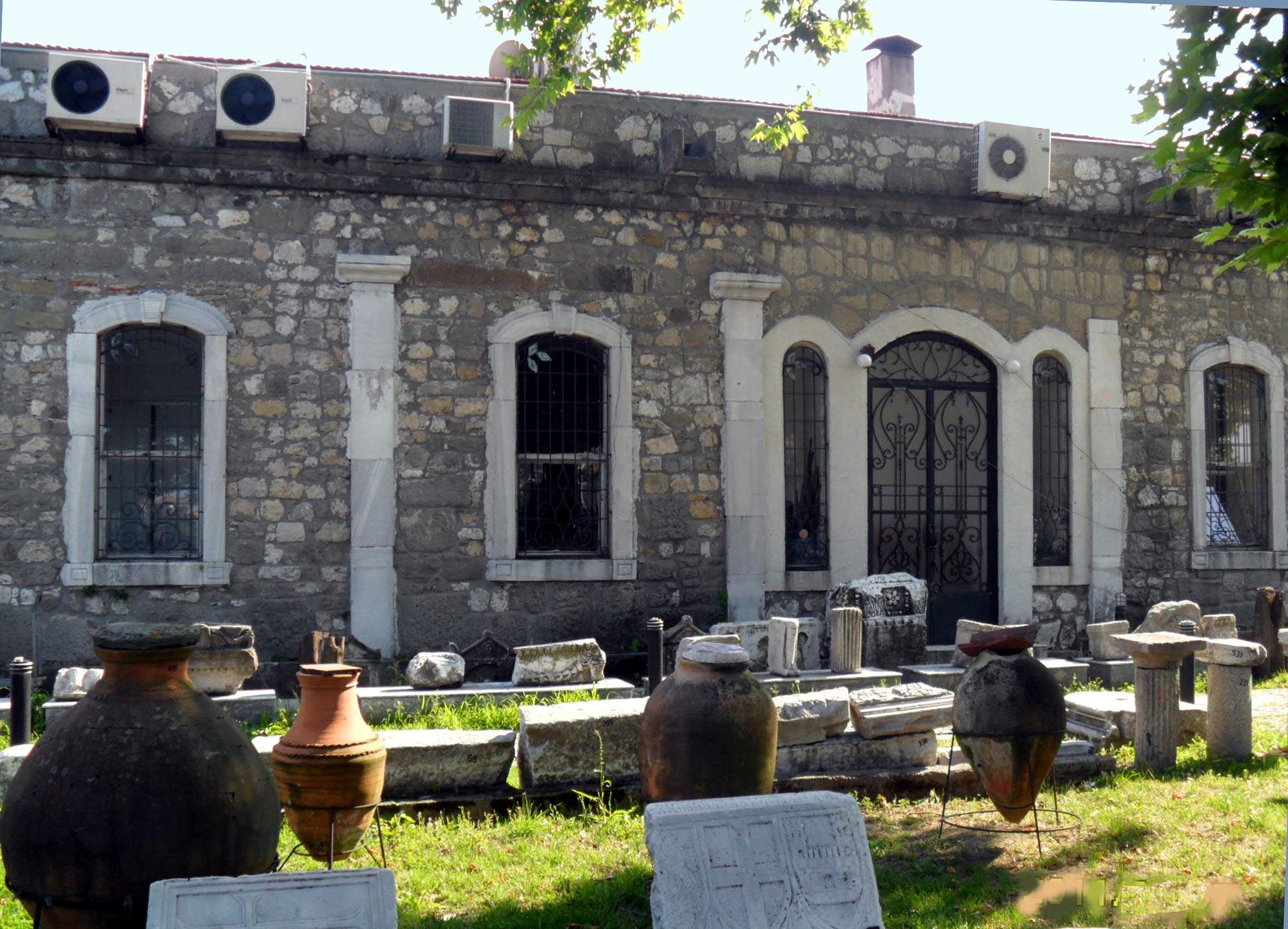
- Amasra Museum seen from the north.

- Location of Amasra Museum in Turkey.
- Established: 1982; 44 years ago
- Location: Kum Mah. Çamlık Sok. 4 Amasra, Bartın, Turkey
- Coordinates: 41°44′49″N 32°22′59″E
- Type: Archaeology, ethnography
- Collections: Hellenistic, Roman, Byzantine, Genoese, Ottoman periods
- Collection size: 901 (Archaeological); 744 (Ethnographic)
- Visitors: over 50,000 annually
- Owner: Ministry of Culture and Tourism
- Website: www.muze.gov.tr/tr/muzeler/amasra-muzesi

Amasra Museum (Turkish: Amasra Müzesi) is a museum in Amasra district of Bartın Province, northwestern Turkey. Established in 1982, it exhibits archaeological artifacts and ethnographic items.

The museum is visited by more than 50,000 tourists yearly.

== Location ==
Anasra Museum is situated on Çamlık Sok. 4 in Kum neighborhood of Amasra.

== History ==
The foundation of Amasra Museum goes back to 1955 when the collected items, which were stored in a small hall in the municipality building, were opened to the public as an exhibition.

In 1969, the museum moved to a former primary school building. On 30 January 1982, it was transferred to its current building. The construction of this building as a naval school began in 1884, it remained however unfinished. In 1975, the building was acquired by the Ministry of Culture and completed in 1976.

The museum building underwent a thorough restoration between 2014 and 2015.

== Exhibits ==
The one-story building consists of four halls, two reserved for archaeological artifacts and two for ethnographic items. Most of the exhibits are collected from Amasra and around. The museum holds a total of 1,168 items, 901 archaeological and 744 ethnographic.

The museum yard contains stone artifacts from the Hellenistic, Roman, Byzantine and Genoese periods.

A map of the Mediterranean Sea, dating back to 1884 and printed in the court printing shop, hangs on the wall of the museum's hallway.

Archaeology section

In the Hall #1, small-sized artifacts of the Hellenistic, Roman and Byzantine periods are exhibited. These are terracotta and glass teardrop and perfume bottles, golden and bronze jewelry found in graves as well as various amphoras and jugs extracted from undersea. There are bronze figurines, bracelets, fish hooks, Christian crosses, weapons, oil lamps, pots and also golden, silver and bronze coins on display.

The Hall #2 contains marble artifacts like statues, busts, steles and architectural elements with relief ornaments from Hellenistic, Roman, Byzantine and Genoese periods.

Ethnography section

Small-sized objects from the late Ottoman period are exhibited in the Hall #1 of the Ethnography section including copper kitchenware, weapons, writing tools, candelabra, seals, scales, earthenware and rings. In addition, wooden pots are on display reflecting the art of wood cutting unique to the Amasra region.

Hall #2 is reserved for apparel and silver jewelry of the region from the late Ottoman period. These are coverlets, pillow covers, Qurans, carpets, bath gloves and old wall clocks.
