= Departmental Museum of archaeology Gilort (Jérôme) Carcopino =

Museum in Aleria, Corsica

Coordinates: 42.1046°N 9.5112°E

The Departmental Museum of archaeology Gilort (Jérôme) Carcopino is situated in the commune of Aléria in Corsica (France) at around 70 kilometers from Bastia and at 120 kilometers from Ajaccio.

== The Museum ==
In the museum it’s possible to find collections of archaeology, of religious art and of ethnography. The director of the museum is Ghjuvan Claudiu Ottaviani. The museum takes place in the Fort of Matra (14th century) situated in the old part of Aleria at about two kilometers from the modern village. The collections in the museum of Aleria pertain to fifteen centuries of history of Corsica and the same Aleria, from the 10th century BCE to the 5th century CE.

Quite a lot of the exposed objects are of a great archaeological importance, both for that it concerns the knowledge of Corsica, but also for that of the Mediterranean world.

This importance derives from the archaeological site of Aleria, that was not only one of the ancient capitals of Corsica, but that has also been during its history, colony of the Greeks from Phocaea, then of the Carthaginians, then of the Romans and that it has finally been invaded and destroyed by the Vandals in the 5th century.

Among the remarkable artifacts in the museum that can be mentioned, there are a dish representing one of the elephants of Hannibal in march, two Greek cups for the libations (rhyton) having an extraordinary and rare zoomorphic shape reproducing a head of dog and that of a mule or a horse. Finally, there are Greek, Roman, and Etruscan ceramics and vases, arms of bronze, amphoras, coins and many objects of daily life.

== The Fort of Matra ==
The Fort of Matra is a monument classified as national monument from 1962. It was built by the Genoese in the 14th century. It was headquarter of a squadron of cavalry, whose mission was to guard the territories of the district, the oriental coast and the zone of the coastal ponds. In fact, the military importance of the fort derived from its strategic position being situated on top of an impending hill. During the centuries the fort had become a deposit of weapons for the Genoese and for this reason, in 1729, it was partially destroyed from the Corsican that were rebelling them.

The fort, reconstructed subsequently, has welcomed the king Theodore I of Corsica during his short kingdom over Corsica. Subsequently it came in the hands of the powerful family Matra, that has had the control of the fort.

Mariu Emmanuele Matra was the most known Matra family member in the struggle against Pasquale Paoli for the rule over Corsica. He died March 28 th 1757, but the fort remained within the ownership of his family.

The following year to its classification as national monument, in 1963, a deposit of the picked archaeological material was installed in the fort collecting all the material coming from the district and above all what found during the excavations effected in the old Aleria, at only some hundred meters of distance from the fort. After 1979 the fort of Matra was purchased by the Haute-Corse department of France and this material became the basis of the new Museum.

== Photo gallery ==
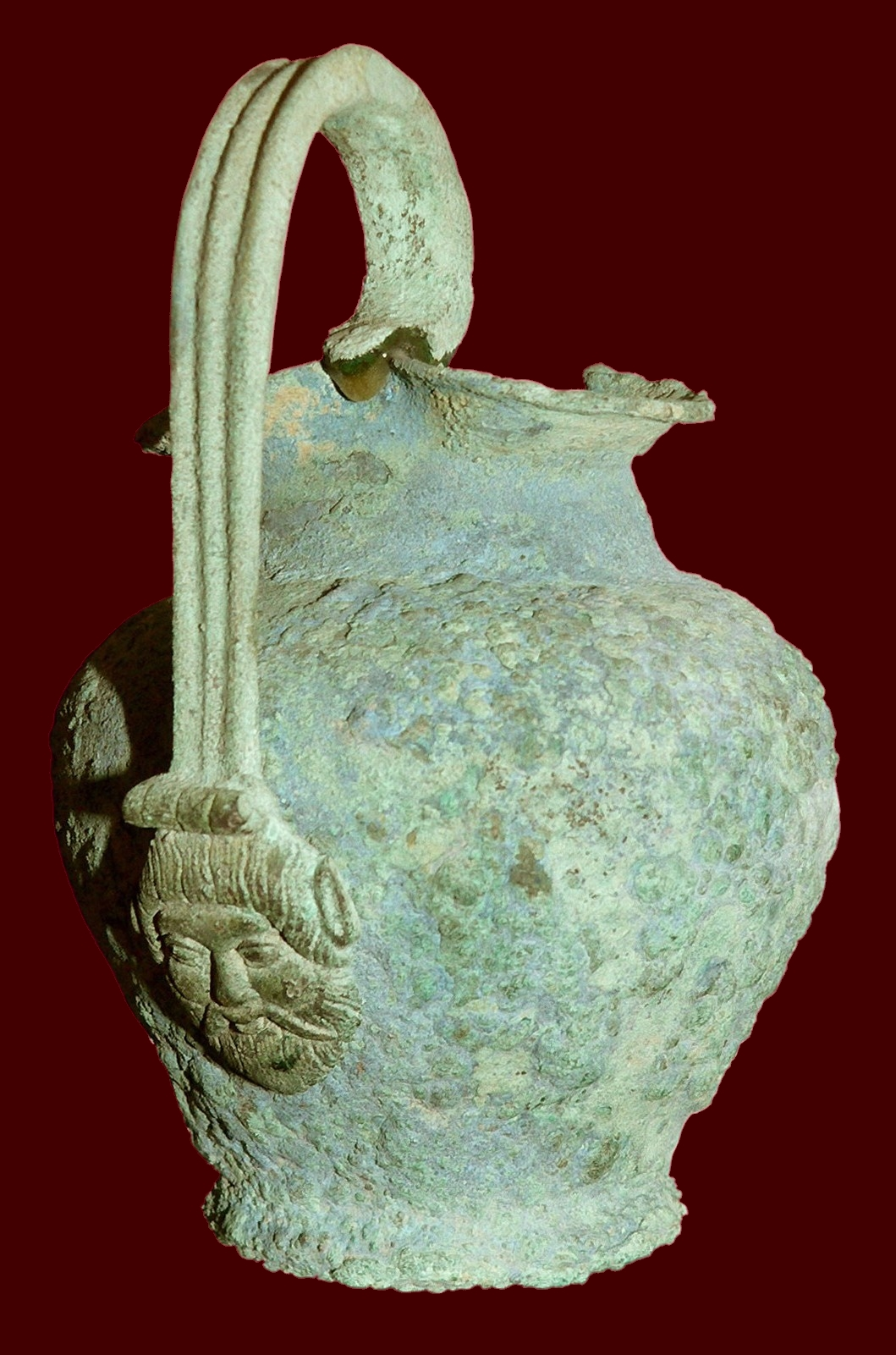
Amphora in bronze

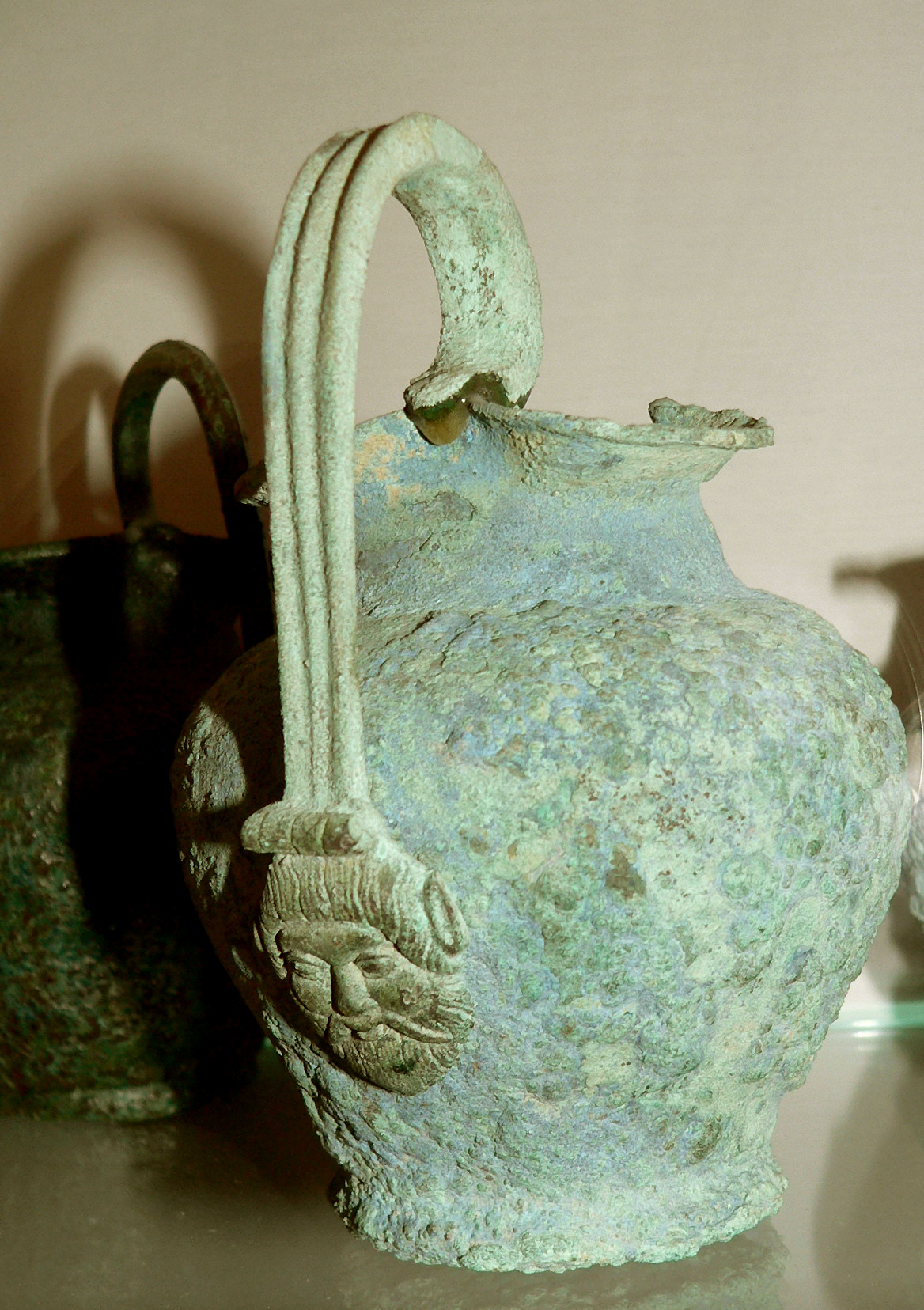
Amphora in bronze

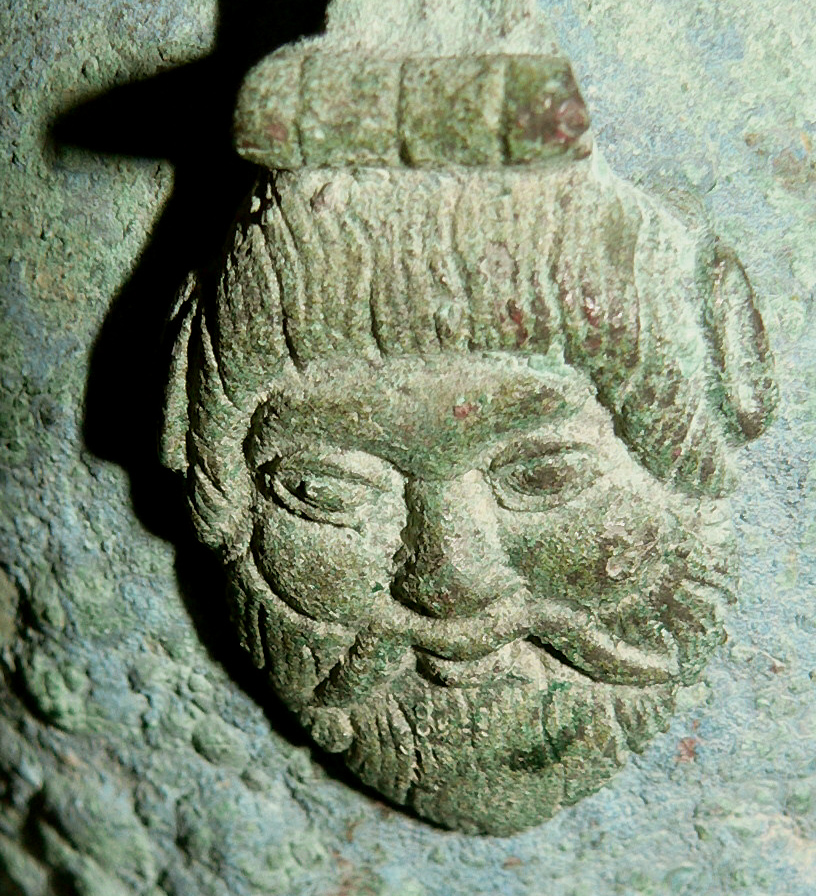
Medaillon in bronze

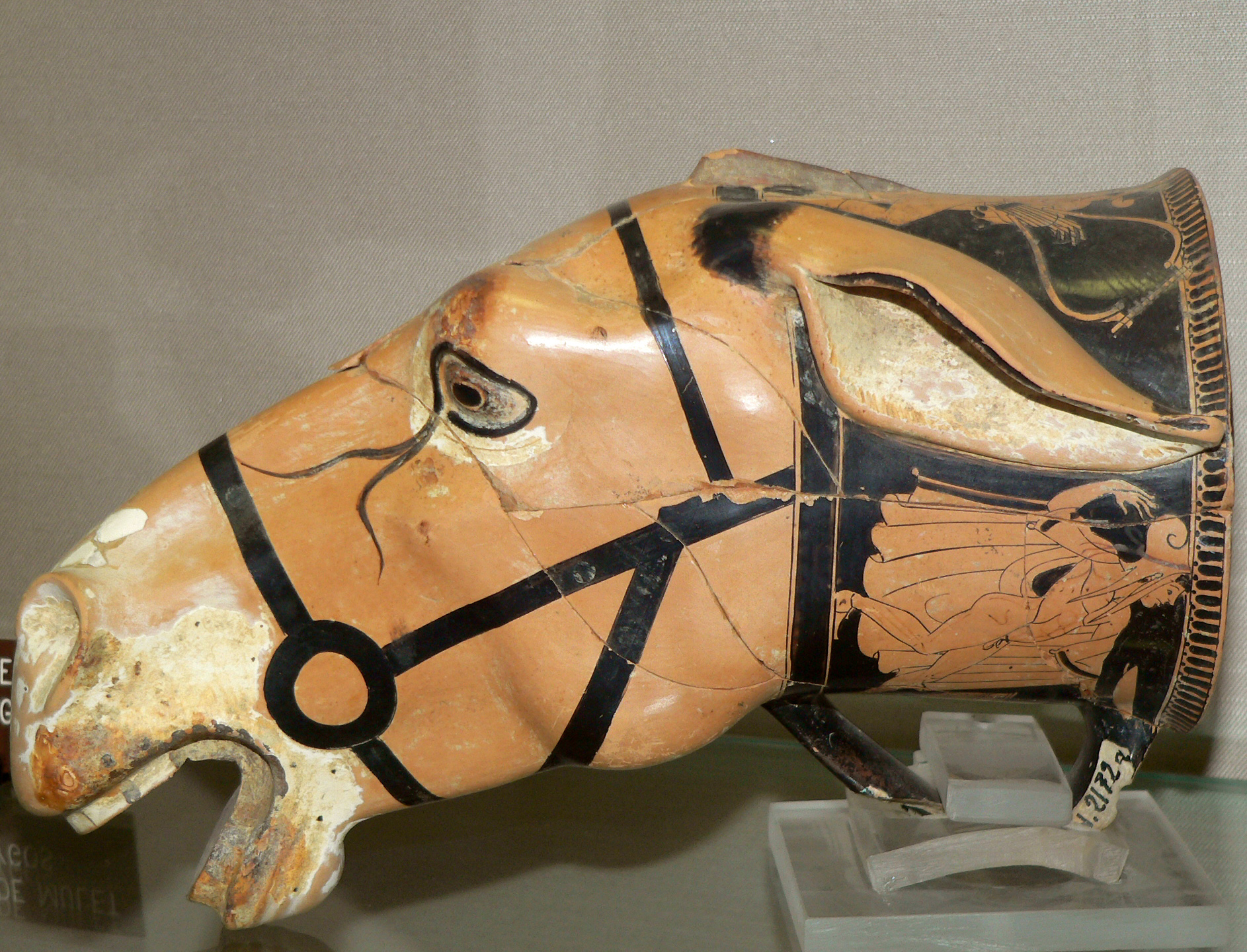
Head of a horse

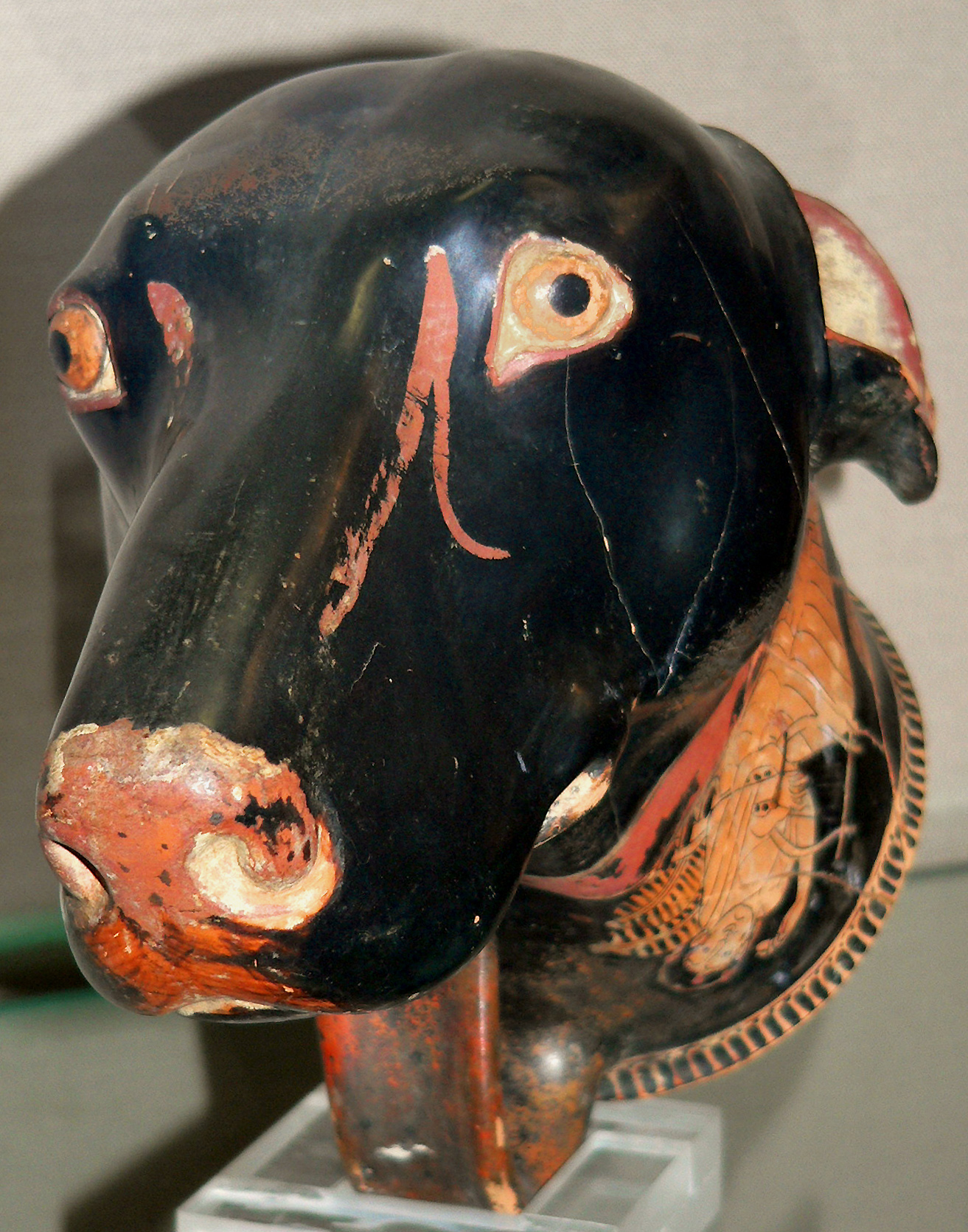
Head of a dog

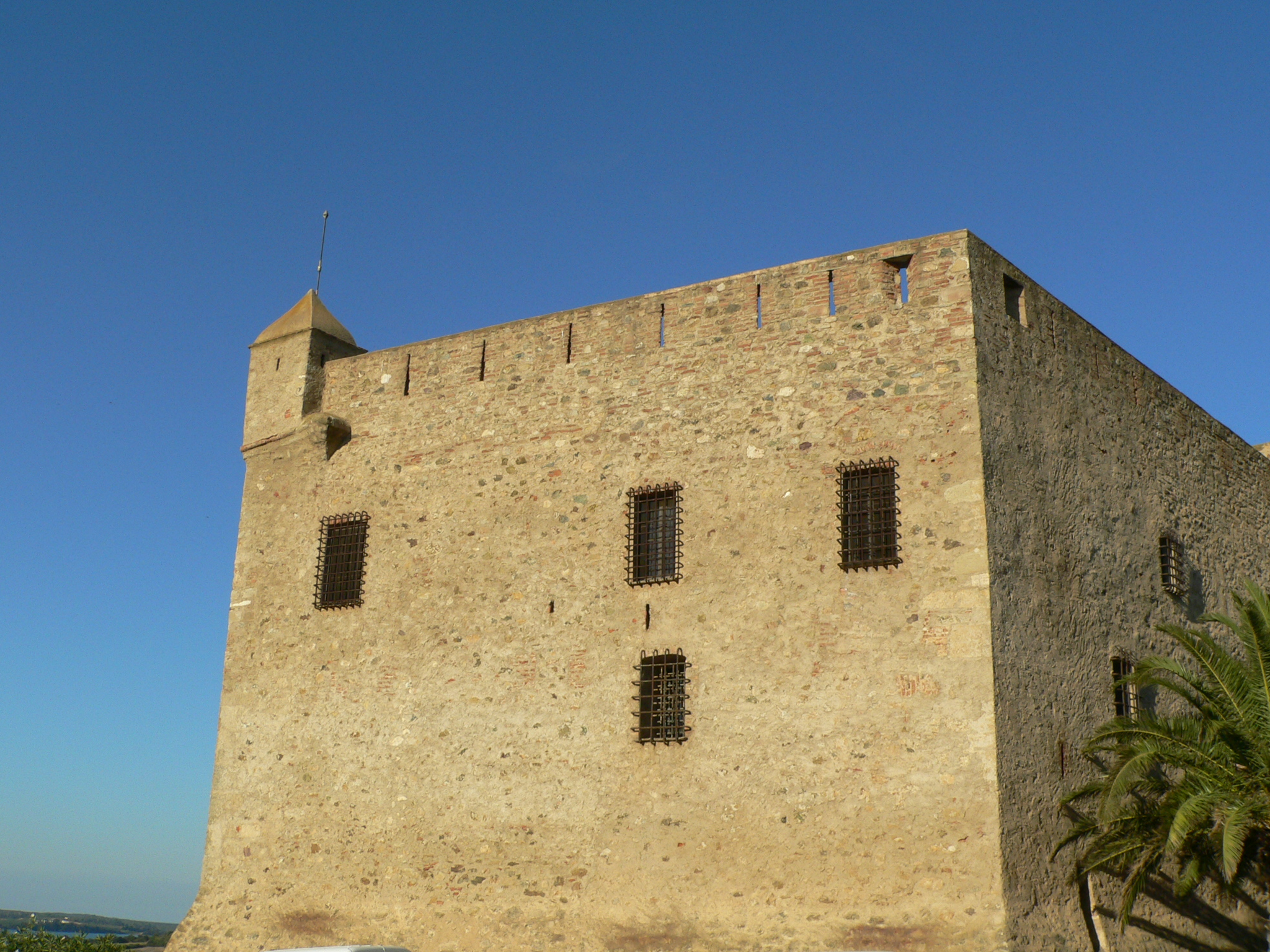
Fort of Matra

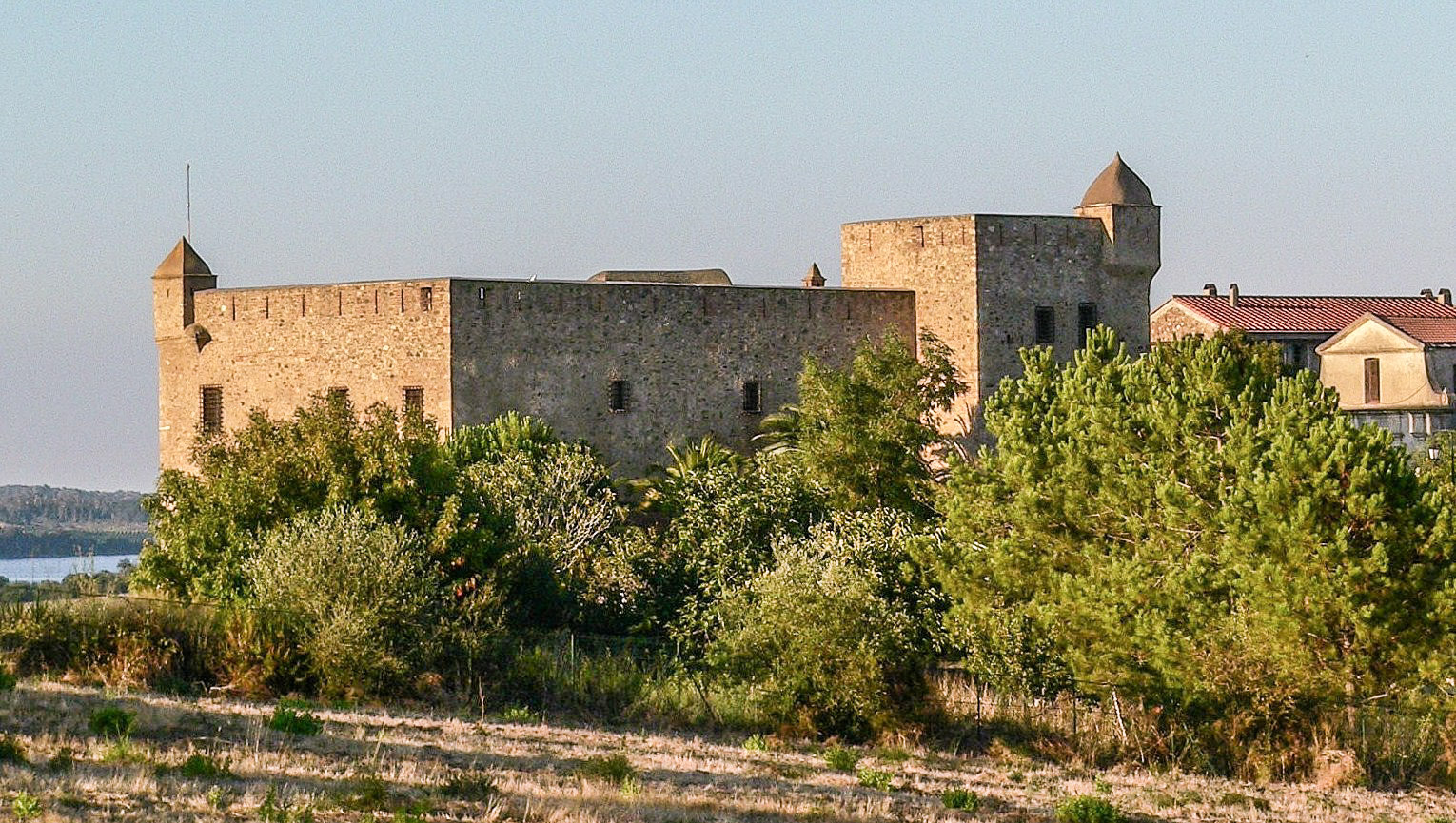
Fort of Matra

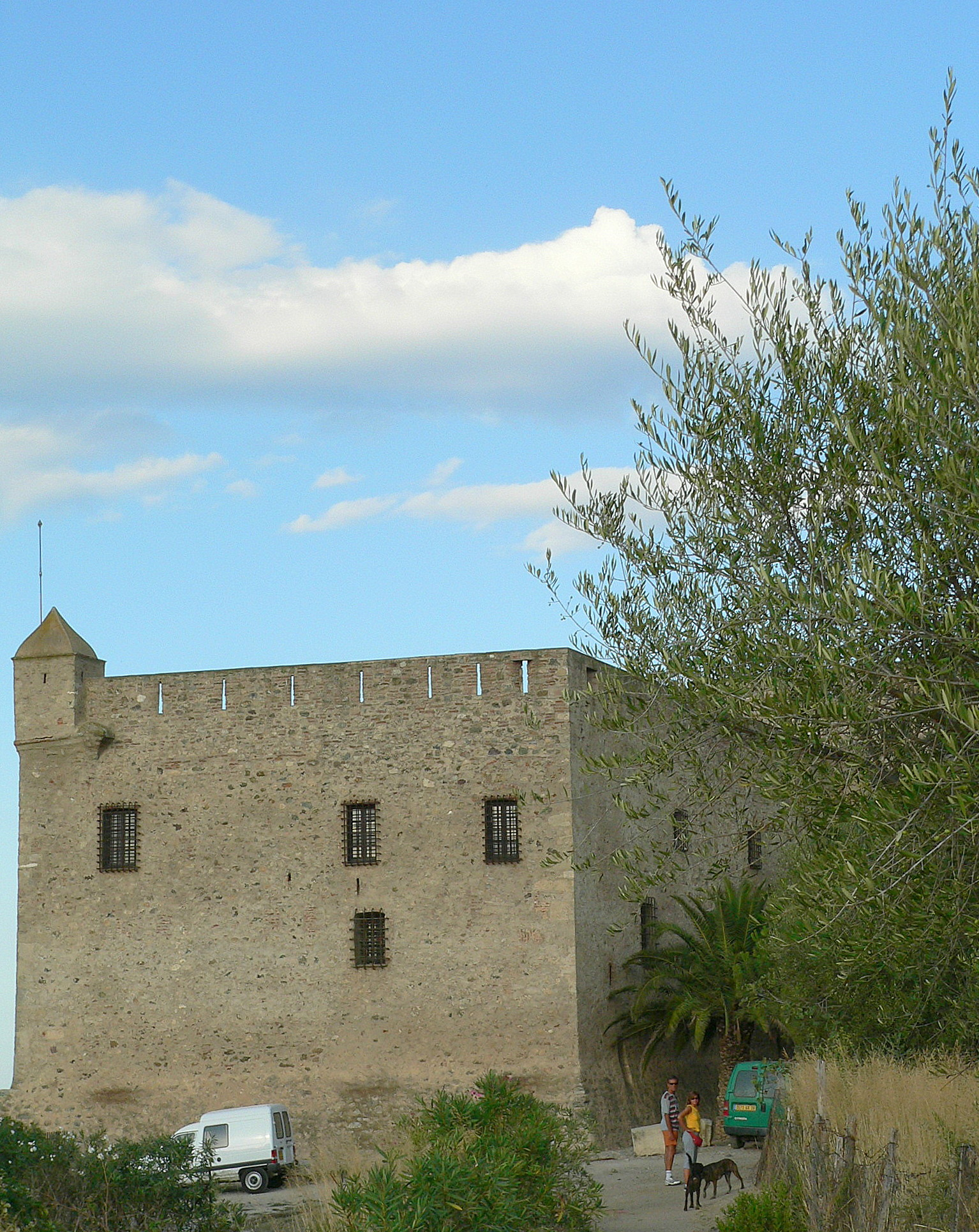
Fort of Matra
