= Conjugal visit =

Prison visit for the spouse of an inmate

A conjugal visit is a scheduled period in which an inmate of a prison or jail is permitted to spend several hours or days in private with a visitor. The visitor is usually their legal spouse. The generally recognized basis for permitting such visits in modern times is to preserve family bonds and increase the chances of success for a prisoner's eventual return to ordinary life after release from prison. They also provide an incentive for inmates to comply with the various day-to-day rules and regulations of the prison.

Conjugal visits usually take place in designated rooms or a structure provided for that purpose, such as a trailer or a small cabin. Supplies such as soap, condoms, lubricant, bed linens, and towels may be provided.

== Country ==
=== Australia ===
In Australia, conjugal visits are permitted in the Australian Capital Territory and Victoria. Other jurisdictions, including Western Australia and Queensland, do not permit conjugal visits.

=== Belgium ===
According to the European Union Agency for Fundamental Rights (FRA), in Belgium "according to the law, conjugal visits are possible, subject to the exceptions provided for by law, at least once a month for a minimum of two hours."

=== Brazil ===
In Brazil, male prisoners are eligible to be granted conjugal visits for both heterosexual and homosexual relationships, while women's conjugal visits are tightly regulated, if granted at all.

=== Canada ===
In Canada, all inmates in federal correctional facilities, with the exception of those on disciplinary restrictions or at risk for family violence, are permitted "private family visits" of up to 72 hours' duration once every two months. Eligible visitors, who may not themselves be prison inmates, are: spouse, or common-law partner of at least six months; children; parents; foster parents; siblings; grandparents; and "persons with whom, in the opinion of the institutional head, the inmate has a close familial bond". Food is provided by the institution but paid for by the inmates and visitors, who are also responsible for cleaning the unit after the visit. Prison staff have regular contact with the inmate and visitors during a visit.

=== Czech Republic ===
In the Czech Republic, a prison warden has the authority to allow an inmate "a visit without visual and auditory supervision of the employees of the Prison Service". Inmate's medical check and mental health check is required before such visit is permitted.

=== Estonia ===
Conjugal visits of up to 72 hours with (including de facto) spouses or registered partners or relatives are permitted at least once every half year. This is permitted assuming no safety issues with the inmate or lack of confidence in the reputability of the visitor. The visits last 24 hours by default, but may be extended to 72 hours rewarding inmates' good behaviour. Visits take place in designated rooms on prison grounds without supervision.

=== France ===
In France, inmates are permitted conjugal visits. Visits last up to 72 hours and take place in mini-apartments consisting of two small rooms, a kitchen and a dining area.

=== Germany ===
Germany allows prisoners and their spouses or partners to apply for conjugal visits. Those who are approved are allowed unsupervised visits so that prisoners can preserve intimate bonds with their partners. Prisoners are to be searched before being allowed a visit. In 2010, an inmate murdered his girlfriend and attempted suicide during a visit, leading to additional criticism of the lax security in German prisons.

=== Hong Kong ===
Hong Kong does not permit conjugal visits.

=== India ===
In 2015, the Punjab and Haryana High Court held that the right of married convicts and jail inmates to have conjugal visits or artificial insemination for pregnancy was a fundamental right. In January 2018, the Madras High Court allowed a two-week conjugal visit to an inmate serving a life term in Tamil Nadu prison for the "purpose of procreation".

In October 2022, Punjab became the first state in India to allow conjugal visits to prisoners. According to a senior official, this decision was taken to keep the stress levels of inmates under control and ensure their re-entry into society, and this also fulfills a basic biological need. Under this scheme, prisoners who exhibited good conduct would be allowed to spend two hours in private with their spouses after every two months. Some categories of prisoners are kept out of this program, which includes high-risk prisoners, terrorists, gangsters and those imprisoned for domestic violence, child abuse and sexual crimes. Moreover, both spouses must be free from infectious diseases like HIV, STDs and tuberculosis, to avail this program.

=== Ireland ===
Ireland does not allow conjugal visits. Marie and Noel Murray, an anarchist married couple imprisoned for a 1976 murder, lost a 1991 appeal for conjugal rights. The Supreme Court ruled that the Constitutional right to beget children within marriage was suspended while a spouse was lawfully imprisoned.

=== Israel ===
The Israel Prison Service (IPS) allows standard conjugal visits to inmates who are married or are in a common-law relationship or if their partner has been visiting them frequently for at least two years, and have a record of good behavior. Inmates who receive prison furloughs are not eligible for conjugal visits. Conjugal visits can be withheld on security grounds or as a means of punishment for misbehavior. IPS guidelines were clarified in July 2013 to allow conjugal visits of same-sex partners. Israel extends this right to all its citizens regardless of religion, while Palestinian citizens from the West Bank and the Gaza Strip who are imprisoned in Israeli jails are denied conjugal visits.

=== Japan ===
In Japan, conjugal visits are not allowed.

=== Mexico ===
Conjugal visits are a universal practice in Mexico, independent of a prisoner's marital status; in some correctional facilities, entire families are allowed to live in prisons with their imprisoned relative for extended periods. Specifically in Mexico City, in July 2007, the prison system in that city has begun to allow gay prisoners to have conjugal visits from their partners, on the basis of a 2003 law which bans discrimination based on sexual orientation.

=== Netherlands ===
The Netherlands allows for one unsupervised visit (Bezoek zonder Toezicht) per month, provided the imprisonment period is at least six months and there is a close and durable relation between the partners. This does not apply to maximum security penitentiaries.

=== New Zealand ===
New Zealand does not permit conjugal visits.

=== Pakistan ===
In Pakistan, conjugal visits prior to 2009 were permitted only under special circumstances. In August 2009, Federal Shariat Court ruled that married prisoners should be allowed conjugal visits at the designated facilities within the jail complex and alternatively, they should be granted a short parole to visit their spouses. Following the ruling, the Province of Sindh was the first to adopt legislation providing conjugal visits for married prisoners within jail premises. Human Rights Book 2010 reports that conjugal visits are now available for prisoners in all provinces and federal territories if they are male and married. Since homosexuality is considered a criminal offense in Pakistan and same-sex marriage is not recognized by law, this privilege applies only to heterosexual couples.

=== Romania ===
According to the European Union Agency for Fundamental Rights (FRA), in Romania "the law provides for the right to conjugal visits."

=== Russia ===
In the Russian penal system, since a campaign of prison reform that began in 2001, well-behaved prisoners are granted an eighteen-day holiday furlough from incarceration to see loved ones. Prisoners also get extended on-site family visits, approximately once per month.

=== Spain ===
In Spain, prisoners are allowed conjugal visits every four to eight weeks. They are held in private rooms and can last up to three hours. Couples are provided with condoms, shower facilities, and clean towels.

=== Turkey ===
Since April 2013, the Turkish General Directorate of Prisons and Detention offers conjugal visits as a reward to well-behaved prisoners.

=== United Kingdom ===
The English, Welsh, Scottish and Northern Irish prison systems do not allow conjugal visits. However, home visits, with a greater emphasis on building other links with the outside world to which the prisoner will be returned, are allowed. These home visits are usually only granted to prisoners who have a few weeks to a few months remaining of a long sentence. Furthermore, home visits are more likely to be granted if the prisoner is deemed to have a low risk of absconding (i.e. prisoners being held in open prisons have a better chance of being granted home visits than prisoners being held in closed conditions).

=== United States ===
The first state to implement conjugal visits was Mississippi in the Mississippi State Penitentiary (Parchman). It was enacted to convince black male prisoners to work harder in their manual labor. This was done unofficially at first, but had become official policy at Parchman Penitentiary by the 1950s.

In Lyons v. Gilligan (1974), the United States District Court for the Northern District of Ohio held that prisoners have no federal constitutional right to conjugal visits with their spouses during sentences.

As of 2008, conjugal visitation programs are now known as the extended-family visits or family-reunion visits because mothers, fathers, and other family members may attend these visits. The focus is on family ties and rehabilitation.

==== Federal prisons ====
The Federal Bureau of Prisons does not allow conjugal visits for prisoners in federal custody.

==== State prisons ====
For prisoners in state custody, the availability of conjugal visits is governed by the law of the particular state. The four states that currently allow conjugal visits are California, Connecticut, New York, and Washington.

Where conjugal visits are allowed, inmates must meet certain requirements to qualify for this privilege: The visitor may be required to undergo a background check, and the inmate must also be free of any sexually transmitted diseases. As a matter of procedure, both visitor and inmate are searched before and after the visit, to ensure that the visitor has not attempted to smuggle any items into or out of the facility.

Jorja Leap, a professor of social welfare at the Luskin School of Public Affairs at the University of California, Los Angeles stated that criminologists believe allowing conjugal visits would build family ties and reduce recidivism. Over the last 40 years, most new prisons included special buildings specifically designed for conjugal visits.

By the early 1990s, 17 states had conjugal programs. According to Leap, conjugal visits declined after an increase in attitudes that prison should be a place for punishment and that conjugal visits were not appropriate for people being punished, and also because academic literature in the 1980s and 1990s argued that it was not possible to rehabilitate some criminals. Many states that once allowed conjugal visits have since eliminated the programs. In April 2011, New York adopted legislation to allow family visits for married partners. In January 2014, the head of the Mississippi Department of Corrections, Chris Epps, terminated the state conjugal program. New Mexico announced it was also ending its program in May 2014.

In June 2007, the California Department of Corrections announced it would allow same-sex conjugal visits. The policy was enacted to comply with a 2005 state law requiring state agencies to give the same rights to domestic partners that heterosexual couples receive. The new rules allow for visits only by registered, married same-sex couples or domestic partners who are not themselves incarcerated. Further, the same-sex marriage or domestic partnership must have been established before the prisoner was incarcerated.

== See also ==
- Same-sex conjugal visit, in the article LGBTQ people in prison
- Relationships for incarcerated individuals
