= UCLA Luskin School of Public Affairs =

Public affairs school of UCLA

Coordinates: 34.074420°N 118.439065°W

UCLA Meyer and Renee Luskin School of Public Affairs
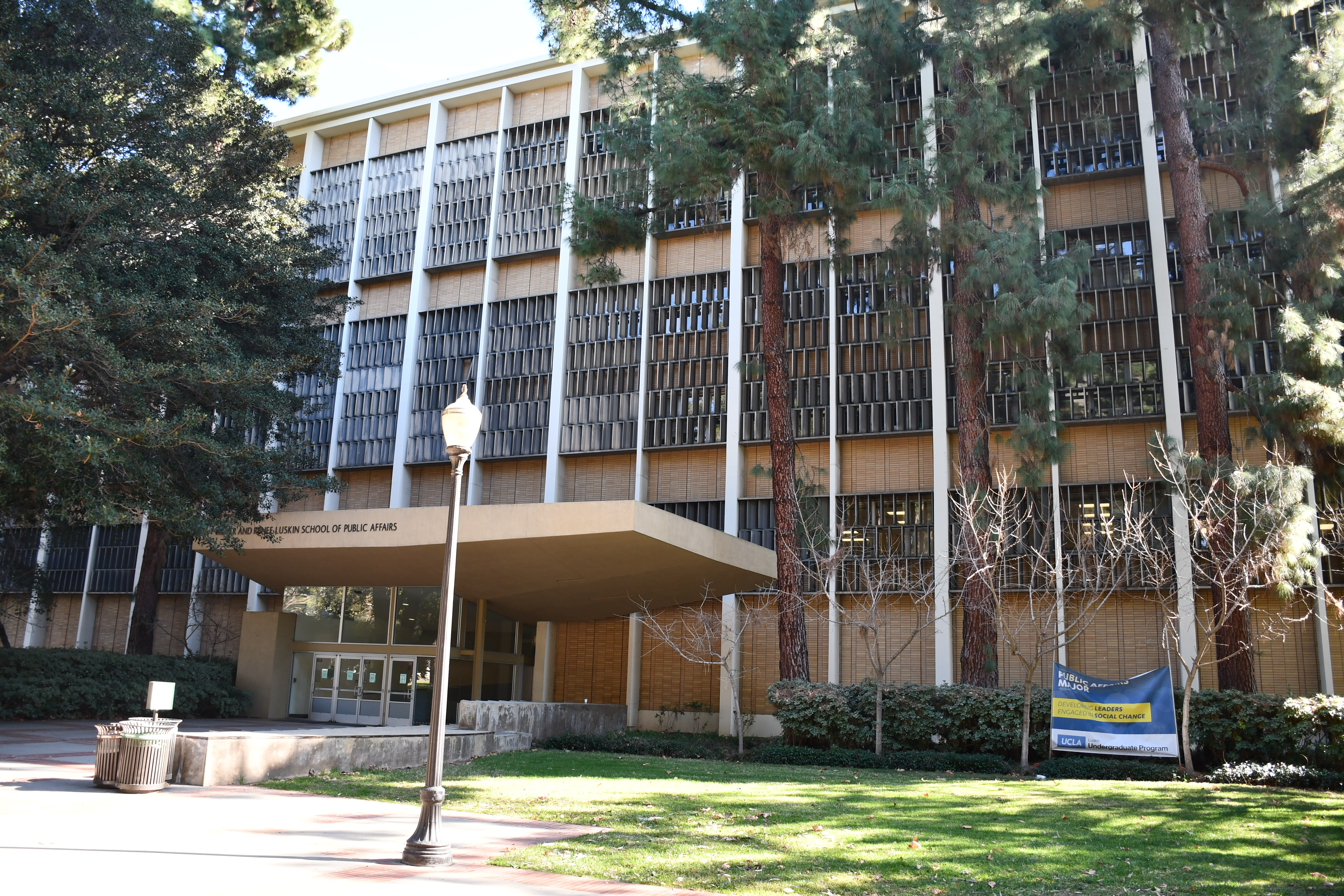
- Former names: School of Public Policy and Social Research (SPPSR)
- Type: Public
- Established: 1994
- Parent institution: University of California, Los Angeles
- Dean: Anastasia Loukaitou-Sideris
- Faculty: 75
- Students: 1,199 students
- Location: Los Angeles, CA, California, United States
- Campus: Urban
- Website: luskin.ucla.edu

The UCLA Luskin School of Public Affairs (officially the UCLA Meyer and Renee Luskin School of Public Affairs) is the public affairs graduate school at the University of California, Los Angeles. The school consists of three graduate departments—Public Policy, Social Welfare, and Urban Planning—and an undergraduate program in Public Affairs that began accepting students in 2018. In all, the school offers three undergraduate minors, the undergraduate major, four master's degrees, and two doctoral degrees.

The UCLA Luskin School of Public Affairs continues to be ranked among the top public affairs graduate schools in California, maintaining its position as the No. 3 public affairs school in the state. Nationally, UCLA Luskin is ranked No. 20 (tie) in the 2026 U.S. News & World Report.

UCLA Luskin's Social Work program maintained a top-tier position at No. 8 in the nation in 2026. The School also remains highly ranked across several key policy subspecialties: No. 6 nationally for social policy, No. 11 for urban policy, and No. 18 for public policy analysis. The School earned new recognition in the local government management category.

In April 2026, the UCLA Luskin Department of Social Welfare received a $13.5 million investment from Ballmer Group as part of a $33 million campuswide initiative to expand youth mental health training. The funding supports fellowships and specialized training programs to prepare social workers for underserved communities.

Founded in 1994, UCLA Luskin incorporates the best practices in scholarship, research and teaching in the fields of social work, urban and regional planning, and policymaking. Formerly called the UCLA School of Public Affairs, it was renamed on March 18, 2011, in honor of alumni Meyer and Renee Luskin following their $100 million gift to UCLA, with half of the donation establishing endowments for the school.

The Luskin School of Public Affairs building is located in the northeast section of the UCLA campus adjacent to the Murphy Sculpture Garden.

== Departments and degrees ==
The Luskin School of Public Affairs offers degrees in the following concentrations:

- Public policy – MPP
- Social welfare – MSW, PhD
- Urban planning – MURP, PhD
- Real Estate Development —MRED
- Public affairs – BA

Joint degree programs (J.D., MBA., Latin American Studies, Architecture and Urban Design, and Asian American Studies) are offered. Consult individual departments for more information.

The following minors are offered for undergraduate UCLA students:

- Public affairs
- Urban and Regional Studies
- Gerontology

=== Capstone Project ===
At UCLA Luskin, the capstone project is a culminating experience where students apply their academic knowledge to real-world challenges. Depending on the program, projects may be individual or team-based and often involve partnerships with community organizations, government agencies, or private-sector clients.

== Research centers ==
The Luskin School of Public Affairs houses the following research centers:

Luskin Center for Innovation

The UCLA Luskin Center for Innovation advances effective and equitable solutions to pressing environmental challenges through actionable research that engages scholars, policymakers, and communities. Focusing on issues from climate change to clean water and air, the Center produces high-quality, unbiased research with national and global relevance while mentoring approximately 50 students annually through research, fellowships, and civic engagement opportunities.

The Ralph and Goldy Lewis Center for Regional Policy Studies

The Ralph & Goldy Lewis Center for Regional Policy Studies conducts research on housing affordability and transportation equity in Los Angeles, with a focus on how these issues affect marginalized and underserved communities. Their work aims to inform policies and interventions that promote more inclusive, sustainable, and equitable urban development.

Institute of Transportation Studies (ITS)

The UCLA Institute of Transportation Studies conducts research, education, and civic engagement on pressing transportation challenges, including access, environment, mobility, public transit, and transportation finance. As part of a UC-wide consortium and through collaborations across UCLA, ITS aims to advance innovative, data-driven solutions that improve transportation systems and communities.

Center for Policy Research on Aging

Established in 1997, the Center for Policy Research on Aging studies the major policy issues affecting our aging society including Social Security, Medicare, long-term care and the societal implications that accompany the aging of the baby boom generation and its parents. In recognition of the growing diversity of the elderly population, CPRA focuses special attention on policy issues as they affect Latino, African-American, Asian and other ethnic populations. As a national, state and local resource center on aging policy, CPRA conducts research, fosters multidisciplinary collaboration among UCLA faculty, and works closely with policymakers, service providers and community groups in meeting the challenges of an aging society.

Institute on Inequality and Democracy

The UCLA Luskin Institute on Inequality and Democracy advances research and scholarship on displacement, dispossession, and systemic inequality, working in partnership with communities and social movements to challenge entrenched structures of power. Drawing inspiration from Black radical and postcolonial thought, the Institute examines both local and global inequalities to inform democratic frameworks, equitable redistribution, and civic engagement that strengthen inclusive and just societies.

The Latino Policy & Politics Institute

The UCLA Latino Policy & Politics Institute (LPPI) advances research, advocacy, and leadership development to address critical policy challenges facing Latinos and other communities of color, ensuring their voices are represented in policymaking. Through data-driven analysis, community partnerships, and policy interventions, LPPI promotes equitable opportunities, accountability, and meaningful participation in American democracy.

The Center for Neighborhood Knowledge (CNK)

The UCLA Center for Neighborhood Knowledge conducts research on the socioeconomic dynamics of neighborhoods and their regional context, with a focus on diversity, disparities, and marginalized communities. By translating empirical findings into actionable policies and programs, the Center aims to empower community members, leaders, and organizations to drive positive social change.

Latin American Cities Initiative

The UCLA Luskin Latin American Cities Initiative fosters knowledge networks among students, educators, and professionals in urban planning and policy across South, Central, and North America. Through teaching, public events, research opportunities, internships, and international collaborations, the initiative connects UCLA students with Latin American scholars and institutions to advance research, learning, and professional exchange.

UCLA Voting Rights Project

The University of California, Los Angeles Voting Rights Project (UCLA VRP) was founded in August 2019. The UCLA VRP started out as a project within the UCLA Latino Politics & Policy Institute, and as of July 1, 2024, became an independent research center housed within the Luskin School of Public Affairs.

Unique programs include a Social Justice Initiative, Senior Fellows program, and Global Public Affairs.

== Notable Current and Former Luskin Faculty ==
- Donald Shoup, Distinguished Professor Emeritus of Urban Planning; internationally recognized for his research on parking policy and author of The High Cost of Free Parking.
- Michael Dukakis, Former Massachusetts governor and 1988 U.S. presidential nominee; former visiting professor in public policy.
- Zev Yaroslavsky, Longtime Los Angeles politician and former County Supervisor; currently directs the UCLA Luskin Los Angeles Initiative.
- Anastasia Loukaitou‑Sideris, Distinguished Professor of Urban Planning, former department chair, and Interim Dean of Luskin.
- Fernando Torres‑Gil, Professor of Social Welfare and Public Policy; former U.S. Assistant Secretary for Aging
- Barbara J. Nelson, Professor Emerita of Public Policy and former Dean of Public Policy; known for her work on social policy.
- Randall Crane, Professor Emeritus of Urban Planning, long-serving faculty in planning and transportation.
- John Friedmann, Professor Emeritus; foundational planning theorist and one of the school's early academic leaders.
- Michael Storper, Distinguished Professor of Economic Geography; internationally recognized for research on regional development, urban economics, and global cities.
- Michael A. Stoll, Economist and Professor of Public Policy; known for his research on incarceration and labor economics.
- Kenichi Ohmae, Former Professor and Dean, business strategist known for the "3Cs" model
- Rick Tuttle (MA '64, PhD '75), UCLA public policy lecturer and former LA City Controller known for his emphasis on democratic engagement.
- Jorja Leap, Professor of Social Welfare and Public Policy; anthropologist and community expert known for her research on gangs, violence prevention, community resilience, and urban social policy

== Notable Luskin Alumni ==
- Isaac Bryan (MPP '18), California State Assemblymember; recognized for his work on environmental justice, housing equity, and criminal-legal reform.
- Nathalie Rayes (MPP '99), former U.S. ambassador to Croatia, former President & CEO of Latino Victory.
- Harmony (Dust) Grillo (MSW '05), Social activist for women working in the sex industry; founder of "Treasures Ministries."
- William R. "Rusty" Bailey III (MPP '99), Former mayor of Riverside.
- Manan Trivedi (MPP '07), President of the National Physicians Alliance, former battalion surgeon with the U.S. Marine Corps.
- Celeste Drake (MPP '02), Deputy Director-General of the International Labour Organization.
- Caroline Menjivar (MSW '18), member of the California State Senate.
- Nelson Esparza (MPP '15), Fresno City Council Member.
