= Erimtan Archaeology and Arts Museum =

Archaeology museum in Ankara, Turkey

- Erimtan Arkeoloji ve Sanat Müzesi
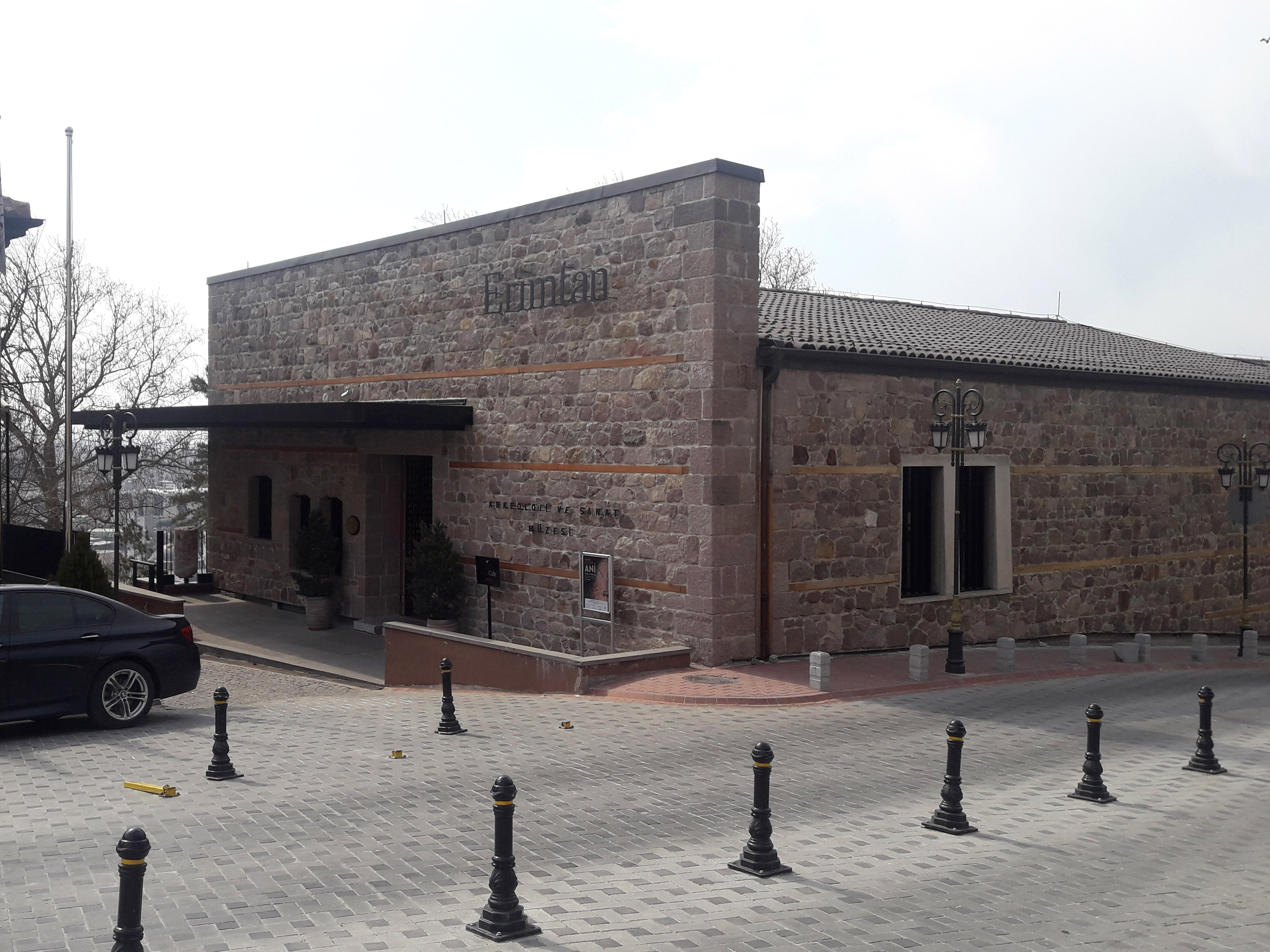
- Museum building.
- Established: 2015
- Location: Altındağ, Ankara, Turkey
- Coordinates: 39°56′17″N 32°51′47″E
- Founder: Cultural Heritage Collectors’ Society
- Website: erimtanmuseum.org/index.php/en/

Erimtan Archaeology and Arts Museum (Turkish: Erimtan Arkeoloji ve Sanat Müzesi) is an archaeology museum and music venue in Ankara, Turkey.

== Location ==
The museum is located at Gözcü St. 10 in Kale neighborhood of Altındağ ilçe (district) in Ankara, close to the Ankara Castle at 39°56′17″N 32°51′47″E. It is between Museum of Anatolian Civilizations and Çengelhan Rahmi M. Koç Museum.

== History ==
Erimtan Museum was established in 2015 by a private society named "Cultural Heritage Collectors’ Society" (Turkish: Kültür Varlıkları Koleksiyoncular Derneği), which was founded in 1996. The museum was named after the founder of the society Yüksel Erimtan, an engineer and an archaeology enthusiast, who endowed his private collection to the museum. The museum collection consists of nearly two thousand portable artifacts under the supervision of the Museum of Anatolian Civilizations. Almost all of the artifacts has Anatolian origin. The collection covers a period of time extending from three thousand BC to the Byzantine times.

== Museum building ==
The museum is housed in three old Ankara buildings, which belong to the Ministry of Culture and Tourism. The society leased the buildings, and spent ₺ 10 million for the renovation of the buildings. There are also a conference room, a cafeteria and a bookstore in the museum building.

== Tuesday concerts ==
Concerts are a part of museum activities. On Tuesdays, a concert is held in the museum building. Each season, about 16 concerts are held.

== Gallery ==
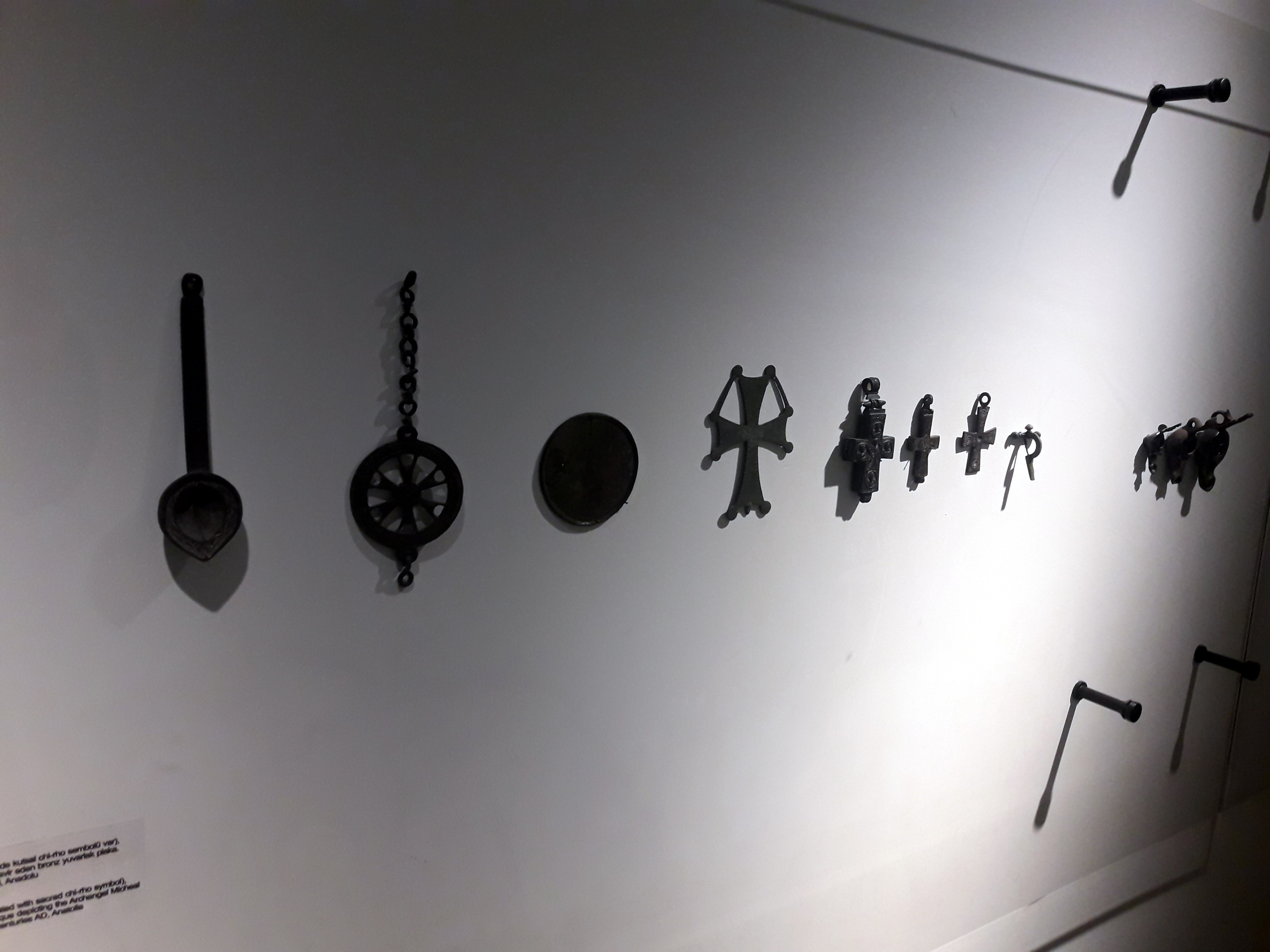
Several crosses on display

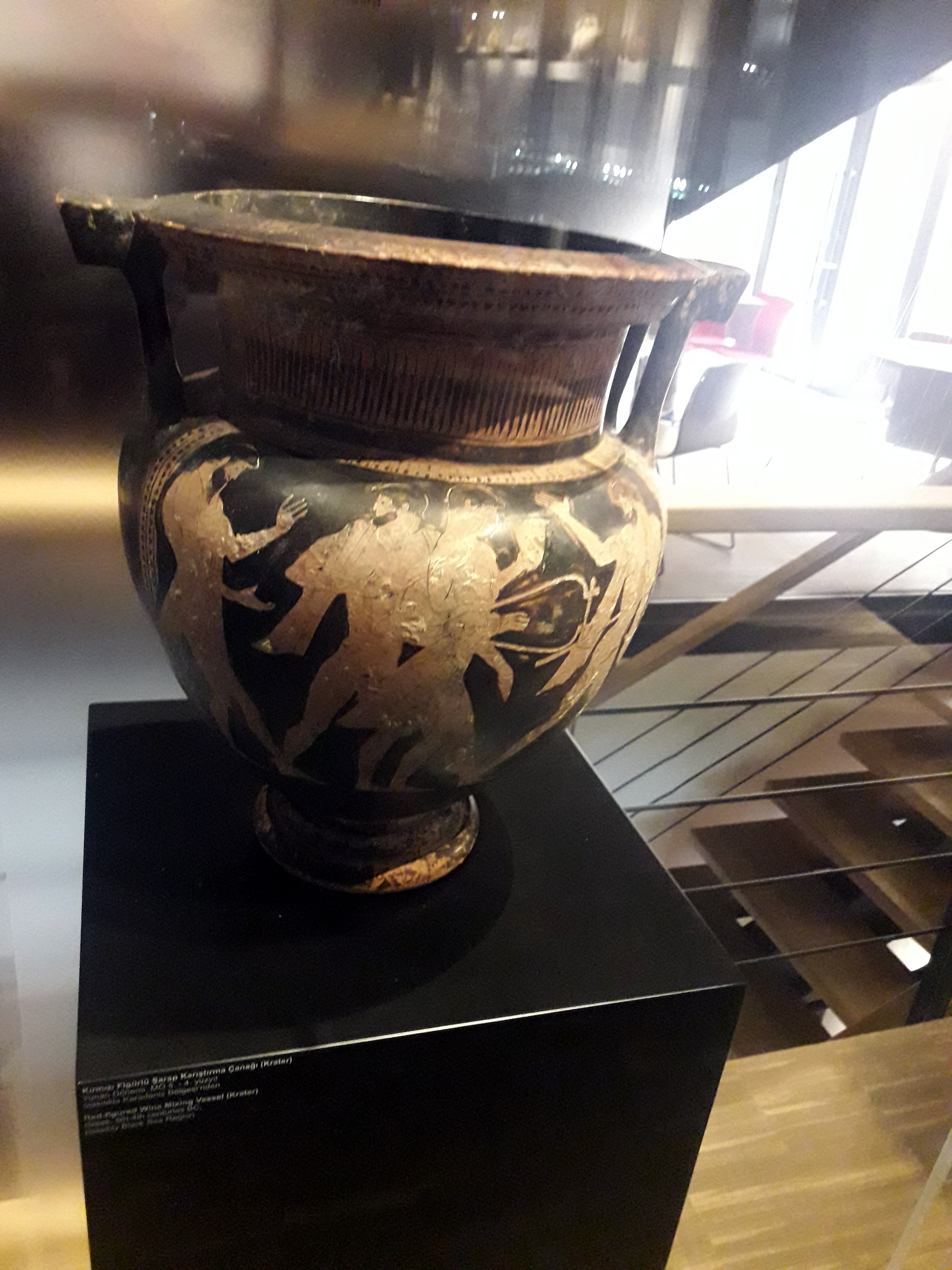
Red-figured wine mixing vessel (Krater) Ancient Greek, 5th-4th centuries BC.

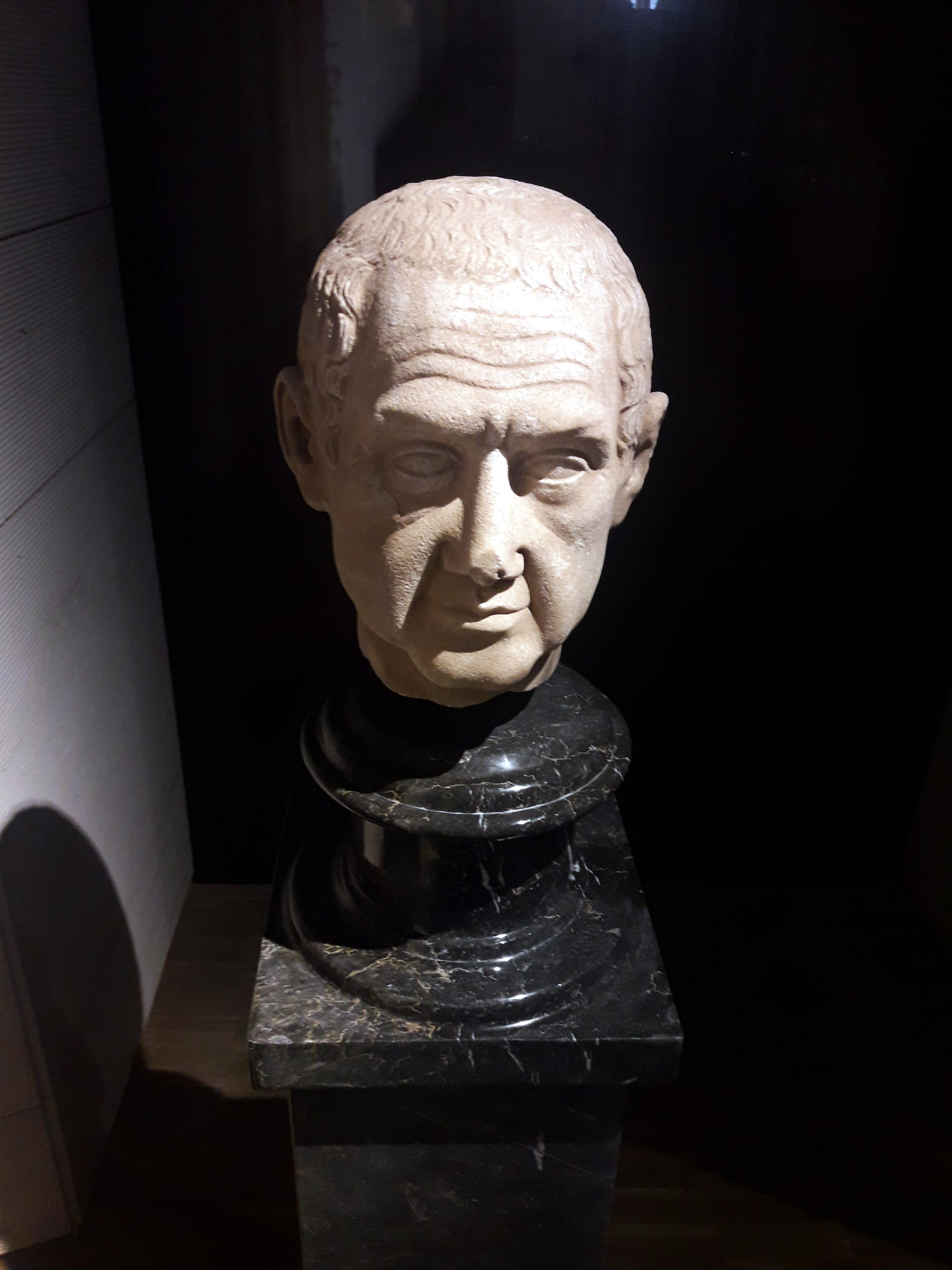
Bust of a noble man.

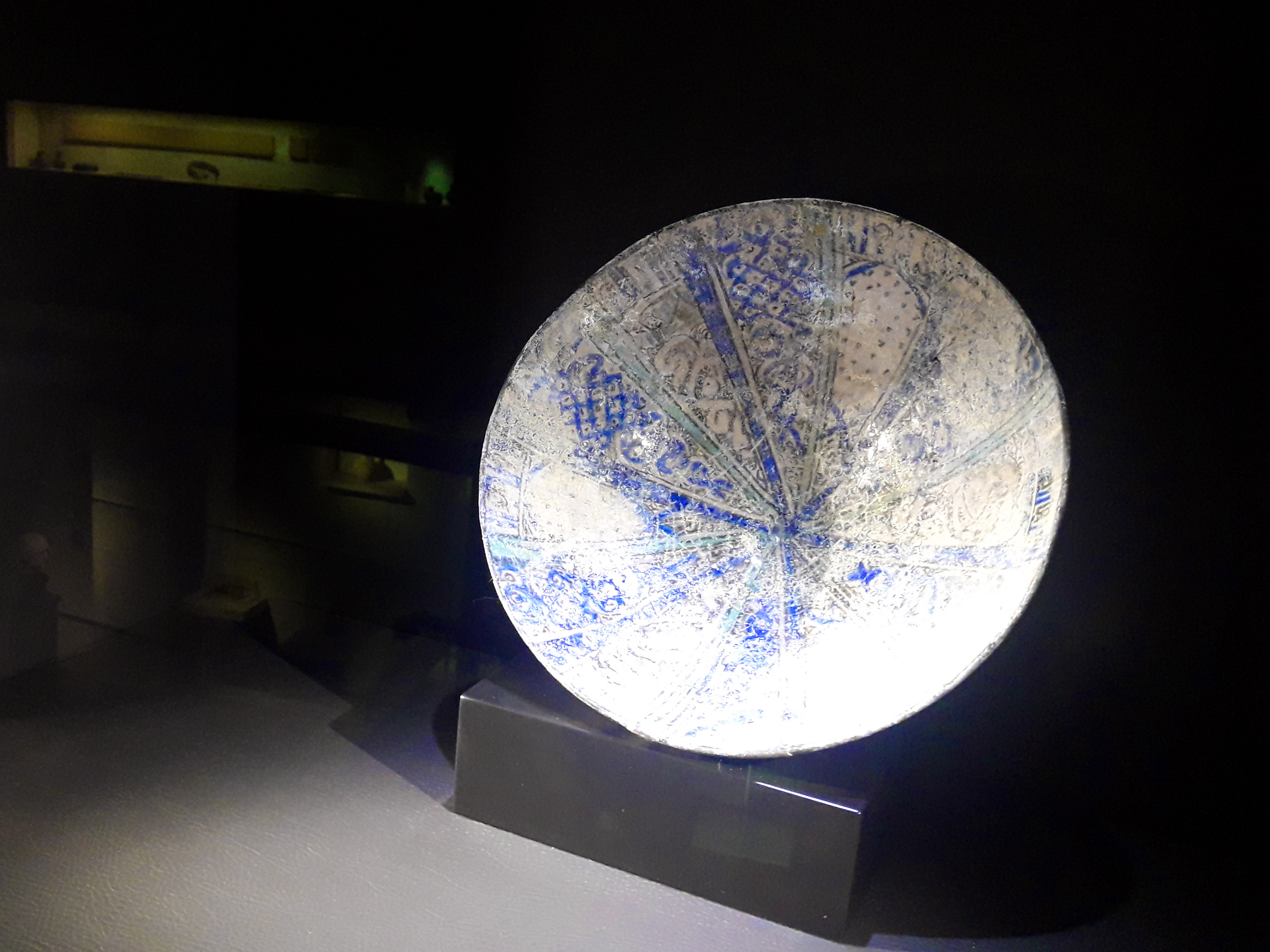
Bowl decorated with underglaze technique

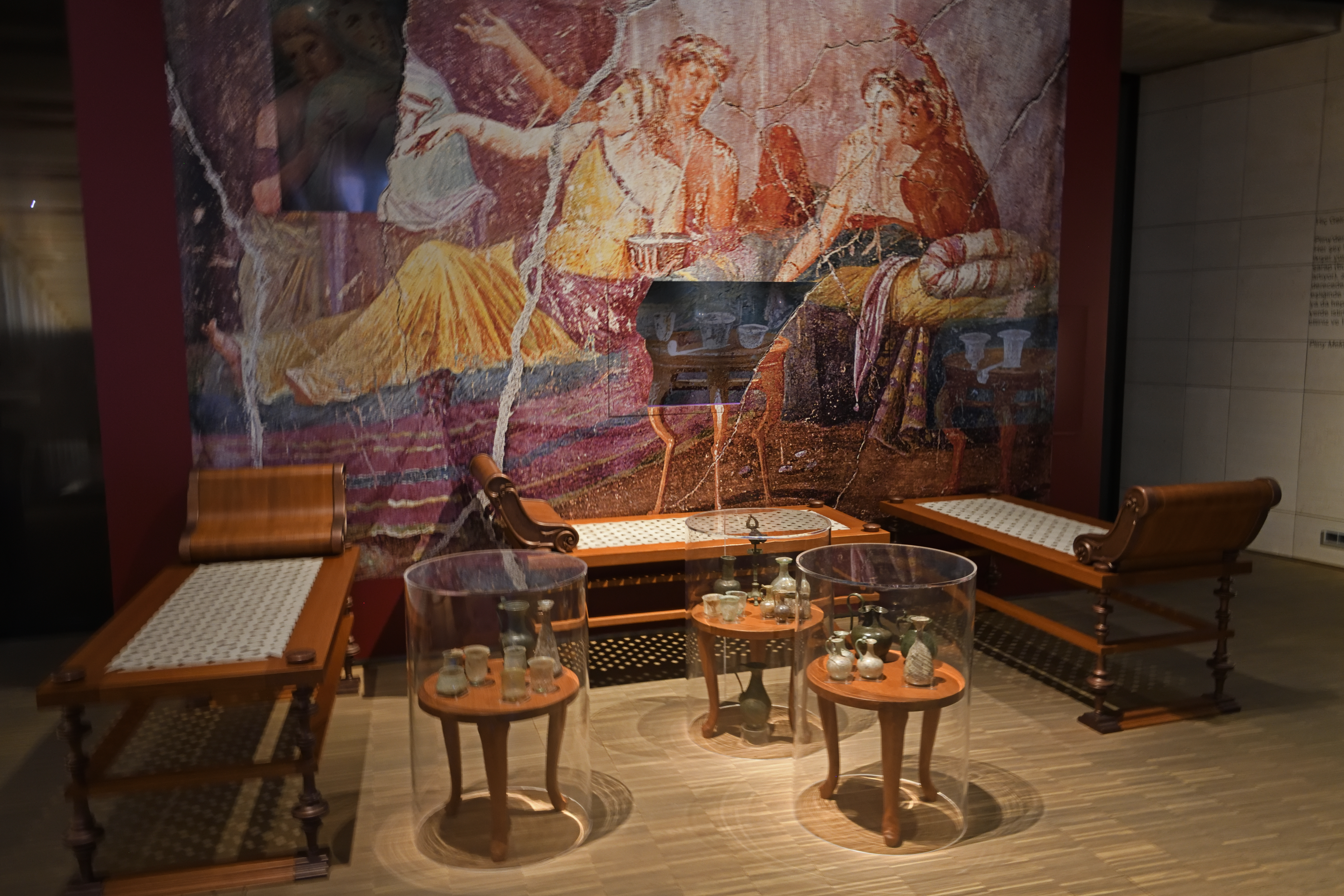
Erimtan museum Roman furniture replicas

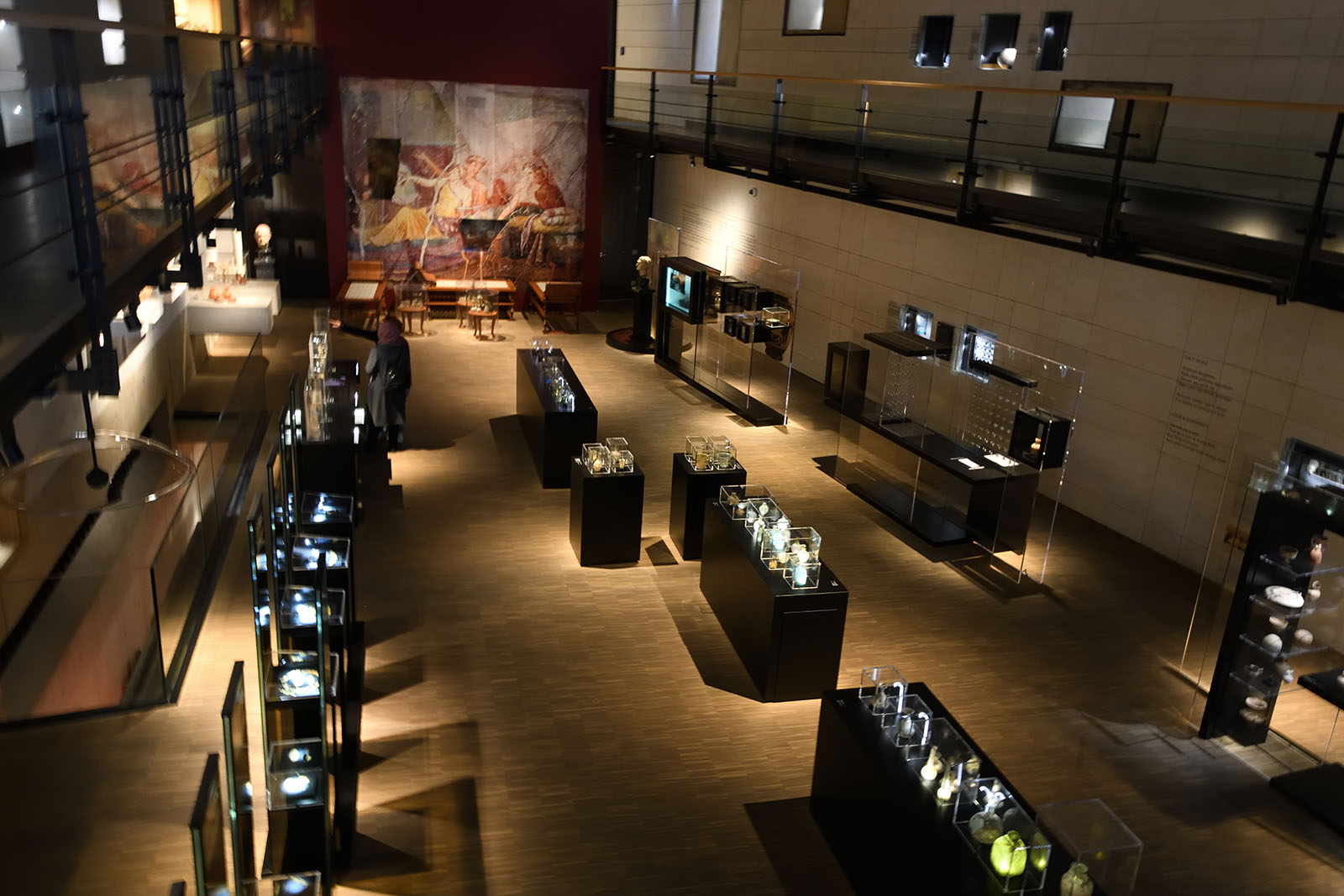
Erimtan museum View

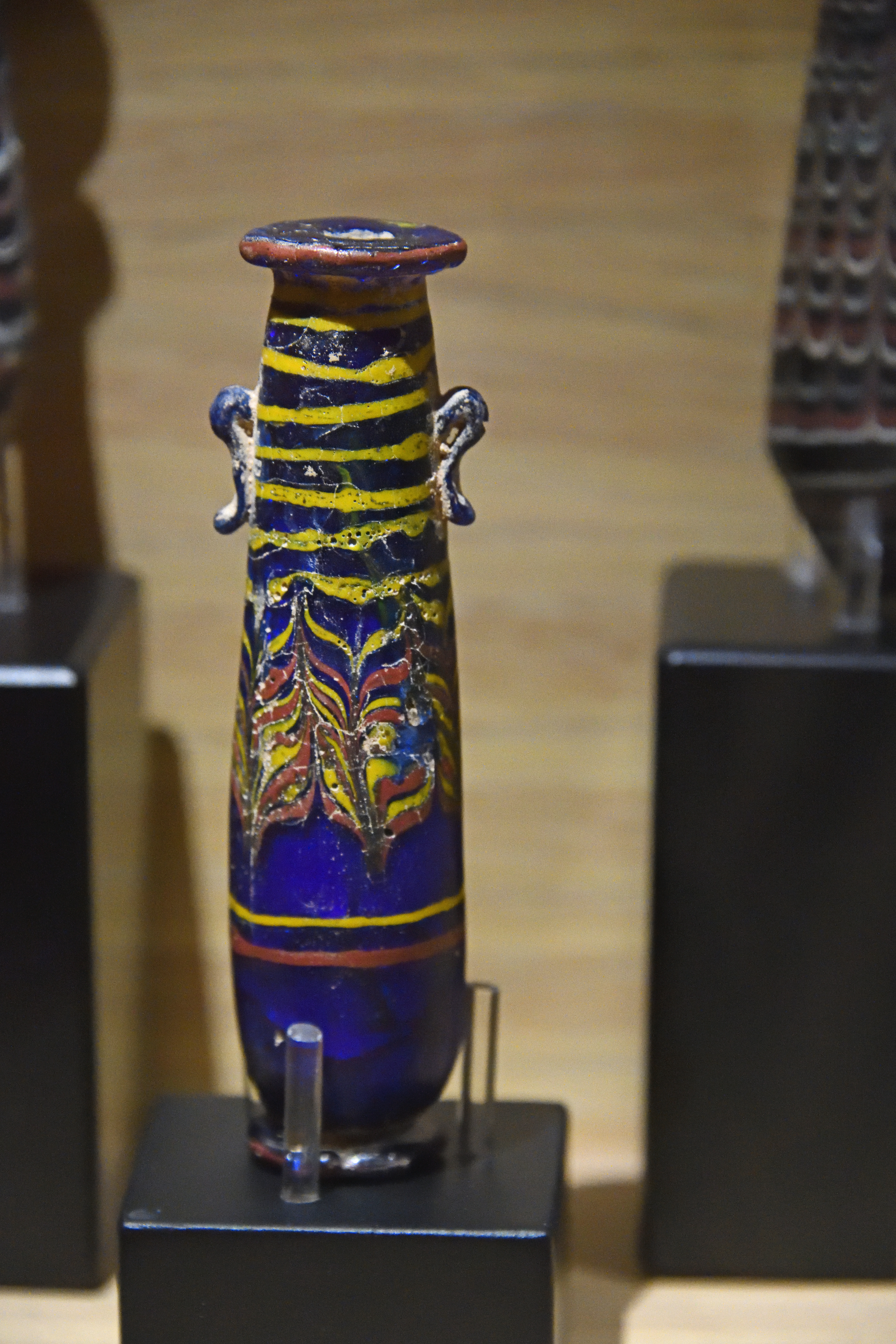
Erimtan museum Vial

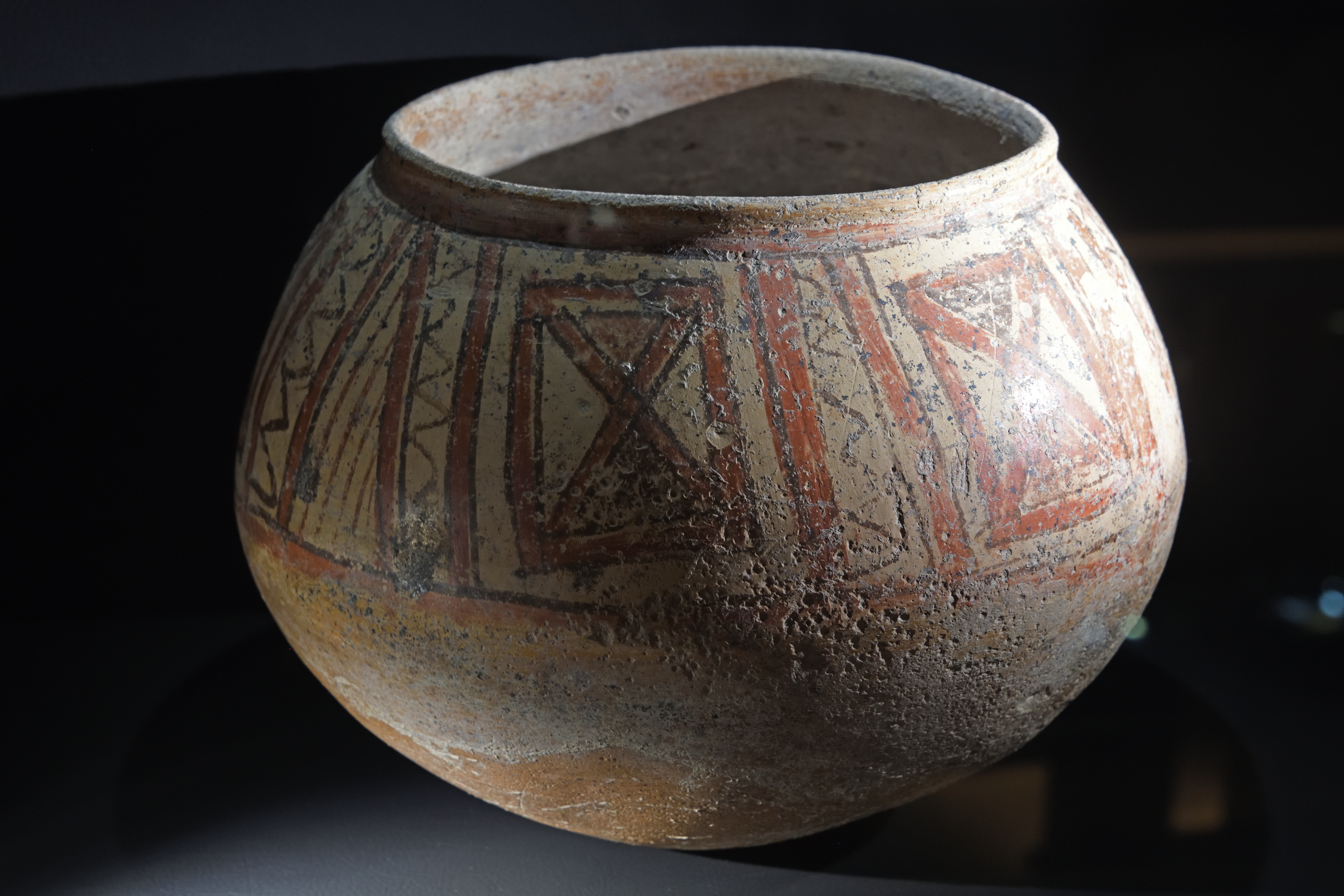
Erimtan museum Bichrome jar Van-Urmiye Painted Ware

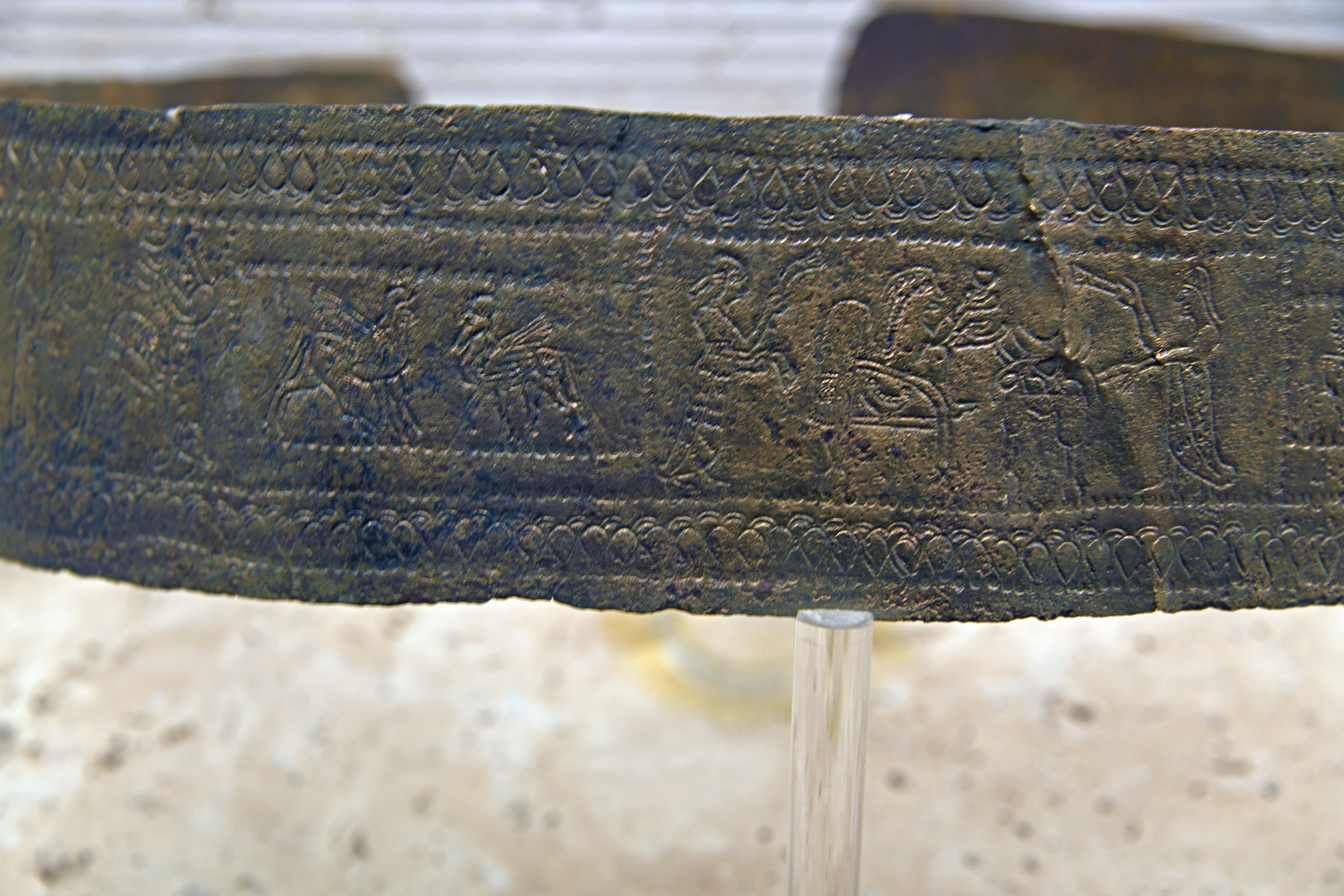
Erimtan museum Bronze belt Urartian Period

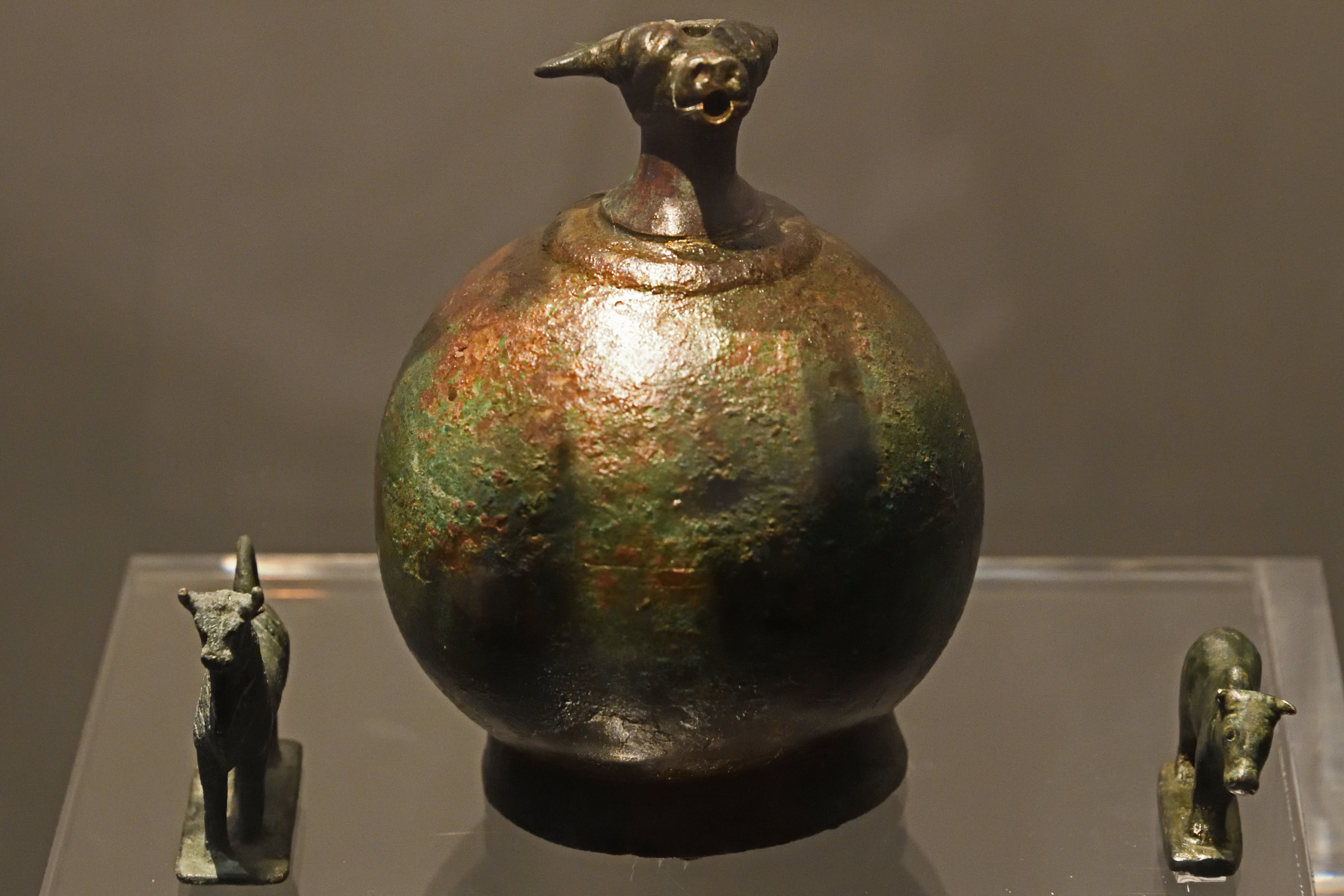
Erimtan museum Bulls

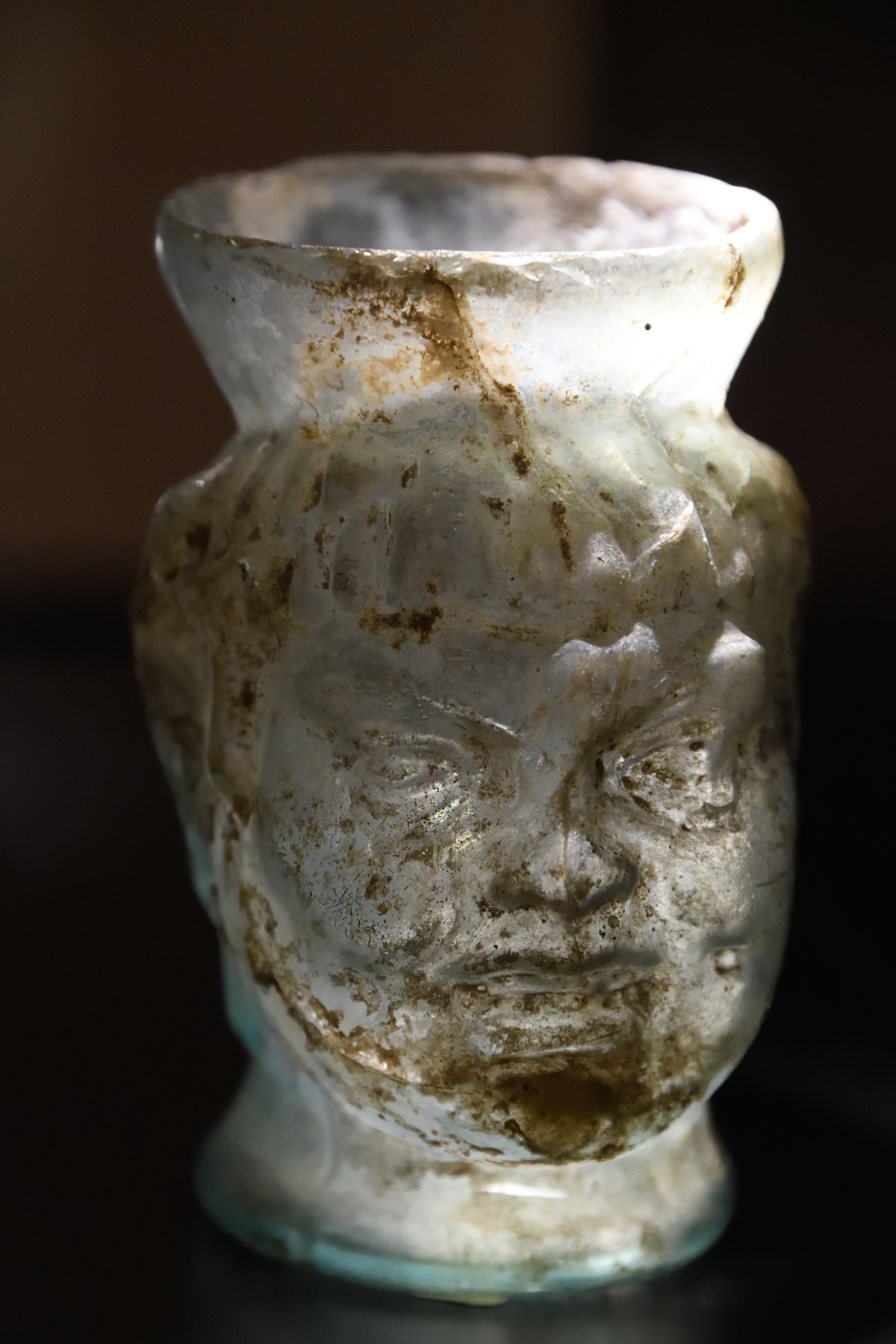
Erimtan museum Roman Glass cup

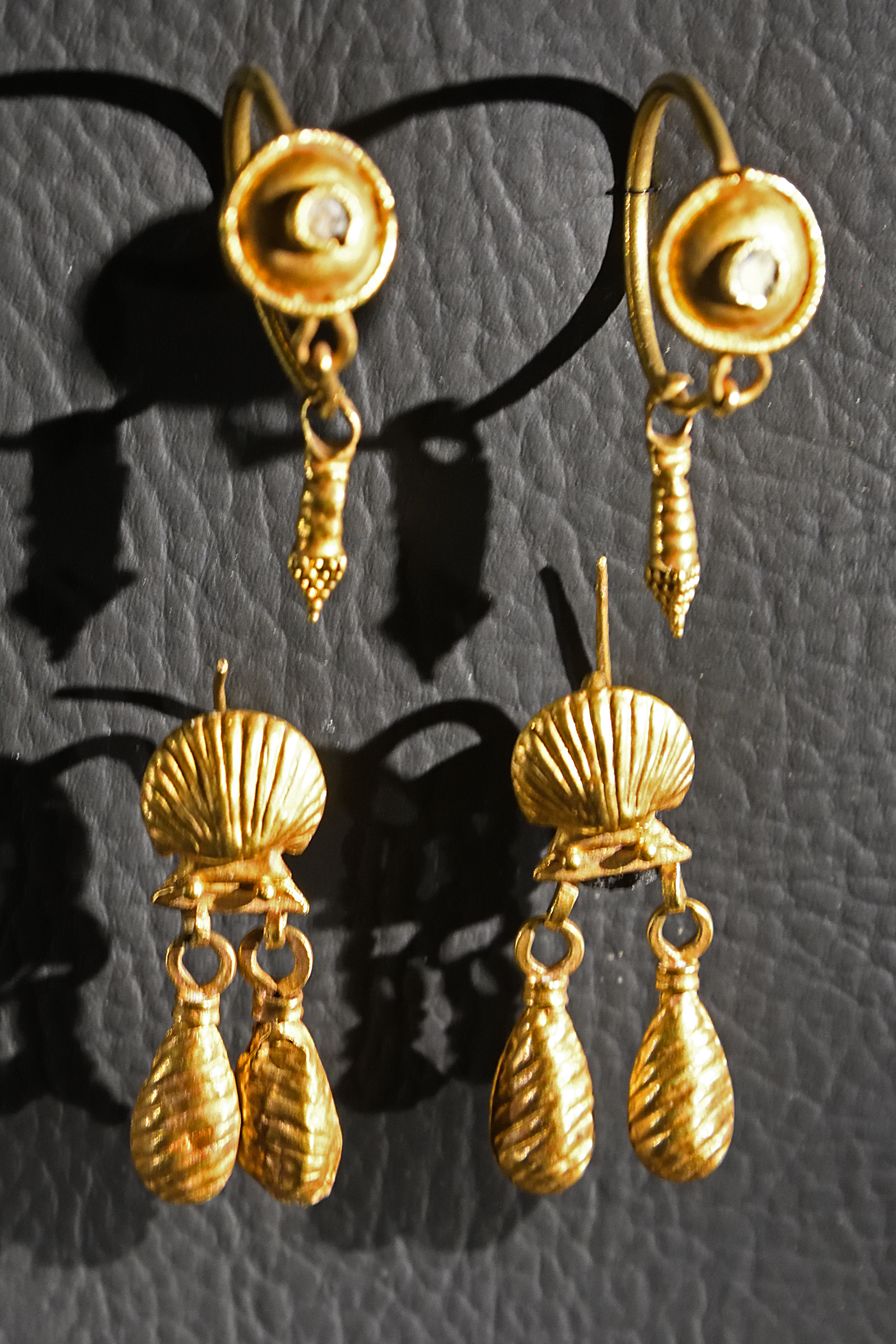
Erimtan museum Earrings in gold

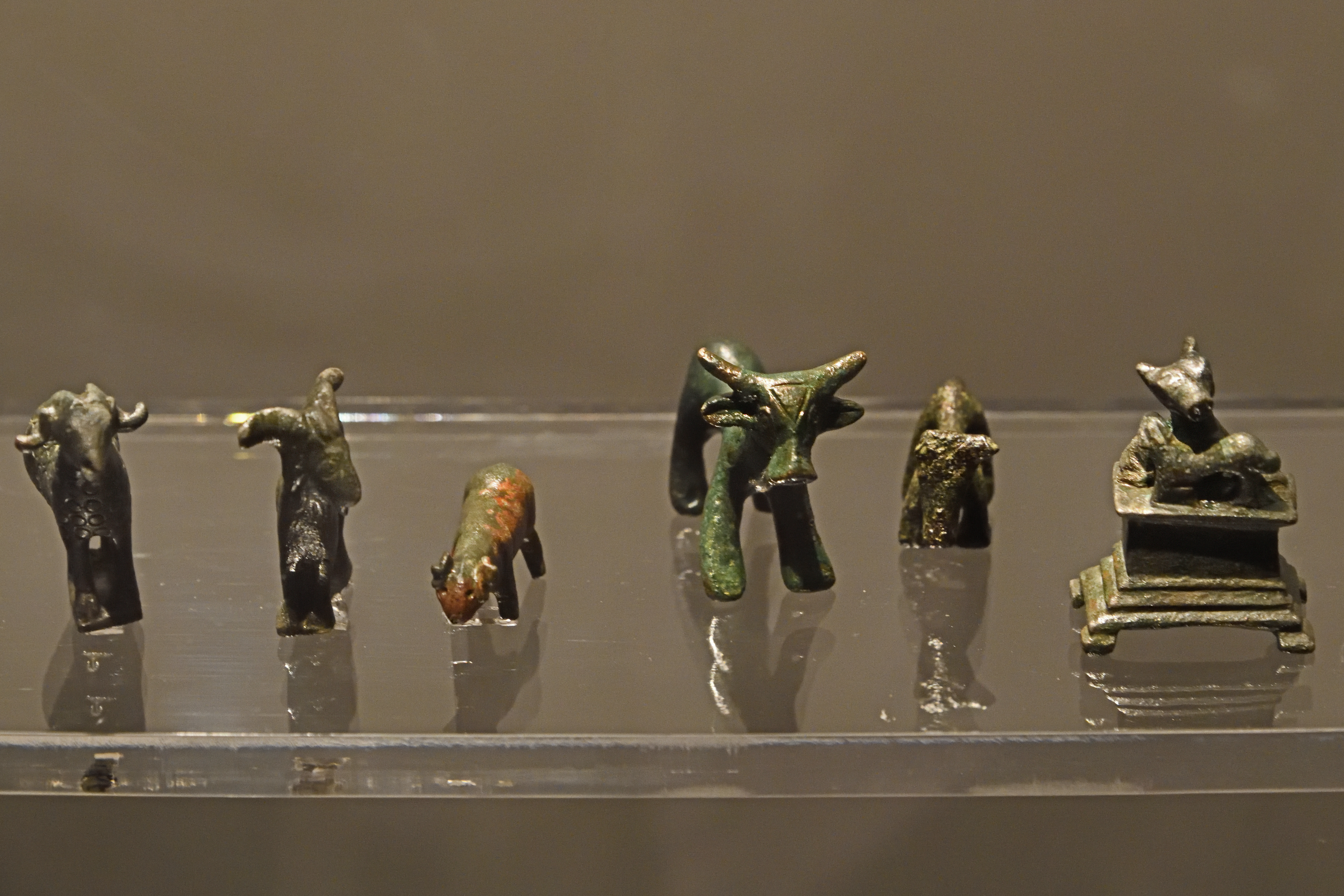
Erimtan museum Small bronze animal figurines

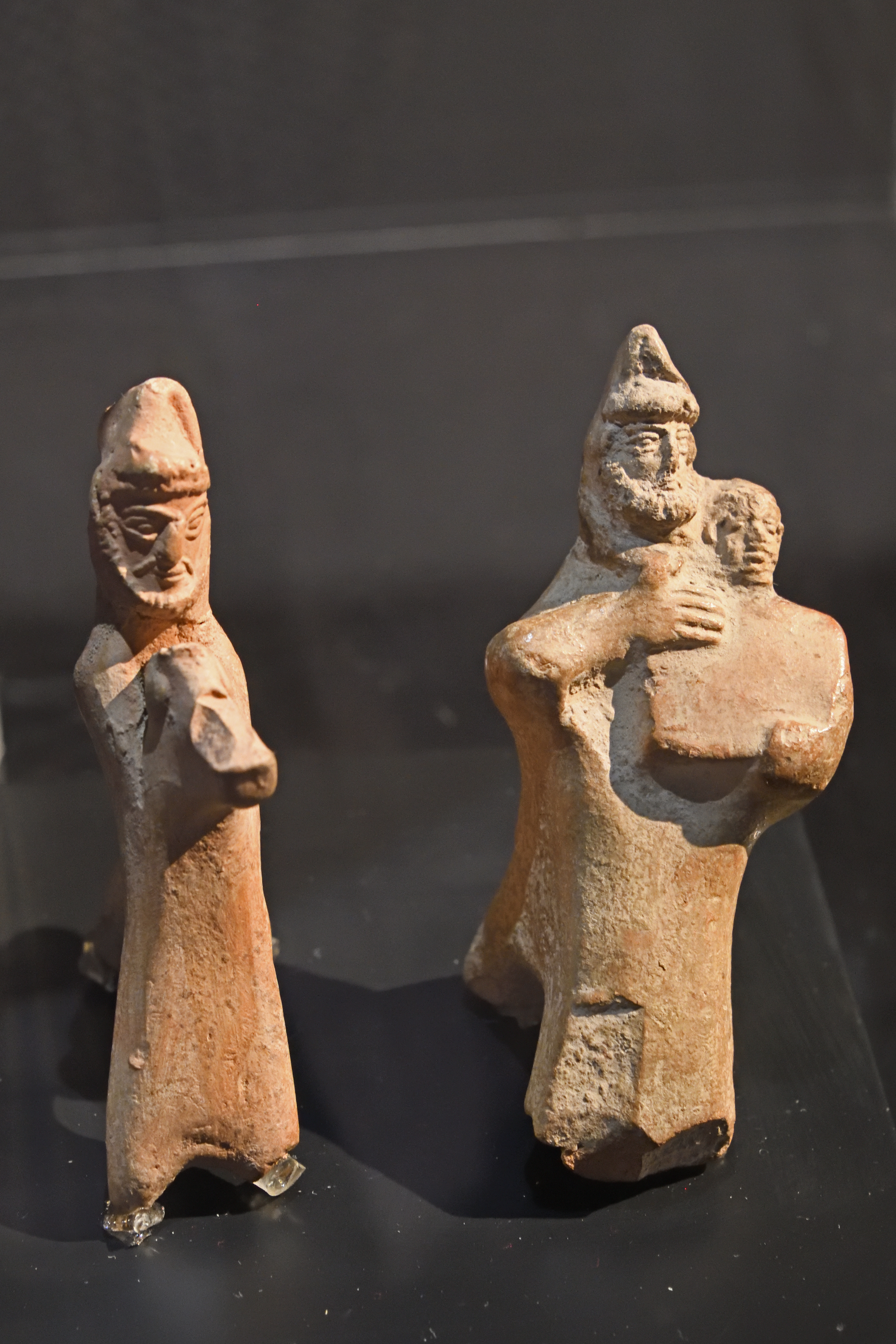
Erimtan museum Figurines Terracotta Achaemenid Persian / Hellenistic

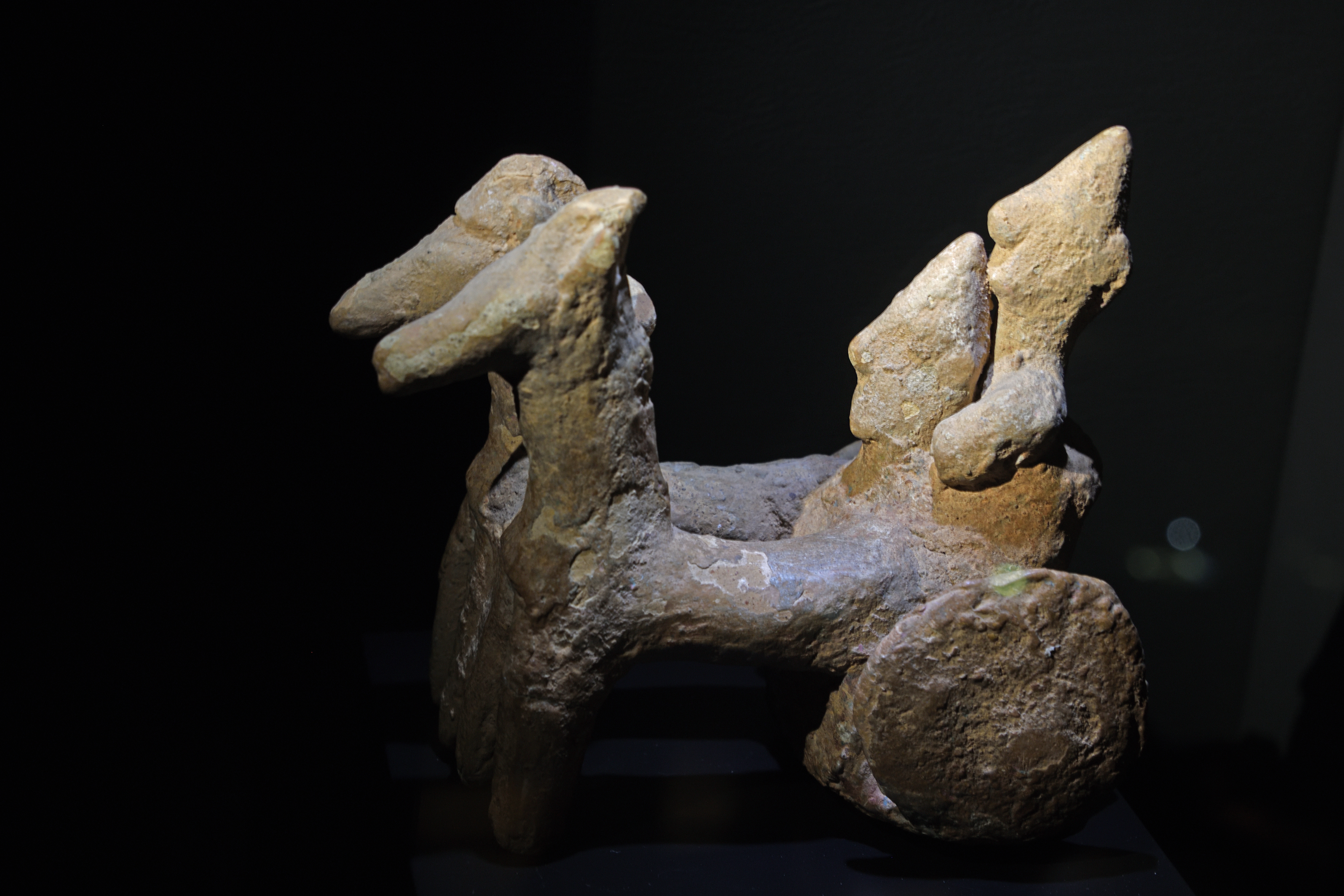
Erimtan museum Archaic Chariot model

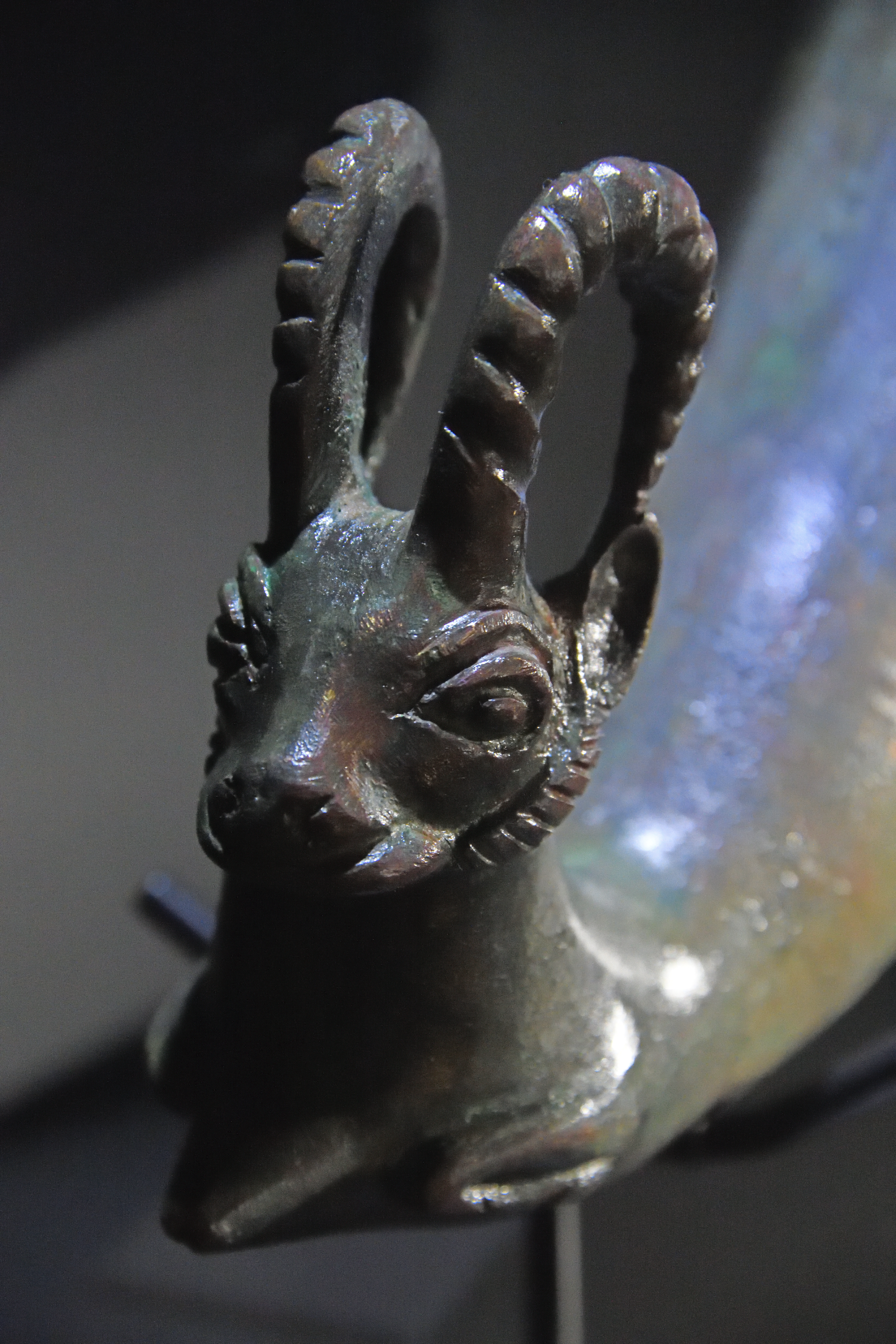
Erimtan museum Rhyton Bronze Achaemenid Persian

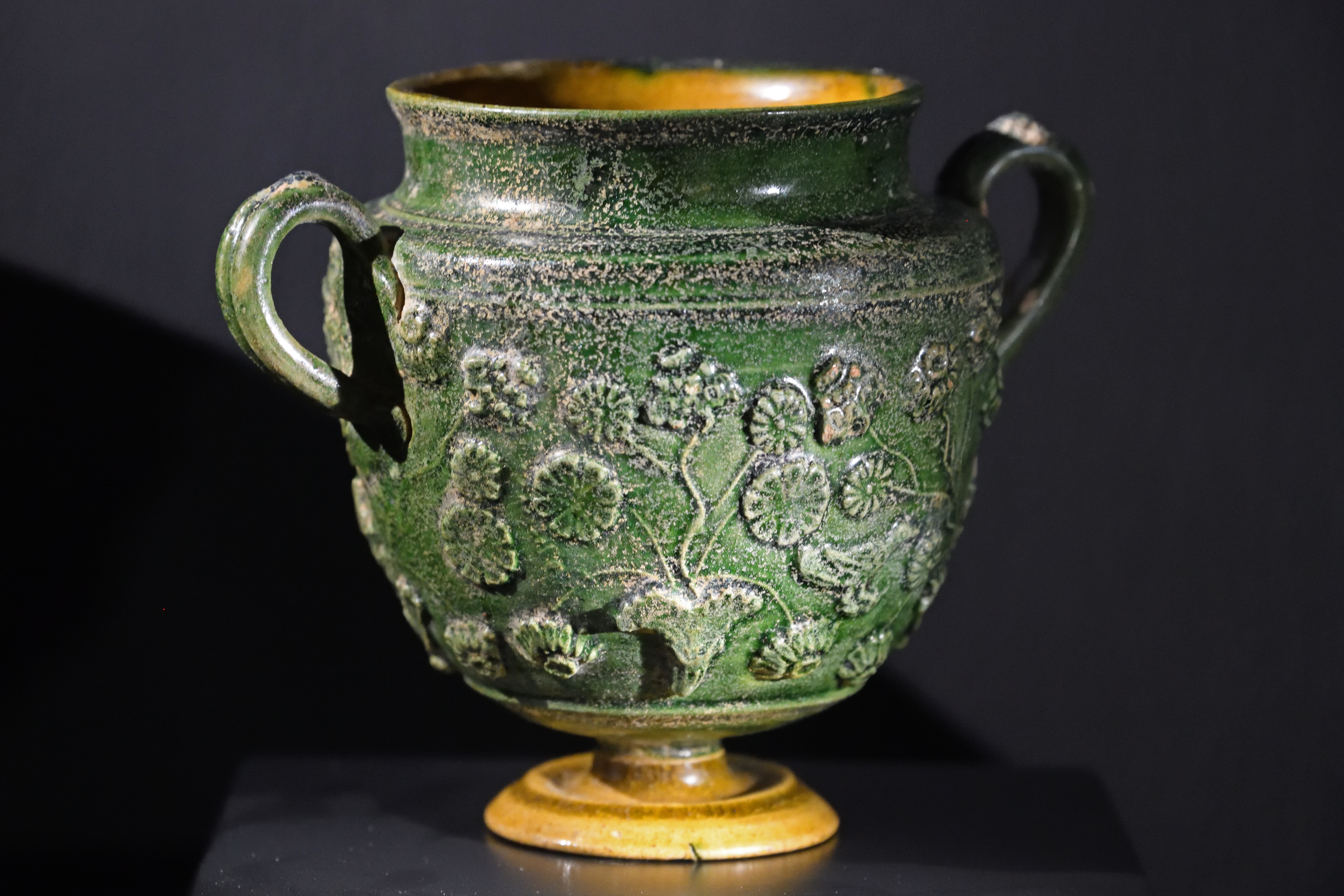
Erimtan museum Skyphos Glazed terracotta

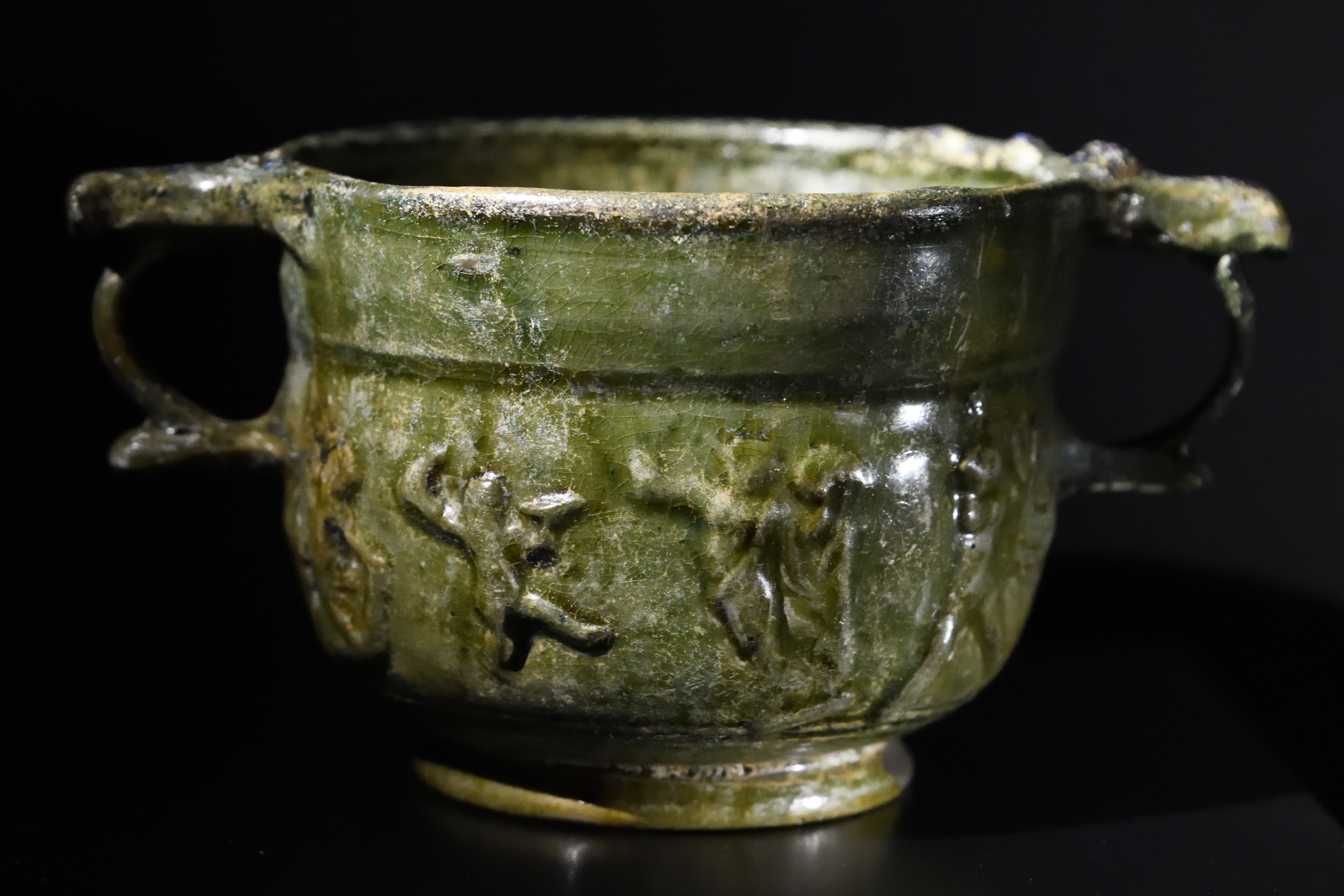
Erimtan museum Skyphos Glazed terracotta

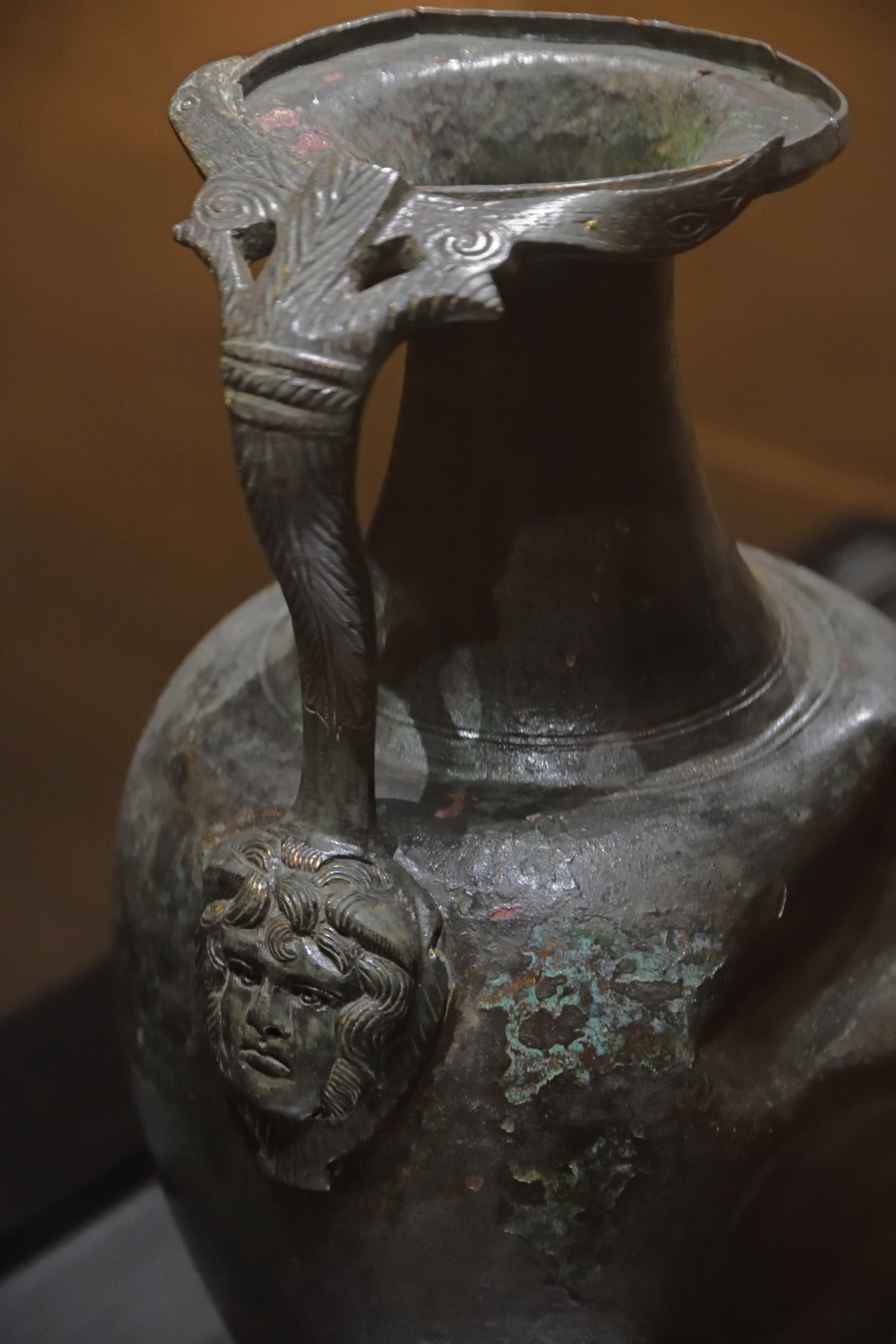
Erimtan museum Medusa handled jug

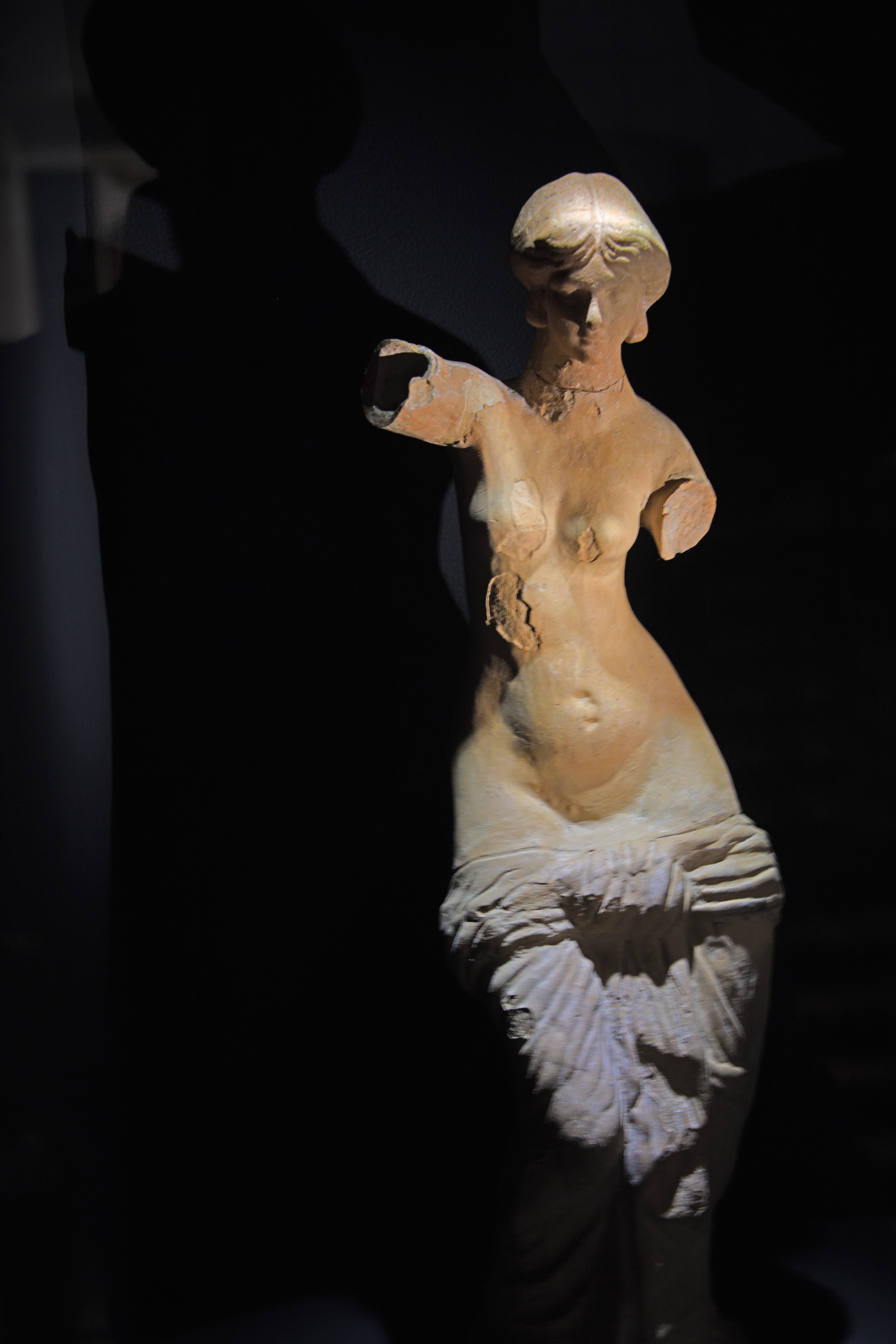
Erimtan museum Venus statuette
