= Altınpark =

Public park in Turkey

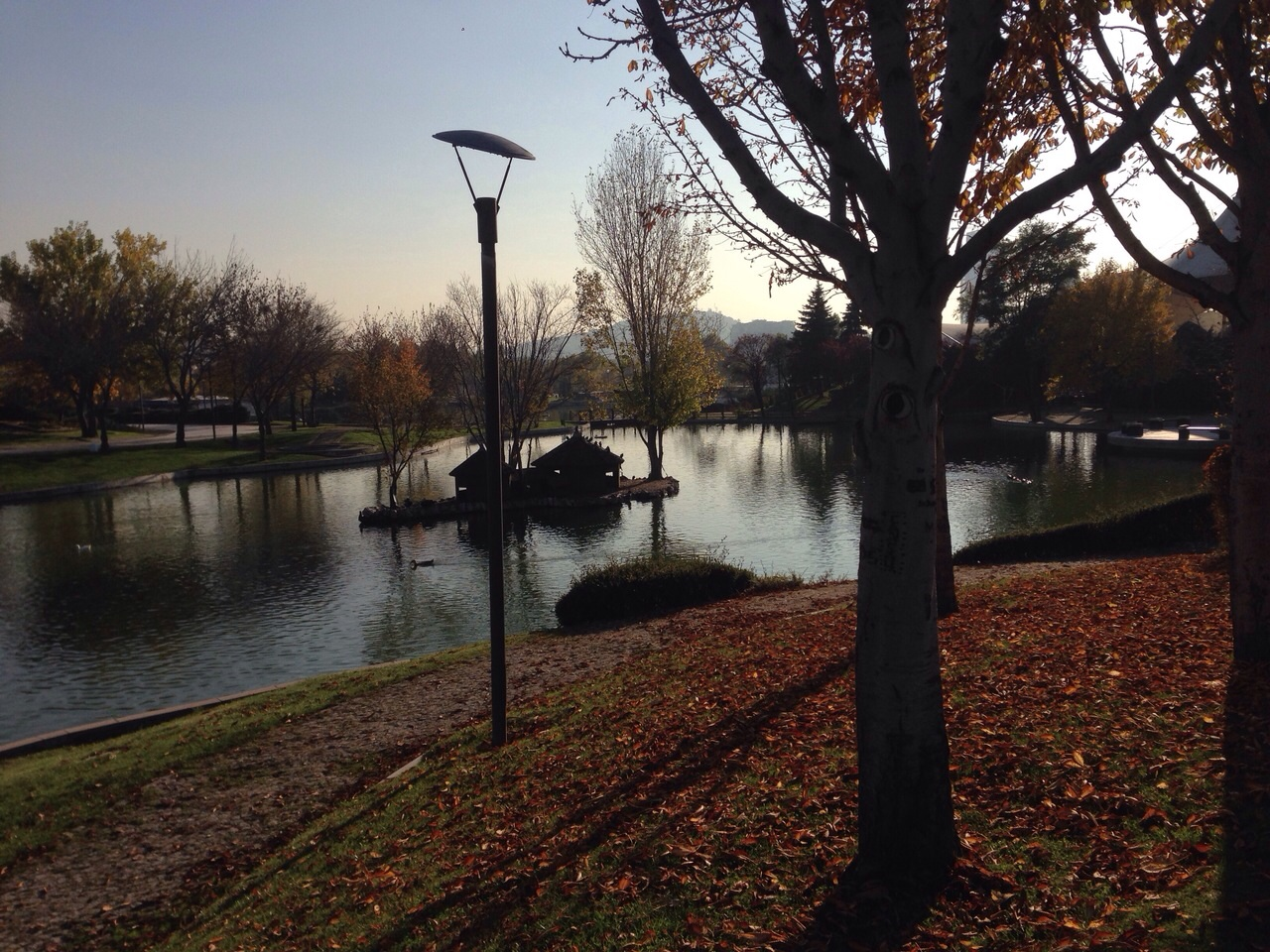
- A view of Altınpark (1997)

- Location within Turkey
- Interactive map of Altınpark
- Location: Altındağ, Ankara, Turkey
- Coordinates: 39.58°N 32.53°E
- Area: 64 ha (160 acres)
- Created: 1985; 41 years ago
- Website: ANFA, the management

Altınpark (literally Golden Park) is a public park in Ankara, Turkey

== Geography ==
Altınpark is in Altındağ district of Ankara, situated on the way connecting Ankara to Ankara airport. The park area is 64 ha (160 acres)

== History ==
Up to 1977, the park area was a golf course. In 1985, it was transformed into a public park by the metropolitan municipality of Ankara.

== The park today ==
The park is now operated by ANFA, a subsidiary of Ankara metropolitan municipality. 211,160 m^{2} (252,550 yd^{2}) area is reserved for the green area and 9,302 m^{2} (11,125 yd^{2}) is reserved for the flower beds where flowers and seedlings are put up for sale. The artificial pond is 32,700 m^{2} (39,100 yd^{2}). Among the buildings, Feza Gürsey Science Center is one of the best known building. Olympic swimming pool, kindergarten and summer schools, musical and lightened water exhibitions, game and entertainment areas, amphitheatres, crashing boats, electrical excursion cars, mini excursion train, and horse carts are among the other activities. There are also kiosks and restaurants within the park.

== Gallery ==
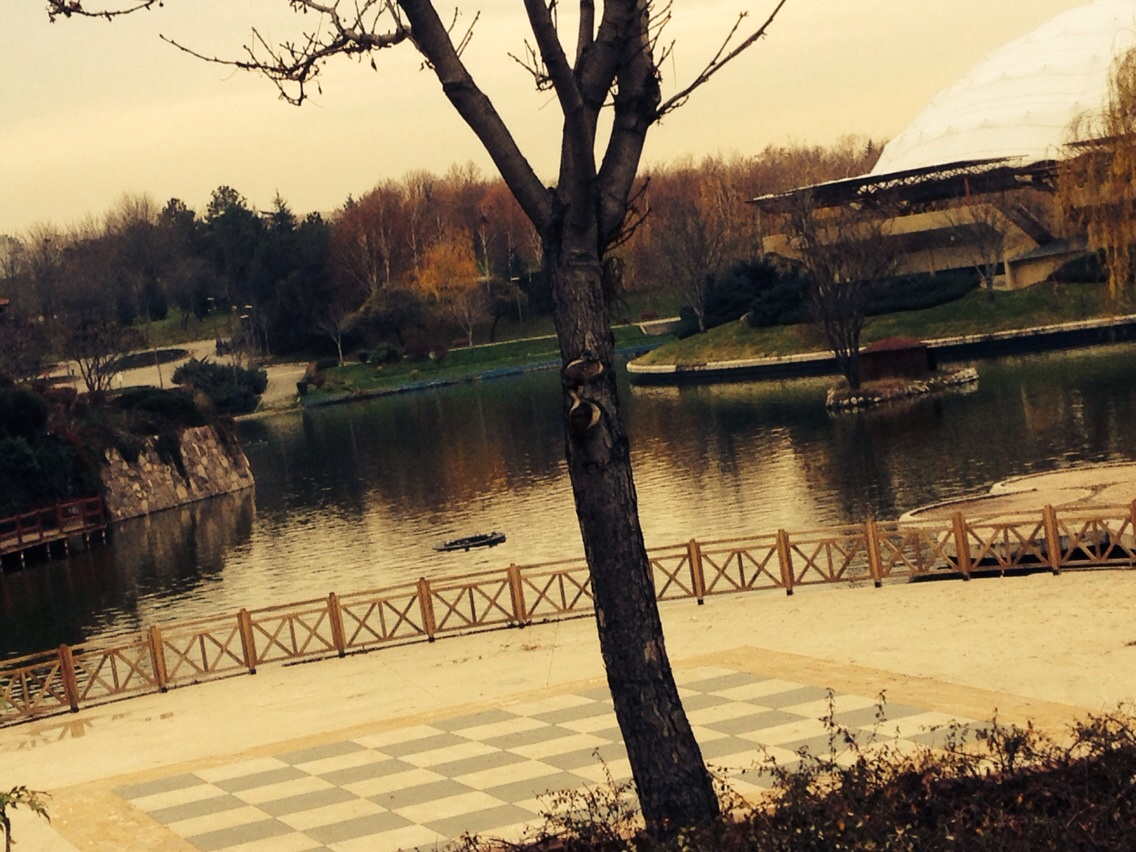

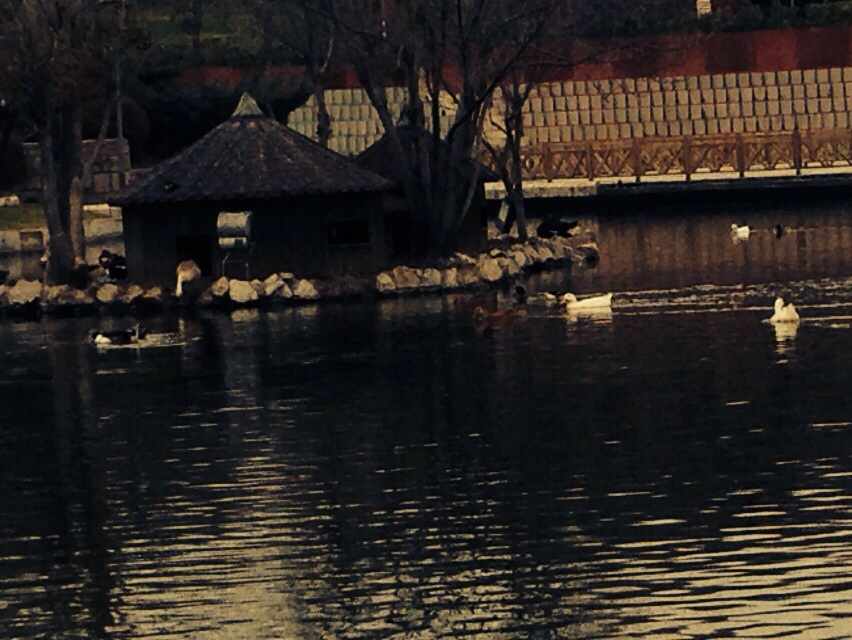

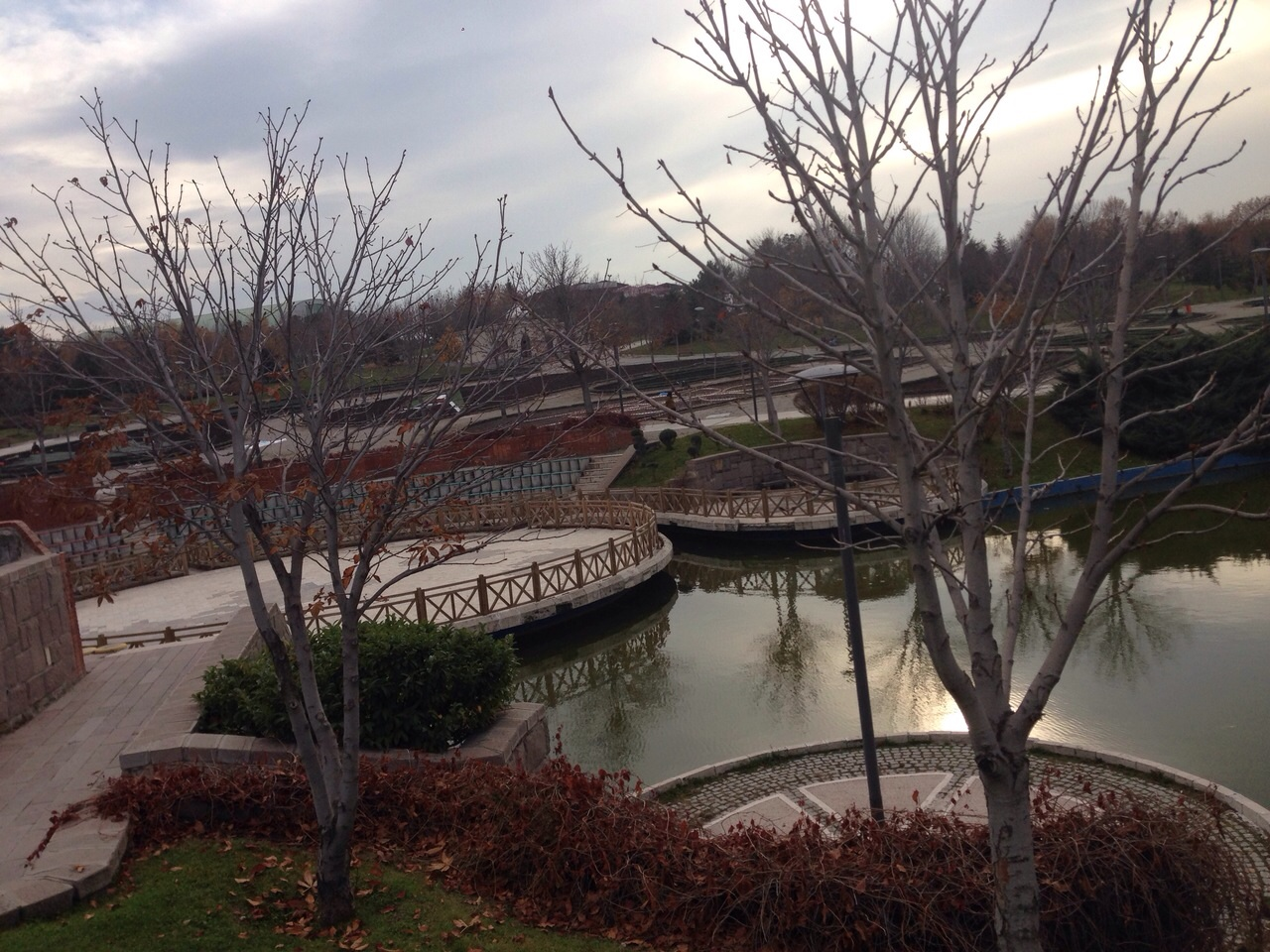

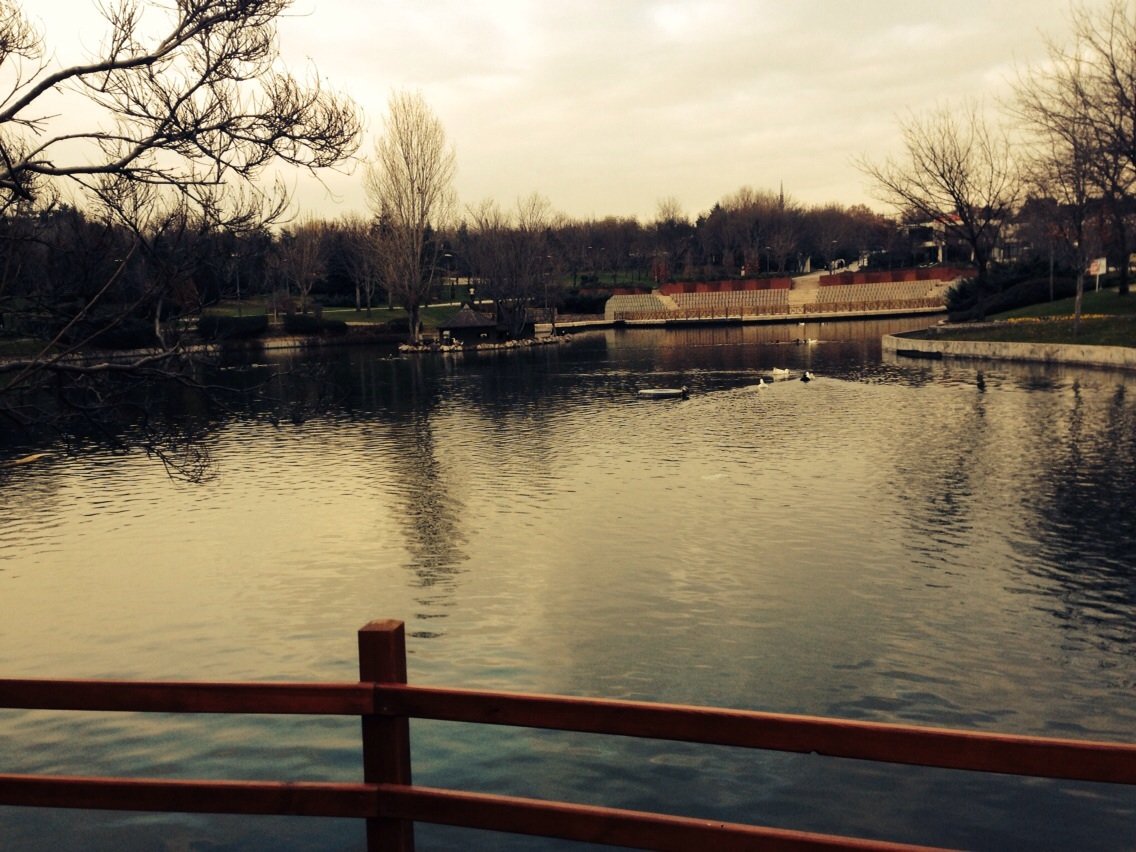

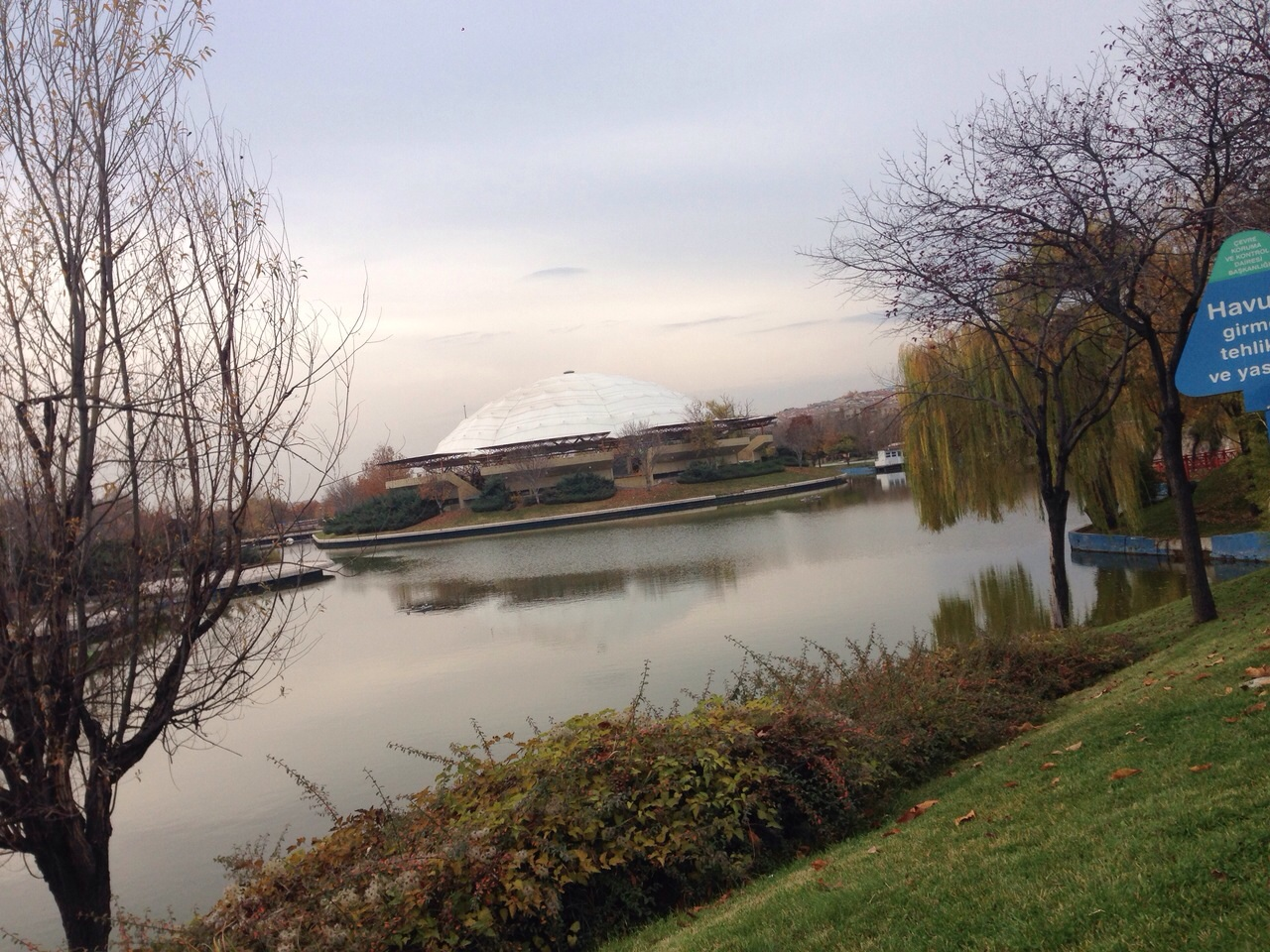

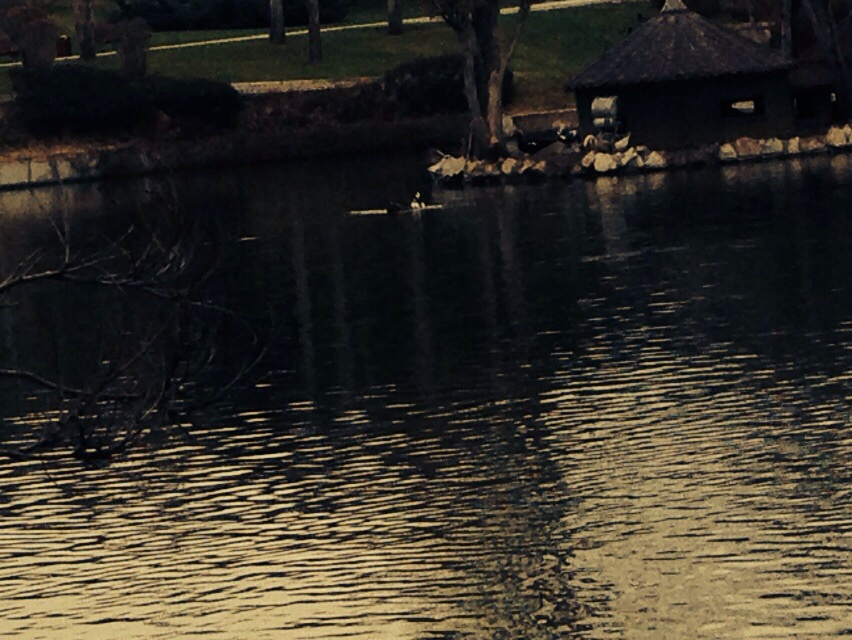
