= General Directorate of Prisons and Detention Houses =

Turkish prison and probation institution

- Ceza ve Tevkifevleri Genel Müdürlüğü

Agency overview
- Formed: 1923
- Headquarters: Ankara, Turkey
- Agency executive: Yılmaz Çiftçi, Genel manager
- Parent department: Ministry of Justice
- Website: cte.adalet.gov.tr

In Turkey, the General Directorate of Prisons and Detention Houses (Turkish: Ceza ve Tevkifevleri Genel Müdürlüğü; often abbreviated as CTE) is an institution affiliated with the Ministry of Justice and responsible for controlling prisons.

== History ==
The institution was established in 1923 and is responsible for managing, supervising and monitoring detention centers, as well as doing maintenance and addressing the needs of convicts and detainees. Its headquarters is located in Altındağ, Ankara.

== Affiliated units ==
=== Central agency ===
- Security and Execution Department
- Support Services Department
- Personnel Training Department
- Health and Press Public Relations Department
- Foreign Relations Department
- Training and Improvement Department
- Probation Department
- Personnel Department
- Board of Controllers Department

=== Provincial organizations ===
- Criminal and detention centers
