= Altındağ =

- District and municipality
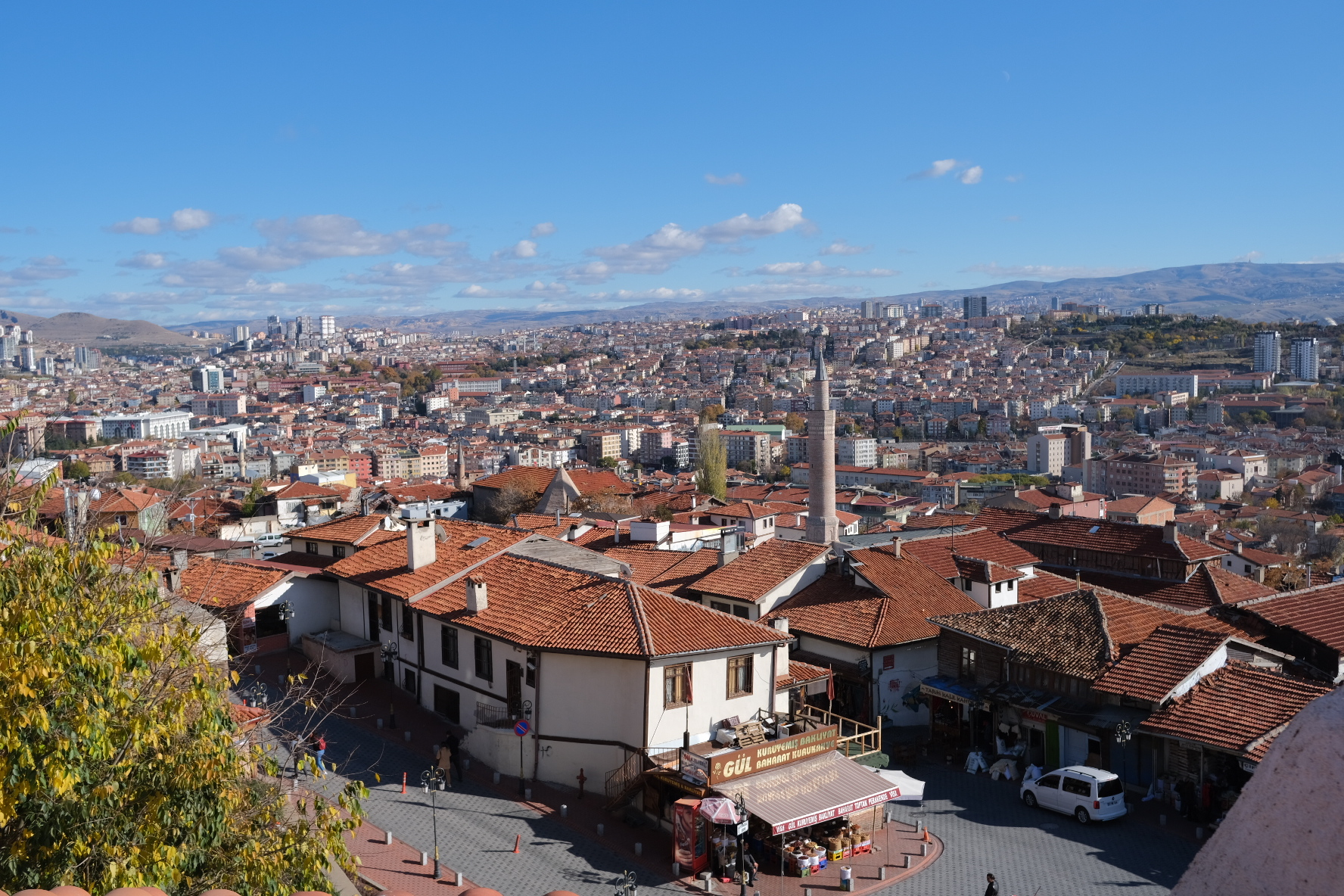

- Logo

- Map showing Altındağ District in Ankara Province

- Location within Turkey Location within Turkey Central Anatolia
- Coordinates: 39°57′49″N 32°54′12″E
- Country: Turkey
- Province: Ankara

Government
  - Mayor: Asım Balcı (AKP)
- Area: 123 km^{2} (47 sq mi)
- Elevation: 900 m (3,000 ft)
- Population (2022): 413,994
  - Density: 3,370/km^{2} (8,720/sq mi)
- Time zone: UTC+3 (TRT)
- Area code: 0312
- Website: Altındağ Municipality; Altındağ District Governorate

Altındağ is a municipality and a metropolitan district of Ankara Province, Turkey. Its area is 123 km^{2}, and its population is 413,994 (2022). It covers the northeastern part of the city of Ankara. Its elevation is 900 m (2,953 ft).

== Demographics ==
Historical population
Year	Pop.	±% p.a.
2007	370,735	—
2012	363,744	−0.38%
2017	371,366	+0.42%
2022	413,994	+2.20%
Source: TÜIK (2007-2022)

== Neighbourhoods ==
There are 26 neighbourhoods in Altındağ District:

- Atıfbey
- Aydıncık
- Aydınlıkevler
- Baraj
- Başpınar
- Battalgazi
- Beşikkaya
- Doğantepe
- Feridun Çelik
- Gicik
- Gültepe
- Güneşevler
- Hacettepe
- Hacı Bayram
- Kale
- Karacaören
- Karapürçek
- Kavaklı
- Önder
- Örnek
- Peçenek
- Solfasol
- Tatlar
- Ulubey
- Yıldıztepe
- Zübeyde Hanım

== Geography ==
Located just outside the city centre, (beyond the district of Ulus as far as the large Altınpark), this hillside has long been home to the workers in the city of Ankara but Altındağ remains one of the poorer quarters of the capital. The hillside is covered with illegally built gecekondu housing, home to low-income families. Among the housing there are some municipal buildings, public housing, state housing for civil servants and many car-repair workshops.

The ancient Ankara Castle is in Altındağ and there has recently been investment in restoration work. With this architectural heritage, Altındağ is a member of the Norwich-based European Association of Historic Towns and Regions.

== History ==
Altındağ includes parts of the historic city of Ankara, as well as the first National Assembly in which Republic of Turkey was founded is in Ulus.

Altındağ was the location of one of the first gecekondu developments in Turkey, when in the 1950s and 1960s people who are from rural Central Anatolia and migrated to Ankara city, they illegally built small, one-bedroom houses named gecekondu, on small plots of land; then in the 1970s and 1980s these plots of land were made legal through amnesty legislation, and eventually sold to developers who replaced these shacks with larger, multi-story apartment buildings.

== Prominent neighbourhoods ==
- Aydınlıkevler - a quiet residential neighbourhood of civil servants and other members of Ankara's middle class; centred on an avenue of schools, banks and shops; contains the SSK teaching hospital, a military officers housing compound, the headquarters of Türk Telekom, Ankara University's faculty of agriculture and Altınpark.
- Hacı Bayram - home to one of the oldest mosques in Ankara, the mosque and tomb of the 14th-century Ankara-born mystic Haci Bayram Veli, famous for prophesying the conquest of Constantinople, and then founding his own Sufi sect. The district has recently been renovated by urban planner Raci Bademli.

== Places of interest ==
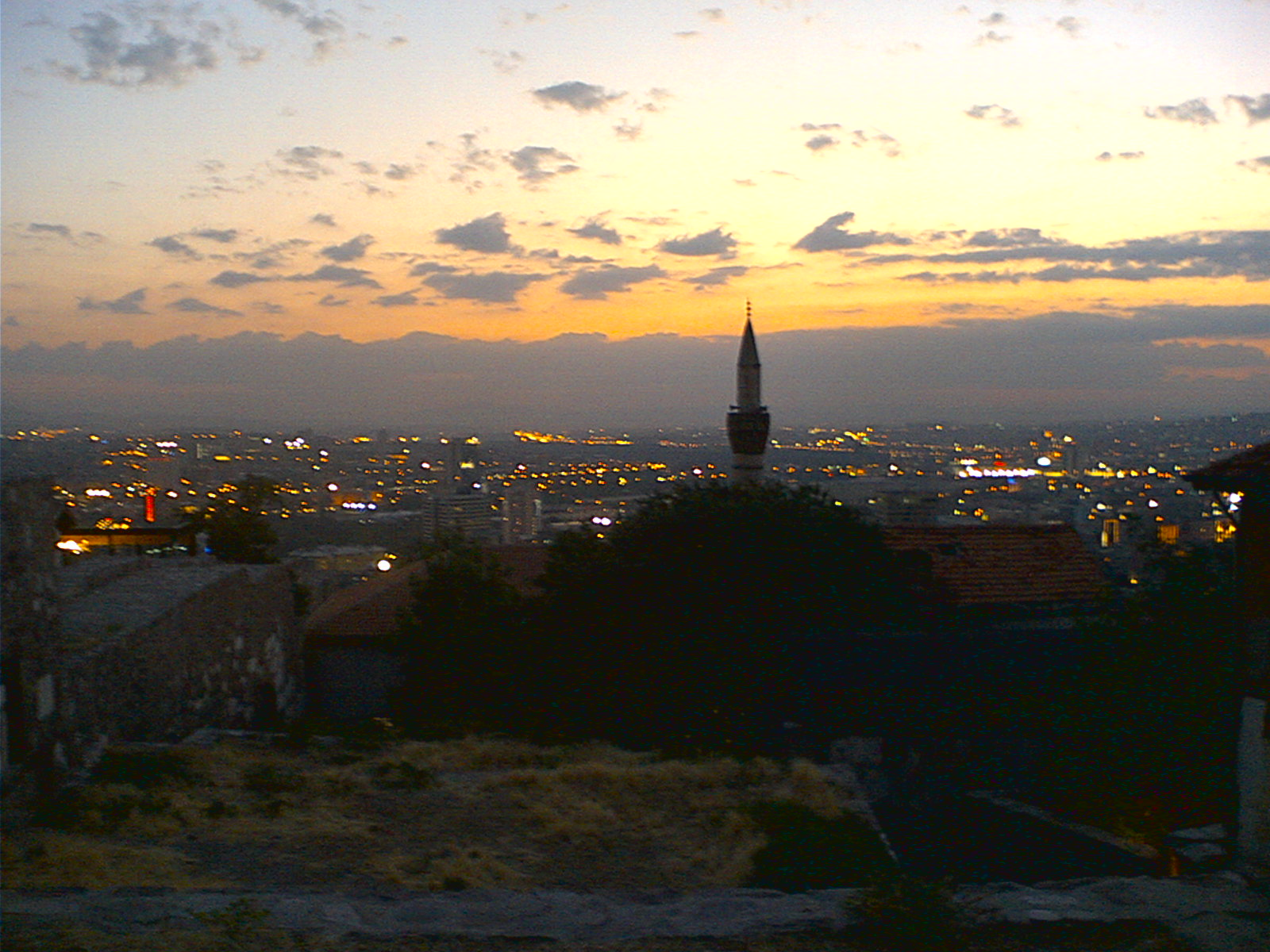
A panorama of Ankara from the castle.

- Altınpark - A large park, formerly a golf course which belonged to USA embassy, noted for its 10-metre-high (33 ft) statue of a loaf of bread at the entrance; contains a fairground, go-karting, ice-skating, large pools for boating and fishing, the Feza Gürsey Science Center, and much more.
- Ankara Castle (kale) - the hilltop heart of the old city of Ankara, built by the Galatians and the Byzantines, now surrounded with antique shops, coffee houses and bar/restaurants in restored Ottoman-period wooden houses, where traditional Turkish music (fasıl) is played late into the evening. One of Ankara's few historical sites.
- Karapürçek - location of Ankara's annual oil-wrestling tournament.
- Ulucanlar Prison Museum
