= Anastasia Loukaitou-Sideris =

Greek-American academic (born 1958)

Anastasia Loukaitou-Sideris (born May 12, 1958) is a Greek-American academic. She is the Dean of the UCLA Luskin School of Public Affairs and a Distinguished Professor of urban planning and urban design at UCLA. She is also a core faculty of the UCLA Urban Humanities Initiative. She served as Associate Provost for Academic Planning at UCLA from 2016-2019, and she has been the Associate Dean of the UCLA Luskin School of Public Affairs since 2010. She was the chair of the UCLA Department of Urban Planning from 2002-2008. She is a public space scholar and has examined transformations in the public realm and public space in cities, and their associated social meanings and impacts on urban residents. An underlying theme of her research is its user focus, as it seeks to comprehend the built environment from the perspective of different, often vulnerable, user groups.

== Biography ==
Loukaitou-Sideris studied Architecture at the National Technical University of Athens (1977-1983), and is a registered architect in Athens, Greece. She later obtained a Masters in Architecture (1984), a Masters in Urban Planning (1985), and a PhD in Urban Planning (1988), all from the University of Southern California (USC). At USC she was a student of architect Panos Koulermos, and during her student years worked at his architectural studio in Westwood. She was a doctoral student of Tridib Banerjee, and together they received a grant in 1990 from the National Endowment for the Arts to study the “Private Production of Downtown Public Space: Experiences of Los Angeles and San Francisco.” This study planted the seeds for Loukaitou-Sideris’s first book, Urban Design Downtown: Poetics and Politics of Form, co-authored with Tridib Banerjee, and published in 1998. A later book of hers, Sidewalks: Conflict and Negotiation over Public Space (2009), co-authored with her doctoral student, Renia Ehrenfeucht, is in a list of “25 must-read books about cities written by women.” Overall, Loukaitou-Sideris has published 12 books and over 120 academic articles and chapters.

She has also been involved in a number of professional projects and has created toolkits and guidelines for professional planners and designers. She has been instrumental in the creation of parklets in downtown Los Angeles and in the development of Golden Age Park, located in the Westlake neighborhood, which is the first park in Los Angeles geared towards older adults. For these works she has received a number of awards from the American Planning Association.

== Books ==
- Anastasia Loukaitou-Sideris, Alexandre Bayen, Giovanny Circella and R. Jayakrishnan (Eds.) Pandemic in the Metropolis: Transportation Impacts and Recovery. Springer Nature, Switzerland AG. (2022)
- Kian Goh, Anastasia Loukaitou-Sideris, and Vinit Mukhija (Eds.). Just Urban Design: The Struggle for a Public City. Cambridge, MA: MIT Press (2022)
- Jose Maria de Ureña, Chia-Lin Chen, Anastasia Loukaitou-Sideris and Roger Vickerman (Eds.) Spatial Implications and Planning Criteria for High-Speed Rail Cities and Regions. New York: Routledge (2021)
- Dana Cuff, Anastasia Loukaitou-Sideris, Todd Presner, Maite Zubiaurre, and Jonathan Crisman, Urban Humanities: New Practices for Reimagining the City. Cambridge, MA: MIT Press (2020).
- Vania Ceccato and Anastasia Loukaitou-Sideris (Eds.) Transit Crime and Sexual Violence in Cities: International Evidence and Prevention. New York: Routledge (2020).
- Tridib Banerjee and Anastasia Loukaitou-Sideris (Eds.) The New Companion to Urban Design. London and New York: Routledge (2019).
- Karen Chapple and Anastasia Loukaitou-Sideris. Transit-Oriented Displacement or Community Dividend? Understanding the Effects of Smarter Growth on Communities. Cambridge, MA: MIT Press (2019).
- Vinit Mukhija and Anastasia Loukaitou-Sideris (Eds.) The Informal American City: Beyond Taco Trucks and Day Labor. Cambridge, MA: MIT Press (2014).
- Tridib Banerjee and Anastasia Loukaitou-Sideris (Eds.) Companion to Urban Design. New York and London: Routledge (2011).
- Anastasia Loukaitou-Sideris and Renia Ehrenfeucht. Sidewalks: Conflict and Negotiation over Public Space, Cambridge, MA: MIT Press. (2009)
- Paul Ong and Anastasia Loukaitou-Sideris (Eds.) Jobs and Economic Development in Minority Communities. Temple University Press, Philadelphia: Temple University Press (2006)
- Anastasia Loukaitou-Sideris and Tridib Banerjee, Urban Design Downtown: Poetics and Politics of Form. Berkeley and Los Angeles: University of California Press (1998)
