= Feza Gürsey Science Center =

- Feza Gürsey Bilim Merkezi
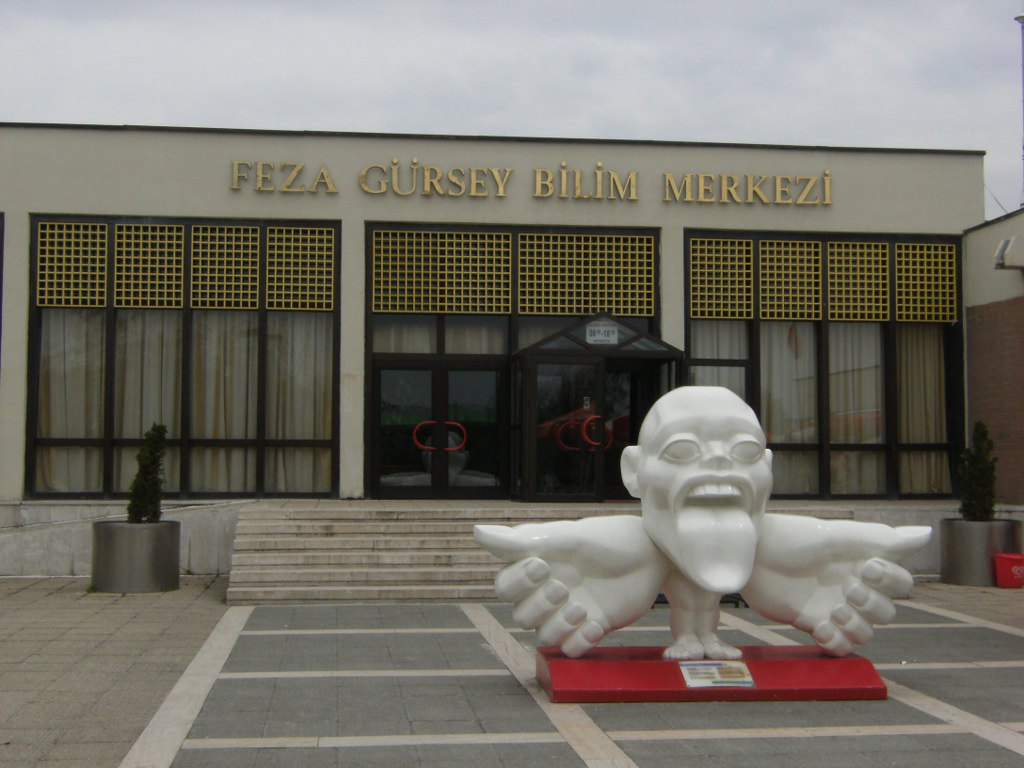
- Feza Gürsey Science Center in Ankara, Turkey (The sculpture represents the relative importance of body parts in human brain)

- Location of Feza Gürsey Science Center
- Established: 23 April 1993
- Location: Ankara, Turkey
- Coordinates: 39.96545°N 32.87272°E
- Type: Science museum
- Website: www.fezagurseybilimmerkezi.com

Feza Gürsey Science Center (Turkish: Feza Gürsey Bilim Merkezi, FGBM) is a science museum in Ankara, Turkey. It is named after Feza Gürsey (1921 - 1992), the renowned Turkish mathematician and physicist.

The center was founded by the Metropolitan municipality of Ankara. It was opened on 23 April 1993, the Children's Day of Turkey. It is situated in Altınpark, the main recreation center of Ankara and is operated by ANFA, a sub unit of the municipality.

The original exhibits were built by the Ontario Science Centre in Toronto Canada. In addition to the delivery and installation of the exhibits, the OSC sent a team of educators and hosts and spent a month in Ankara training their staff.

The center has 48 exhibits, most of which are either interactive or live demonstrations. The types of exhibits are determined by the faculty members of the Middle East Technical University (METU, Turkish: Orta Doğu Teknik Üniversitesi, ODTÜ) in line with the curriculum of the secondary schools in Turkey.
