= Jorja Leap =

American anthropologist

- Born: Jorja Manos; Los Angeles, CA
- Occupations: Professor, Social Worker, Author
- Notable work: Jumped In, Project Fatherhood

Jorja Leap is an American anthropologist and adjunct professor in the social welfare department at the University of California, Los Angeles (UCLA). She is also Director of the Health and Social Justice Partnership at UCLA and is a nationally recognized gang expert.

In 2011, Leap was named one of Los Angeles Magazine's Action Heroes for her policy work and gang intervention efforts in the Los Angeles area. Los Angeles Magazine named her as one of the "50 Most Influential Women in Los Angeles" in 2012, and in the same year she won the Joseph Nunn Alumna of the Year award at UCLA.

== Early life ==
Leap was born and raised in South Los Angeles, California.

== Education and career ==
Leap completed her undergraduate and graduate degrees from UCLA. In 1978, she received a B.A. in Sociology. In 1980, she earned a master's degree in social work, and in 1988 she received a Ph.D. in psychological anthropology. Her dissertation, under the name Jorja Jeane Manos Prover, was Culture-makers: Hollywood writers as an American elite.

She was a lecturer at California State University, Fullerton from 1980 to 1990, and at the University of Southern California from 1990 to 1992, before joining UCLA as a lecturer in 1992.

== Books ==
In 1994, under the name Jorja Prover, Leap published the book No One Knows Their Names: Screenwriters in Hollywood.

In March 2012, Leap published Jumped In: What Gangs Taught Me About Violence, Drugs, Love, and Redemption.

In 2015, she published Project Fatherhood: A Story of Courage and Healing in One of America's Toughest Communities.
