= Akpınar =

Akpınar (a Turkish toponym meaning "white spring" or "white fountain") may refer to:

== People ==
- Ismet Akpınar (born 1995), German basketball player
- Mehmet Akpınar (born 1940), Turkish fencer
- Metin Akpınar (born 1941), Turkish actor

== Places ==
- Akpınar, Adıyaman, a village in the central district of Adıyaman Province, Turkey
- Akpınar, Alaca
- Akpınar, Bartın, a village in the central district of Bartın Province, Turkey
- Akpınar, Bayat, a village in the district of Bayat, Afyonkarahisar Province, Turkey
- Akpınar, Başmakçı, a village in the district of Başmakçı, Afyonkarahisar Province, Turkey
- Akpınar, Bayramiç
- Akpınar, Besni, a village in the district of Besni, Adıyaman Province, Turkey
- Akpınar, Biga
- Akpınar, Borçka, a village in the district of Borçka, Artvin Province, Turkey
- Akpınar, Bozüyük, a village in the district of Bozüyük, Bilecik Province, Turkey
- Akpınar, Çameli
- Akpınar, Çermik
- Akpınar, Cumayeri
- Akpınar, Daday, a village in Turkey
- Akpınar, Erdemli, a village and summer resort in the district of Erdemli, Mersin Province, Turkey
- Akpınar, Gümüşhacıköy, a village in the district of Gümüşhacıköy, Amasya Province, Turkey
- Akpınar, Harmancık
- Akpınar, İskilip
- Akpınar, İspir
- Akpınar, Karayazı
- Akpınar, Kahta, a village in the district of Kahta, Adıyaman Province, Turkey
- Akpınar, Karakoçan
- Akpınar, Kumlu, a village in Kumlu district of Hatay province, Turkey
- Akpınar, Kırşehir, a town in Kırşehir Province, Turkey
- Akpınar, Mecitözü
- Akpınar, Merzifon, a village in the district of Merzifon, Amasya Province, Turkey
- Akpınar, Nazilli, a village in the District of Nazilli, Aydın Province, Turkey
- Akpınar, Odunpazarı, a village in Odunpazarı districy of Eskişehir Province, Turkey
- Akpınar, Ortaköy, a village in the district of Ortaköy, Aksaray Province, Turkey
- Akpınar, Savaştepe, a village
- Akpınar, Sungurlu
- Akpınar, Tufanbeyli, a village in the district of Tufanbeyli, Adana Province, Turkey
- Akpınar, Yüreğir, a village in the district of Yüreğir, Adana Province, Turkey

== See also ==
- Akpınarlı, Dinar, a village in the Dinar district of Afyonkarahisar Province, Turkey
