= Çamlı =

Çamlı (adjective form of the Turkish word çam for "pine" and therefore literally "piny" or "piney") may refer to the following places in Turkey:

- Çamlı, Dinar
- Çamlı, Erdemli
- Çamlı, Hopa
- Çamlı, Manyas
- Çamlı, Yığılca

== See also ==
- Çamlıbel (disambiguation)
- Çamlıca (disambiguation)
- Çamlıdere (disambiguation)
- Çamlıhemşin
- Çamlıyayla
