= Ericek =

Ericek can refer to the following villages in Turkey:

- Ericek, Bolu
- Ericek, Buharkent
- Ericek, Çameli
- Ericek, Dursunbey
- Ericek, Ilgaz
- Ericek, Nallıhan
- Ericek, Osmaneli
