= Halvdan =

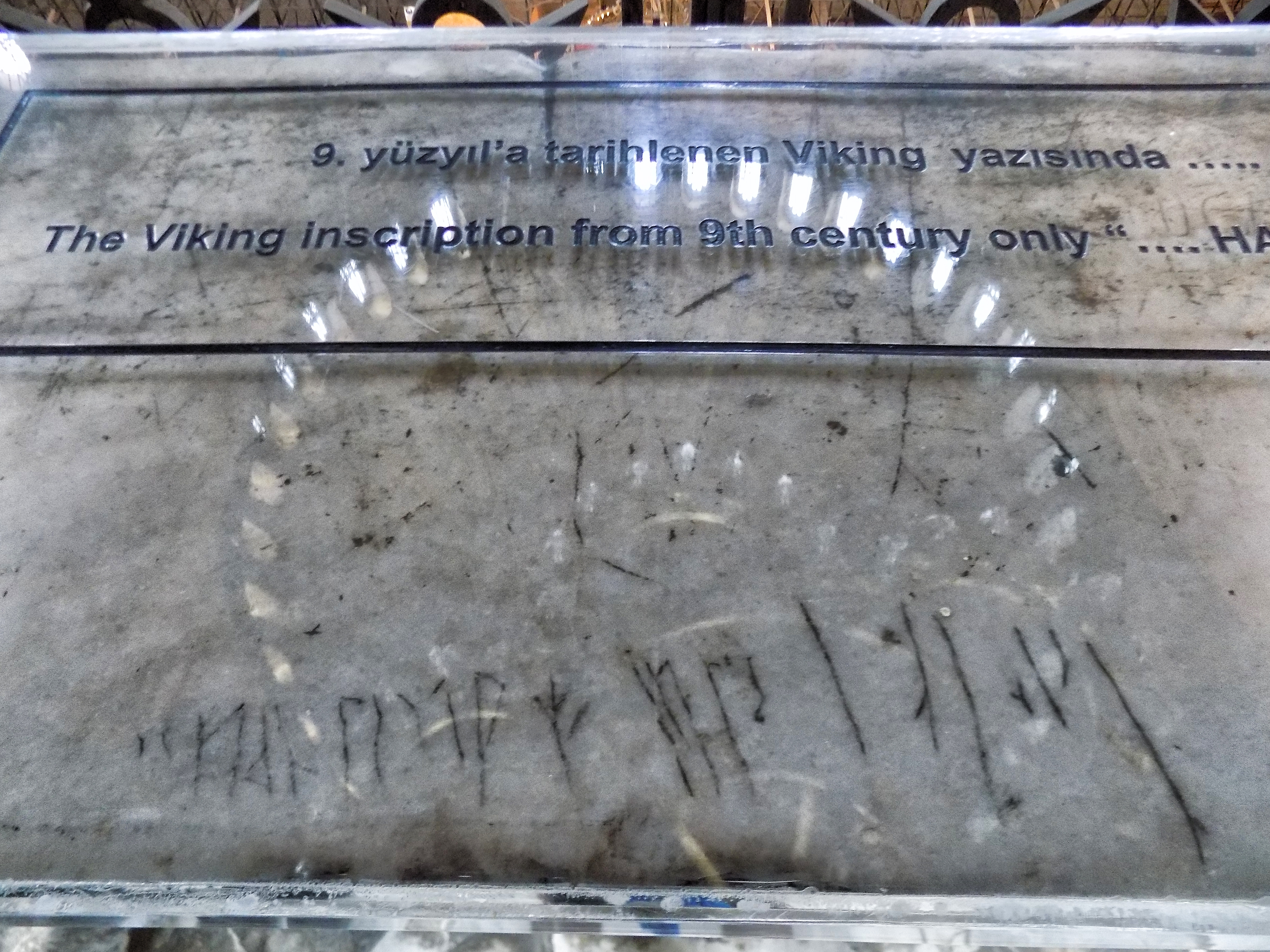
"Halvdan was here" inscription in Hagia Sophia's upper gallery. (9th century)

Halvdan is a masculine given name. Notable people with the name include:

- Halvdan Aarsrud (1878–1925), Norwegian bailiff and politician for the Labour Party
- Halvdan the Black (c. 810 – c. 860), ninth-century king of Vestfold
- Halvdan Wexelsen Freihow (1883–1965), Norwegian priest and culturist
- Halvdan (runemaster), runemaster in mid-11th century Södermanland, Sweden
- Lie, Trygve Halvdan (1896–1968), Norwegian politician, labour leader, government official and author
- Halvdan Holbø (1907–1995), Norwegian painter
- Halvdan Koht (1873–1965), Norwegian historian and politician representing the Labour Party
- Halvdan Ljøsne (1929–2006), Norwegian painter
- Halvdan Sivertsen (born 1950), Norwegian singer-songwriter and guitarist
- Halvdan Skard (born 1939), Norwegian politician for the Labour Party
- Halvdan Eyvind Stokke (1900–1977), Norwegian railway director and politician

== See also ==
- Aldan (disambiguation)
- Alvan (disambiguation)
- Avdan (disambiguation)
- Halda
- Haldan (disambiguation)
- Halva
- Halvan (disambiguation)
