= Çiğdemli =

Çiğdemli can refer to:

- Çiğdemli, Aziziye
- Çiğdemli, Bala
- Çiğdemli, Çameli
- Çiğdemli, Kemah
- Çiğdemli, Silvan
