= Sofular =

Sofular can refer to:

- Sofular, Çameli
- Sofular, İvrindi, Turkey
- Sofular, Tavas
- Sofular, Tovuz, Azerbaijan
- Sofular, Yenice, Turkey
