= Sarıyazı =

Sarıyazı can refer to:

- Sarıyazı, Kemah
- Sarıyazı, Osmaneli
