= Belevi (disambiguation) =

Belevi can refer to:

- Belevi
- Belevi, Çal
- Belevi, Çameli
