= Davutköy =

Davutköy can refer to:

- Davutköy, Daday
- Davutköy, Yenice
