= Gökçeyaka =

Gökçeyaka can refer to:

- Gökçeyaka, Çameli
- Gökçeyaka, Emirdağ
- Gökçeyaka, Finike
- Gökçeyaka, Yeşilova
