= Bekdemirler =

Bekdemirler can refer to:

- Bekdemirler, Harmancık
- Bekdemirler, Mudurnu
