= Karabayır =

Karabayır can refer to:

- Karabayır, Bozüyük
- Karabayır, Çameli
- Karabayır, Çorum
- Karabayır, Dargeçit
- Karabayır, Korkuteli
