= Yaylapınar =

Yaylapınar may refer to:

- Yaylapınar, Bayburt
- Yaylapınar, Çameli
- Yaylapınar, Feke
- Yaylapınar, İliç
- Yaylapınar, Refahiye
