= Ayvacık =

Ayvacık may refer to the following places in Turkey:

- Ayvacık, Çameli
- Ayvacık, Çanakkale
- Ayvacık, Dursunbey
- Ayvacık, Samsun

== See also ==
- Ayvalık
