= Yağca =

Yağca can refer to:

- Yağca, Döşemealtı
- Yağca, Kemah
