= Boyalıca =

Boyalıca can refer to the following places in Turkey:

- Boyalıca, İznik, a neighbourhood of İznik, Bursa Province
- Boyalıca, Daday, a village
- Boyalıca, Dursunbey, a village
