= Eirakla =

Town of ancient Bithynia, in Roman times

Coordinates: 40°20′15″N 30°10′50″E

Eirakla was a town of ancient Bithynia, inhabited in Roman times. The name does not occur among ancient authors but is inferred from epigraphic and other evidence.

Its site is located near Soğucakpinar, Asiatic Turkey.
