= Çürüklü =

Çürüklü may refer to the following places in Turkey:

- Çürüklü, Dinar
- Çürüklü, Kozan
