= Yahşiler =

Yahşiler can refer to:

- Yahşiler, Kemah
- Yahşiler, Tavas
- Yahşiler, Yumurtalık
- Yahşiler, Erzincan
