= Çamlıyayla (disambiguation) =

Çamlıyayla can refer to:

- Çamlıyayla
- Çamlıyayla, Kemah
- Çamlıyayla, Narman
