= Özdamar =

Özdamar is a toponym and a Turkish surname. It may refer to:

- Özdamar, Kemah, village in the Kemah District of Erzincan Province in Turkey

== People with the surname ==
- Emine Sevgi Özdamar (born 1946), writer, director, and actress of Turkish origin who resides in Germany
- Semra Özdamar (born 1956), Turkish actress
- Süleyman Özdamar (born 1993), Turkish footballer
