= Alacaatlı =

Alacaatlı can refer to the following villages in Turkey:

- Alacaatlı, Dinar
- Alacaatlı, Sındırgı
