= Çamlıbel =

Çamlıbel may refer to:

- Çamlıbel, Çameli
- Çamlıbel, Daday, a village
- Çamlıbel, Gölyaka
- Çamlıbel, Pozantı, a village in Pozantı district of Adana Province, Turkey
- Çamlıbel, Finike, a village in Finike district of Antalya Province, Turkey
- Çamlıbel, Oltu
- Çamlıbel, Silifke, a village in Silifke district of Mersin Province, Turkey
- Myrtou or Çamlıbel, a town in Cyprus
