= Kızılyaka =

Kizilyaka can refer to:

- Kızılyaka, Altınyayla
- Kızılyaka, Çameli
