= Yeşilyayla =

Yeşilyayla can refer to:

- Yeşilyayla, Çameli
- Yeşilyayla, Çaycuma
- Yeşilyayla, Çelikhan
- Yeşilyayla, Çorum
- Yeşilyayla, Gümüşova
- Yeşilyayla, Kemaliye
- Yeşilyayla, Korkuteli
- Yeşilyayla, Tercan
- Yeşilyayla, Yapraklı
