= Arıkaya =

Arıkaya can refer to:

- Arıkaya, Çameli
- Arıkaya, Kozluk
