= Gökkaya =

Gökkaya may refer to:

- Gökkaya, Kemah, a village in the Kemah District of Erzincan Province, Turkey
- Gökkaya, Ortaköy, a village in the District of Ortaköy, Aksaray Province, Turkey
