= Yastıktepe =

Yastıktepe can refer to:

- Yastıktepe, Kemah
- Yastıktepe, Pasinler
