= Yakaköy =

Yakaköy may refer to the following settlements in Turkey:

- Yakaköy, Bozdoğan, a neighbourhood in Aydın Province
- Yakaköy, Dinar, a village in Afyonkarahisar Province
- Yakaköy, Hasankeyf, a village in Batman Province
- Yakaköy, Korkuteli, a neighbourhood in Korkuteli, Antalya Province
- Yakaköy, Yapraklı, a village in Çankırı Province
