= Gürsu (disambiguation) =

Gürsu is a town and district of Bursa Province of Turkey.

Gürsu may also refer to:

- Gürsu, Çameli
- Gürsu, Kaş, village in Antalya Province, Turkey
- Gürsu, Sandıklı, village in Afyonkarahisar Province, Turkey
- Gürsu, Taşova, village in Amasya Province, Turkey
- Müjdat Gürsu, Turkish footballer
