= Sarıkavak =

Sarıkavak (literally "yellow poplar") is a Turkish place name and may refer to:

- Sarıkavak, Çameli
- Sarıkavak, Çamlıdere, a village in Çamlıdere district of Ankara Province, Turkey
- Sarıkavak, Çamlıyayla, a village in Çamlıyayla district of Mersin Province, Turkey
- Sarıkavak, Dazkırı, a village in Dazkırı district of Afyonkarahisar Province, Turkey
- Sarıkavak, İskilip
- Sarıkavak, Taşköprü, a village in Turkey
- The former name of Kumluca district of Antalya Province, Turkey
- Another name for Kürkçü, Mut, a village in Mut district of Mersin Province, Turkey
