= Yapağılı =

Yapağılı can refer to:

- Yapağılı, Dinar
- Yapağılı, Köprüköy
