= Aktoprak =

Aktoprak (literally "white soil" in Turkish) may refer to the following places in Turkey:

- Aktoprak, Dinar, a village in the district of Dinar, Afyonkarahisar Province
- Aktoprak, Gölbaşı, a village in the district of Gölbaşı, Adıyaman Province
- an alternative name of Kılan, Ulukışla, a village in Ulukışla ilçe (district) of Niğde Province
