= Doğanbeyli =

Doğanbeyli can refer to:

- Doğanbeyli, Kemah
- Doğanbeyli, Tufanbeyli
