= Dutlu =

Dutlu can refer to:

- Dutlu, Kemah
- Dutlu, Oltu
- Dutlu, Şavşat
