= Akgün =

Akgün may refer to:

== Given name ==
- Akgün Kaçmaz (1935–2023), Turkish footballer

== Surnames ==
- Feride Akgün (born 1973), Turkish women's footballer
- Lale Akgün (born 1953), German politician
- Mehmet Akgün (born 1986), Turkish-German footballer
- Mensur Akgün, Turkish scholar
- Nurceren Akgün (born 1992), Turkish female handball player
- Ömer Akgün (born 1982), Turkish sport shooter
- Umutcan Akgün (born 2001), Turkish-Dutch entrepreneur
- Yunus Akgün (born 2000), Turkish footballer

== Places ==
- Akgün, Dinar, a village in the district of Dinar, Afyonkarahisar Province, Turkey
