= Demirce, Daday =

Demirce
- Village
- Location in Turkey
- Coordinates: 41.475°N 33.299°E
- Country: Turkey
- Province: Kastamonu
- District: Daday
- Population (2022): 108
- Time zone: UTC+3 (TRT)

Demirce is a village in the Daday District of Kastamonu Province, Turkey. Its population is 108 (2022). It is 53 km from Kastamonu city center and 28 km from Daday.

== Population ==
Historical population
| Year | Pop. | ±% p.a. |
|---|---|---|
| 1997 | 219 | — |
| 2007 | 152 | −3.59% |
| 2012 | 144 | −1.08% |
| 2017 | 90 | −8.97% |
| 2022 | 108 | +3.71% |
Source: 1997 census and TÜIK (2007-2022)
