= Koçkar =

Koçkar can refer to:

- Koçkar, Kemah
- Koçkar, Kulp
