= Avdan =

Avdan is a Turkish place name that may refer to the following places in Turkey:

- Avdan, Bozkurt
- Avdan, Bolu, a village in the district of Bolu, Bolu Province
- Avdan, Çamlıdere, a village in the district of Çamlıdere, Ankara Province
- Avdan, Dinar, a village in the district of Dinar, Afyonkarahisar Province
- Avdan, Emirdağ, a village in the district of Emirdağ, Afyonkarahisar Province
- Avdan, Keles
- Avdan, Korkuteli, a village in the district of Korkuteli, Antalya Province
- Avdan, Osmaneli, a village in the district of Osmaneli, Bilecik Province
- Avdan, Tavas
- Avdan, Vezirköprü, a village in the district of Vezirköprü, Samsun Province
