= Kemeryaka, Kemah =

Village in Turkey

Kemeryaka
- Village
- Location in Turkey
- Coordinates: 39°33′1″N 39°4′7″E
- Country: Turkey
- Province: Erzincan
- District: Kemah
- Population (2022): 114
- Time zone: UTC+3 (TRT)

Kemeryaka is a village in the Kemah District of Erzincan Province in Turkey. Its population was 114 in (2022).
