= Bilgiç, Dinar =

Bilgiç
- Village
- Location within Turkey Location within Turkey Aegean
- Coordinates: 37°59′N 30°07′E
- Country: Turkey
- Province: Afyonkarahisar
- District: Dinar
- Population (2021): 44
- Time zone: UTC+3 (TRT)

Bilgiç is a village in the Dinar District, Afyonkarahisar Province, Turkey. Its population is 44 (2021).
