= Karataş, Dinar =

Karataş
- Village
- Location within Turkey Location within Turkey Aegean
- Coordinates: 38.2106°N 30.2725°E
- Country: Turkey
- Province: Afyonkarahisar
- District: Dinar
- Population (2021): 113
- Time zone: UTC+3 (TRT)

Karataş is a village in the Dinar District, Afyonkarahisar Province, Turkey. Its population is 113 (2021).
