= Kırıkdere, Kemah =

Village in Turkey

Kırıkdere
- Village
- Location in Turkey
- Coordinates: 39.499°N 38.742°E
- Country: Turkey
- Province: Erzincan
- District: Kemah
- Population (2022): 26
- Time zone: UTC+3 (TRT)

Kırıkdere is a village in the Kemah District of Erzincan Province in Turkey. Its population is 26 (2022).
