= Koruyolu, Kemah =

Village in Turkey

Koruyolu
- Village
- Location in Turkey
- Coordinates: 39°39′N 39°10′E
- Country: Turkey
- Province: Erzincan
- District: Kemah
- Population (2022): 20
- Time zone: UTC+3 (TRT)

Koruyolu is a village in the Kemah District of Erzincan Province in Turkey. Its population is 20 (2022).
