= Doğanköy, Kemah =

Village in Turkey

Doğanköy
- Village
- Location in Turkey
- Coordinates: 39.655°N 39.145°E
- Country: Turkey
- Province: Erzincan
- District: Kemah
- Population (2022): 51
- Time zone: UTC+3 (TRT)

Doğanköy (Kurdish: Tortan) is a village in the Kemah District of Erzincan Province in Turkey. The village is populated by Kurds of the Aslanan tribe and had a population of 51 in 2022.
