= Karacaköy, Kemah =

Village in Turkey

Karacaköy
- Village
- Location in Turkey
- Coordinates: 39.682°N 38.702°E
- Country: Turkey
- Province: Erzincan
- District: Kemah
- Population (2022): 63
- Time zone: UTC+3 (TRT)

Karacaköy (Kurdish: Camolar) is a village in the Kemah District of Erzincan Province in Turkey. The village is populated by Kurds of the Şadiyan tribe and had a population of 63 in 2022.

The hamlets of Ateşler, Karamustafalar, Subaşı, Ünlü and Yıldırım are attached to the village.
