= Kocaova, Çameli =

Village in Turkey

Kocaova
- Neighbourhood
- Location in Turkey Kocaova (Turkey Aegean)
- Coordinates: 37°06′N 29°15′E
- Country: Turkey
- Province: Denizli
- District: Çameli
- Population (2022): 183
- Time zone: UTC+3 (TRT)

Kocaova is a neighbourhood in the municipality and district of Çameli, Denizli Province in Turkey. Its population is 183 (2022).
