= Akyünlü, Kemah =

Village in Turkey

Akyünlü
- Village
- Location in Turkey
- Coordinates: 39.6552°N 39.3965°E
- Country: Turkey
- Province: Erzincan
- District: Kemah
- Population (2022): 38
- Time zone: UTC+3 (TRT)

Akyünlü (Kurdish: Tixinkar) is a village in the Kemah District of Erzincan Province in Turkey. The village is populated by Kurds and had a population of 38 in 2022.
