= Çapalı =

- Village
- Location within Turkey Location within Turkey Aegean
- Coordinates: 38.0567°N 30.3086°E
- Country: Turkey
- Province: Afyonkarahisar
- District: Dinar
- Population (2021): 242
- Time zone: UTC+3 (TRT)

Çapalı is a village in the Dinar District, Afyonkarahisar Province, Turkey. Its population is 242 (2021).
