= Dinar District =

- District
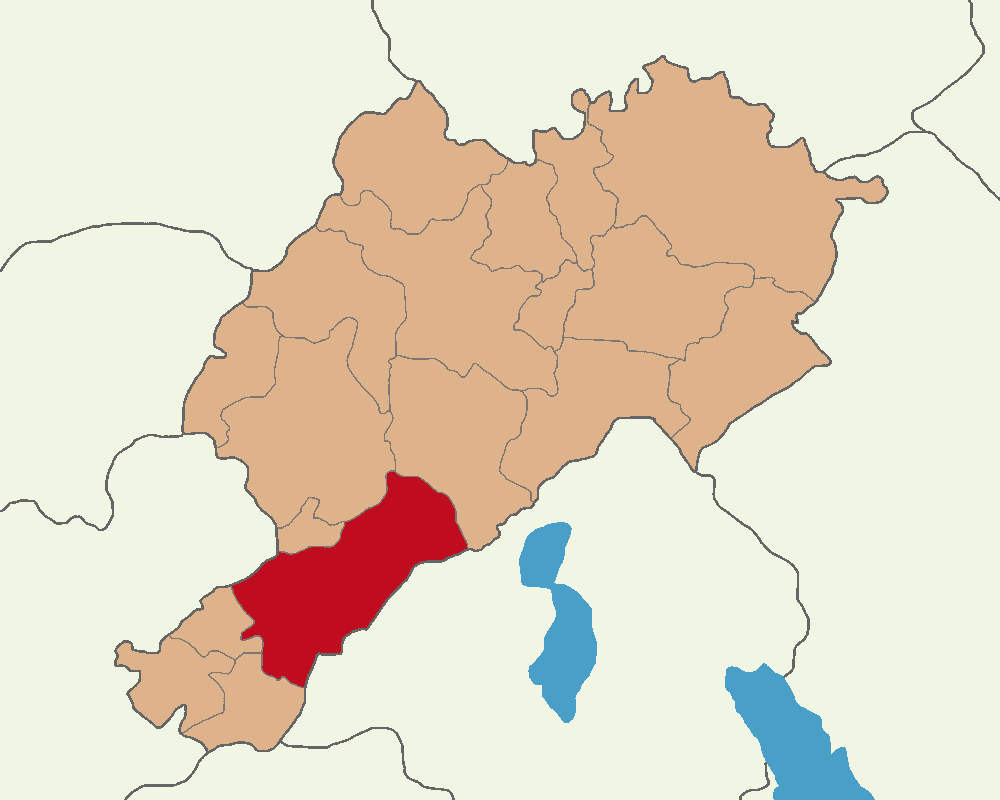
- Map showing Dinar District in Afyonkarahisar Province

- Location in Turkey Dinar District (Turkey Aegean)
- Coordinates: 38°04′N 30°10′E
- Country: Turkey
- Province: Afyonkarahisar
- Seat: Dinar

Government
  - Kaymakam: Ahmet Yurtseven
- Area: 1,254 km^{2} (484 sq mi)
- Population (2021): 47,378
  - Density: 37.78/km^{2} (97.85/sq mi)
- Time zone: UTC+3 (TRT)

Dinar District is a district of Afyonkarahisar Province of Turkey. Its seat is the town Dinar. Its area is 1,254 km^{2}, and its population is 47,378 (2021).

== Composition ==
There are three municipalities in Dinar District:

- Dinar
- Haydarlı
- Tatarlı

There are 60 villages in Dinar District:

- Afşar
- Akça
- Akçin
- Akgün
- Akpınarlı
- Aktoprak
- Alacaatlı
- Alparslan
- Avdan
- Bademli
- Bağcılar
- Belenpınar
- Bilgiç
- Bülüçalan
- Burunkaya
- Çağlayan
- Çakıcı
- Çamlı
- Çapalı
- Çayüstü
- Cerityaylası
- Çiçektepe
- Çobansaray
- Cumhuriyet
- Çürüklü
- Dikici
- Doğanlı
- Dombay
- Dumanköy
- Eldere
- Ergenli
- Gençali
- Göçerli
- Gökçeli
- Kabaklı
- Kadılar
- Karabedir
- Karahacılı
- Karakuyu
- Karataş
- Kazanpınar
- Keklicek
- Kınık
- Kızıllı
- Körpeli
- Okçular
- Palaz
- Pınarlı
- Sütlaç
- Tekin
- Tuğaylı
- Uluköy
- Yakaköy
- Yapağılı
- Yelalan
- Yeşilçat
- Yeşilhüyük
- Yeşilyurt
- Yıprak
- Yüksel
