= Kalınkoz, Çameli =

Village in Turkey

Kalınkoz
- Neighbourhood
- Location in Turkey Kalınkoz (Turkey Aegean)
- Coordinates: 37°08′N 29°19′E
- Country: Turkey
- Province: Denizli
- District: Çameli
- Population (2022): 1,338
- Time zone: UTC+3 (TRT)

Kalınkoz is a neighbourhood in the municipality and district of Çameli, Denizli Province in Turkey. Its population is 1,338 (2022).
