= Kazanpınar, Dinar =

Kazanpınar
- Village
- Location within Turkey Location within Turkey Aegean
- Coordinates: 38.1982°N 30.2030°E
- Country: Turkey
- Province: Afyonkarahisar
- District: Dinar
- Population (2021): 89
- Time zone: UTC+3 (TRT)

Kazanpınar is a village in the Dinar District, Afyonkarahisar Province, Turkey. Its population is 89 (2021).
