= Çakırlar, Kemah =

Village in Turkey

Çakırlar
- Village
- Location in Turkey
- Coordinates: 39.6191°N 39.3902°E
- Country: Turkey
- Province: Erzincan
- District: Kemah
- Population (2022): 34
- Time zone: UTC+3 (TRT)

Çakırlar (Kurdish: Sizmit) is a village in the Kemah District of Erzincan Province in Turkey. The village is populated by Kurds of the Çarekan tribe and had a population of 34 in 2022.
