= Eskibağlar, Kemah =

Village in Turkey

Eskibağlar
- Village
- Location in Turkey
- Coordinates: 39.561°N 39.022°E
- Country: Turkey
- Province: Erzincan
- District: Kemah
- Population (2022): 56
- Time zone: UTC+3 (TRT)

Eskibağlar is a village in the Kemah District of Erzincan Province in Turkey. Its population was 56 as of 2022.
