= Alpköy, Kemah =

Village in Turkey

Alpköy
- Village
- Location in Turkey
- Coordinates: 39°37′N 39°11′E
- Country: Turkey
- Province: Erzincan
- District: Kemah
- Population (2022): 69
- Time zone: UTC+3 (TRT)

Alpköy is a village in the Kemah District of Erzincan Province in Turkey. Its population is 69 (2022).
