= Yardere, Kemah =

Village in Turkey

Yardere
- Village
- Location in Turkey
- Coordinates: 39.771°N 39.037°E
- Country: Turkey
- Province: Erzincan
- District: Kemah
- Population (2022): 24
- Time zone: UTC+3 (TRT)

Yardere (Kurdish: Hoperek) is a village in the Kemah District of Erzincan Province in Turkey. The village is populated by Kurds of the Şadiyan tribe and had a population of 24 in 2022.
