= Alutça, Harmancık =

Village in Turkey

Alutça
- Neighbourhood
- Location in Turkey Alutça (Marmara)
- Coordinates: 39°38′N 28°58′E
- Country: Turkey
- Province: Bursa
- District: Harmancık
- Population (2022): 31
- Time zone: UTC+3 (TRT)

Alutça is a neighbourhood in the municipality and district of Harmancık, Bursa Province in Turkey. Its population is 31 (2022).
