= Dikyamaç, Kemah =

Village in Turkey

Dikyamaç
- Village
- Location in Turkey
- Coordinates: 39°37′23″N 38°46′45″E
- Country: Turkey
- Province: Erzincan
- District: Kemah
- Population (2022): 62
- Time zone: UTC+3 (TRT)

Dikyamaç is a village in the Kemah District of Erzincan Province in Turkey. Its population is 62 (2022).
