= Karacaören, Daday =

Village in Turkey

Karacaören
- Village
- Location in Turkey
- Coordinates: 41.478°N 33.212°E
- Country: Turkey
- Province: Kastamonu
- District: Daday
- Population (2021): 97
- Time zone: UTC+3 (TRT)

Karacaören is a village in the Daday District of Kastamonu Province in Turkey. Its population was 97 in 2021.
