= Küten, Daday =

Village in Turkey

Küten
- Village
- Location in Turkey
- Coordinates: 41°27′47″N 33°30′34″E
- Country: Turkey
- Province: Kastamonu
- District: Daday
- Population (2021): 54
- Time zone: UTC+3 (TRT)

Küten is a village in the Daday District of Kastamonu Province in Turkey. Its population was 54 in 2021.
