= Cumhuriyet, Dinar =

Cumhuriyet
- Village
- Location within Turkey Location within Turkey Aegean
- Coordinates: 38.2009°N 30.2545°E
- Country: Turkey
- Province: Afyonkarahisar
- District: Dinar
- Population (2021): 159
- Time zone: UTC+3 (TRT)

Cumhuriyet is a village in the Dinar District, Afyonkarahisar Province, Turkey. Its population is 159 (2021).
