= Akdağ =

Highest point
- Elevation: 3,213 m (10,541 ft)

Geography
- Country: Turkey
- Parent range: Taurus Mountains

Akdağ (Turkish: Akdağ, "white mountain") is a mountain at the western end of the Taurus Mountains in the Aegean Region of Turkey. Its highest peak is 3,213 metres (10,541 ft). It lies in the Çameli district and the Çivril district of Denizli Province, The area was declared a national park in 2000.
