= Balçıkhisar, Osmaneli =

Balçıkhisar
- Village
- Location within Turkey Location within Marmara
- Coordinates: 40.3185°N 29.9688°E
- Country: Turkey
- Province: Bilecik
- District: Osmaneli
- Population (2021): 88
- Time zone: UTC+3 (TRT)

Balçıkhisar is a village in the Osmaneli District, Bilecik Province, Turkey. Its population is 88 (2021).
