= Düzmeşe, Osmaneli =

Düzmeşe
- Village
- Location within Turkey Location within Marmara
- Coordinates: 40.3817°N 29.9250°E
- Country: Turkey
- Province: Bilecik
- District: Osmaneli
- Population (2021): 242
- Time zone: UTC+3 (TRT)

Düzmeşe is a village in the Osmaneli District, Bilecik Province, Turkey. Its population is 242 (2021).
