= Keklicek, Dinar =

Keklicek
- Village
- Location within Turkey Location within Turkey Aegean
- Coordinates: 38.1642°N 30.1531°E
- Country: Turkey
- Province: Afyonkarahisar
- District: Dinar
- Population (2021): 67
- Time zone: UTC+3 (TRT)

Keklicek is a village in the Dinar District, Afyonkarahisar Province, Turkey. Its population is 67 (2021).
