= Adliye, Osmaneli =

Adliye
- Village
- Location within Turkey Location within Marmara
- Coordinates: 40.4939°N 29.9414°E
- Country: Turkey
- Province: Bilecik
- District: Osmaneli
- Population (2021): 56
- Time zone: UTC+3 (TRT)

Adliye is a village in the Osmaneli District, Bilecik Province, Turkey. Its population is 56 (2021).
