= Kömürköy, Kemah =

Village in Turkey

Kömürköy
- Village
- Location in Turkey
- Coordinates: 39°39′22″N 39°3′8″E
- Country: Turkey
- Province: Erzincan
- District: Kemah
- Population (2022): 70
- Time zone: UTC+3 (TRT)

Kömürköy is a village in the Kemah District of Erzincan Province in Turkey. Its population is 70 (2022).
