= Akça, Kemah =

Village in Turkey

Akça
- Village
- Location in Turkey
- Coordinates: 39.5918°N 38.9339°E
- Country: Turkey
- Province: Erzincan
- District: Kemah
- Population (2022): 22
- Time zone: UTC+3 (TRT)

Akça is a village in the Kemah District of Erzincan Province in Turkey. Its population is 22 (2022).
