= Gülbahçe, Kemah =

Village in Turkey

Gülbahçe
- Village
- Location in Turkey
- Coordinates: 39.659°N 38.687°E
- Country: Turkey
- Province: Erzincan
- District: Kemah
- Population (2022): 61
- Time zone: UTC+3 (TRT)

Gülbahçe is a village in the Kemah District of Erzincan Province in Turkey. Its population is 61 (2022).
