= Bayırköy, Daday =

Village in Turkey

Bayırköy
- Village
- Location in Turkey
- Coordinates: 41.463°N 33.490°E
- Country: Turkey
- Province: Kastamonu
- District: Daday
- Population (2021): 70
- Time zone: UTC+3 (TRT)

Bayırköy is a village in the Daday District of Kastamonu Province in Turkey. Its population was 70 in 2021.
