= Osmaneli =

- Municipality
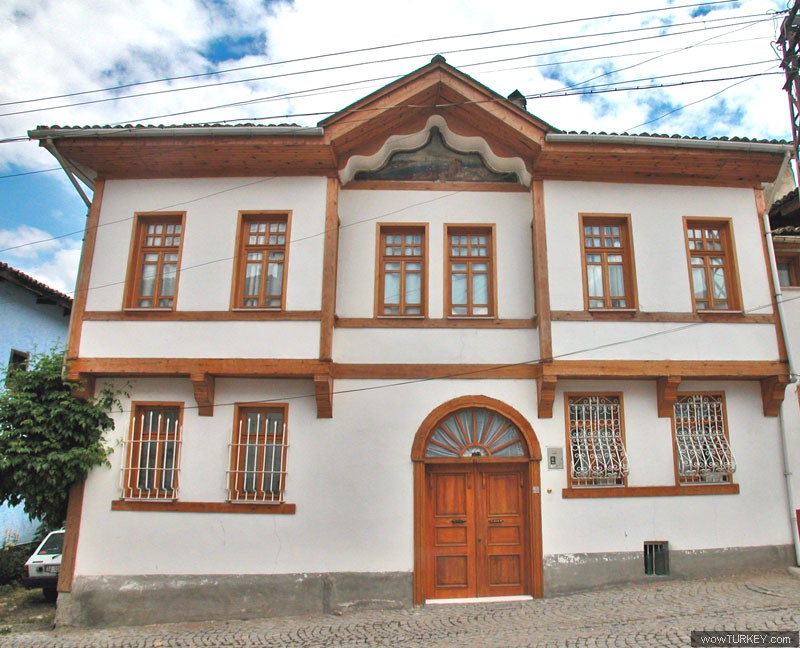
- Authentic Osmaneli House

- Location within Turkey Location within Marmara
- Coordinates: 40°21′N 30°1′E
- Country: Turkey
- Province: Bilecik
- District: Osmaneli

Government
  - Mayor: Bekir Torun (İYİ)
- Population (2021): 16,192
- Time zone: UTC+3 (TRT)
- Postal code: 11500
- Area code: 0228
- Website: www.osmaneli.bel.tr

Osmaneli is a town in Bilecik Province in the Marmara region of Turkey. It is the seat of Osmaneli District and has a population of 16,192 (2021). Its neighbours are Pamukova from north, Geyve from north-east, Gölpazarı from south-east, Bilecik from south, Yenişehir from south-west and İznik from west.

Situated on a hillside at a point where the Karasu, flowing down from Kandilli Dağ, enters the Sakarya River, this small town was known in antiquity as Leukai (in greek Λεύκαι and Λεύκη, Lèukae or Lèuke or Lèfke, "poplar") and more recently as Lefke. South of the town is a narrow river gorge with rocky walls up to 100 m/328 ft high, contributing to the town's scenery.

== History ==
Leukai was a town located on the road from Nicaea to Dorylaion and thus part of both the Byzantine Military Road and the Pilgrim's Road, the land route taken typically by Christian pilgrims to the Holy Land. The town was then conquered from the Byzantine Empire by the Ottomans in 1313. Turks and Rums (Anatolian Greeks) lived here together until the War of Independence after which also the name of the town was changed from Lefke to Osmaneli.

== Places to see ==
In the west part of Osmaneli is the well-preserved ruins of a large Rum Orthodox church of the 1890s not far from it, a building that was used as a silk-spinning mill, and also the owner's house. There are several Ottoman-style homes available and watermelon festivals each year being celebrated, which is also worth seeing.

The only structure in Osmaneli left from such Rums, was a church, named Hagios Georgios (i.e. Saint George, turk. Aya Yorgi), located on Cumhuriyet Avenue. It is understood from the archived documents that this 19th-century structure had passed through several different construction cycles. It is written in detail in those documents that the first structure had a basilica type crushed wooden roof, and following the privileges granted to Greek people as a result of Royal Edict of Reform, the current plan was implemented. This plan, in the shape of a Greek cross, currently does not have the top cover. The most remarkable point of the structure is the towers on both sides of the entrance, on the western side. These towers, covered with small domes, are used not only for climbing to the second floor but also as bell tower. Such type of twin towers at western sides of the buildings is common until the first years following Christ. These towers, which can also be seen in early Byzantium era churches, have also been integral parts of Romanic, Gothic, and Baroque cathedrals in European architecture since the days of the Carolingian Empire. It is also possible to see in Greek churches of the 19th century located in Istanbul and Anatolia during the Ottoman Empire that such towers were being used for the same functions and in the same shapes as they were being used in Europe. The most beautiful representative of this trend is this Greek Church in Osmaneli.
