= Belenpınar, Dinar =

Belenpınar
- Village
- Location within Turkey Location within Turkey Aegean
- Coordinates: 38.1153°N 30.0497°E
- Country: Turkey
- Province: Afyonkarahisar
- District: Dinar
- Population (2021): 96
- Time zone: UTC+3 (TRT)

Belenpınar is a village in the Dinar District, Afyonkarahisar Province, Turkey. Its population is 96 (2021).
