= Parmakkaya, Kemah =

Village in Turkey

Parmakkaya
- Village
- Location in Turkey
- Coordinates: 39°39′N 39°07′E
- Country: Turkey
- Province: Erzincan
- District: Kemah
- Population (2022): 12
- Time zone: UTC+3 (TRT)

Parmakkaya is a village in the Kemah District of Erzincan Province in Turkey. Its population is 12 (2022).
