= Medetli, Osmaneli =

Medetli
- Village
- Location within Turkey Location within Marmara
- Coordinates: 40°17′N 30°07′E
- Country: Turkey
- Province: Bilecik
- District: Osmaneli
- Population (2021): 291
- Time zone: UTC+3 (TRT)

Medetli is a village in the Osmaneli District, Bilecik Province, Turkey. Its population is 291 (2021).
