= Aktaş, Kemah =

Village in Turkey

Aktaş
- Village
- Location in Turkey
- Coordinates: 39.7922°N 39.0918°E
- Country: Turkey
- Province: Erzincan
- District: Kemah
- Population (2022): 19
- Time zone: UTC+3 (TRT)

Aktaş (Kurdish: Axtaş) is a village in the Kemah District of Erzincan Province in Turkey. The village is populated by Kurds of the Şadiyan tribe and had a population of 19 in 2022.

The hamlet of Samanlı is attached to the village.
