= Sorkuncuk, Daday =

Village in Turkey

Sorkuncuk
- Village
- Location in Turkey
- Coordinates: 41.355°N 33.463°E
- Country: Turkey
- Province: Kastamonu
- District: Daday
- Population (2021): 69
- Time zone: UTC+3 (TRT)

Sorkuncuk is a village in the Daday District of Kastamonu Province in Turkey. Its population was 69 in 2021.
