= Kemah District =

District of Erzincan Province, Turkey

- District
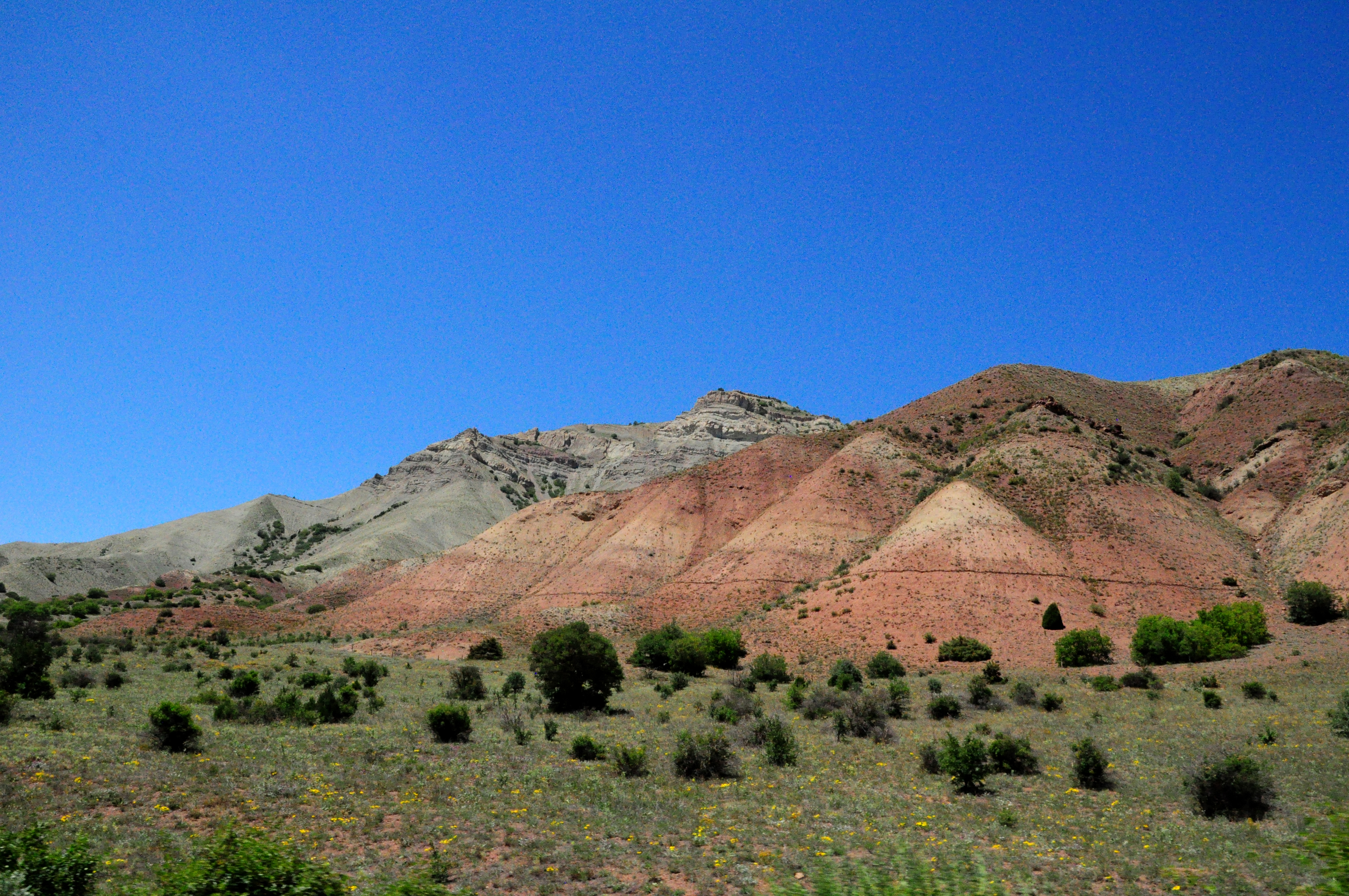
- Kemah, Erzincan

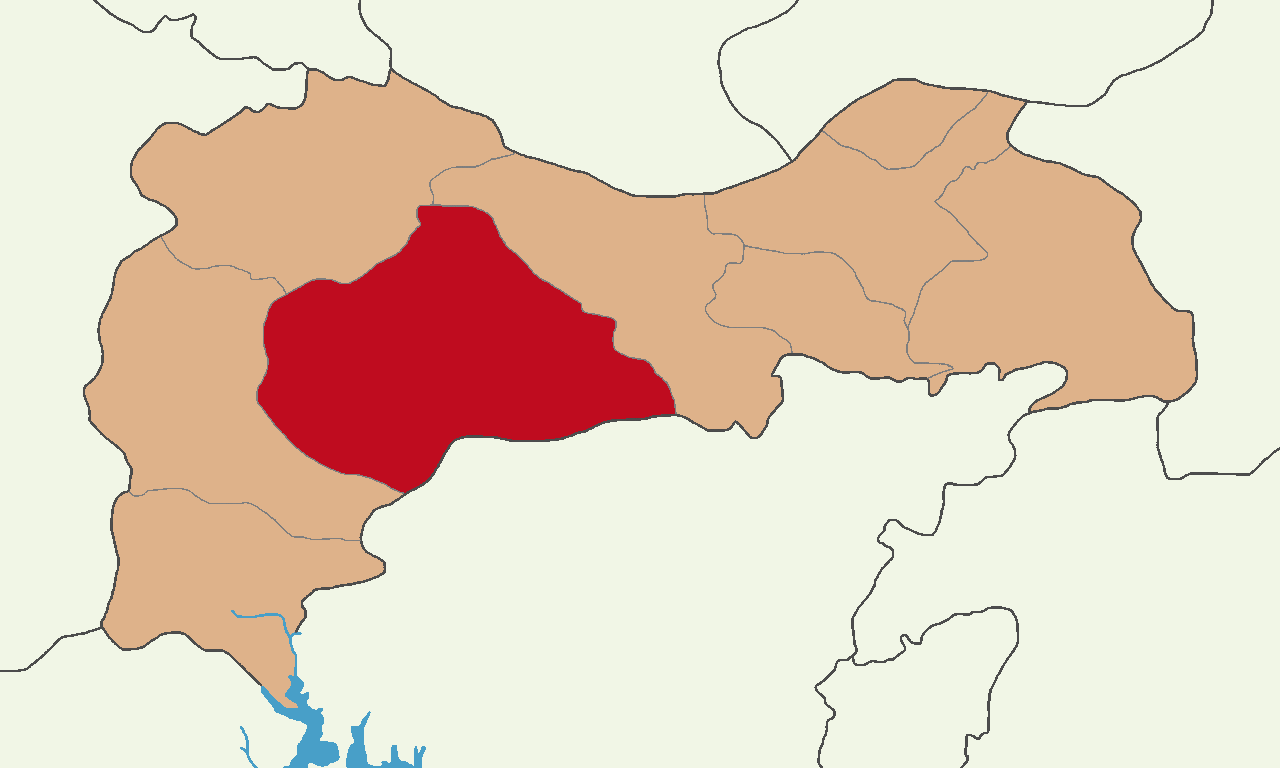
- Map showing Kemah District in Erzincan Province

- Location within Turkey
- Coordinates: 39°36′N 39°02′E
- Country: Turkey
- Province: Erzincan
- Seat: Kemah

Government
  - Kaymakam: Muhammet Şükrü Pekpak
- Area: 2,311 km^{2} (892 sq mi)
- Population (2022): 7,363
  - Density: 3.186/km^{2} (8.252/sq mi)
- Time zone: UTC+3 (TRT)
- Website: www.kemah.gov.tr

Kemah District is a district of the Erzincan Province of Turkey. Its seat is the town of Kemah. Its area is 2,311 km^{2}, and its population is 7,363 (2022).

== Composition ==
There is one municipality in Kemah District:

- Kemah

There are 73 villages in Kemah District:

- Ağaçsaray
- Akbudak
- Akça
- Aktaş
- Akyünlü
- Alpköy
- Atma
- Ayranpınar
- Beşikli
- Boğaziçi
- Bozoğlak
- Çakırlar
- Çalgı
- Çalıklar
- Çamlıyayla
- Cevizlik
- Çiğdemli
- Dedek
- Dedeoğlu
- Dereköy
- Dikyamaç
- Doğanbeyli
- Doğanköy
- Doruca
- Dutlu
- Elmalı
- Eriç
- Esimli
- Eskibağlar
- Gediktepe
- Gökkaya
- Gölkaynak
- Gülbahçe
- Hakbilir
- Ilgarlı
- İncedere
- Karacaköy
- Karadağ
- Kardere
- Kayabaşı
- Kazankaya
- Kedek
- Kemeryaka
- Kerer
- Kırıkdere
- Koçkar
- Kömürköy
- Konuksever
- Koruyolu
- Küplü
- Kutluova
- Maksutuşağı
- Mermerli
- Mezraa
- Muratboynu
- Oğuzköy
- Olukpınar
- Özdamar
- Parmakkaya
- Şahintepe
- Sarıyazı
- Seringöze
- Sürekköy
- Tandırbaşı
- Tanköy
- Taşbulak
- Tuzla
- Uluçınar
- Yağca
- Yahşiler
- Yardere
- Yastıktepe
- Yücebelen
