= İncedere, Kemah =

Village in Turkey

İncedere
- Village
- Location in Turkey
- Coordinates: 39.614°N 39.341°E
- Country: Turkey
- Province: Erzincan
- District: Kemah
- Population (2022): 15
- Time zone: UTC+3 (TRT)

İncedere (Kurdish: Dere Tinixi) is a village in the Kemah District of Erzincan Province in Turkey. The village is populated by Kurds and had a population of 15 in 2021.

The hamlet of Nadaroğlu is attached to the village. Nadaroğlu is populated by Kurds of the Çarekan tribe.
