= Yücebelen, Kemah =

Village in Turkey

Yücebelen
- Village
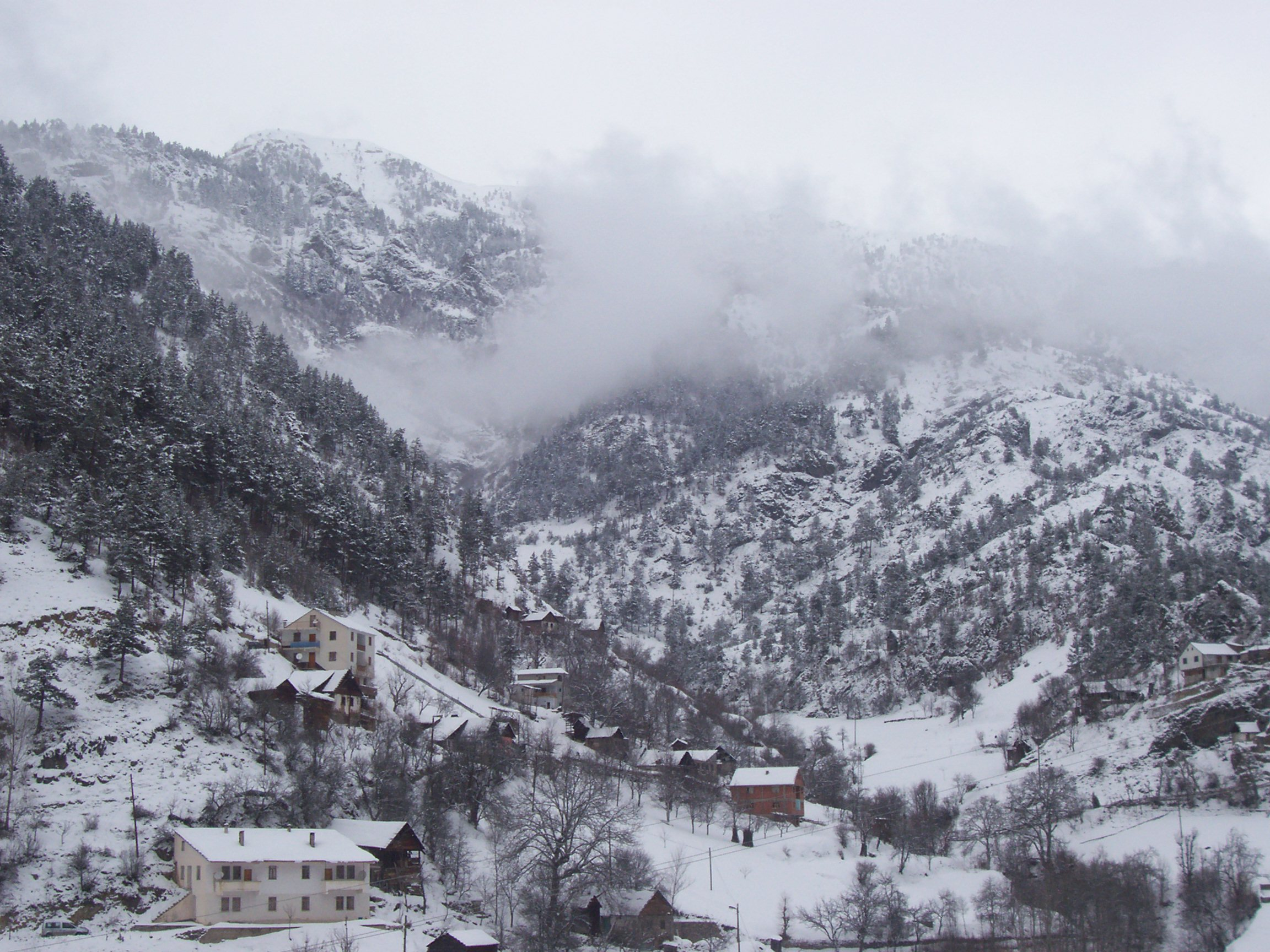

- Location within Turkey
- Coordinates: 39.442°N 38.948°E
- Country: Turkey
- Province: Erzincan
- District: Kemah
- Population (2022): 136
- Time zone: UTC+3 (TRT)

Yücebelen is a village in the Kemah District of Erzincan Province in Turkey. Its population is 136 (2022).
