= Eldere, Dinar =

Eldere
- Village
- Location within Turkey Location within Turkey Aegean
- Coordinates: 38°05′N 30°18′E
- Country: Turkey
- Province: Afyonkarahisar
- District: Dinar
- Population (2021): 34
- Time zone: UTC+3 (TRT)

Eldere is a village in the Dinar District, Afyonkarahisar Province, Turkey. Its population is 34 (2021).
