= Örencik, Daday =

Village in Turkey

Örencik
- Village
- Location in Turkey
- Coordinates: 41.419°N 33.382°E
- Country: Turkey
- Province: Kastamonu
- District: Daday
- Population (2021): 79
- Time zone: UTC+3 (TRT)

Örencik is a village in the Daday District of Kastamonu Province in Turkey. Its population was 79 in 2021.
