= Yıprak, Dinar =

Yıprak
- Village
- Location within Turkey Location within Turkey Aegean
- Coordinates: 38°19′57″N 30°27′47″E
- Country: Turkey
- Province: Afyonkarahisar
- District: Dinar
- Population (2021): 1,565
- Time zone: UTC+3 (TRT)

Yıprak is a village in the Dinar District, Afyonkarahisar Province, Turkey. Its population is 1,565 (2021). Before the 2013 reorganisation, it was a town (belde).
