= Tatarlı, Dinar =

Tatarlı
- Municipality
- Location in Turkey Tatarlı (Turkey Aegean)
- Coordinates: 38.2432°N 30.4946°E
- Country: Turkey
- Province: Afyonkarahisar
- District: Dinar
- Population (2021): 2,899
- Time zone: UTC+3 (TRT)

Tatarlı is a town (belde) and municipality in the Dinar District, Afyonkarahisar Province, Turkey. Its population is 2,899 (2021).
