= Kızsini, Daday =

Village in Turkey

Kızsini
- Village
- Location in Turkey
- Coordinates: 41°33′11″N 33°27′17″E
- Country: Turkey
- Province: Kastamonu
- District: Daday
- Population (2021): 83
- Time zone: UTC+3 (TRT)

Kızsini is a village in the Daday District of Kastamonu Province in Turkey. Its population was 83 in 2021.
