= Kapaklı, Daday =

Village in Turkey

Kapaklı
- Village
- Location in Turkey
- Coordinates: 41.452°N 33.203°E
- Country: Turkey
- Province: Kastamonu
- District: Daday
- Population (2021): 101
- Time zone: UTC+3 (TRT)

Kapaklı is a village in the Daday District of Kastamonu Province in Turkey. Its population was 101 in 2021.
