= Uluçınar, Kemah =

Village in Turkey

Uluçınar
- Village
- Location in Turkey
- Coordinates: 39.599°N 39.160°E
- Country: Turkey
- Province: Erzincan
- District: Kemah
- Population (2022): 33
- Time zone: UTC+3 (TRT)

Uluçınar (Kurdish: Hoxut) is a village in the Kemah District of Erzincan Province in Turkey. The village is populated by Kurds of the Aslanan tribe and had a population of 33 in 2022.
