= Doruca, Kemah =

Village in Turkey

Doruca
- Village
- Location in Turkey
- Coordinates: 39°27′29″N 38°45′16″E
- Country: Turkey
- Province: Erzincan
- District: Kemah
- Population (2022): 8
- Time zone: UTC+3 (TRT)

Doruca is a village in the Kemah District of Erzincan Province in Turkey. Its population is 8 (2022).
