= Bozoğlak, Kemah =

Village in Turkey

Bozoğlak
- Village
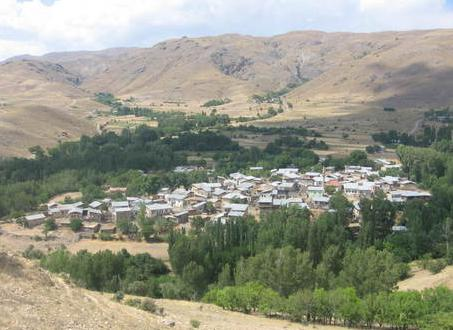

- Location within Turkey
- Coordinates: 39.6294°N 38.8112°E
- Country: Turkey
- Province: Erzincan
- District: Kemah
- Population (2022): 65
- Time zone: UTC+3 (TRT)

Bozoğlak is a village in the Kemah District of Erzincan Province in Turkey. Its population is 65 (2022).
