= Belenalan, Osmaneli =

Belenalan
- Village
- Location within Turkey Location within Marmara
- Coordinates: 40.3167°N 29.9046°E
- Country: Turkey
- Province: Bilecik
- District: Osmaneli
- Population (2021): 147
- Time zone: UTC+3 (TRT)

Belenalan is a village in the Osmaneli District, Bilecik Province, Turkey. Its population is 147 (2021).
