= Çalıklar, Kemah =

Village in Turkey

Çalıklar
- Village
- Location in Turkey
- Coordinates: 39.8333°N 39.0497°E
- Country: Turkey
- Province: Erzincan
- District: Kemah
- Population (2022): 37
- Time zone: UTC+3 (TRT)

Çalıklar is a village in the Kemah District of Erzincan Province in Turkey. The village is populated by Kurds of the Şadiyan tribe and had a population of 37 in 2022.
