= Hisarcık, Osmaneli =

Hisarcık
- Village
- Location within Turkey Location within Marmara
- Coordinates: 40.4642°N 29.9214°E
- Country: Turkey
- Province: Bilecik
- District: Osmaneli
- Population (2021): 636
- Time zone: UTC+3 (TRT)

Hisarcık is a village in the Osmaneli District, Bilecik Province, Turkey. Its population is 636 (2021).
