= Dedek, Kemah =

Village in Turkey

Dedek
- Village
- Location in Turkey
- Coordinates: 39°33′42″N 38°59′30″E
- Country: Turkey
- Province: Erzincan
- District: Kemah
- Population (2022): 27
- Time zone: UTC+3 (TRT)

Dedek is a village in the Kemah District of Erzincan Province in Turkey. Its population is 27 (2022).
