= Hakbilir, Kemah =

Village in Turkey

Hakbilir
- Village
- Location in Turkey
- Coordinates: 39°41′N 38°54′E
- Country: Turkey
- Province: Erzincan
- District: Kemah
- Population (2022): 173
- Time zone: UTC+3 (TRT)

Hakbilir is a village in the Kemah District of Erzincan Province in Turkey. Its population is 173 (2022).
