= Boyunkaya, Osmaneli =

Boyunkaya
- Village
- Location within Turkey Location within Marmara
- Coordinates: 40°28′N 29°54′E
- Country: Turkey
- Province: Bilecik
- District: Osmaneli
- Population (2021): 107
- Time zone: UTC+3 (TRT)

Boyunkaya is a village in the Osmaneli District, Bilecik Province, Turkey. Its population is 107 (2021).
