= Selçik, Osmaneli =

Selçik
- Village
- Location within Turkey Location within Marmara
- Coordinates: 40.3785°N 30.0031°E
- Country: Turkey
- Province: Bilecik
- District: Osmaneli
- Population (2021): 294
- Time zone: UTC+3 (TRT)

Selçik is a village in the Osmaneli District, Bilecik Province, Turkey. Its population is 294 (2021).
