= Borcak, Osmaneli =

Borcak
- Village
- Location within Turkey Location within Marmara
- Coordinates: 40.3585°N 30.1304°E
- Country: Turkey
- Province: Bilecik
- District: Osmaneli
- Population (2021): 84
- Time zone: UTC+3 (TRT)

Borcak (also: Borucak) is a village in the Osmaneli District, Bilecik Province, Turkey. Its population is 84 (2021).
