= Bağcılar, Dinar =

Bağcılar
- Village
- Location within Turkey Location within Turkey Aegean
- Coordinates: 38.1812°N 30.3325°E
- Country: Turkey
- Province: Afyonkarahisar
- District: Dinar
- Population (2021): 195
- Time zone: UTC+3 (TRT)

Bağcılar is a village in the Dinar District, Afyonkarahisar Province, Turkey. Its population is 195 (2021).
