= Değirmencik, Daday =

Village in Turkey

Değirmencik
- Village
- Location in Turkey
- Coordinates: 41.393°N 33.192°E
- Country: Turkey
- Province: Kastamonu
- District: Daday
- Population (2021): 210
- Time zone: UTC+3 (TRT)

Değirmencik is a village in the Daday District of Kastamonu Province in Turkey. Its population was 210 in 2021.
