= Bezirgan, Daday =

Village in Turkey

Bezirgan
- Village
- Location in Turkey
- Coordinates: 41°22′50″N 33°25′04″E
- Country: Turkey
- Province: Kastamonu
- District: Daday
- Population (2021): 92
- Time zone: UTC+3 (TRT)

Bezirgan is a village in the Daday District of Kastamonu Province in Turkey. Its population was 92 in 2021.
