= Kızıllı, Dinar =

Kızıllı
- Village
- Location within Turkey Location within Turkey Aegean
- Coordinates: 38.1364°N 30.1125°E
- Country: Turkey
- Province: Afyonkarahisar
- District: Dinar
- Population (2021): 167
- Time zone: UTC+3 (TRT)

Kızıllı is a village in the Dinar District, Afyonkarahisar Province, Turkey. Its population is 167 (2021).
