= Göçerli, Dinar =

Göçerli
- Village
- Location within Turkey Location within Turkey Aegean
- Coordinates: 38.2975°N 30.4499°E
- Country: Turkey
- Province: Afyonkarahisar
- District: Dinar
- Population (2021): 1,093
- Time zone: UTC+3 (TRT)

Göçerli is a village in the Dinar District, Afyonkarahisar Province, Turkey. Its population is 1,093 (2021).
