= Günüören, Osmaneli =

Günüören
- Village
- Location within Turkey Location within Marmara
- Coordinates: 40°18′10″N 29°59′48″E
- Country: Turkey
- Province: Bilecik
- District: Osmaneli
- Elevation: 380 m (1,250 ft)
- Population (2024): 38
- Time zone: UTC+3 (TRT)
- Postal code: 11502

Günüören is a village in the Osmaneli District, Bilecik Province, Turkey. Its population is 38 (2024).

== History ==
The old name of the village was Günüviran, according to records. Previously connected to Bilecik District, it was connected to Osmaneli on March 18, 1946.

== Demographics ==
Historical Population
2024	38
2000	107
1990	164
1985	181
1980	261
1975	266
1970	386
1965	452
