= Körpeli, Dinar =

Körpeli
- Village
- Location within Turkey Location within Turkey Aegean
- Coordinates: 37°55′53″N 30°8′5″E
- Country: Turkey
- Province: Afyonkarahisar
- District: Dinar
- Population (2021): 31
- Time zone: UTC+3 (TRT)

Körpeli is a village in the Dinar District, Afyonkarahisar Province, Turkey. Its population is 31 (2021).
