= Kınıkyeri, Çameli =

Village in Turkey

Kınıkyeri
- Neighbourhood
- Country: Turkey
- Province: Denizli
- District: Çameli
- Population (2022): 194
- Time zone: UTC+3 (TRT)

Kınıkyeri is a neighbourhood in the municipality and district of Çameli, Denizli Province in Turkey. Its population is 194 (2022).
