= Bademli, Dinar =

Bademli
- Village
- Location within Turkey Location within Turkey Aegean
- Coordinates: 37.9667°N 30.0931°E
- Country: Turkey
- Province: Afyonkarahisar
- District: Dinar
- Population (2021): 302
- Time zone: UTC+3 (TRT)

Bademli is a village in the Dinar District, Afyonkarahisar Province, Turkey. Its population is 302 (2021).
