= Delicegüney, Harmancık =

Village in Turkey

Delicegüney
- Neighbourhood
- Country: Turkey
- Province: Bursa
- District: Harmancık
- Population (2022): 29
- Time zone: UTC+3 (TRT)

Delicegüney is a neighbourhood in the municipality and district of Harmancık, Bursa Province in Turkey. Its population is 29 (2022).
