= Mezraa, Kemah =

Village in Turkey

Mezraa
- Village
- Location in Turkey
- Coordinates: 39.671°N 39.320°E
- Country: Turkey
- Province: Erzincan
- District: Kemah
- Population (2022): 30
- Time zone: UTC+3 (TRT)

Mezraa (Kurdish: Mezre) is a village in the Kemah District of Erzincan Province in Turkey. The village is populated by Kurds of the Tahsuran tribe and had a population of 30 in 2022.
