= Selimiye, Osmaneli =

Selimiye
- Village
- Location within Turkey Location within Marmara
- Coordinates: 40.3320°N 30.0602°E
- Country: Turkey
- Province: Bilecik
- District: Osmaneli
- Population (2021): 295
- Time zone: UTC+3 (TRT)

Selimiye is a village in the Osmaneli District, Bilecik Province, Turkey. Its population is 295 (2021).
