= Sütlaç, Dinar =

Sütlaç
- Village
- Location within Turkey Location within Turkey Aegean
- Coordinates: 38°06′N 30°00′E
- Country: Turkey
- Province: Afyonkarahisar
- District: Dinar
- Population (2021): 277
- Time zone: UTC+3 (TRT)

Sütlaç is a village in the Dinar District, Afyonkarahisar Province, Turkey. Its population is 277 (2021).
