= Bülüçalanı, Dinar =

Bülüçalanı
- Village
- Location within Turkey Location within Turkey Aegean
- Coordinates: 38.0492°N 30.1950°E
- Country: Turkey
- Province: Afyonkarahisar
- District: Dinar
- Population (2021): 286
- Time zone: UTC+3 (TRT)

Bülüçalanı (also: Bülücalan) is a village in the Dinar District, Afyonkarahisar Province, Turkey. Its population is 286 (2021).
