= Kedek, Kemah =

Village in Turkey

Kedek
- Village
- Location in Turkey
- Coordinates: 39.832°N 39.030°E
- Country: Turkey
- Province: Erzincan
- District: Kemah
- Population (2022): 36
- Time zone: UTC+3 (TRT)

Kedek is a village in the Kemah District of Erzincan Province in Turkey. The village is populated by Kurds of the Şadiyan tribe and had a population of 36 in 2022.

The hamlet of Gavuryurdu is attached to the village.
