= Karabedir, Dinar =

Karabedir
- Village
- Location within Turkey Location within Turkey Aegean
- Coordinates: 38.1348°N 30.2695°E
- Country: Turkey
- Province: Afyonkarahisar
- District: Dinar
- Population (2021): 143
- Time zone: UTC+3 (TRT)

Karabedir is a village in the Dinar District, Afyonkarahisar Province, Turkey. Its population is 143 (2021).
