= Karakuyu, Dinar =

Karakuyu
- Village
- Location within Turkey Location within Turkey Aegean
- Coordinates: 38.0900°N 30.2167°E
- Country: Turkey
- Province: Afyonkarahisar
- District: Dinar
- Population (2021): 112
- Time zone: UTC+3 (TRT)

Karakuyu is a village in the Dinar District, Afyonkarahisar Province, Turkey. Its population is 112 (2021).
