= Seringöze, Kemah =

Village in Turkey

Seringöze
- Village
- Location in Turkey
- Coordinates: 39°38′N 38°46′E
- Country: Turkey
- Province: Erzincan
- District: Kemah
- Population (2022): 80
- Time zone: UTC+3 (TRT)

Seringöze is a village in the Kemah District of Erzincan Province in Turkey. Its population is 80 (2022).
