= Ayranpınar, Kemah =

Village in Turkey

Ayranpınar
- Village
- Location in Turkey
- Coordinates: 39.6349°N 38.9986°E
- Country: Turkey
- Province: Erzincan
- District: Kemah
- Population (2022): 63
- Time zone: UTC+3 (TRT)

Ayranpınar is a village in the Kemah District of Erzincan Province in Turkey. Its population is 63 (2022).
