= Ertaş, Daday =

Village in Turkey

Ertaş
- Village
- Location in Turkey
- Coordinates: 41°22′04″N 33°22′22″E
- Country: Turkey
- Province: Kastamonu
- District: Daday
- Population (2021): 48
- Time zone: UTC+3 (TRT)

Ertaş is a village in the Daday District of Kastamonu Province in Turkey. Its population was 48 in 2021.
