= Eriç, Kemah =

Village in Turkey

Eriç
- Village
- Location in Turkey
- Coordinates: 39°30′39″N 38°53′00″E
- Country: Turkey
- Province: Erzincan
- District: Kemah
- Population (2022): 40
- Time zone: UTC+3 (TRT)

Eriç is a village in the Kemah District of Erzincan Province in Turkey. Its population is 40 (2022).
