= Gençali, Dinar =

Gençali
- Village
- Location within Turkey Location within Turkey Aegean
- Coordinates: 38.0119°N 30.0575°E
- Country: Turkey
- Province: Afyonkarahisar
- District: Dinar
- Population (2021): 228
- Time zone: UTC+3 (TRT)

Gençali (also: Genceli) is a village in the Dinar District, Afyonkarahisar Province, Turkey. Its population is 228 (2021).
