= Gölkaynak, Kemah =

Village in Turkey

Gölkaynak
- Village
- Location in Turkey
- Coordinates: 39°37′N 38°57′E
- Country: Turkey
- Province: Erzincan
- District: Kemah
- Population (2022): 57
- Time zone: UTC+3 (TRT)

Gölkaynak is a village in the Kemah District of Erzincan Province in Turkey. Its population is 57 (2022).
