= Esimli, Kemah =

Village in Turkey

Esimli
- Village
- Location in Turkey
- Coordinates: 39.623°N 39.230°E
- Country: Turkey
- Province: Erzincan
- District: Kemah
- Population (2022): 106
- Time zone: UTC+3 (TRT)

Esimli (Kurdish: Birastik) is a village in the Kemah District of Erzincan Province in Turkey. The village is populated by Kurds and had a population of 106 in 2022.
