= Afşar, Dinar =

Afşar
- Village
- Location within Turkey Location within Turkey Aegean
- Coordinates: 38.20317°N 30.18347°E
- Country: Turkey
- Province: Afyonkarahisar
- District: Dinar
- Population (2021): 190
- Time zone: UTC+3 (TRT)

Afşar is a village in the Dinar District, Afyonkarahisar Province, Turkey. Its population is 190 as of 2021.
