= Kutluova, Kemah =

Village in Turkey

Kutluova
- Village
- Location in Turkey
- Coordinates: 39°44′N 39°02′E
- Country: Turkey
- Province: Erzincan
- District: Kemah
- Population (2022): 17
- Time zone: UTC+3 (TRT)

Kutluova is a village in the Kemah District of Erzincan Province in Turkey. Its population is 17 (2022).
