= Çağlayan, Dinar =

Çağlayan
- Village
- Location within Turkey Location within Turkey Aegean
- Coordinates: 38.1707°N 30.1795°E
- Country: Turkey
- Province: Afyonkarahisar
- District: Dinar
- Population (2021): 185
- Time zone: UTC+3 (TRT)

Çağlayan is a village in the Dinar District, Afyonkarahisar Province, Turkey. Its population is 185 (2021).
