= Kolak, Çameli =

Village in Turkey

Kolak
- Neighbourhood
- Location in Turkey Kolak (Turkey Aegean)
- Coordinates: 37°05′N 29°12′E
- Country: Turkey
- Province: Denizli
- District: Çameli
- Population (2022): 745
- Time zone: UTC+3 (TRT)

Kolak is a neighbourhood in the municipality and district of Çameli, Denizli Province in Turkey. Its population is 745 (2022).

Latitude: 38° 0' 29" N

Longitude: 33° 44' 36" E
