= Tuzla, Kemah =

Village in Turkey

Tuzla
- Village
- Location in Turkey
- Coordinates: 39.633°N 39.083°E
- Country: Turkey
- Province: Erzincan
- District: Kemah
- Population (2022): 43
- Time zone: UTC+3 (TRT)

Tuzla is a village in the Kemah District of Erzincan Province in Turkey. Its population is 43 (2022).
