= Atma, Kemah =

Village in Turkey

Atma
- Village
- Location in Turkey
- Coordinates: 39.5803°N 38.7894°E
- Country: Turkey
- Province: Erzincan
- District: Kemah
- Population (2022): 35
- Time zone: UTC+3 (TRT)

Atma is a village in the Kemah District of Erzincan Province in Turkey. Its population is 35 (2022).
