= Karaağaç, Daday =

Village in Turkey

Karaağaç
- Village
- Location in Turkey
- Coordinates: 41.481°N 33.158°E
- Country: Turkey
- Province: Kastamonu
- District: Daday
- Population (2021): 84
- Time zone: UTC+3 (TRT)

Karaağaç is a village in the Daday District of Kastamonu Province in Turkey. Its population was 84 in 2021.
