= Selalmaz, Daday =

Village in Turkey

Selalmaz
- Village
- Location in Turkey
- Coordinates: 41.472°N 33.175°E
- Country: Turkey
- Province: Kastamonu
- District: Daday
- Population (2021): 105
- Time zone: UTC+3 (TRT)

Selalmaz is a village in the Daday District of Kastamonu Province in Turkey. Its population was 105 in 2021.
