= Ağlan, Osmaneli =

Ağlan
- Village
- Location within Turkey Location within Marmara
- Coordinates: 40°29′N 29°58′E
- Country: Turkey
- Province: Bilecik
- District: Osmaneli
- Population (2021): 222
- Time zone: UTC+3 (TRT)

Ağlan is a village in the Osmaneli District, Bilecik Province, Turkey. Its population is 222 (2021).
