= Yeşilçat, Dinar =

Yeşilçat
- Village
- Location within Turkey Location within Turkey Aegean
- Coordinates: 37.9978°N 30.1729°E
- Country: Turkey
- Province: Afyonkarahisar
- District: Dinar
- Population (2021): 265
- Time zone: UTC+3 (TRT)

Yeşilçat is a village in the Dinar District, Afyonkarahisar Province, Turkey. Its population is 265 (2021).
