= Cerityaylası, Dinar =

Cerityaylası
- Village
- Location within Turkey Location within Turkey Aegean
- Coordinates: 38°11′N 30°06′E
- Country: Turkey
- Province: Afyonkarahisar
- District: Dinar
- Population (2021): 137
- Time zone: UTC+3 (TRT)

Cerityaylası is a village in the Dinar District, Afyonkarahisar Province, Turkey. Its population is 137 (2021).
