= Dedeoğlu, Kemah =

Village in Turkey

Dedeoğlu
- Village
- Location in Turkey
- Coordinates: 39°44′51″N 38°58′48″E
- Country: Turkey
- Province: Erzincan
- District: Kemah
- Population (2022): 65
- Time zone: UTC+3 (TRT)

Dedeoğlu is a village in the Kemah District of Erzincan Province, Turkey. Its population is 65 (2022).
