= Osmaneli District =

District of Bilecik Province, Turkey

- District
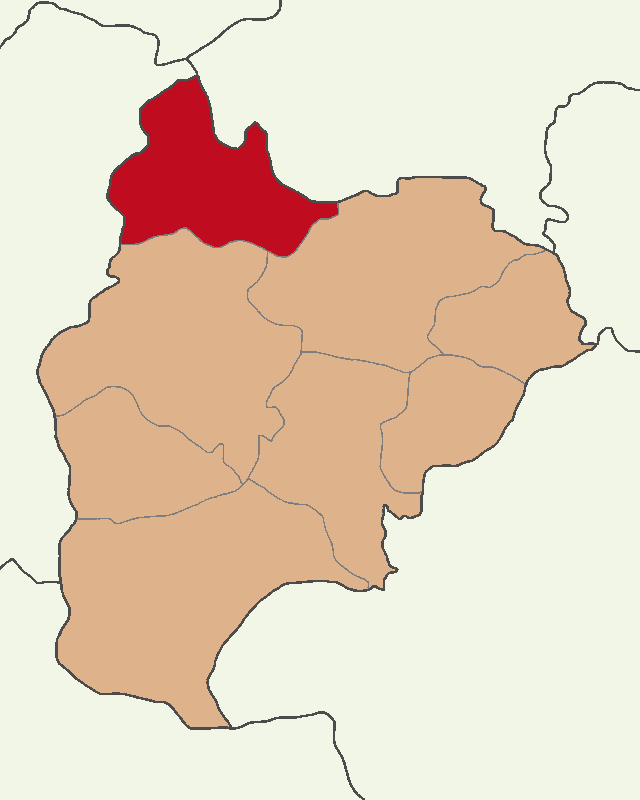
- Map showing Osmaneli District in Bilecik Province

- Location in Turkey Osmaneli District (Marmara)
- Coordinates: 40°21′N 30°1′E
- Country: Turkey
- Province: Bilecik
- Seat: Osmaneli

Government
  - Kaymakam: Yüksel Ünal
- Area: 490 km^{2} (190 sq mi)
- Population (2021): 21,497
  - Density: 44/km^{2} (110/sq mi)
- Time zone: UTC+3 (TRT)
- Website: www.osmaneli.gov.tr

Osmaneli District is a district of Bilecik Province of Turkey. Its seat is the town Osmaneli. Its area is 490 km^{2}, and its population is 21,497 (2021).

== Composition ==
There is one municipality in Osmaneli District:

- Osmaneli

There are 27 villages in Osmaneli District:

- Adliye
- Ağlan
- Akçapınar
- Avdan
- Balçıkhisar
- Belenalan
- Bereket
- Borcak
- Boyunkaya
- Büyükyenice
- Çerkeşli
- Ciciler
- Çiftlik
- Dereyörük
- Düzmeşe
- Ericek
- Günüören
- Hisarcık
- Kazancı
- Kızılöz
- Medetli
- Oğulpaşa
- Orhaniye
- Sarıyazı
- Selçik
- Selimiye
- Soğucakpınar
