= Elmalı, Çameli =

Village in Turkey

Elmalı
- Neighbourhood
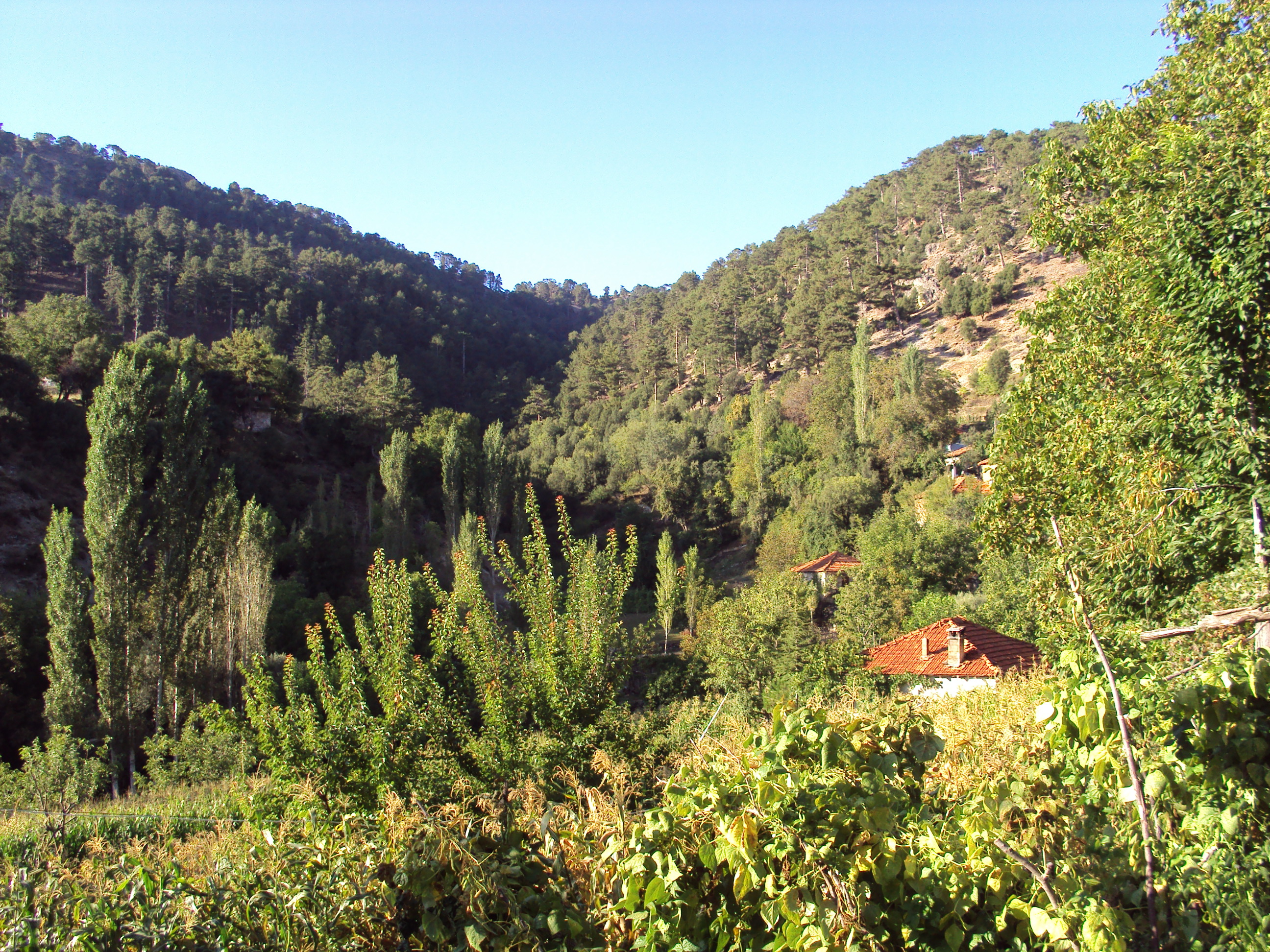

- Location within Turkey Location within Turkey Aegean
- Coordinates: 36°57′14″N 29°14′17″E
- Country: Turkey
- Province: Denizli
- District: Çameli
- Population (2022): 1,269
- Time zone: UTC+3 (TRT)

Elmalı is a neighbourhood in the municipality and district of Çameli, Denizli Province in Turkey. Its population is 1,269 (2022).
