= Okçular, Dinar =

Okçular
- Village
- Location within Turkey Location within Turkey Aegean
- Coordinates: 38.2196°N 30.4236°E
- Country: Turkey
- Province: Afyonkarahisar
- District: Dinar
- Population (2021): 312
- Time zone: UTC+3 (TRT)

Okçular is a village in the Dinar District, Afyonkarahisar Province, Turkey. Its population is 312 (2021).
