= Çakmak, Harmancık =

Village in Turkey

Çakmak
- Neighbourhood
- Country: Turkey
- Province: Bursa
- District: Harmancık
- Population (2022): 167
- Time zone: UTC+3 (TRT)

Çakmak is a neighbourhood in the municipality and district of Harmancık, Bursa Province in Turkey. Its population is 167 (2022).
