= Halvan =

Halvan, Helwan, Holwan, or Haluan (Persian: حلوان) may refer to:

- Haluan (newspaper), a daily newspaper in Padang, Indonesia
- Halvan, Kurdistan, Iran
- Halvan, South Khorasan, Iran
- Hulwan, an ancient town in Iran
- Helwan, a city in Egypt
- Qism Helwan, a District in Egypt
- Helwan, a licensed copy of the Beretta M1951 pistol
