= Maksutuşağı, Kemah =

Village in Turkey

Maksutuşağı
- Village
- Location in Turkey
- Coordinates: 39.604°N 39.186°E
- Country: Turkey
- Province: Erzincan
- District: Kemah
- Population (2022): 134
- Time zone: UTC+3 (TRT)

Maksutuşağı is a village in the Kemah District of Erzincan Province in Turkey. The village is populated by Kurds and had a population of 134 in 2022.

The hamlet of Köseler is attached to the village and also populated by Kurds.
