= Bıçakçı, Çameli =

Village in Turkey

Bıçakçı
- Neighbourhood
- Location in Turkey Bıçakçı (Turkey Aegean)
- Coordinates: 37.0369°N 29.3210°E
- Country: Turkey
- Province: Denizli
- District: Çameli
- Population (2022): 279
- Time zone: UTC+3 (TRT)

Bıçakçı is a neighbourhood in the municipality and district of Çameli, Denizli Province in Turkey. Its population is 279 (2022).
