= Orhaniye, Osmaneli =

Orhaniye
- Village
- Location within Turkey Location within Marmara
- Coordinates: 40.3363°N 29.8763°E
- Country: Turkey
- Province: Bilecik
- District: Osmaneli
- Population (2021): 80
- Time zone: UTC+3 (TRT)

Orhaniye is a village in the Osmaneli District, Bilecik Province, Turkey. Its population is 80 (2021).
