= Gökçeli, Dinar =

Gökçeli
- Village
- Location within Turkey Location within Turkey Aegean
- Coordinates: 38°04′33″N 30°14′32″E
- Country: Turkey
- Province: Afyonkarahisar
- District: Dinar
- Population (2021): 37
- Time zone: UTC+3 (TRT)

Gökçeli is a village in the Dinar District, Afyonkarahisar Province, Turkey. Its population is 37 (2021).
