= Yeşilhüyük, Dinar =

Yeşilhüyük
- Village
- Location within Turkey Location within Turkey Aegean
- Coordinates: 38°09′N 30°02′E
- Country: Turkey
- Province: Afyonkarahisar
- District: Dinar
- Population (2021): 423
- Time zone: UTC+3 (TRT)

Yeşilhüyük is a village in the Dinar District, Afyonkarahisar Province, Turkey. Its population is 423 (2021).
