= Tugaylı, Dinar =

Tugaylı
- Village
- Location within Turkey Location within Turkey Aegean
- Coordinates: 38°06′N 30°06′E
- Country: Turkey
- Province: Afyonkarahisar
- District: Dinar
- Population (2021): 64
- Time zone: UTC+3 (TRT)

Tugaylı is a village in the Dinar District, Afyonkarahisar Province, Turkey. Its population is 64 (2021).
