= Kadılar, Dinar =

Kadılar
- Village
- Location within Turkey Location within Turkey Aegean
- Coordinates: 38.208889°N 30.450833°E
- Country: Turkey
- Province: Afyonkarahisar
- District: Dinar
- Population (2021): 515
- Time zone: UTC+3 (TRT)

Kadılar is a village in the Dinar District, Afyonkarahisar Province, Turkey. Its population is 515 (2021). Before the 2013 reorganisation, it was a town (belde).
