= Ergenli, Dinar =

Ergenli
- Village
- Location within Turkey Location within Turkey Aegean
- Coordinates: 38.1863°N 30.3792°E
- Country: Turkey
- Province: Afyonkarahisar
- District: Dinar
- Population (2021): 52
- Time zone: UTC+3 (TRT)

Ergenli is a village in the Dinar District, Afyonkarahisar Province, Turkey. Its population is 52 (2021).
