= Sürekköy, Kemah =

Village in Turkey

Sürekköy
- Village
- Location in Turkey
- Coordinates: 39.653°N 39.326°E
- Country: Turkey
- Province: Erzincan
- District: Kemah
- Population (2022): 29
- Time zone: UTC+3 (TRT)

Sürekköy is a village in the Kemah District of Erzincan Province in Turkey. The village is populated by Kurds of the Tahsuran tribe and had a population of 29 in 2022.
