= Akbudak, Kemah =

Village in Turkey

Akbudak
- Village
- Location in Turkey
- Coordinates: 39.8026°N 39.0649°E
- Country: Turkey
- Province: Erzincan
- District: Kemah
- Population (2022): 29
- Time zone: UTC+3 (TRT)

Akbudak is a village in the Kemah District of Erzincan Province in Turkey. Its population is 29 (2022).
