= Şahintepe, Kemah =

Village in Turkey

Şahintepe
- Village
- Location in Turkey
- Coordinates: 39.516°N 38.787°E
- Country: Turkey
- Province: Erzincan
- District: Kemah
- Population (2022): 75
- Time zone: UTC+3 (TRT)

Şahintepe is a village in the Kemah District of Erzincan Province in Turkey. Its population is 75 (2022).
