= Çerkeşli, Osmaneli =

Çerkeşli
- Village
- Location within Turkey Location within Marmara
- Coordinates: 40.4362°N 29.9667°E
- Country: Turkey
- Province: Bilecik
- District: Osmaneli
- Population (2021): 509
- Time zone: UTC+3 (TRT)

Çerkeşli is a village in the Osmaneli District, Bilecik Province, Turkey. Its population is 509 (2021).
