= Kazancı, Osmaneli =

Kazancı
- Village
- Location within Turkey Location within Marmara
- Coordinates: 40.3362°N 30.0955°E
- Country: Turkey
- Province: Bilecik
- District: Osmaneli
- Population (2021): 103
- Time zone: UTC+3 (TRT)

Kazancı is a village in the Osmaneli District, Bilecik Province, Turkey. Its population is 103 (2021).
