= Burunkaya, Dinar =

Burunkaya
- Village
- Location within Turkey Location within Turkey Aegean
- Coordinates: 38°06′N 30°15′E
- Country: Turkey
- Province: Afyonkarahisar
- District: Dinar
- Population (2021): 143
- Time zone: UTC+3 (TRT)

Burunkaya is a village in the Dinar District, Afyonkarahisar Province, Turkey. Its population is 143 (2021).
