= Akça, Dinar =

Akça
- Village
- Location within Turkey Location within Turkey Aegean
- Coordinates: 38.1337°N 30.2413°E
- Country: Turkey
- Province: Afyonkarahisar
- District: Dinar
- Population (2021): 209
- Time zone: UTC+3 (TRT)

Akça is a village in the Dinar District, Afyonkarahisar Province, Turkey. Its population is 209 (2021).
