= Muratboynu, Kemah =

Village in Turkey

Muratboynu
- Village
- Location in Turkey
- Coordinates: 39°33′N 38°58′E
- Country: Turkey
- Province: Erzincan
- District: Kemah
- Population (2022): 86
- Time zone: UTC+3 (TRT)

Muratboynu is a village in the Kemah District of Erzincan Province in Turkey. Its population is 86 (2022).
