= Oğulpaşa, Osmaneli =

Oğulpaşa
- Village
- Location within Turkey Location within Marmara
- Coordinates: 40.4628°N 29.8828°E
- Country: Turkey
- Province: Bilecik
- District: Osmaneli
- Population (2021): 560
- Time zone: UTC+3 (TRT)

Oğulpaşa is a village in the Osmaneli District, Bilecik Province, Turkey. Its population is 560 (2021).
