= Konuksever, Kemah =

Village in Turkey

Konuksever
- Village
- Location in Turkey
- Coordinates: 39.612°N 39.296°E
- Country: Turkey
- Province: Erzincan
- District: Kemah
- Population (2022): 74
- Time zone: UTC+3 (TRT)

Konuksever also known as |Gamarik in armenian is a village in the Kemah District of Erzincan Province in Turkey. The village is populated by Turks of different tribal affiliations and had a population of 74 in 2022.

The hamlet of Yukarıkonuksever is attached to the village.
