= Çiftlik, Osmaneli =

Çiftlik
- Village
- Location within Turkey Location within Marmara
- Coordinates: 40.3728°N 29.8669°E
- Country: Turkey
- Province: Bilecik
- District: Osmaneli
- Population (2021): 69
- Time zone: UTC+3 (TRT)

Çiftlik (also: Çiftlikköy) is a village in the Osmaneli District, Bilecik Province, Turkey. Its population is 69 (2021).
