= Çayüstü, Dinar =

Çayüstü
- Village
- Location within Turkey Location within Turkey Aegean
- Coordinates: 38.2381°N 30.2633°E
- Country: Turkey
- Province: Afyonkarahisar
- District: Dinar
- Population (2021): 167
- Time zone: UTC+3 (TRT)

Çayüstü is a village in the Dinar District, Afyonkarahisar Province, Turkey. Its population is 167 (2021).
