= Kirazlıyayla, Çameli =

Village in Turkey

Kirazlıyayla
- Neighbourhood
- Location in Turkey Kirazlıyayla (Turkey Aegean)
- Coordinates: 36°58′42″N 29°12′10″E
- Country: Turkey
- Province: Denizli
- District: Çameli
- Population (2022): 1,191
- Time zone: UTC+3 (TRT)

Kirazlıyayla is a neighbourhood in the municipality and district of Çameli, Denizli Province in Turkey. Its population is 1,191 (2022).
