= Olukpınar, Kemah =

Village in Turkey

Olukpınar
- Village
- Location in Turkey
- Coordinates: 39°37′N 39°20′E
- Country: Turkey
- Province: Erzincan
- District: Kemah
- Population (2022): 50
- Time zone: UTC+3 (TRT)

Olukpınar (Kurdish: Izinsor) is a village in the Kemah District of Erzincan Province in Turkey. The village is populated by Kurds and had a population of 50 in 2022.

The hamlet of Aksakal is attached to the village.
