= Arabacılar, Daday =

Village in Turkey

Arabacılar
- Village
- Location in Turkey
- Coordinates: 41.513°N 33.490°E
- Country: Turkey
- Province: Kastamonu
- District: Daday
- Population (2021): 92
- Time zone: UTC+3 (TRT)

Arabacılar is a village in the Daday District of Kastamonu Province in Turkey. Its population was 92 in 2021.
