= Karahacılı, Dinar =

Karahacılı
- Village
- Location within Turkey Location within Turkey Aegean
- Coordinates: 38.0392°N 30.0053°E
- Country: Turkey
- Province: Afyonkarahisar
- District: Dinar
- Population (2021): 513
- Time zone: UTC+3 (TRT)

Karahacılı is a village in the Dinar District, Afyonkarahisar Province, Turkey. Its population is 513 (2021).
