= Çobansaray, Dinar =

Çobansaray
- Village
- Location within Turkey Location within Turkey Aegean
- Coordinates: 38.1183°N 30.1908°E
- Country: Turkey
- Province: Afyonkarahisar
- District: Dinar
- Population (2021): 126
- Time zone: UTC+3 (TRT)

Çobansaray is a village in the Dinar District, Afyonkarahisar Province, Turkey. Its population is 126 (2021).
