= Kayabağı, Daday =

Village in Turkey

Kayabağı
- Village
- Location in Turkey
- Coordinates: 41.449°N 33.518°E
- Country: Turkey
- Province: Kastamonu
- District: Daday
- Population (2021): 90
- Time zone: UTC+3 (TRT)

Kayabağı is a village in the Daday District of Kastamonu Province in Turkey. Its population was 90 in 2021.
