= Tanköy, Kemah =

Village in Turkey

Tanköy
- Village
- Location in Turkey
- Coordinates: 39.560°N 39.043°E
- Country: Turkey
- Province: Erzincan
- District: Kemah
- Population (2022): 46
- Time zone: UTC+3 (TRT)

Tanköy is a village in the Kemah District of Erzincan Province in Turkey. Its population is 46 (2022).
