= Cevizlik, Kemah =

Village in Turkey

Cevizlik
- Village
- Location in Turkey
- Coordinates: 39°44′28″N 39°3′43″E
- Country: Turkey
- Province: Erzincan
- District: Kemah
- Population (2022): 77
- Time zone: UTC+3 (TRT)

Cevizlik is a village in the Kemah District of Erzincan Province in Turkey. Its population is 77 (2022).
