= Dumanköy, Dinar =

Dumanköy
- Village
- Location within Turkey Location within Turkey Aegean
- Coordinates: 38°10′14″N 30°1′40″E
- Country: Turkey
- Province: Afyonkarahisar
- District: Dinar
- Population (2021): 260
- Time zone: UTC+3 (TRT)

Dumanköy (also: Duman) is a village in the Dinar District, Afyonkarahisar Province, Turkey. Its population is 260 (2021).
