= Çameli =

- District and municipality
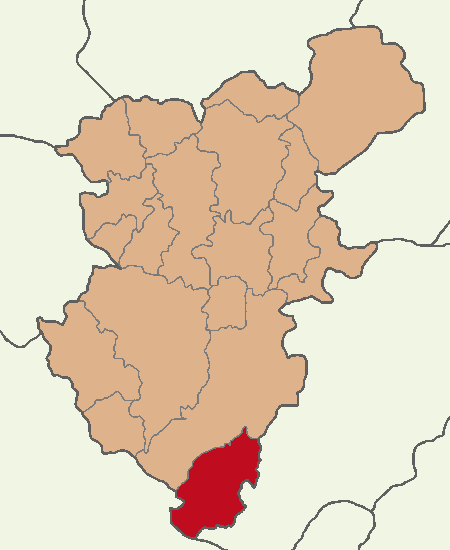
- Map showing Çameli District in Denizli Province

- Location in Turkey Çameli (Turkey Aegean)
- Coordinates: 37°04′15″N 29°20′43″E
- Country: Turkey
- Province: Denizli

Government
  - Mayor: Cengiz Arslan (AKP)
- Area: 758 km^{2} (293 sq mi)
- Population (2022): 17,549
  - Density: 23.2/km^{2} (60.0/sq mi)
- Time zone: UTC+3 (TRT)
- Postal code: 20980
- Area code: 0258
- Website: www.cameli.bel.tr

Çameli is a municipality and district of Denizli Province, Turkey. Its area is 758 km^{2}, and its population is 17,549 (2022). It is a wooded highland area at the western end of the Taurus Mountains.

The highest peak in the district is Akdağ (3213 m). Summers are cool and winters are cold and wet. The area is under snow in winter.

== Composition ==
There are 31 neighbourhoods in Çameli District:

- Akpınar
- Arıkaya
- Ayvacık
- Belevi
- Bıçakçı
- Çamlıbel
- Cevizli
- Çiğdemli
- Cumaalanı
- Elmalı
- Emecik
- Ericek
- Gökçeyaka
- Gürsu
- Güzelyurt
- İmamlar
- Kalınkoz
- Karabayır
- Kınıkyeri
- Kirazlıyayla
- Kızılyaka
- Kocaova
- Kolak
- Sarıkavak
- Sofular
- Taşçılar
- Yaylapınar
- Yeni
- Yeşilyayla
- Yumrutaş
- Yunuspınarı
