= Dereyörük, Osmaneli =

Dereyörük
- Village
- Location within Turkey Location within Marmara
- Coordinates: 40°19′N 29°51′E
- Country: Turkey
- Province: Bilecik
- District: Osmaneli
- Population (2021): 31
- Time zone: UTC+3 (TRT)

Dereyörük (also: Dereyürük) is a village in the Osmaneli District, Bilecik Province, Turkey. Its population is 31 (2021).
