= Koççuğaz, Daday =

Village in Turkey

Koççuğaz
- Village
- Location in Turkey
- Coordinates: 41.498°N 33.176°E
- Country: Turkey
- Province: Kastamonu
- District: Daday
- Population (2021): 73
- Time zone: UTC+3 (TRT)

Koççuğaz is a village in the Daday District of Kastamonu Province in Turkey. Its population was 73 in 2021.
