= Kabaklı, Dinar =

Kabaklı
- Village
- Location within Turkey Location within Turkey Aegean
- Coordinates: 38.1248°N 30.0869°E
- Country: Turkey
- Province: Afyonkarahisar
- District: Dinar
- Population (2021): 70
- Time zone: UTC+3 (TRT)

Kabaklı is a village in the Dinar District, Afyonkarahisar Province, Turkey. Its population is 70 (2021).
