= Cevizli, Çameli =

Village in Turkey

Cevizli
- Neighbourhood
- Country: Turkey
- Province: Denizli
- District: Çameli
- Population (2022): 709
- Time zone: UTC+3 (TRT)

Cevizli is a neighbourhood in the municipality and district of Çameli, Denizli Province in Turkey. Its population is 709 (2022).
