= Yelalan, Dinar =

Yelalan
- Village
- Location within Turkey Location within Turkey Aegean
- Coordinates: 37°57′23″N 30°4′31″E
- Country: Turkey
- Province: Afyonkarahisar
- District: Dinar
- Population (2021): 137
- Time zone: UTC+3 (TRT)

Yelalan is a village in the Dinar District, Afyonkarahisar Province, Turkey. Its population is 137 (2021).
