= Doğanlı, Dinar =

Doğanlı
- Village
- Location within Turkey Location within Turkey Aegean
- Coordinates: 38.2839°N 30.4372°E
- Country: Turkey
- Province: Afyonkarahisar
- District: Dinar
- Population (2021): 850
- Time zone: UTC+3 (TRT)

Doğanlı is a village in the Dinar District, Afyonkarahisar Province, Turkey. Its population is 850 (2021). Before the 2013 reorganisation, it was a town (belde).
