= Tekin, Dinar =

Tekin
- Village
- Location within Turkey Location within Turkey Aegean
- Coordinates: 38°01′N 30°07′E
- Country: Turkey
- Province: Afyonkarahisar
- District: Dinar
- Population (2021): 213
- Time zone: UTC+3 (TRT)

Tekin is a village in the Dinar District, Afyonkarahisar Province, Turkey. Its population is 213 (2021).
