= Yazıcameydan, Daday =

Village in Turkey

Yazıcameydan
- Village
- Location within Turkey
- Coordinates: 41°27′30″N 33°31′17″E
- Country: Turkey
- Province: Kastamonu
- District: Daday
- Population (2021): 97
- Time zone: UTC+3 (TRT)

Yazıcameydan is a village in the Daday District of Kastamonu Province in Turkey. Its population was 97 in 2021.

== Geography ==
The village is 43 km away from Kastamonu city center and 10 km away from Daday district center.

== Population ==
Village population data by year
| 2024 | 95 |
| 2023 | 96 |
| 2022 | 98 |
| 2021 | 97 |
| 2020 | 102 |
| 2019 | 101 |
| 2018 | 106 |
| 2017 | 97 |
| 2016 | 106 |
| 2015 | 96 |
| 2014 | 93 |
| 2013 | 87 |
| 2012 | 99 |
| 2011 | 103 |
| 2010 | 98 |
| 2009 | 102 |
| 2008 | 102 |
| 2007 | 107 |
| 2000 | 82 |
| 1990 | 172 |
| 1985 | 156 |
