= Balatdanişment, Harmancık =

Village in Turkey

Balatdanişment
- Neighbourhood
- Location in Turkey Balatdanişment (Marmara)
- Coordinates: 39°38′N 29°11′E
- Country: Turkey
- Province: Bursa
- District: Harmancık
- Population (2022): 114
- Time zone: UTC+3 (TRT)

Balatdanişment is a neighbourhood in the municipality and district of Harmancık, Bursa Province in Turkey. Its population is 114 (2022).
