= Karadağ, Kemah =

Village in Turkey

Karadağ
- Village
- Location in Turkey
- Coordinates: 39.655°N 39.105°E
- Country: Turkey
- Province: Erzincan
- District: Kemah
- Population (2022): 53
- Time zone: UTC+3 (TRT)

Karadağ is a village in the Kemah District of Erzincan Province in Turkey. Its population is 53 (2022).
