= Kardere, Kemah =

Village in Turkey

Kardere
- Village
- Location in Turkey
- Coordinates: 39.636°N 38.821°E
- Country: Turkey
- Province: Erzincan
- District: Kemah
- Population (2022): 97
- Time zone: UTC+3 (TRT)

Kardere is a village in the Kemah District of Erzincan Province in Turkey. Its population is 97 (2022).
