= Oğuzköy, Kemah =

Village in Turkey

Oğuzköy
- Village
- Location in Turkey
- Coordinates: 39.522°N 38.835°E
- Country: Turkey
- Province: Erzincan
- District: Kemah
- Population (2022): 69
- Time zone: UTC+3 (TRT)

Oğuzköy is a village in the Kemah District of Erzincan Province in Turkey. Its population is 69 (2022).
