= Ilgarlı, Kemah =

Village in Turkey

Ilgarlı
- Village
- Location in Turkey
- Coordinates: 39°43′N 39°01′E
- Country: Turkey
- Province: Erzincan
- District: Kemah
- Population (2022): 7
- Time zone: UTC+3 (TRT)

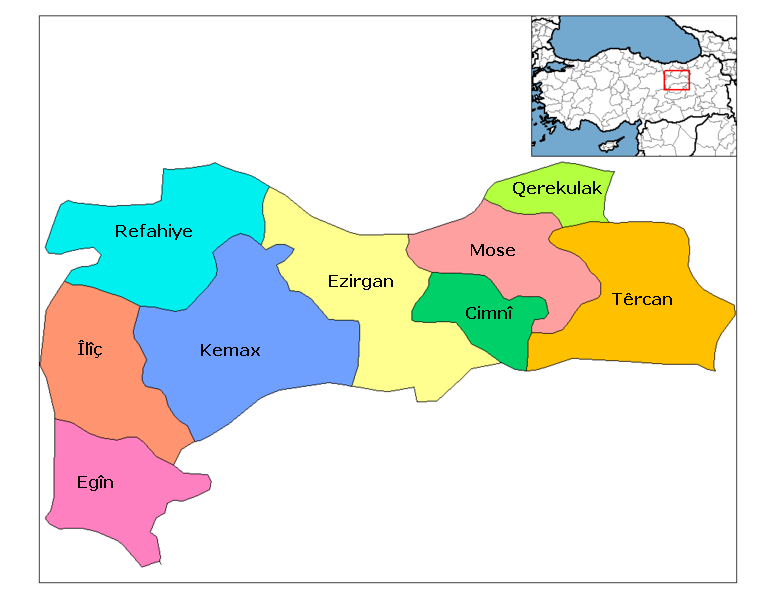

Ilgarlı is a village in the Kemah District of Erzincan Province in Turkey. Its population is 7 (2022). The old name of the village is Poğginer.
