= Elmalı, Kemah =

Village in Turkey

Elmalı
- Village
- Location in Turkey
- Coordinates: 39°47′1″N 38°59′38″E
- Country: Turkey
- Province: Erzincan
- District: Kemah
- Population (2022): 73
- Time zone: UTC+3 (TRT)

Elmalı is a village in the Kemah District of Erzincan Province in Turkey. Its population is 73 (2022).
