= Beşikli, Kemah =

Village in Turkey

Beşikli
- Village
- Location in Turkey
- Coordinates: 39.6526°N 39.2949°E
- Country: Turkey
- Province: Erzincan
- District: Kemah
- Population (2022): 48
- Time zone: UTC+3 (TRT)

Beşikli (Kurdish: Ardos) is a village in the Kemah District of Erzincan Province in Turkey. The village is populated by Kurds of the Sînemilî tribe and had a population of 48 in 2022.
