= Çayırlı, Daday =

Village in Turkey

Çayırlı
- Village
- Location in Turkey
- Coordinates: 41.488°N 33.486°E
- Country: Turkey
- Province: Kastamonu
- District: Daday
- Population (2021): 69
- Time zone: UTC+3 (TRT)

Çayırlı is a village in the Daday District of Kastamonu Province in Turkey. Its population was 69 in 2021.
