= Kozluca, Harmancık =

Village in Turkey

Kozluca
- Neighbourhood
- Location in Turkey Kozluca (Marmara)
- Coordinates: 39.6104°N 29.1568°E
- Country: Turkey
- Province: Bursa
- District: Harmancık
- Population (2022): 71
- Time zone: UTC+3 (TRT)

Kozluca is a neighbourhood in the municipality and district of Harmancık, Bursa Province in Turkey. Its population is 71 (2022).
