= Kızılöz, Osmaneli =

Kızılöz
- Village
- Location within Turkey Location within Marmara
- Coordinates: 40.3947°N 30.0708°E
- Country: Turkey
- Province: Bilecik
- District: Osmaneli
- Population (2021): 26
- Time zone: UTC+3 (TRT)

Kızılöz is a village in the Osmaneli District, Bilecik Province, Turkey. Its population is 26 (2021).
