= Uluköy, Dinar =

Uluköy
- Village
- Location within Turkey Location within Turkey Aegean
- Coordinates: 38.1531°N 30.2425°E
- Country: Turkey
- Province: Afyonkarahisar
- District: Dinar
- Population (2021): 364
- Time zone: UTC+3 (TRT)

Uluköy is a village in the Dinar District, Afyonkarahisar Province, Turkey. Its population is 364 (2021). Before the 2013 reorganisation, it was a town (belde).
