= Yeşilyurt, Dinar =

Yeşilyurt
- Village
- Location within Turkey Location within Turkey Aegean
- Coordinates: 38.1430°N 30.1988°E
- Country: Turkey
- Province: Afyonkarahisar
- District: Dinar
- Population (2021): 41
- Time zone: UTC+3 (TRT)

Yeşilyurt is a village in the Dinar District, Afyonkarahisar Province, Turkey. Its population is 41 (2021).
