= Dereköy, Kemah =

Village in Turkey

Dereköy
- Village
- Location in Turkey
- Coordinates: 39.572°N 39.240°E
- Country: Turkey
- Province: Erzincan
- District: Kemah
- Population (2022): 45
- Time zone: UTC+3 (TRT)

Dereköy (Kurdish: Dere Soran) is a village in the Kemah District of Erzincan Province in Turkey. The village is populated by Kurds and had a population of 45 in 2022.

The hamlet of Yuvacık is attached to the village.
