= Harmancık =

- District and municipality
- Map showing Harmancık District in Bursa Province

- Location in Turkey Harmancık (Marmara)
- Coordinates: 39°40′34″N 29°09′19″E
- Country: Turkey
- Province: Bursa

Government
  - Mayor: Haşim Ali Arıkan (CHP)
- Area: 400 km^{2} (150 sq mi)
- Population (2022): 5,979
  - Density: 15/km^{2} (39/sq mi)
- Time zone: UTC+3 (TRT)
- Area code: 0224
- Website: www.harmancik.bel.tr

Harmancık is a municipality and district of Bursa Province, Turkey. Its area is 400 km^{2}, and its population is 5,979 (2022).

== Composition ==
There are 31 neighbourhoods in Harmancık District:

- Akpınar
- Alutça
- Balatdanişment
- Ballısaray
- Bekdemirler
- Çakmak
- Çamoğlu
- Çatalsöğüt
- Dedebalı
- Delicegüney
- Dutluca
- Ece
- Gedikören
- Gökçeler
- Gülözü
- Harmancıkakalan
- Hobandanişment
- Ilıcaksu
- İshaklar
- Karaca
- Kepekdere
- Kıçmanlar
- Kılavuzlar
- Kocapınar
- Kozluca
- Merkez
- Nalbant
- Okçular
- Saçaklı
- Yayabaşı
- Yeşilyurt
