= Küplü, Kemah =

Village in Turkey

Küplü
- Village
- Location in Turkey
- Coordinates: 39.632°N 39.363°E
- Country: Turkey
- Province: Erzincan
- District: Kemah
- Population (2022): 71
- Time zone: UTC+3 (TRT)

Küplü (Kurdish: Komîk) is a village in the Kemah District of Erzincan Province in Turkey. The village is populated by Kurds and had a population of 71 in 2022.
