= Çamkonak, Daday =

Village in Turkey

Çamkonak
- Village
- Location in Turkey
- Coordinates: 41°23′53″N 33°14′01″E
- Country: Turkey
- Province: Kastamonu
- District: Daday
- Population (2021): 101
- Time zone: UTC+3 (TRT)

Çamkonak is a village in the Daday District of Kastamonu Province in Turkey. Its population was 101 in 2021.
