= Mermerli, Kemah =

Village in Turkey

Mermerli
- Village
- Location in Turkey
- Coordinates: 39°35′N 39°06′E
- Country: Turkey
- Province: Erzincan
- District: Kemah
- Population (2022): 209
- Time zone: UTC+3 (TRT)

Mermerli (Kurdish: Herdîf) is a village in the Kemah District of Erzincan Province in Turkey. The village is populated by Kurds of the Tahsuran tribe and had a population of 209 in 2022.
