= Ağaçsaray, Kemah =

Village in Turkey

Ağaçsaray
- Village
- Location in Turkey
- Coordinates: 39°43′51″N 38°56′21″E
- Country: Turkey
- Province: Erzincan
- District: Kemah
- Population (2022): 65
- Time zone: UTC+3 (TRT)

Ağaçsaray is a village in the Kemah District of Erzincan Province in Turkey. Its population is 65 (2022).
