= Yüksel, Dinar =

Yüksel
- Village
- Location within Turkey Location within Turkey Aegean
- Coordinates: 38.1308°N 30.0580°E
- Country: Turkey
- Province: Afyonkarahisar
- District: Dinar
- Population (2021): 155
- Time zone: UTC+3 (TRT)

Yüksel is a village in the Dinar District, Afyonkarahisar Province, Turkey. Its population is 155 (2021).
