= Kazankaya, Kemah =

Village in Turkey

Kazankaya
- Village
- Location in Turkey
- Coordinates: 39.639°N 39.406°E
- Country: Turkey
- Province: Erzincan
- District: Kemah
- Population (2022): 29
- Time zone: UTC+3 (TRT)

Kazankaya (Kurdish: Îranos) is a village in the Kemah District of Erzincan Province in Turkey. The village is populated by Kurds and had a population of 29 in 2022.
