= Çayözü, Daday =

Village in Turkey

Çayözü
- Village
- Location in Turkey
- Coordinates: 41°35′55″N 33°30′52″E
- Country: Turkey
- Province: Kastamonu
- District: Daday
- Population (2021): 66
- Time zone: UTC+3 (TRT)

Çayözü is a village in the Daday District of Kastamonu Province in Turkey. Its population was 66 in 2021.
