= Büyükyenice, Osmaneli =

Büyükyenice
- Village
- Location within Turkey Location within Marmara
- Coordinates: 40.3610°N 30.0567°E
- Country: Turkey
- Province: Bilecik
- District: Osmaneli
- Population (2021): 118
- Time zone: UTC+3 (TRT)

Büyükyenice is a village in the Osmaneli District, Bilecik Province, Turkey. Its population is 118 (2021).
