= Akçin, Dinar =

Akçin
- Village
- Location within Turkey Location within Turkey Aegean
- Coordinates: 38.2564°N 30.5469°E
- Country: Turkey
- Province: Afyonkarahisar
- District: Dinar
- Population (2021): 46
- Time zone: UTC+3 (TRT)

Akçin is a village in the Dinar District, Afyonkarahisar Province, Turkey. Its population is 46 (2021).
