= Dikici, Dinar =

Dikici
- Village
- Location within Turkey Location within Turkey Aegean
- Coordinates: 38°01′N 30°11′E
- Country: Turkey
- Province: Afyonkarahisar
- District: Dinar
- Population (2021): 927
- Time zone: UTC+3 (TRT)

Dikici is a village in the Dinar District, Afyonkarahisar Province, Turkey. Its population is 927 (2021).
