= Dombay, Dinar =

Dombay
- Village
- Location within Turkey Location within Turkey Aegean
- Coordinates: 38.1542°N 30.2088°E
- Country: Turkey
- Province: Afyonkarahisar
- District: Dinar
- Population (2021): 93
- Time zone: UTC+3 (TRT)

Dombay is a village in the Dinar District, Afyonkarahisar Province, Turkey. Its population is 93 (2021).
