= Cumaalanı, Çameli =

Village in Turkey

Cumaalanı
- Neighbourhood
- Location in Turkey Cumaalanı (Turkey Aegean)
- Coordinates: 37°10′N 29°23′E
- Country: Turkey
- Province: Denizli
- District: Çameli
- Population (2022): 643
- Time zone: UTC+3 (TRT)

Cumaalanı is a neighbourhood in the municipality and district of Çameli, Denizli Province in Turkey. Its population is 643 (2022).
