= Alparslan, Dinar =

Alparslan
- Village
- Location within Turkey Location within Turkey Aegean
- Country: Turkey
- Province: Afyonkarahisar
- District: Dinar
- Population (2021): 353
- Time zone: UTC+3 (TRT)

Alparslan is a village in the Dinar District, Afyonkarahisar Province, Turkey. Its population is 353 (2021).
