= Çamlıca =

Çamlıca is a Turkish place name and may refer to:

== Populated places ==
- Çamlıca, Adıyaman, a village in the central district
- Çamlıca, Alanya, a village in Alanya district of Antalya Province
- Çamlıca, Antalya, a village in the central district of Antalya Province
- Çamlıca, Aziziye
- Çamlıca, Besni, a village in Adıyaman Province
- Çamlıca, Ezine
- Çamlıca, Gazipaşa, a village in Gazipaşa district of Antalya Province
- Çamlıca, Göynük, a village in Bolu Province
- Çamlıca, İnebolu, a village
- Çamlıca, Istanbul, a neighborhood in the district of Üsküdar encompassing Çamlıca Hill
- Çamlıca, Kaynaşlı
- Çamlıca, Keşan, a municipality in Edirne Province
- Çamlıca, Kozluk, a village in Batman Province
- Çamlıca, Laçin
- Çamlıca, Merzifon, a village in Amasya Province
- Çamlıca, Mustafakemalpaşa
- Çamlıca, Mut, a village in Mut district of Mersin Province
- Çamlıca, Pasinler
- Çamlıca, Silifke, a village in Silifke district of Mersin Province
- Çamlıca, Şavşat, a village in Şavşat district of Artvin Province
- Çamlıca, Üzümlü
- Çamlıca, Vezirköprü, a village in Samsun Province
- Çamlıca, Yahyalı, a village in Kayseri Province
- Çamlıca, Yüreğir, a village in Adana Province
- Çamlıca, Yusufeli, a village in Yusufeli district of Artvin Province
- "Çamlıca", the Turkish name for Goufes, a village in northern Cyprus

== Other places ==
- Çamlıca Hill, one of the seven hills of Istanbul
- Çamlıca Republic Mosque, built in Istanbul in 2016
