= Ciciler, Osmaneli =

Ciciler
- Village
- Location within Turkey Location within Marmara
- Coordinates: 40°27′N 30°04′E
- Country: Turkey
- Province: Bilecik
- District: Osmaneli
- Population (2021): 173
- Time zone: UTC+3 (TRT)

Ciciler is a village in the Osmaneli District, Bilecik Province, Turkey. Its population is 173 (2021).
