= Çiçektepe, Dinar =

Çiçektepe
- Village
- Location within Turkey Location within Turkey Aegean
- Coordinates: 38.2864°N 30.5422°E
- Country: Turkey
- Province: Afyonkarahisar
- District: Dinar
- Population (2021): 1,251
- Time zone: UTC+3 (TRT)

Çiçektepe is a village in the Dinar District, Afyonkarahisar Province, Turkey. Its population is 1,251 (2021). Before the 2013 reorganisation, it was a town (belde).
