= Akçapınar, Osmaneli =

Akçapınar
- Village
- Location within Turkey Location within Marmara
- Coordinates: 40°24′21″N 29°53′38″E
- Country: Turkey
- Province: Bilecik
- District: Osmaneli
- Population (2021): 243
- Time zone: UTC+3 (TRT)

Akçapınar is a village in the Osmaneli District, Bilecik Province, Turkey. Its population is 243 (2021).
