= Bereket, Osmaneli =

Bereket
- Village
- Location within Turkey Location within Marmara
- Coordinates: 40.3996°N 29.8716°E
- Country: Turkey
- Province: Bilecik
- District: Osmaneli
- Population (2021): 87
- Time zone: UTC+3 (TRT)

Bereket is a village in the Osmaneli District, Bilecik Province, Turkey. Its population is 87 (2021).
