= Akılçalman, Daday =

Village in Turkey

Akılçalman
- Village
- Location in Turkey
- Coordinates: 41°24′28″N 33°21′01″E
- Country: Turkey
- Province: Kastamonu
- District: Daday
- Population (2021): 87
- Time zone: UTC+3 (TRT)

Akılçalman is a village in the Daday District of Kastamonu Province in Turkey. Its population was 87 in 2021.
