= Kayabaşı, Kemah =

Village in Turkey

Kayabaşı
- Village
- Location in Turkey
- Coordinates: 39.524°N 38.669°E
- Country: Turkey
- Province: Erzincan
- District: Kemah
- Population (2022): 46
- Time zone: UTC+3 (TRT)

Kayabaşı (Kurdish: Terkilo) is a village in the Kemah District of Erzincan Province in Turkey. The village is populated by Kurds of the Bezkar tribe and had a population of 46 in 2022.
