= Daday District =

District of Kastamonu Province, Turkey

- District
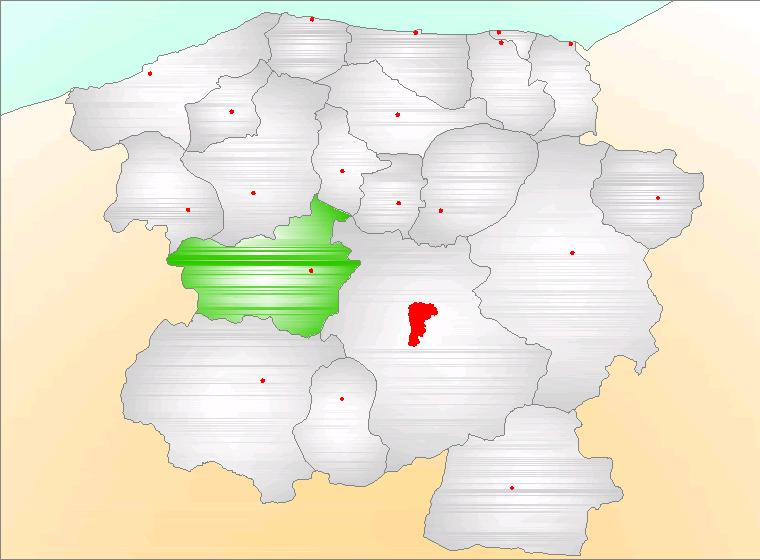
- Map showing Daday District (green) in Kastamonu Province

- Location in Turkey
- Coordinates: 41°28′N 33°28′E
- Country: Turkey
- Province: Kastamonu
- Seat: Daday

Government
  - Kaymakam: Ayşegül Yıldırım
- Area: 843 km^{2} (325 sq mi)
- Population (2021): 8,073
  - Density: 9.6/km^{2} (25/sq mi)
- Time zone: UTC+3 (TRT)
- Website: www.daday.gov.tr

Daday District is a district of the Kastamonu Province of Turkey. Its seat is the town of Daday. Its area is 843 km^{2}, and its population is 8,073 (2021).

== Composition ==
There is one municipality in Daday District:

- Daday

There are 60 villages in Daday District:

- Akılçalman
- Akpınar
- Aktaştekke
- Alipaşa
- Arabacılar
- Bağışlar
- Bastak
- Bayırköy
- Bayramlı
- Beykoz
- Bezirgan
- Bolatlar
- Boyalıca
- Boyalılar
- Budaklı
- Çamkonak
- Çamlıbel
- Çavuşlu
- Çayırlı
- Çayözü
- Çölmekçiler
- Davutköy
- Değirmencik
- Değirmenözü
- Demirce
- Dereköy
- Dereözü
- Elmayazı
- Ertaş
- Fasıllar
- Gökören
- Görük
- Hasanağa
- Hasanşeyh
- İnciğez
- Kapaklı
- Karaağaç
- Karacaağaç
- Karacaören
- Karamık
- Kavakyayla
- Kayabağı
- Kayı
- Kızılörencik
- Kızsini
- Koççuğaz
- Köşeler
- Küten
- Okluk
- Örencik
- Sarıçam
- Sarpun
- Selalmaz
- Siyahlar
- Sorkun
- Sorkuncuk
- Tüfekçi
- Uzbanlar
- Üyükören
- Yazıcameydan
