= Sofular, Çameli =

Village in Turkey

Sofular
- Neighbourhood
- Location in Turkey Sofular (Turkey Aegean)
- Coordinates: 36.9948°N 29.3325°E
- Country: Turkey
- Province: Denizli
- District: Çameli
- Population (2022): 266
- Time zone: UTC+3 (TRT)

Sofular is a neighbourhood in the municipality and district of Çameli, Denizli Province in Turkey. Its population is 266 (2022).
