= Boyalıca, Daday =

Village in Turkey

Boyalıca
- Village
- Location in Turkey
- Coordinates: 41.541°N 33.302°E
- Country: Turkey
- Province: Kastamonu
- District: Daday
- Population (2021): 57
- Time zone: UTC+3 (TRT)

Boyalıca is a village in the Daday District of Kastamonu Province in Turkey. Its population was 57 in 2021.
