= Akpınar, Daday =

Village in Turkey

Akpınar
- Village
- Location in Turkey
- Coordinates: 41.445°N 33.410°E
- Country: Turkey
- Province: Kastamonu
- District: Daday
- Population (2021): 151
- Time zone: UTC+3 (TRT)

Akpınar is a village in the Daday District of Kastamonu Province in Turkey. Its population was 151 in 2021.
