= Yağca, Kemah =

Village in Turkey

Yağca
- Village
- Location in Turkey
- Coordinates: 39.604°N 39.320°E
- Country: Turkey
- Province: Erzincan
- District: Kemah
- Population (2022): 24
- Time zone: UTC+3 (TRT)

Yağca (Kurdish: Tunixi) is a village in the Kemah District of Erzincan Province in Turkey. The village is populated by Kurds and had a population of 24 in 2022.
