= Koçkar, Kemah =

Village in Turkey

Koçkar
- Village
- Location in Turkey
- Coordinates: 39.555°N 38.921°E
- Country: Turkey
- Province: Erzincan
- District: Kemah
- Population (2022): 148
- Time zone: UTC+3 (TRT)

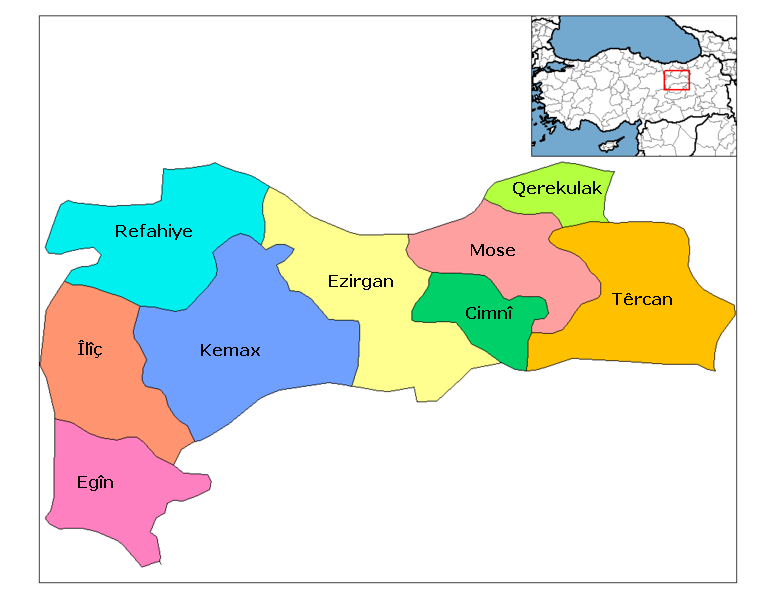

Koçkar is a village in the Kemah District of Erzincan Province in Turkey. Its population is 148 (2022).
