= Çamlıbel, Daday =

Village in Turkey

Çamlıbel
- Village
- Location in Turkey
- Coordinates: 41.400°N 33.281°E
- Country: Turkey
- Province: Kastamonu
- District: Daday
- Population (2021): 98
- Time zone: UTC+3 (TRT)

Çamlıbel is a village in the Daday District of Kastamonu Province in Turkey. Its population was 98 in 2021.
