= Ericek, Osmaneli =

Ericek
- Village
- Location within Turkey Location within Marmara
- Coordinates: 40.4294°N 29.9905°E
- Country: Turkey
- Province: Bilecik
- District: Osmaneli
- Population (2021): 208
- Time zone: UTC+3 (TRT)

Ericek is a village in the Osmaneli District, Bilecik Province, Turkey. Its population is 208 (2021).
