= Sarıyazı, Kemah =

Village in Turkey

Sarıyazı
- Village
- Location in Turkey
- Coordinates: 39.605°N 39.355°E
- Country: Turkey
- Province: Erzincan
- District: Kemah
- Population (2022): 28
- Time zone: UTC+3 (TRT)

Sarıyazı (Kurdish: Meyvali) is a village in the Kemah District of Erzincan Province in Turkey. The village is populated by Kurds of the Çarekan tribe and had a population of 28 in 2022.

The hamlet of Mağara is attached to the village.
