= Çamlıbel, Çameli =

Village in Turkey

Çamlıbel
- Neighbourhood
- Country: Turkey
- Province: Denizli
- District: Çameli
- Population (2022): 249
- Time zone: UTC+3 (TRT)

Çamlıbel is a neighbourhood in the municipality and district of Çameli, Denizli Province in Turkey. Its population is 249 (2022).
