= Yahşiler, Kemah =

Village in Turkey

Yahşiler
- Village
- Location in Turkey
- Coordinates: 39.531°N 38.710°E
- Country: Turkey
- Province: Erzincan
- District: Kemah
- Population (2022): 84
- Time zone: UTC+3 (TRT)

Yahşiler (Kurdish: Babo) is a village in the Kemah District of Erzincan Province in Turkey. The village is populated by Kurds of the Bezkar tribe and had a population 84 in 2022.

The hamlet of Balkaya (Sînîgî) is attached to the village. Balkaya is also populated by the Bezkar tribe.
