= Belevi, Çameli =

Village in Turkey

Belevi
- Neighbourhood
- Location in Turkey Belevi (Turkey Aegean)
- Coordinates: 37.0978°N 29.3755°E
- Country: Turkey
- Province: Denizli
- District: Çameli
- Population (2022): 570
- Time zone: UTC+3 (TRT)

Belevi is a neighbourhood in the municipality and district of Çameli, Denizli Province in Turkey. Its population is 570 (2022).
