= Çamlıyayla, Kemah =

Village in Turkey

Çamlıyayla
- Village
- Location in Turkey
- Coordinates: 39.7263°N 39.0113°E
- Country: Turkey
- Province: Erzincan
- District: Kemah
- Population (2022): 16
- Time zone: UTC+3 (TRT)

Çamlıyayla is a village in the Kemah District of Erzincan Province in Turkey. Its population is 16 (2022).
