= Sarıyazı, Osmaneli =

Sarıyazı
- Village
- Location within Turkey Location within Marmara
- Coordinates: 40.4539°N 29.9374°E
- Country: Turkey
- Province: Bilecik
- District: Osmaneli
- Population (2021): 94
- Time zone: UTC+3 (TRT)

Sarıyazı is a village in the Osmaneli District, Bilecik Province, Turkey. Its population is 94 (2021).
