= Özdamar, Kemah =

Village in Turkey

Özdamar
- Village
- Location in Turkey
- Coordinates: 39°44′51″N 39°02′07″E
- Country: Turkey
- Province: Erzincan
- District: Kemah
- Population (2022): 68
- Time zone: UTC+3 (TRT)

Özdamar is a village in the Kemah District of Erzincan Province in Turkey. Its population is 68 (2022).
