= Çiğdemli, Kemah =

Village in Turkey

Çiğdemli
- Village
- Location in Turkey
- Coordinates: 39°35′30″N 38°45′2″E
- Country: Turkey
- Province: Erzincan
- District: Kemah
- Population (2022): 48
- Time zone: UTC+3 (TRT)

Çiğdemli is a village in the Kemah District of Erzincan Province in Turkey. Its population is 48 (2022).
