= Yaylapınar, Çameli =

Village in Turkey

Yaylapınar
- Neighbourhood
- Country: Turkey
- Province: Denizli
- District: Çameli
- Population (2022): 623
- Time zone: UTC+3 (TRT)

Yaylapınar is a neighbourhood in the municipality and district of Çameli, Denizli Province in Turkey. Its population is 623 (2022).
