= Aktoprak, Dinar =

Aktoprak
- Village
- Location within Turkey Location within Turkey Aegean
- Country: Turkey
- Province: Afyonkarahisar
- District: Dinar
- Population (2021): 246
- Time zone: UTC+3 (TRT)

Aktoprak is a village in the Dinar District, Afyonkarahisar Province, Turkey. Its population is 246 (2021).
