= Doğanbeyli, Kemah =

Village in Turkey

Doğanbeyli
- Village
- Location in Turkey
- Coordinates: 39°41′57″N 39°2′12″E
- Country: Turkey
- Province: Erzincan
- District: Kemah
- Population (2022): 126
- Time zone: UTC+3 (TRT)

Doğanbeyli is a village in the Kemah District of Erzincan Province in Turkey. Its population is 126 (2022).
