= Akgün, Dinar =

Akgün
- Village
- Location within Turkey Location within Turkey Aegean
- Coordinates: 38.1138°N 30.2234°E
- Country: Turkey
- Province: Afyonkarahisar
- District: Dinar
- Population (2021): 443
- Time zone: UTC+3 (TRT)

Akgün is a village in the Dinar District, Afyonkarahisar Province, Turkey. Its population is 443 (2021).
