= Akpınar, Çameli =

Village in Turkey

Akpınar
- Neighbourhood
- Location in Turkey Akpınar (Turkey Aegean)
- Coordinates: 37.0059°N 29.1401°E
- Country: Turkey
- Province: Denizli
- District: Çameli
- Population (2022): 429
- Time zone: UTC+3 (TRT)

Akpınar is a neighbourhood in the municipality and district of Çameli, Denizli Province in Turkey. Its population is 429 (2022).
