= Avdan, Osmaneli =

Avdan
- Village
- Location within Turkey Location within Marmara
- Coordinates: 40.3678°N 29.8286°E
- Country: Turkey
- Province: Bilecik
- District: Osmaneli
- Population (2021): 116
- Time zone: UTC+3 (TRT)

Avdan is a village in the Osmaneli District, Bilecik Province, Turkey. Its population is 116 (2021).

== History ==
The village has had the same name since 1928.

== Geography ==
The village is 54 km away from Bilecik city center and 20 km away from Osmaneli district center.
