= Dutlu, Kemah =

Village in Turkey

Dutlu
- Village
- Location in Turkey
- Coordinates: 39°40′55″N 39°1′12″E
- Country: Turkey
- Province: Erzincan
- District: Kemah
- Population (2022): 10
- Time zone: UTC+3 (TRT)

Dutlu is a village in the Kemah District of Erzincan Province in Turkey. Its population is 10 (2022).
