= Çürüklü, Dinar =

Çürüklü
- Village
- Location within Turkey Location within Turkey Aegean
- Coordinates: 38.1912°N 30.3327°E
- Country: Turkey
- Province: Afyonkarahisar
- District: Dinar
- Population (2021): 78
- Time zone: UTC+3 (TRT)

Çürüklü is a village in the Dinar District, Afyonkarahisar Province, Turkey. Its population is 78 (2021).
