= Çamlıdere =

Çamlıdere (literally "pine creek") is a Turkish place name and may refer to:

- Çamlıdere, Ağlasun
- Çamlıdere, Ankara, a town and district of Ankara Province, Turkey
  - Çamlıdere Şekerspor, a sports club from the district
- Çamlıdere, Bozdoğan, a village in Bozdoğan district of Aydın Province, Turkey
- Çamlıdere, Mersin, a village in Toroslar district of Mersin Province, Turkey
- Çamlıdere Dam, a dam in Turkey
