= Çamlı, Dinar =

Çamlı
- Village
- Location within Turkey Location within Turkey Aegean
- Coordinates: 37.9562°N 30.1334°E
- Country: Turkey
- Province: Afyonkarahisar
- District: Dinar
- Population (2021): 37
- Time zone: UTC+3 (TRT)

Çamlı is a village in the Dinar District, Afyonkarahisar Province, Turkey. Its population is 37 (2021).
