= Yakaköy, Dinar =

Yakaköy
- Village
- Location within Turkey Location within Turkey Aegean
- Coordinates: 38.1071°N 30.1248°E
- Country: Turkey
- Province: Afyonkarahisar
- District: Dinar
- Population (2021): 83
- Time zone: UTC+3 (TRT)

Yakaköy (also: Yaka) is a village in the Dinar District, Afyonkarahisar Province, Turkey. Its population is 83 (2021).
