= Çamlıca, Alanya =

Çamlıca
- Neighbourhood
- Location in Turkey
- Coordinates: 36.4295°N 32.2900°E
- Country: Turkey
- Province: Antalya
- District: Alanya
- Population (2022): 1,224
- Time zone: UTC+3 (TRT)

Çamlıca is a neighbourhood in the municipality and district of Alanya, Antalya Province, Turkey. Its population is 1,224 (2022).
