= Gökkaya, Kemah =

Village in Turkey

Gökkaya
- Village
- Location in Turkey
- Coordinates: 39.662°N 39.219°E
- Country: Turkey
- Province: Erzincan
- District: Kemah
- Population (2022): 91
- Time zone: UTC+3 (TRT)

Gökkaya (Kurdish: Karni) is a village in the Kemah District of Erzincan Province in Turkey. The village is populated by Kurds of the Aslanan tribe and had a population of 91 in 2022.
