= Sofular, Tovuz =

Village and municipality in Tovuz Rayon, Azerbaijan

Coordinates: 40°47′N 45°37′E

Sofular is a village and municipality in the Tovuz Rayon of Azerbaijan. It has a population of 443.
