= Davutköy, Daday =

Village in Turkey

Davutköy
- Village
- Location in Turkey
- Coordinates: 41.48°N 33.49°E
- Country: Turkey
- Province: Kastamonu
- District: Daday
- Population (2021): 93
- Time zone: UTC+3 (TRT)

Davutköy is a village in the Daday District of Kastamonu Province in Turkey. Its population was 93 in 2021.
