= Yapağılı, Dinar =

Yapağılı
- Village
- Location within Turkey Location within Turkey Aegean
- Coordinates: 38°7′N 30°2′E
- Country: Turkey
- Province: Afyonkarahisar
- District: Dinar
- Population (2021): 141
- Time zone: UTC+3 (TRT)

Yapağılı is a village in the Dinar District, Afyonkarahisar Province, Turkey. Its population is 141 (2021).
