= Akpınar, Harmancık =

Village in Turkey

Akpınar
- Neighbourhood
- Location in Turkey Akpınar (Marmara)
- Coordinates: 39.6306°N 29.1222°E
- Country: Turkey
- Province: Bursa
- District: Harmancık
- Population (2022): 72
- Time zone: UTC+3 (TRT)

Akpınar is a neighbourhood in the municipality and district of Harmancık, Bursa Province in Turkey. Its population is 72 (2022).
