= Bekdemirler, Harmancık =

Village in Turkey

Bekdemirler
- Neighbourhood
- Location in Turkey Bekdemirler (Marmara)
- Coordinates: 39.6557°N 29.1596°E
- Country: Turkey
- Province: Bursa
- District: Harmancık
- Population (2022): 131
- Time zone: UTC+3 (TRT)

Bekdemirler is a neighbourhood in the municipality and district of Harmancık, Bursa Province in Turkey. Its population is 131 (2022).
