= Ayvacık, Çameli =

Village in Turkey

Ayvacık
- Neighbourhood
- Location in Turkey Ayvacık (Turkey Aegean)
- Coordinates: 37.0593°N 29.4190°E
- Country: Turkey
- Province: Denizli
- District: Çameli
- Population (2022): 78
- Time zone: UTC+3 (TRT)

Ayvacık is a neighbourhood in the municipality and district of Çameli, Denizli Province in Turkey. Its population is 78 (2022).
