= Yastıktepe, Kemah =

Village in Turkey

Yastıktepe
- Village
- Location in Turkey
- Coordinates: 39.665°N 39.265°E
- Country: Turkey
- Province: Erzincan
- District: Kemah
- Population (2022): 54
- Time zone: UTC+3 (TRT)

Yastıktepe (Kurdish: Perçenç) is a village in the Kemah District of Erzincan Province in Turkey. The village is populated by Kurds of the Tahsuran tribe and had a population of 54 in 2022.

The hamlet of Kızılyazı is attached to the village.
