= Alacaatlı, Dinar =

Alacaatlı
- Village
- Location within Turkey Location within Turkey Aegean
- Coordinates: 38.1034°N 30.2100°E
- Country: Turkey
- Province: Afyonkarahisar
- District: Dinar
- Population (2021): 30
- Time zone: UTC+3 (TRT)

Alacaatlı (also: Alacatlı) is a village in the Dinar District, Afyonkarahisar Province, Turkey. Its population is 30 (2021).
