= Soğucakpınar, Osmaneli =

Soğucakpınar
- Village
- Location within Turkey Location within Marmara
- Coordinates: 40°20′N 30°11′E
- Country: Turkey
- Province: Bilecik
- District: Osmaneli
- Population (2021): 388
- Time zone: UTC+3 (TRT)

Soğucakpınar is a village in the Osmaneli District, Bilecik Province, Turkey. Its population is 388 (2021).
