= Akpınarlı, Dinar =

Akpınarlı
- Village
- Location within Turkey Location within Turkey Aegean
- Coordinates: 38°13′N 30°20′E
- Country: Turkey
- Province: Afyonkarahisar
- District: Dinar
- Population (2021): 168
- Time zone: UTC+3 (TRT)

Akpınarlı is a village in the Dinar District, Afyonkarahisar Province, Turkey. Its population is 168 (2021).

== History ==
The former name of the village was Horu.
