= Daday =

- Municipality
- Location within Turkey
- Coordinates: 41°28′36″N 33°27′52″E
- Country: Turkey
- Province: Kastamonu
- District: Daday

Government
  - Mayor: Selahattin Yanık (CHP)
- Elevation: 886 m (2,907 ft)
- Population (2021): 2,825
- Time zone: UTC+3 (TRT)
- Area code: 0366
- Climate: Cfb
- Website: www.daday.bel.tr

Daday is a town in the Kastamonu Province in the Black Sea region of Turkey. It is located at 30 km west of Kastamonu. It is the seat of Daday District. Its population is 2,825 (2021). The town lies at an elevation of 886 m (2,907 ft). The terrain is mainly mountainous and covered with pine trees. The town is located in a valley on a small river.

== History ==
In the late 19th and early 20th century, Daday was part of the Kastamonu Vilayet of the Ottoman Empire.
