= Arıkaya, Çameli =

Village in Turkey

Arıkaya
- Neighbourhood
- Location in Turkey Arıkaya (Turkey Aegean)
- Coordinates: 36.9708°N 29.3571°E
- Country: Turkey
- Province: Denizli
- District: Çameli
- Population (2022): 592
- Time zone: UTC+3 (TRT)

Arıkaya is a neighbourhood in the municipality and district of Çameli, Denizli Province in Turkey. Its population is 592 (2022).
