= List of populated places in Bilecik Province =

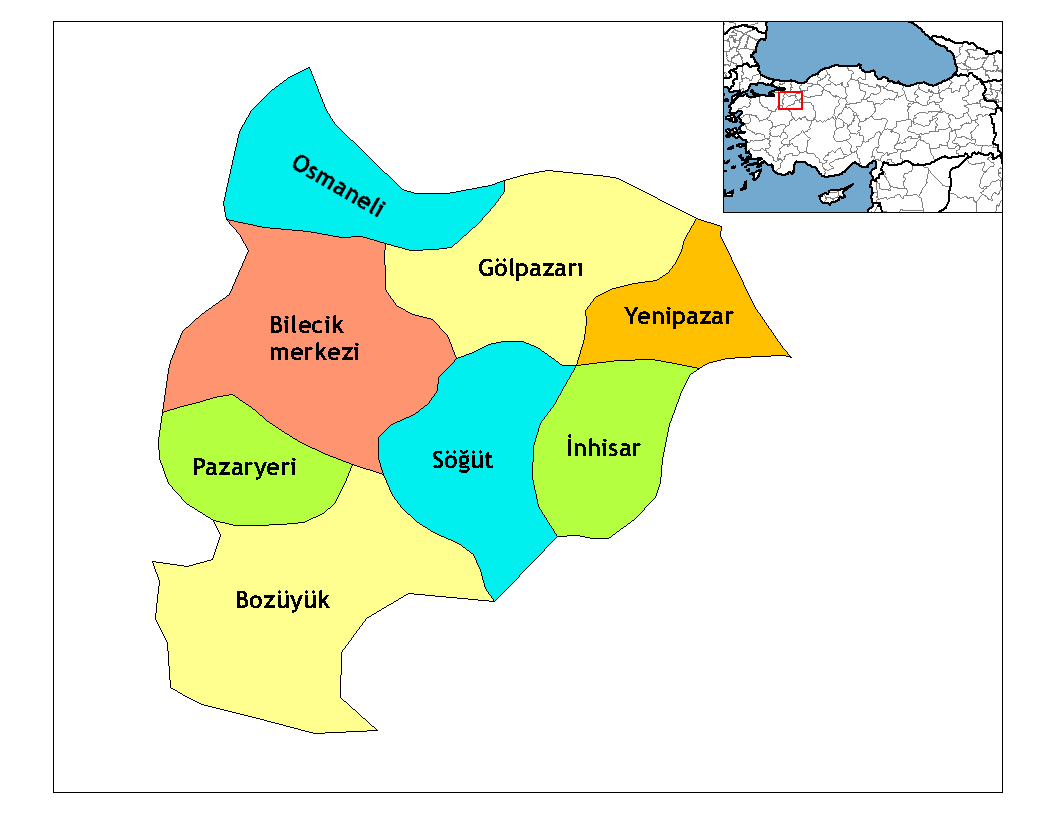
Bilecik Province

Below is the list of populated places in Bilecik Province, Turkey by the districts. In the following lists first place in each list is the administrative center of the district.

== Bilecik ==
- Bilecik
- Abadiye, Bilecik
- Abbaslık, Bilecik
- Ahmetpınar, Bilecik
- Alpağut, Bilecik
- Aşağıköy, Bilecik
- Ayvacık, Bilecik
- Bahçecik, Bilecik
- Başköy, Bilecik
- Bayırköy, Bilecik
- Bekdemir, Bilecik
- Beyce, Bilecik
- Cumalı, Bilecik
- Çakırpınar, Bilecik
- Çamkoru, Bilecik
- Çavuşköy, Bilecik
- Çukurören, Bilecik
- Deresakarı, Bilecik
- Dereşemsettin, Bilecik
- Elmabahçe, Bilecik
- Erkoca, Bilecik
- Gökpınar, Bilecik
- Hasandere, Bilecik
- İkizce, Bilecik
- İlyasbey, Bilecik
- İlyasça, Bilecik
- Kapaklı, Bilecik
- Karaağaç, Bilecik
- Kavaklı, Bilecik
- Kendirli, Bilecik
- Kepirler, Bilecik
- Kınık, Bilecik
- Kızıldamlar, Bilecik
- Koyunköy, Bilecik
- Kurtköy, Bilecik
- Kuyubaşı, Bilecik
- Künceğiz, Bilecik
- Küplü, Bilecik
- Necmiyeköy, Bilecik
- Okluca, Bilecik
- Ören, Bilecik
- Pelitözü, Bilecik
- Sarmaşık, Bilecik
- Selbükü, Bilecik
- Selöz, Bilecik
- Sütlük, Bilecik
- Şükraniye, Bilecik
- Taşçılar, Bilecik
- Ulupınar, Bilecik
- Vezirhan, Bilecik
- Yeniköy, Bilecik

== Bozüyük ==
- Bozüyük
- Akçapınar, Bozüyük
- Akpınar, Bozüyük
- Aksutekke, Bozüyük
- Alibeydüzü, Bozüyük
- Aşağıarmutlu, Bozüyük
- Bozalan, Bozüyük
- Camiliyayla, Bozüyük
- Cihangazi, Bozüyük
- Çamyayla, Bozüyük
- Çaydere, Bozüyük
- Çokçapınar, Bozüyük
- Darıdere, Bozüyük
- Delielmacık, Bozüyük
- Dodurga, Bozüyük
- Dombayçayırı, Bozüyük
- Dübekli, Bozüyük
- Düzağaç, Bozüyük
- Düzdağ, Bozüyük
- Eceköy, Bozüyük
- Erikli, Bozüyük
- Gökçeli, Bozüyük
- Göynücek, Bozüyük
- Günyarık, Bozüyük
- Hamidiye, Bozüyük
- Kandilli, Bozüyük
- Kapanalan, Bozüyük
- Karaağaç, Bozüyük
- Karabayır, Bozüyük
- Karaçayır, Bozüyük
- Ketenlik, Bozüyük
- Kızılcapınar, Bozüyük
- Kızıltepe, Bozüyük
- Kovalıca, Bozüyük
- Kozpınar, Bozüyük
- Kuyupınar, Bozüyük
- Metristepe, Bozüyük
- Muratdere, Bozüyük
- Ormangüzle, Bozüyük
- Osmaniye, Bozüyük
- Poyra, Bozüyük
- Revnak, Bozüyük
- Saraycık, Bozüyük
- Yeniçepni, Bozüyük
- Yenidodurga, Bozüyük
- Yeniüreğil, Bozüyük
- Yeşilçukurca, Bozüyük

== Gölpazarı ==
- Gölpazarı
- Akçakavak, Gölpazarı
- Aktaş, Gölpazarı
- Alıç, Gölpazarı
- Arıcaklar, Gölpazarı
- Armutçuk, Gölpazarı
- Baltalı, Gölpazarı
- Bayat, Gölpazarı
- Bolatlı, Gölpazarı
- Büyükbelen, Gölpazarı
- Büyüksusuz, Gölpazarı
- Büyüksürmeli, Gölpazarı
- Çengeller, Gölpazarı
- Çımışkı, Gölpazarı
- Çiftlik, Gölpazarı
- Çukurören, Gölpazarı
- Demirhanlar, Gölpazarı
- Derecikören, Gölpazarı
- Dereli, Gölpazarı
- Doğancılar, Gölpazarı
- Dokuz, Gölpazarı
- Gökçeler, Gölpazarı
- Gökçeözü, Gölpazarı
- Göldağı, Gölpazarı
- Gözaçanlar, Gölpazarı
- Hacıköy, Gölpazarı
- Hamidiye, Gölpazarı
- İncirli, Gölpazarı
- Karaağaç, Gölpazarı
- Karaahmetler, Gölpazarı
- Karacalar, Gölpazarı
- Kasımlar, Gölpazarı
- Kavak, Gölpazarı
- Keskin, Gölpazarı
- Köprücek, Gölpazarı
- Kurşunlu, Gölpazarı
- Kuşçuören, Gölpazarı
- Küçüksusuz, Gölpazarı
- Küçükyenice, Gölpazarı
- Kümbet, Gölpazarı
- Sarıhacılar, Gölpazarı
- Softalar, Gölpazarı
- Söğütcük, Gölpazarı
- Şahinler, Gölpazarı
- Taşçıahiler, Gölpazarı
- Tongurlar, Gölpazarı
- Türkmen, Gölpazarı
- Üyük, Gölpazarı
- Üzümlü, Gölpazarı

== İnhisar ==
- İnhisar
- Akköy, İnhisar
- Çayköy, İnhisar
- Harmanköy, İnhisar
- Hisarcık, İnhisar
- Koyunlu, İnhisar
- Muratça, İnhisar
- Samrı, İnhisar
- Tarpak, İnhisar
- Tozman, İnhisar

== Osmaneli ==
- Osmaneli
- Adliye, Osmaneli
- Ağlan, Osmaneli
- Akçapınar, Osmaneli
- Avdan, Osmaneli
- Balçıkhisar, Osmaneli
- Belenalan, Osmaneli
- Bereket, Osmaneli
- Borcak, Osmaneli
- Boyunkaya, Osmaneli
- Büyükyenice, Osmaneli
- Ciciler, Osmaneli
- Çerkeşli, Osmaneli
- Çiftlik, Osmaneli
- Dereyörük, Osmaneli
- Düzmeşe, Osmaneli
- Ericek, Osmaneli
- Günüören, Osmaneli
- Hisarcık, Osmaneli
- Kazancı, Osmaneli
- Kızılöz, Osmaneli
- Medetli, Osmaneli
- Oğulpaşa, Osmaneli
- Orhaniye, Osmaneli
- Sarıyazı, Osmaneli
- Selçik, Osmaneli
- Selimiye, Osmaneli
- Soğucakpınar, Osmaneli

== Pazaryeri ==
- Pazaryeri
- Ahmetler, Pazaryeri
- Alınca, Pazaryeri
- Arapdede, Pazaryeri
- Arpadere, Pazaryeri
- Bahçesultan, Pazaryeri
- Bozcaarmut, Pazaryeri
- Bulduk, Pazaryeri
- Burçalık, Pazaryeri
- Büyükelmalı, Pazaryeri
- Demirköy, Pazaryeri
- Dereköy, Pazaryeri
- Dülgeroğlu, Pazaryeri
- Esemen, Pazaryeri
- Fıranlar, Pazaryeri
- Güde, Pazaryeri
- Gümüşdere, Pazaryeri
- Günyurdu, Pazaryeri
- Karadede, Pazaryeri
- Karaköy, Pazaryeri
- Kınık, Pazaryeri
- Küçükelmalı, Pazaryeri
- Nazifpaşa, Pazaryeri
- Sarıdayı, Pazaryeri
- Sarnıç, Pazaryeri

== Söğüt ==
- Söğüt
- Akçasu, Söğüt
- Borcak, Söğüt
- Çaltı, Söğüt
- Dereboyu, Söğüt
- Dömez, Söğüt
- Dudaş, Söğüt*Geçitli, Söğüt
- Gündüzbey, Söğüt
- Hamitabat, Söğüt
- Hayriye, Söğüt
- Kayabalı, Söğüt
- Kepen, Söğüt
- Kızılsaray, Söğüt
- Küre, Söğüt
- Oluklu, Söğüt
- Ortaca, Söğüt
- Rızapaşa, Söğüt
- Savcıbey, Söğüt
- Sırhoca, Söğüt
- Tuzaklı, Söğüt
- Yakacık, Söğüt
- Yeşilyurt, Söğüt
- Zemzemiye, Söğüt

== Yenipazar ==
- Yenipazar
- Aşağıboğaz, Yenipazar
- Aşağıçaylı, Yenipazar
- Batıbelenören, Yenipazar
- Belkese, Yenipazar
- Caferler, Yenipazar
- Danişment, Yenipazar
- Dereköy, Yenipazar, Bilecik
- Doğubelenören, Yenipazar
- Esenköy, Yenipazar
- Karahasanlar, Yenipazar
- Katran, Yenipazar
- Kavacık, Yenipazar
- Kösüre, Yenipazar
- Kuşça, Yenipazar
- Kükürt, Yenipazar
- Nasuhlar, Yenipazar
- Selim, Yenipazar
- Sorguncukahiler, Yenipazar
- Tohumlar, Yenipazar
- Ulucak, Yenipazar
- Yukarıboğaz, Yenipazar
- Yukarıçaylı, Yenipazar
- Yumaklı, Yenipazar
