= Yenipazar District, Bilecik =

District of Bilecik Province, Turkey

Yenipazar District
- District
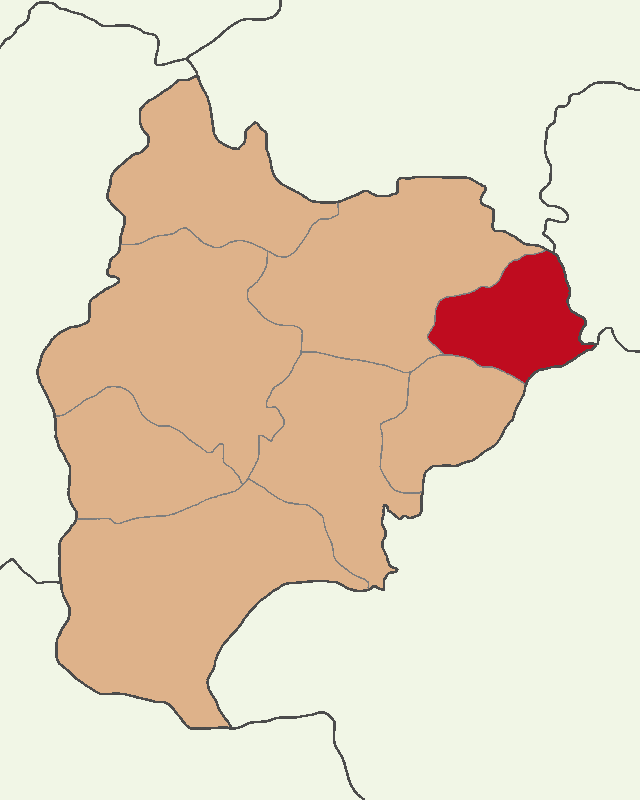
- Map showing Yenipazar District in Bilecik Province

- Location in Turkey Yenipazar District (Marmara)
- Coordinates: 40°10′N 30°31′E
- Country: Turkey
- Province: Bilecik
- Seat: Yenipazar

Government
  - Kaymakam: Rümeysa Sena Kürt
- Area: 273 km^{2} (105 sq mi)
- Population (2021): 2,787
  - Density: 10/km^{2} (26/sq mi)
- Time zone: UTC+3 (TRT)
- Website: www.bilecikyenipazar.gov.tr

Yenipazar District is a district of Bilecik Province of Turkey. Its seat is the town Yenipazar. Its area is 273 km^{2}, and its population is 2,787 (2021). Its neighbors are Taraklı from the north, Göynük from north-east, Mihalgazi and Sarıcakaya from south-east, İnhisar from south and Gölpazarı from west.

== Composition ==
There is one municipality in Yenipazar District:

- Yenipazar

There are 23 villages in Yenipazar District:

- Aşağıboğaz
- Aşağıçaylı
- Batıbelenören
- Belkese
- Caferler
- Danişment
- Dereköy
- Doğubelenören
- Esenköy
- Karahasanlar
- Katran
- Kavacık
- Kösüre
- Kükürt
- Kuşça
- Nasuhlar
- Selim
- Sorguncukahiler
- Tohumlar
- Ulucak
- Yukarıboğaz
- Yukarıçaylı
- Yumaklı
