= Necmiyeköy, Bilecik =

Necmiyeköy
- Neighbourhood
- Location within Turkey Location within Marmara
- Country: Turkey
- Province: Bilecik
- District: Bilecik
- Population (2024): 53
- Time zone: UTC+3 (TRT)

Necmiyeköy is a neighborhood (formerly a village) in the Bilecik District, Bilecik Province, Turkey. Its population is 53 (2024). The neighborhood is bordered on the north by the Bursa Province, on the northeast by the İlyasça neighborhood, on the east by the Beyce neighborhood, on the south by the Okluca neighborhood and the Bursa Province, and on the west by the Bursa Province.

== History ==
In a locality called Bağlar northeast of the village, ceramics and carved stone from the Hellenistic period have been found. In the village itself a funerary stela with a Greek inscription from the 2nd century BC has been found. Also in the village, a carved stone possibly from the Byzantine period has been reported.

In 1915, the village, then called Necmiye, was part of the nahiye of Lefke (presentday Osmaneli). Its population at that time was 169, all Muslim.
