= Mihalgazi =

- District and municipality
- Map showing Mihalgazi District in Eskişehir Province

- Location in Turkey Mihalgazi (Turkey Central Anatolia)
- Coordinates: 40°01′N 30°34′E
- Country: Turkey
- Province: Eskişehir

Government
  - Mayor: Zeynep Akgün (AKP)
- Area: 109 km^{2} (42 sq mi)
- Elevation: 210 m (690 ft)
- Population (2022): 2,987
  - Density: 27.4/km^{2} (71.0/sq mi)
- Time zone: UTC+3 (TRT)
- Postal code: 26880
- Area code: 0222
- Website: www.mihalgazi.bel.tr

Mihalgazi (before 1927: Gümele) is a municipality and district of Eskişehir Province, Turkey. Its area is 109 km^{2}, and its population is 2,987 (2022). The town lies at an elevation of 210 m (689 ft), on the Sakarya River, 35 km north from Eskişehir city. The district borders İnhisar to the west, Yenipazar to the northwest, Sarıcakaya to the east and Tepebaşı to the south. There are hot springs in Sakarıılıca.

Mihalgazi was part of Eskişehir sanjak between 1292 and the second half of the 15th century. It was part of Göynük township of Bursa sanjak between second half of the 15th century and the 16th century, and then of Bolu sanjak until 1894, when it was attached to the Söğüt District of Bilecik. It was part of İnhisar nahiya in Söğüt township of Bilecik sanjak between 1894 and 1923, and of Söğüt district of Bilecik Province between 1923 and 1946. It became a township and changed its name as Mihalgazi in 1927 after people of Gümele repulsed attacks of Greeks troops, who marched from Söğüt and Eskişehir during Turkish War of Independence in 1921. It became part of the Central District of Eskişehir Province in 1946 and of Sarıcakaya district in 1958. It became a municipality in 1967. It finally became a district of Eskişehir Province in 1990.

== Composition ==
There are 9 neighbourhoods in Mihalgazi District:

- Alpagut
- Bozaniç
- Cumhuriyet
- Demirciler
- Dokuz Mayıs
- Hürriyet
- İstiklal
- Karaoğlan
- Sakarıılıca
