= Harmankaya Canyon Nature Park =

Canyon in Bilecik, Turkey

- Harmankaya Kanyonu Tabiat Parkı
- Location within Turkey
- Location: Karahasanlar, Yenipazar and Harmanköy, İnhisar villages, Bilecik Province, Turkey
- Coordinates: 40°08′55″N 30°26′27″E
- Area: 260 ha (640 acres)
- Established: December 26, 2012; 13 years ago
- Governing body: Directorate-General of Nature Protection and National Parks; Ministry of Environment and Forest

Harmankaya Canyon Nature Park (Turkish: Harmankaya Kanyonu Tabiat Parkı) is a canyon in Bilecik Province, western Turkey, which was declared a nature park.

The canyon is located between Karahasanlar village in Yenipazar district and Harmanköy village in İnhisar of Bilecik. Its distance to Karahasanlar village is 7 km (4.3 mi) and to Harmanköy about 4 km (2.5 mi). The canyon's northern entrance is at an elevation of 520 m (1,710 ft), the southern entrance is at 611 m (2,005 ft) while the elevation in the canyon mid measures about 400 m (1,300 ft). It is about 3.9 km (2.4 mi) long, and its entrance is around 5 m (16 ft) wide. The canyon cliffs are 300–600 m (980–1,970 ft) high. There are two waterfalls of about 22 m (72 ft) height, and many others of 1.5–2 m (4 ft 11 in – 6 ft 7 in) height. The area covering 260 ha (640 acres) was declared as the country's 184th nature park by the Ministry of Environment and Forest on December 26, 2012.

The vegetation of the nature park consists of low trees and shrubs like oak (Quercus), juniper (Juniperus), rowan (Sorbus), terebinth (Pistacia terebinthus), willow (Salix,) and blackthorn (Prunus spinosa).
