= Mossynea =

Town of ancient Bithynia

Coordinates: 40°18′05″N 30°22′33″E

Mossynea was a town of ancient Bithynia, inhabited in Roman times. The name does not occur among ancient authors but is inferred from epigraphic and other evidence.

Its site is located near to the east of Tongurlar village, in the Gölpazarı district of Bilecik Province of Asiatic Turkey.
