= Mehmet Terzi =

Turkish long-distance runner

Personal information
- Nationality: Turkish
- Born: 5 May 1955 (age 71) Kurtköy, Bilecik Province, Turkey

Sport
- Sport: Running
- Events: Marathon, road running

Achievements and titles
- Personal bests: 2:10:25 London, 1987 marathon
Medal record
Men's athletics
Representing Turkey
Mediterranean Games
Gold medal – first place	1983 Casablanca	Marathon
Bronze medal – third place	1979 Split	Marathon
City marathons
Gold medal – first place	1987 San Francisco	Marathon
Gold medal – first place	1985 Istanbul	Marathon
Silver medal – second place	1983 Frankfurt	Marathon
Silver medal – second place	1978 Paris	Marathon

Mehmet Terzi (born 5 May 1955) is a medal-winning former long-distance runner from Turkey, who specialized in running marathons. He served as the president of the Turkish Athletic Federation (Turkish: Türkiye Atletizm Federasyonu) (TAF) for nine years between 2004 and 2013.

Terzi was born on 5 May 1955, at Kurtköy in Bilecik Province, mid-western Turkey. He competed in the 1500m, 5000m, 10000m and cross-country events in various clubs in Eskişehir, Mersin, Ankara, Bursa, Zonguldak and Istanbul after entering athletics in 1970 in Eskişehir. He was a member of Fenerbahçe SK.

Mehmet Terzi won a bronze medal at the 1979 Mediterranean Games in Split, Yugoslavia; and clinched the marathon gold medal at the 1983 Mediterranean Games in Casablanca, Morocco. He also won the Istanbul Marathon in 1985 and the San Francisco Marathon in 1987; after receiving silver medals in the 1978 Paris, France, and 1983 Frankfurt, Germany, marathons.

He competed for Turkey in marathon at the 1984 Los Angeles and 1988 Seoul Olympics, but did not achieve a top rank.

In 2004, Mehmet Terzi was elected president of the Turkish Athletic Federation for a term of four years. He was re-elected for the same post for another four-year term in 2008. He won his third consecutive election in 2012, but was forced to resign after a high-profile doping scandal in Turkish athletics during the summer of 2013. Terzi resigned from the TAF Presidency on 1 August 2013, just before the World Championships in Moscow.
