= Akçay Dam =

- Location within Turkey
- Official name: Akçay Baraji
- Country: Turkey
- Coordinates: 40°17′N 30°25′E

Dam and spillways
- Impounds: Akçay River
- Height: 55 m (180 ft)
- Dam volume: 413,000 m^{3} (540,184 cu yd)

Reservoir
- Total capacity: 9,750,000 cubic metres (344,000,000 cu ft)

Akçay Dam in Turkey impounds the Akçay River, a tributary of Sakarya River.

It is situated in Gölpazarı ilçe (district) of Bilecik Province at 40°17′N 30°25′E close to Softalar village. The height of this rockfill dam is 55 metres (180 ft) and the dam volume is 413,000 cubic metres (14,600,000 cu ft). Its storage capacity is 9,750,000 cubic metres (344,000,000 cu ft). The dam has recently been completed. After water holding phase, 10,660 decares (10.66 km^{2}; 4.12 sq mi) of agricultural land will be irrigated.
