= Ontoraita =

Ancient town

Coordinates: 40°15′52″N 30°32′15″E

Ontoraita was a town of ancient Bithynia, inhabited in Roman times. The name does not occur among ancient authors but is inferred from epigraphic and other evidence.

Its site is located near Kükürt, Bilecik Province, Asiatic Turkey.
