= Gökpınar =

Gökpınar can refer to:

- Gökpınar, Tercan
- Gökpınar Dam
- Gökpınar, Taşova
- Gökpınar, Bayburt
- Gökpınar, Bolu
- Gökpınar, Elmalı
- Gökpınar, Bilecik
- Gökpınar, Ulus
