= Akköy =

Akköy is a Turkish toponym meaning "white village" and may refer to:

- Akköy, Bismil
- Akköy, Denizli, a town and district of Denizli Province, Turkey
- Akköy, Didim, a village in Aydın Province, Turkey
- Akköy, Ezine
- Akköy, İnhisar, a village in Bilecik Province, Turkey
- Akköy, Mudanya
- Akköy, Yenice
- Akköy Dam, a dam in Kayseri Province, Turkey
