= Demirhanlar =

Demirhanlar may refer to the following places in Turkey:

- Demirhanlar, Gölpazarı, a village in the district of Gölpazarı, Bilecik Province
- Demirhanlar, Göynük, a village in the district of Göynük, Bolu Province

== See also ==
- Demirhan (disambiguation)
