= Şükraniye =

Şükraniye can refer to:

- Şükraniye, Bilecik
- Şükraniye, Kestel
