= Koyunlu =

Koyunlu may refer to the following places in Turkey:

- Koyunlu, Bismil
- Koyunlu, Gercüş
- Koyunlu, Göle
- Koyunlu, İnhisar
- Koyunlu, Niğde
