= Söğütcük =

Söğütcük may refer to:

- Söğütcük, Korkuteli
- Söğütcük, Gölpazarı
