= Hisarcık (disambiguation) =

Hisarcık is a town in Kütahya Province, Turkey.

Hisarcık may also refer to the following settlements in Turkey:

- Hisarcık, Eldivan, a village in Çankırı Province
- Hisarcık, Nazilli, a neighbourhood in Aydın Province
- Hisarcık, Osmaneli, a village in Bilecik Province
- Hisarcık, İnhisar, a village in Bilecik Province
