= Sarmaşık, Bilecik =

Sarmaşık
- Neighbourhood
- Country: Turkey
- Province: Bilecik
- District: Bilecik
- Municipality: Bayırköy
- Population (2021): 141
- Time zone: UTC+3 (TRT)

Sarmaşık is a neighbourhood of the town Bayırköy, Bilecik District, Bilecik Province, Turkey. Its population is 141 (2021).
