= Yenipazar =

Yenipazar, which means "new market place" in Turkish, is the actual or historical name of several localities. It may refer to:

== People ==
- Murat Yenipazar (born 1993), Turkish volleyball player

== Places ==
- Novi Pazar is a city, notable during the Ottoman period when it took the name, in today's Serbia
- Yenipazar, Aydın is a district and its central town in Aydın Province in western Turkey
- Yenipazar, Bilecik is a district and its central town in Bilecik Province in north-western Turkey
