= Kümbet =

Kümbet may refer to:

- A type of tomb in Anatolian Seljuk architecture
- Kümbet, Karakoçan
- Kümbet, Gölpazarı, village in Bilecik province, Turkey
- Kümbet, Ortaköy, village in Aksaray province, Turkey
- Kümbet, Seyitgazi, village in the Seyitgazi District of Eskişehir Province, Turkey
