= Selim, Yenipazar =

Selim
- Village
- Location within Turkey Location within Marmara
- Coordinates: 40.2306°N 30.5354°E
- Country: Turkey
- Province: Bilecik
- District: Yenipazar
- Population (2021): 147
- Time zone: UTC+3 (TRT)

Selim (also: Selimköy) is a village in the Yenipazar District, Bilecik Province, Turkey. Its population is 147 (2021).
