= Dereli, Gölpazarı =

Dereli
- Village
- Location within Turkey Location within Marmara
- Coordinates: 40.3054°N 30.4303°E
- Country: Turkey
- Province: Bilecik
- District: Gölpazarı
- Population (2021): 43
- Time zone: UTC+3 (TRT)

Dereli is a village in the Gölpazarı District, Bilecik Province, Turkey. Its population is 43 (2021).
