= Cumalı, Bilecik =

Cumalı
- Village
- Location within Turkey Location within Marmara
- Coordinates: 40.284°N 29.930°E
- Country: Turkey
- Province: Bilecik
- District: Bilecik
- Population (2021): 120
- Time zone: UTC+3 (TRT)

Cumalı is a village in the Bilecik District, Bilecik Province, Turkey. Its population is 120 (2021).
