= Karaağaç, Gölpazarı =

Karaağaç
- Village
- Location within Turkey Location within Marmara
- Coordinates: 40.2318°N 30.1541°E
- Country: Turkey
- Province: Bilecik
- District: Gölpazarı
- Population (2021): 72
- Time zone: UTC+3 (TRT)

Karaağaç is a village in the Gölpazarı District, Bilecik Province, Turkey. Its population is 72 (2021).
