= Sarıhacılar, Gölpazarı =

Sarıhacılar
- Village
- Location within Turkey Location within Marmara
- Coordinates: 40.2848°N 30.5176°E
- Country: Turkey
- Province: Bilecik
- District: Gölpazarı
- Population (2021): 27
- Time zone: UTC+3 (TRT)

Sarıhacılar is a village in the Gölpazarı District, Bilecik Province, Turkey. Its population is 27 (2021).
