= Büyüksusuz, Gölpazarı =

Büyüksusuz
- Village
- Location within Turkey Location within Marmara
- Coordinates: 40°17′N 30°10′E
- Country: Turkey
- Province: Bilecik
- District: Gölpazarı
- Population (2021): 70
- Time zone: UTC+3 (TRT)

Büyüksusuz is a village in the Gölpazarı District, Bilecik Province, Turkey. Its population is 70 (2021).
