= Ahmetpınar, Bilecik =

Ahmetpınar
- Village
- Location within Turkey Location within Marmara
- Coordinates: 40°03′N 30°01′E
- Country: Turkey
- Province: Bilecik
- District: Bilecik
- Population (2021): 47
- Time zone: UTC+3 (TRT)

Ahmetpınar is a village in the Bilecik District, Bilecik Province, Turkey. Its population is 47 (2021).
