= Hasandere, Bilecik =

Hasandere
- Village
- Location within Turkey Location within Marmara
- Country: Turkey
- Province: Bilecik
- District: Bilecik
- Population (2021): 37
- Time zone: UTC+3 (TRT)

Hasandere is a village in the Bilecik District, Bilecik Province, Turkey. Its population is 37 (2021).
