= Bekdemir, Bilecik =

Bekdemir
- Village
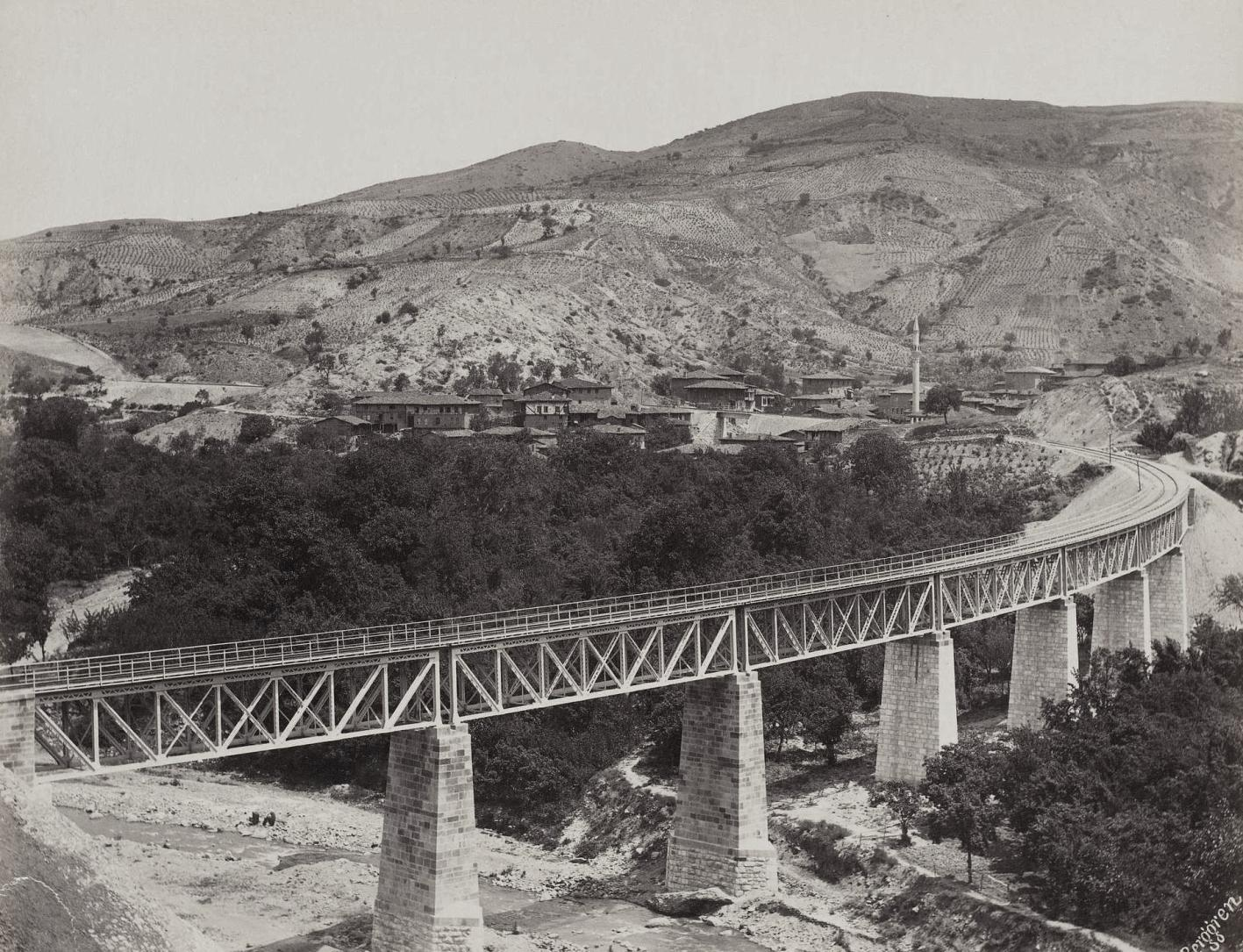
- View of a nearby railway bridge showing the village in 1894

- Location within Turkey Location within Marmara
- Coordinates: 40.08626°N 29.9916°E
- Country: Turkey
- Province: Bilecik
- District: Bilecik
- Population (2021): 71
- Time zone: UTC+3 (TRT)

Bekdemir is a village in the Bilecik District, Bilecik Province, Turkey. Its population is 71 (2021).
