= Akçakavak, Gölpazarı =

Akçakavak
- Village
- Location in Turkey Akçakavak (Marmara)
- Coordinates: 40.3268°N 30.3337°E
- Country: Turkey
- Province: Bilecik
- District: Gölpazarı
- Population (2021): 63
- Time zone: UTC+3 (TRT)

Akçakavak is a village in Gölpazarı District, Bilecik Province, Turkey. As of 2021, it had a population of 63 people.
