= Karacalar, Gölpazarı =

Karacalar
- Village
- Location within Turkey Location within Marmara
- Coordinates: 40.1896°N 30.2549°E
- Country: Turkey
- Province: Bilecik
- District: Gölpazarı
- Population (2021): 28
- Time zone: UTC+3 (TRT)

Karacalar is a village in the Gölpazarı District, Bilecik Province, Turkey. Its population is 28 (2021).
