= Gökçeler, Gölpazarı =

Gökçeler
- Village
- Location within Turkey Location within Marmara
- Coordinates: 40.1984°N 30.3034°E
- Country: Turkey
- Province: Bilecik
- District: Gölpazarı
- Population (2021): 111
- Time zone: UTC+3 (TRT)

Gökçeler is a village in the Gölpazarı District, Bilecik Province, Turkey. Its population was 111 in 2021.
