= Çengeller, Gölpazarı =

Çengeller
- Village
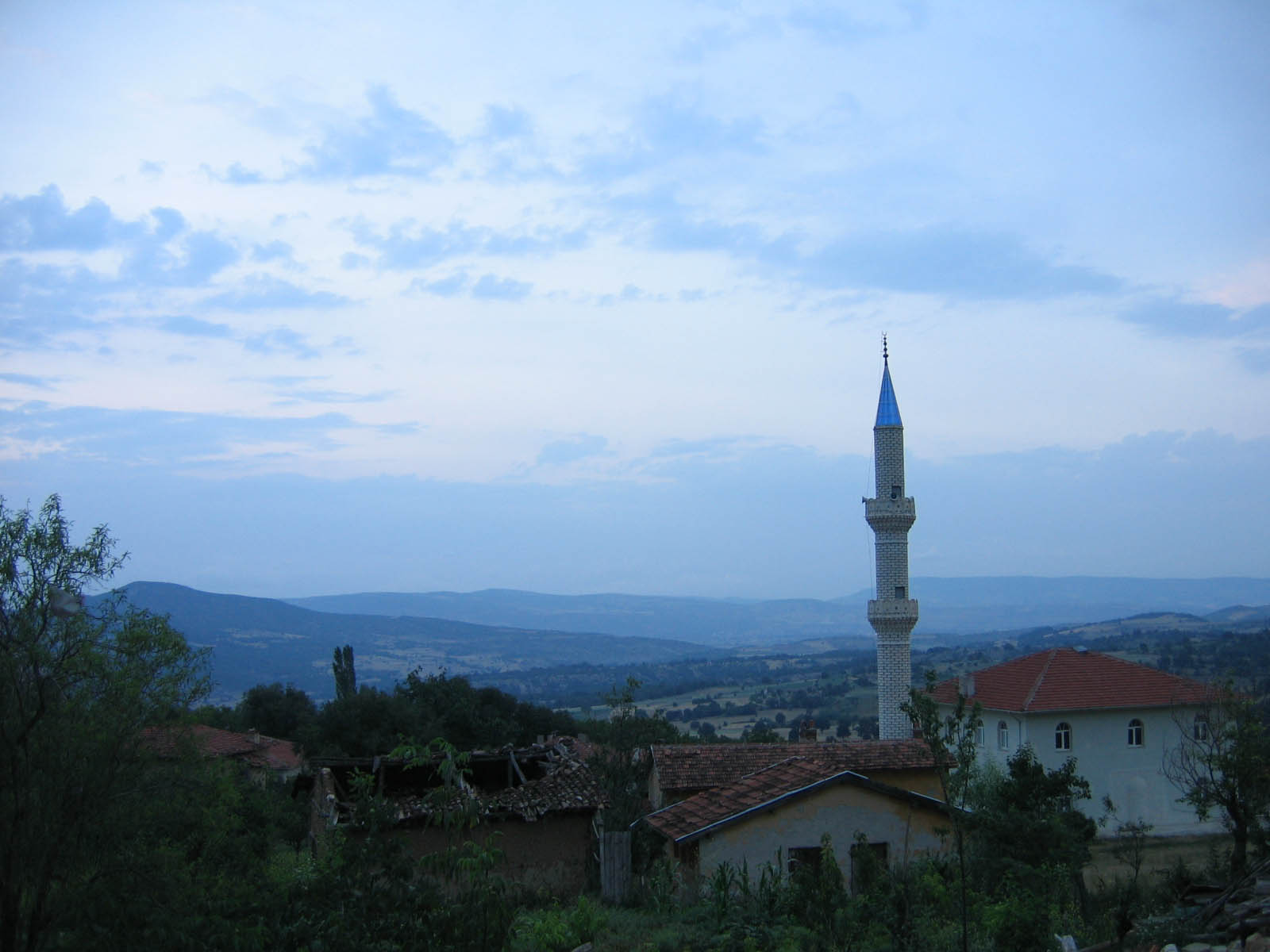

- Location within Turkey Location within Marmara
- Coordinates: 40.1894°N 30.2885°E
- Country: Turkey
- Province: Bilecik
- District: Gölpazarı
- Population (2021): 107
- Time zone: UTC+3 (TRT)

Çengeller is a village in the Gölpazarı District, Bilecik Province, Turkey. Its population is 107 (2021).
