= Tohumlar, Yenipazar =

Tohumlar
- Village
- Location within Turkey Location within Marmara
- Coordinates: 40.2116°N 30.4599°E
- Country: Turkey
- Province: Bilecik
- District: Yenipazar
- Population (2021): 32
- Time zone: UTC+3 (TRT)

Tohumlar is a village in the Yenipazar District, Bilecik Province, Turkey. Its population is 32 (2021).
