= Doğubelenören, Yenipazar =

Doğubelenören
- Village
- Location within Turkey Location within Marmara
- Coordinates: 40°14′N 30°30′E
- Country: Turkey
- Province: Bilecik
- District: Yenipazar
- Population (2021): 47
- Time zone: UTC+3 (TRT)

Doğubelenören is a village in the Yenipazar District, Bilecik Province, Turkey. Its population is 47 (2021).
