= Bolatlı, Gölpazarı =

Bolatlı
- Village
- Location within Turkey Location within Marmara
- Coordinates: 40°17′44″N 30°14′49″E
- Country: Turkey
- Province: Bilecik
- District: Gölpazarı
- Population (2021): 122
- Time zone: UTC+3 (TRT)

Bolatlı is a village in the Gölpazarı District, Bilecik Province, Turkey. Its population is 122 (2021).
