= Aktaş, Gölpazarı =

Aktaş
- Village
- Location in Turkey Aktaş (Marmara)
- Coordinates: 40.3002°N 30.2734°E
- Country: Turkey
- Province: Bilecik
- District: Gölpazarı
- Population (2021): 142
- Time zone: UTC+3 (TRT)

Aktaş is a village in the Gölpazarı District, Bilecik Province, Turkey. As of 2021, it had a population of 142 people.
