= Kendirli, Bilecik =

Kendirli
- Village
- Location within Turkey Location within Marmara
- Coordinates: 40.1497°N 29.8377°E
- Country: Turkey
- Province: Bilecik
- District: Bilecik
- Population (2021): 138
- Time zone: UTC+3 (TRT)

Kendirli is a village in the Bilecik District, Bilecik Province, Turkey. Its population is 138 (2021).
