= Koyunköy, Bilecik =

Koyunköy
- Village
- Location within Turkey Location within Marmara
- Coordinates: 40°08′N 29°45′E
- Country: Turkey
- Province: Bilecik
- District: Bilecik
- Population (2021): 180
- Time zone: UTC+3 (TRT)

Koyunköy is a village in the Bilecik District, Bilecik Province, Turkey. Its population is 180 (2021).
