= Kösüre, Yenipazar =

Kösüre
- Village
- Location within Turkey Location within Marmara
- Coordinates: 40°12′N 30°38′E
- Country: Turkey
- Province: Bilecik
- District: Yenipazar
- Population (2021): 95
- Time zone: UTC+3 (TRT)

Kösüre is a village in the Yenipazar District, Bilecik Province, Turkey. Its population is 95 (2021).
