= Karaahmetler, Gölpazarı =

Karaahmetler
- Village
- Location within Turkey Location within Marmara
- Country: Turkey
- Province: Bilecik
- District: Gölpazarı
- Population (2021): 58
- Time zone: UTC+3 (TRT)

Karaahmetler is a village in the Gölpazarı District, Bilecik Province, Turkey. Its population is 58 (2021).
