= Büyüksürmeli, Gölpazarı =

Büyüksürmeli
- Village
- Location within Turkey Location within Marmara
- Coordinates: 40°18′N 30°23′E
- Country: Turkey
- Province: Bilecik
- District: Gölpazarı
- Population (2021): 51
- Time zone: UTC+3 (TRT)

Büyüksürmeli is a village in the Gölpazarı District, Bilecik Province, Turkey. Its population is 51 (2021).
