= Sütlük, Bilecik =

Sütlük
- Village
- Location within Turkey Location within Marmara
- Coordinates: 40°07′N 29°50′E
- Country: Turkey
- Province: Bilecik
- District: Bilecik
- Population (2021): 65
- Time zone: UTC+3 (TRT)

Sütlük is a village in the Bilecik District, Bilecik Province, Turkey. Its population is 65 (2021).
