= Batıbelenören, Yenipazar =

Batıbelenören
- Village
- Location within Turkey Location within Marmara
- Coordinates: 40.2312°N 30.4834°E
- Country: Turkey
- Province: Bilecik
- District: Yenipazar
- Population (2021): 84
- Time zone: UTC+3 (TRT)

Batıbelenören is a village in the Yenipazar District, Bilecik Province, Turkey. Its population is 84 (2021).
