= Keskin, Gölpazarı =

Keskin
- Village
- Location within Turkey Location within Marmara
- Coordinates: 40.3169°N 30.3241°E
- Country: Turkey
- Province: Bilecik
- District: Gölpazarı
- Population (2021): 40
- Time zone: UTC+3 (TRT)

Keskin is a village in the Gölpazarı District, Bilecik Province, Turkey. Its population is 40 (2021).
