= Küçükyenice, Gölpazarı =

Küçükyenice
- Village
- Location within Turkey Location within Marmara
- Coordinates: 40.2266°N 30.0777°E
- Country: Turkey
- Province: Bilecik
- District: Gölpazarı
- Population (2021): 114
- Time zone: UTC+3 (TRT)

Küçükyenice is a village in the Gölpazarı District, Bilecik Province, Turkey. Its population is 114 (2021).
