= Ören, Bilecik =

Ören
- Village
- Location within Turkey Location within Marmara
- Country: Turkey
- Province: Bilecik
- District: Bilecik
- Population (2021): 66
- Time zone: UTC+3 (TRT)

Ören is a village in the Bilecik District, Bilecik Province, Turkey. Its population is 66 (2021).
