= Tarpak, İnhisar =

Tarpak
- Village
- Location within Turkey Location within Marmara
- Coordinates: 40°02′N 30°26′E
- Country: Turkey
- Province: Bilecik
- District: İnhisar
- Population (2021): 271
- Time zone: UTC+3 (TRT)

Tarpak is a village in the İnhisar District, Bilecik Province, Turkey. Its population is 271 (2021). Before the 2013 reorganisation, it was a town (belde).
