= Dereköy, Yenipazar, Bilecik =

Dereköy
- Village
- Location within Turkey Location within Marmara
- Country: Turkey
- Province: Bilecik
- District: Yenipazar
- Population (2021): 13
- Time zone: UTC+3 (TRT)

Dereköy is a village in the Yenipazar District, Bilecik Province, Turkey. Its population is 13 (2021).
