= Karahasanlar, Yenipazar =

Karahasanlar
- Village
- Location within Turkey Location within Marmara
- Coordinates: 40.1601°N 30.4372°E
- Country: Turkey
- Province: Bilecik
- District: Yenipazar
- Population (2021): 67
- Time zone: UTC+3 (TRT)

Karahasanlar is a village in the Yenipazar District, Bilecik Province, Turkey. Its population is 67 (2021).

== See also ==
- Harmankaya Canyon Nature Park
