= Gülümbe, Bilecik =

Gülümbe
- Village
- Location within Turkey Location within Marmara
- Coordinates: 40°12′N 29°58′E
- Country: Turkey
- Province: Bilecik
- District: Bilecik
- Population (2021): 580
- Time zone: UTC+3 (TRT)

Gülümbe (formerly: Çamkoru) is a village in the Bilecik District, Bilecik Province, Turkey. Its population is 580 (2021).
