= Baltalı, Gölpazarı =

Baltalı
- Village
- Location in Turkey Baltalı (Marmara)
- Coordinates: 40.2513°N 30.4399°E
- Country: Turkey
- Province: Bilecik
- District: Gölpazarı
- Population (2021): 26
- Time zone: UTC+3 (TRT)

Baltalı is a village in Gölpazarı District, Bilecik Province, Turkey. As of 2021, it had a population of 26 people.
