= Ulucak, Yenipazar =

Ulucak
- Village
- Location within Turkey Location within Marmara
- Country: Turkey
- Province: Bilecik
- District: Yenipazar
- Population (2021): 33
- Time zone: UTC+3 (TRT)

Ulucak is a village in the Yenipazar District, Bilecik Province, Turkey. Its population is 33 (2021).
