= Gökçeözü, Gölpazarı =

Gökçeözü
- Village
- Location within Turkey Location within Marmara
- Coordinates: 40.2892°N 30.5492°E
- Country: Turkey
- Province: Bilecik
- District: Gölpazarı
- Population (2021): 128
- Time zone: UTC+3 (TRT)

Gökçeözü (also: Gökçeöz) is a village in the Gölpazarı District, Bilecik Province, Turkey. Its population is 128 (2021).
