= Samrı, İnhisar =

Samrı
- Village
- Location within Turkey Location within Marmara
- Coordinates: 40.0427°N 30.3254°E
- Country: Turkey
- Province: Bilecik
- District: İnhisar
- Population (2021): 263
- Time zone: UTC+3 (TRT)

Samrı is a village in the İnhisar District, Bilecik Province, Turkey. Its population is 263 (2021).
