= Bahçecik, Bilecik =

Bahçecik
- Village
- Location within Turkey Location within Marmara
- Coordinates: 40.1287°N 29.7360°E
- Country: Turkey
- Province: Bilecik
- District: Bilecik
- Population (2021): 95
- Time zone: UTC+3 (TRT)

Bahçecik is a village in the Bilecik District, Bilecik Province, Turkey. Its population is 95 (2021).
