= Hamidiye, Gölpazarı =

Hamidiye
- Village
- Location within Turkey Location within Marmara
- Coordinates: 40.3125°N 30.2356°E
- Country: Turkey
- Province: Bilecik
- District: Gölpazarı
- Population (2021): 15
- Time zone: UTC+3 (TRT)

Hamidiye is a village in the Gölpazarı District, Bilecik Province, Turkey. Its population is 15 (2021).
