= Karaağaç, Bilecik =

Karaağaç
- Village
- Location within Turkey Location within Marmara
- Coordinates: 40°11′33″N 29°50′58″E
- Country: Turkey
- Province: Bilecik
- District: Bilecik
- Population (2021): 89
- Time zone: UTC+3 (TRT)

Karaağaç is a village in the Bilecik District, Bilecik Province, Turkey. Its population is 89 (2021).
