= Kurşunlu, Gölpazarı =

Kurşunlu
- Village
- Location within Turkey Location within Marmara
- Coordinates: 40°14′26″N 30°15′46″E
- Country: Turkey
- Province: Bilecik
- District: Gölpazarı
- Population (2021): 145
- Time zone: UTC+3 (TRT)

Kurşunlu is a village in the Gölpazarı District, Bilecik Province, Turkey. Its population is 145 (2021).
