= Türkmen, Gölpazarı =

Türkmen
- Village
- Location within Turkey Location within Marmara
- Coordinates: 40.2069°N 30.3522°E
- Country: Turkey
- Province: Bilecik
- District: Gölpazarı
- Population (2021): 97
- Time zone: UTC+3 (TRT)

Türkmen is a village in the Gölpazarı District, Bilecik Province, Turkey. Its population is 97 (2021).
