= Armutçuk, Gölpazarı =

Armutçuk
- Village
- Location in Turkey Armutçuk (Marmara)
- Coordinates: 40.2538°N 30.4598°E
- Country: Turkey
- Province: Bilecik
- District: Gölpazarı
- Population (2021): 32
- Time zone: UTC+3 (TRT)

Armutçuk is a village in Gölpazarı District, Bilecik Province, Turkey. As of 2021, it had a population of 32 people.
