= Yukarıboğaz, Yenipazar =

Yukarıboğaz
- Village
- Location within Turkey Location within Marmara
- Coordinates: 40.2435°N 30.6032°E
- Country: Turkey
- Province: Bilecik
- District: Yenipazar
- Population (2021): 123
- Time zone: UTC+3 (TRT)

Yukarıboğaz is a village in the Yenipazar District, Bilecik Province, Turkey. Its population is 123 (2021).
