= Dereşemsettin, Bilecik =

Dereşemsettin
- Village
- Location within Turkey Location within Marmara
- Coordinates: 40°09′N 29°54′E
- Country: Turkey
- Province: Bilecik
- District: Bilecik
- Population (2021): 66
- Time zone: UTC+3 (TRT)

Dereşemsettin is a village in the Bilecik District, Bilecik Province, Turkey. Its population is 66 (2021).
