= Büyükbelen, Gölpazarı =

Büyükbelen
- Village
- Location within Turkey Location within Marmara
- Coordinates: 40°10′N 30°19′E
- Country: Turkey
- Province: Bilecik
- District: Gölpazarı
- Population (2021): 141
- Time zone: UTC+3 (TRT)

Büyükbelen is a village in the Gölpazarı District, Bilecik Province, Turkey. Its population is 141 (2021).
