= Danişment, Yenipazar =

Danişment
- Village
- Location within Turkey Location within Marmara
- Coordinates: 40.1858°N 30.5776°E
- Country: Turkey
- Province: Bilecik
- District: Yenipazar
- Population (2021): 64
- Time zone: UTC+3 (TRT)

Danişment is a village in the Yenipazar District, Bilecik Province, Turkey. Its population is 64 (2021).
