= Demirhan =

Demirhan may refer to:

== People ==
- Evin Demirhan (born 1995), Turkish female sport wrestler, sister of Zehra Demirhan
- Serol Demirhan (born 1988), Turkish footballer
- Zehra Demirhan (born 2001), Turkish female sport wrestler, sister of Evin Demirhan

== Places ==
- Demirhan, Sultanhisar, a village in the district of Sultanhisar, Aydın Province, Turkey
- The Turkish name of Trachoni, Nicosia, a village in Cyprus

== See also ==
- Demirhanlar (disambiguation)
