= Doğancılar, Gölpazarı =

Doğancılar
- Village
- Location within Turkey Location within Marmara
- Coordinates: 40.2776°N 30.3980°E
- Country: Turkey
- Province: Bilecik
- District: Gölpazarı
- Population (2021): 52
- Time zone: UTC+3 (TRT)

Doğancılar is a village in the Gölpazarı District, Bilecik Province, Turkey. Its population is 52 (2021).
