= İkizce, Bilecik =

İkizce
- Village
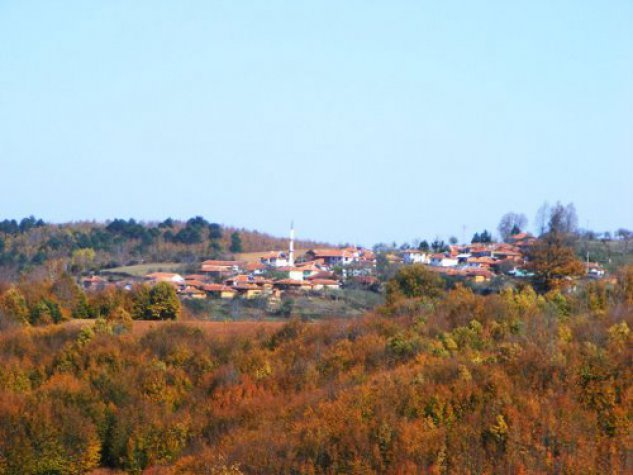
- Ikizce

- Location within Turkey Location within Marmara
- Country: Turkey
- Province: Bilecik
- District: Bilecik
- Population (2021): 116
- Time zone: UTC+3 (TRT)

İkizce is a village in the Bilecik District, Bilecik Province, Turkey. Its population is 116 (2021).
