= Alıç, Gölpazarı =

Alıç
- Village
- Location in Turkey Alıç (Marmara)
- Coordinates: 40°20′35″N 30°22′46″E
- Country: Turkey
- Province: Bilecik
- District: Gölpazarı
- Population (2021): 54
- Time zone: UTC+3 (TRT)

Alıç is a village in Gölpazarı District, Bilecik Province, Turkey. As of 2021, it had a population of 54 people.
