= Küçüksusuz, Gölpazarı =

Küçüksusuz
- Village
- Location within Turkey Location within Marmara
- Coordinates: 40°17′N 30°11′E
- Country: Turkey
- Province: Bilecik
- District: Gölpazarı
- Population (2021): 68
- Time zone: UTC+3 (TRT)

Küçüksusuz is a village in the Gölpazarı District, Bilecik Province, Turkey. Its population is 68 (2021).
