= İncirli, Gölpazarı =

İncirli
- Village
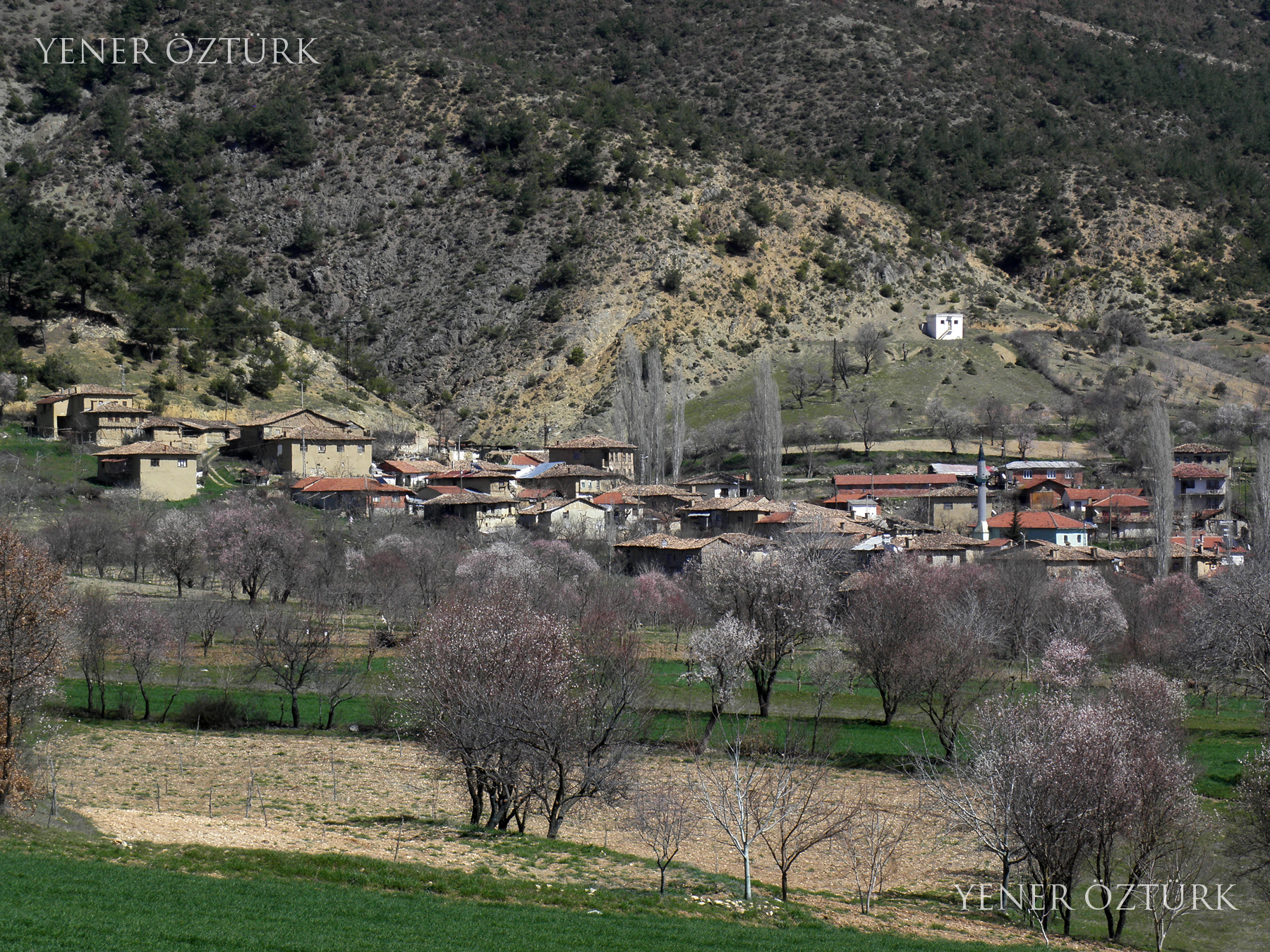

- Location within Turkey Location within Marmara
- Coordinates: 40.2073°N 30.2216°E
- Country: Turkey
- Province: Bilecik
- District: Gölpazarı
- Population (2021): 60
- Time zone: UTC+3 (TRT)

İncirli is a village in the Gölpazarı District, Bilecik Province, Turkey. Its population is 60 (2021).
