= Üyük, Gölpazarı =

Üyük
- Village
- Location within Turkey Location within Marmara
- Coordinates: 40.2695°N 30.1087°E
- Country: Turkey
- Province: Bilecik
- District: Gölpazarı
- Population (2021): 140
- Time zone: UTC+3 (TRT)

Üyük is a village in the Gölpazarı District, Bilecik Province, Turkey. Its population is 140 (2021).
