= Bedi, Gölpazarı =

Bedi
- Village
- Location within Turkey Location within Marmara
- Country: Turkey
- Province: Bilecik
- District: Gölpazarı
- Population (2021): 149
- Time zone: UTC+3 (TRT)

Bedi (formerly: Üzümlü) is a village in the Gölpazarı District, Bilecik Province, Turkey. Its population is 149 (2021).

== History ==
Bedi village of the ancestors coming from Oghuz Turks Kayı tribe Karakeçili tribe in history.

The oldest name of Bedi are Çiftlik-i Bedi (1487-1521) and Karyer-i Bedi(1527). Also Bedi name like Oghuz Turks's Beğdili tribe.
