= Kavacık, Yenipazar =

Kavacık
- Village
- Location within Turkey Location within Marmara
- Coordinates: 40.1646°N 30.4020°E
- Country: Turkey
- Province: Bilecik
- District: Yenipazar
- Population (2021): 95
- Time zone: UTC+3 (TRT)

Kavacık is a village in the Yenipazar District, Bilecik Province, Turkey. Its population is 95 (2021).
