= Hacıköy, Gölpazarı =

Hacıköy
- Village
- Location within Turkey Location within Marmara
- Coordinates: 40.2720°N 30.4794°E
- Country: Turkey
- Province: Bilecik
- District: Gölpazarı
- Population (2021): 13
- Time zone: UTC+3 (TRT)

Hacıköy is a village in the Gölpazarı District, Bilecik Province, Turkey. Its population is 13 (2021).
