= Ayvacık, Bilecik =

Ayvacık
- Village
- Location within Turkey Location within Marmara
- Coordinates: 40.1711°N 29.8555°E
- Country: Turkey
- Province: Bilecik
- District: Bilecik
- Population (2021): 54
- Time zone: UTC+3 (TRT)

Ayvacık is a village in the Bilecik District, Bilecik Province, Turkey. Its population is 54 (2021).
