= Alpağut, Bilecik =

Alpağut
- Village
- Location within Turkey Location within Marmara
- Coordinates: 40.1987°N 29.8170°E
- Country: Turkey
- Province: Bilecik
- District: Bilecik
- Population (2021): 217
- Time zone: UTC+3 (TRT)

Alpağut is a village in the Bilecik District, Bilecik Province, Turkey. Its population is 217 (2021).
