= Derecikören, Gölpazarı =

Derecikören
- Village
- Location within Turkey Location within Marmara
- Coordinates: 40.3028°N 30.1988°E
- Country: Turkey
- Province: Bilecik
- District: Gölpazarı
- Population (2021): 24
- Time zone: UTC+3 (TRT)

Derecikören is a village in the Gölpazarı District, Bilecik Province, Turkey. Its population is 24 (2021).
