= Taşçılar, Bilecik =

Taşçılar
- Village
- Location within Turkey Location within Marmara
- Country: Turkey
- Province: Bilecik
- District: Bilecik
- Population (2021): 188
- Time zone: UTC+3 (TRT)

Taşçılar is a village in the Bilecik District, Bilecik Province, Turkey. Its population is 188 (2021).
