= Tozman, İnhisar =

Tozman
- Village
- Location within Turkey Location within Marmara
- Coordinates: 40°05′N 30°30′E
- Country: Turkey
- Province: Bilecik
- District: İnhisar
- Population (2021): 108
- Time zone: UTC+3 (TRT)

Tozman is a village in the İnhisar District, Bilecik Province, Turkey. Its population is 108 (2021).
