= Katran, Yenipazar =

Katran
- Village
- Location within Turkey Location within Marmara
- Coordinates: 40.2362°N 30.5500°E
- Country: Turkey
- Province: Bilecik
- District: Yenipazar
- Population (2021): 137
- Time zone: UTC+3 (TRT)

Katran is a village in the Yenipazar District, Bilecik Province, Turkey. Its population is 137 (2021).
