= Göldağı, Gölpazarı =

Göldağı
- Village
- Location within Turkey Location within Marmara
- Coordinates: 40.2184°N 30.2124°E
- Country: Turkey
- Province: Bilecik
- District: Gölpazarı
- Population (2021): 21
- Time zone: UTC+3 (TRT)

Göldağı is a village in the Gölpazarı District, Bilecik Province, Turkey. Its population is 21 (2021).
