= Aşağıboğaz, Yenipazar =

Aşağıboğaz
- Village
- Location within Turkey Location within Marmara
- Coordinates: 40.2309°N 30.5851°E
- Country: Turkey
- Province: Bilecik
- District: Yenipazar
- Population (2021): 76
- Time zone: UTC+3 (TRT)

Aşağıboğaz is a village in the Yenipazar District, Bilecik Province, Turkey. Its population is 76 (2021).
