= Yumaklı, Yenipazar =

Yumaklı
- Village
- Location within Turkey Location within Marmara
- Coordinates: 40.1799°N 30.4285°E
- Country: Turkey
- Province: Bilecik
- District: Yenipazar
- Population (2021): 61
- Time zone: UTC+3 (TRT)

Yumaklı is a village in the Yenipazar District, Bilecik Province, Turkey. Its population is 61 (2021).
