= Aşağıçaylı, Yenipazar =

Aşağıçaylı
- Village
- Location within Turkey Location within Marmara
- Coordinates: 40.1628°N 30.5893°E
- Country: Turkey
- Province: Bilecik
- District: Yenipazar
- Population (2021): 43
- Time zone: UTC+3 (TRT)

Aşağıçaylı is a village in the Yenipazar District, Bilecik Province, Turkey. Its population is 43 (2021).
