= Çiftlik, Gölpazarı =

Çiftlik
- Village
- Location within Turkey Location within Marmara
- Coordinates: 40.2974°N 30.4083°E
- Country: Turkey
- Province: Bilecik
- District: Gölpazarı
- Population (2021): 60
- Time zone: UTC+3 (TRT)

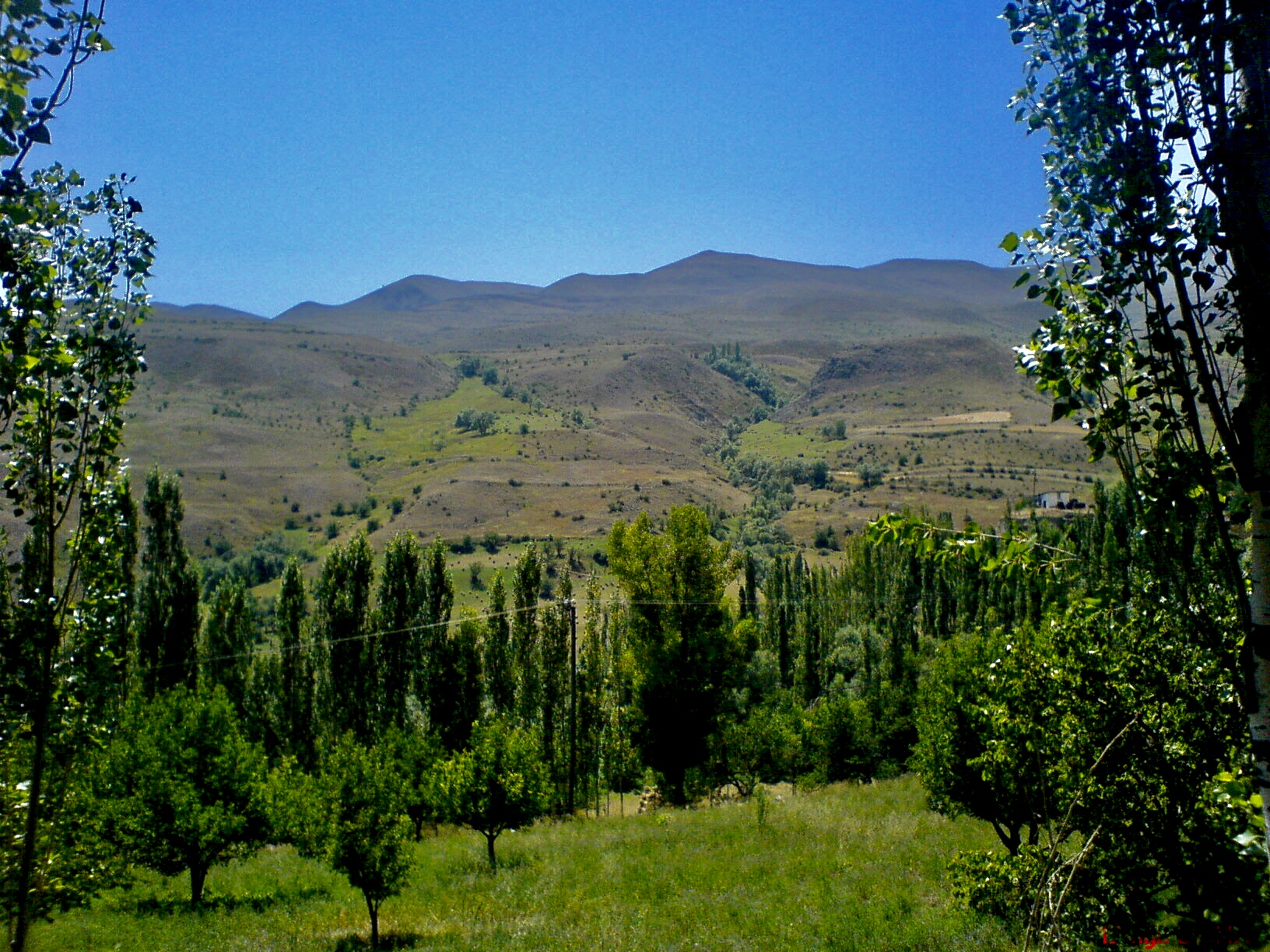

Çiftlik (also: Çiftlikköy) is a village in the Gölpazarı District, Bilecik Province, Turkey. Its population is 60 (2021).
