= Softalar, Gölpazarı =

Softalar
- Village
- Location within Turkey Location within Marmara
- Coordinates: 40.2743°N 30.4448°E
- Country: Turkey
- Province: Bilecik
- District: Gölpazarı
- Population (2021): 59
- Time zone: UTC+3 (TRT)

Softalar is a village in the Gölpazarı District, Bilecik Province, Turkey. It is located close to Akçay Dam on the Akçay River, a tributary of Sakarya River. The village population is 59 (2021).
