= Arıcaklar, Gölpazarı =

Arıcaklar
- Village
- Location in Turkey Arıcaklar (Marmara)
- Coordinates: 40°17′N 30°22′E
- Country: Turkey
- Province: Bilecik
- District: Gölpazarı
- Population (2021): 99
- Time zone: UTC+3 (TRT)

Arıcaklar is a village in Gölpazarı District, Bilecik Province, Turkey. As of 2021, it had a population of 99 people.
