= Gözaçanlar, Gölpazarı =

Gözaçanlar
- Village
- Location within Turkey Location within Marmara
- Coordinates: 40°16′N 30°29′E
- Country: Turkey
- Province: Bilecik
- District: Gölpazarı
- Population (2021): 34
- Time zone: UTC+3 (TRT)

Gözaçanlar is a village in the Gölpazarı District, Bilecik Province, Turkey. Its population is 34 (2021).
