= Bayat, Gölpazarı =

Bayat
- Village
- Location within Turkey Location within Marmara
- Coordinates: 40.1884°N 30.2657°E
- Country: Turkey
- Province: Bilecik
- District: Gölpazarı
- Population (2021): 64
- Time zone: UTC+3 (TRT)

Bayat is a village in the Gölpazarı District, Bilecik Province, Turkey. Its population is 64 (2021).
