= Bayırköy, Bilecik =

Bayırköy
- Municipality
- Location in Turkey Bayırköy (Marmara)
- Coordinates: 40°19′N 30°01′E
- Country: Turkey
- Province: Bilecik
- District: Bilecik
- Elevation: 140 m (460 ft)
- Population (2021): 1,793
- Time zone: UTC+3 (TRT)
- Postal code: 11120
- Area code: 0228

Bayırköy is a town (belde) and municipality in the Bilecik District, Bilecik Province, Turkey. Its population is 1,793 (2021). It is about 20 kilometres (12 mi) north of Bilecik. Bayırköy consists of the quarters Fatih, Gazi and Sarmaşık.

The town has been relocated in 1948 to its present location after a landslide in its former location slightly at the west. The economy of the town depends on vegetable farming and sericulture. There are also some factories around the town.
