= Taşçıahiler, Gölpazarı =

Taşçıahiler
- Village
- Location within Turkey Location within Marmara
- Coordinates: 40°21′N 30°20′E
- Country: Turkey
- Province: Bilecik
- District: Gölpazarı
- Population (2021): 19
- Time zone: UTC+3 (TRT)

Taşçıahiler is a village in the Gölpazarı District, Bilecik Province, Turkey. Its population is 19 (2021).
