= Nasuhlar, Yenipazar =

Nasuhlar
- Village
- Location within Turkey Location within Marmara
- Coordinates: 40.1761°N 30.5874°E
- Country: Turkey
- Province: Bilecik
- District: Yenipazar
- Population (2021): 62
- Time zone: UTC+3 (TRT)

Nasuhlar is a village in the Yenipazar District, Bilecik Province, Turkey. Its population is 62 (2021).
