= Başköy, Bilecik =

Başköy
- Village
- A road in Başköy

- Location within Turkey Location within Marmara
- Coordinates: 40.0890°N 30.0054°E
- Country: Turkey
- Province: Bilecik
- District: Bilecik
- Population (2021): 177
- Time zone: UTC+3 (TRT)

Başköy is a village in the Bilecik District, Bilecik Province, Turkey. Its population is 177 (2021).
