= Kavak, Gölpazarı =

Kavak
- Village
- Location within Turkey Location within Marmara
- Coordinates: 40.3463°N 30.4339°E
- Country: Turkey
- Province: Bilecik
- District: Gölpazarı
- Population (2021): 156
- Time zone: UTC+3 (TRT)

Kavak is a village in the Gölpazarı District, Bilecik Province, Turkey. Its population is 156 (2021).
