= Erkoca, Bilecik =

Erkoca
- Village
- Location within Turkey Location within Marmara
- Coordinates: 40°13′N 29°48′E
- Country: Turkey
- Province: Bilecik
- District: Bilecik
- Population (2021): 70
- Time zone: UTC+3 (TRT)

Erkoca is a village in the Bilecik District, Bilecik Province, Turkey. Its population is 70 (2021).
