= Yukarıçaylı, Yenipazar =

Yukarıçaylı
- Village
- Location within Turkey Location within Marmara
- Coordinates: 40.154°N 30.592°E
- Country: Turkey
- Province: Bilecik
- District: Yenipazar
- Population (2021): 38
- Time zone: UTC+3 (TRT)

Yukarıçaylı is a village in the Yenipazar District, Bilecik Province, Turkey. Its population is 38 (2021).
