= Köprücek, Gölpazarı =

Köprücek
- Village
- Location within Turkey Location within Marmara
- Coordinates: 40.3781°N 30.3684°E
- Country: Turkey
- Province: Bilecik
- District: Gölpazarı
- Population (2021): 103
- Time zone: UTC+3 (TRT)

Köprücek is a village in the Gölpazarı District, Bilecik Province, Turkey. Its population is 103 (2021).
