= Çukurören, Bilecik =

Çukurören
- Village
- Location within Turkey Location within Marmara
- Coordinates: 40°13′23″N 29°56′56″E
- Country: Turkey
- Province: Bilecik
- District: Bilecik
- Population (2021): 191
- Time zone: UTC+3 (TRT)

Çukurören is a village in the Bilecik District, Bilecik Province, Turkey. Its population is 191 (2021).
