= Çakırpınar, Bilecik =

Çakırpınar
- Village
- Location within Turkey Location within Marmara
- Coordinates: 40.1497°N 29.9111°E
- Country: Turkey
- Province: Bilecik
- District: Bilecik
- Population (2021): 54
- Time zone: UTC+3 (TRT)

Çakırpınar is a village in the Bilecik District, Bilecik Province, Turkey. Its population is 54 (2021).
