= Abadiye, Bilecik =

Abadiye
- Village
- Location within Turkey Location within Marmara
- Coordinates: 40°10′N 29°44′E
- Country: Turkey
- Province: Bilecik
- District: Bilecik
- Population (2021): 134
- Time zone: UTC+3 (TRT)

Abadiye is a village in the Bilecik District, Bilecik Province, Turkey. Its population is 134 (2021).
