= Belkese, Yenipazar =

Belkese
- Village
- Location within Turkey Location within Marmara
- Coordinates: 40.2097°N 30.4852°E
- Country: Turkey
- Province: Bilecik
- District: Yenipazar
- Population (2021): 132
- Time zone: UTC+3 (TRT)

Belkese is a village in the Yenipazar District, Bilecik Province, Turkey. Its population is 132 (2021).
