= Künceğiz, Bilecik =

Künceğiz
- Village
- Location within Turkey Location within Marmara
- Coordinates: 40°09′N 29°48′E
- Country: Turkey
- Province: Bilecik
- District: Bilecik
- Population (2021): 77
- Time zone: UTC+3 (TRT)

Künceğiz is a village in the Bilecik District, Bilecik Province, Turkey. Its population is 77 (2021).
