= Esenköy, Yenipazar =

Esenköy
- Village
- Location within Turkey Location within Marmara
- Coordinates: 40.2042°N 30.4159°E
- Country: Turkey
- Province: Bilecik
- District: Yenipazar
- Population (2021): 88
- Time zone: UTC+3 (TRT)

Esenköy is a village in the Yenipazar District, Bilecik Province, Turkey. Its population is 88 (2021).
