= Selbükü, Bilecik =

Selbükü
- Village
- Location within Turkey Location within Marmara
- Coordinates: 40°11′N 30°07′E
- Country: Turkey
- Province: Bilecik
- District: Bilecik
- Population (2021): 86
- Time zone: UTC+3 (TRT)

Selbükü is a village in the Bilecik District, Bilecik Province, Turkey. Its population is 86 (2021).
