= Deresakarı, Bilecik =

Deresakarı
- Village
- Location within Turkey Location within Marmara
- Coordinates: 40°09′N 30°08′E
- Country: Turkey
- Province: Bilecik
- District: Bilecik
- Population (2021): 235
- Time zone: UTC+3 (TRT)

Deresakarı is a village in the Bilecik District, Bilecik Province, Turkey. Its population is 235 (2021).
