= Sorguncukahiler, Yenipazar =

Sorguncukahiler
- Village
- Location within Turkey Location within Marmara
- Country: Turkey
- Province: Bilecik
- District: Yenipazar
- Population (2021): 60
- Time zone: UTC+3 (TRT)

Sorguncukahiler is a village in the Yenipazar District, Bilecik Province, Turkey. Its population is 60 (2021).
