= Çukurören, Gölpazarı =

Çukurören
- Village
- Location within Turkey Location within Marmara
- Coordinates: 40.3163°N 30.2911°E
- Country: Turkey
- Province: Bilecik
- District: Gölpazarı
- Population (2021): 26
- Time zone: UTC+3 (TRT)

Çukurören is a village in the Gölpazarı District, Bilecik Province, Turkey. Its population is 26 (2021).
