= Muratça, İnhisar =

Muratça
- Village
- Location within Turkey Location within Marmara
- Coordinates: 40°07′N 30°27′E
- Country: Turkey
- Province: Bilecik
- District: İnhisar
- Population (2021): 25
- Time zone: UTC+3 (TRT)

Muratça is a village in the İnhisar District, Bilecik Province, Turkey. Its population is 25 (2021).
