= Çayköy, İnhisar =

Çayköy
- Village
- Location within Turkey Location within Marmara
- Coordinates: 40.0473°N 30.4511°E
- Country: Turkey
- Province: Bilecik
- District: İnhisar
- Population (2021): 93
- Time zone: UTC+3 (TRT)

Çayköy is a village in the İnhisar District, Bilecik Province, Turkey. Its population is 93 (2021).
