= Çımışkı, Gölpazarı =

Çımışkı
- Village
- Location within Turkey Location within Marmara
- Coordinates: 40°16′N 30°22′E
- Country: Turkey
- Province: Bilecik
- District: Gölpazarı
- Population (2021): 30
- Time zone: UTC+3 (TRT)

Çımışkı is a village in the Gölpazarı District, Bilecik Province, Turkey. Its population is 30 (2021).
