= Koyunlu, İnhisar =

Koyunlu
- Village
- Location within Turkey Location within Marmara
- Coordinates: 40.0909°N 30.3597°E
- Country: Turkey
- Province: Bilecik
- District: İnhisar
- Population (2021): 124
- Time zone: UTC+3 (TRT)

Koyunlu is a village in the İnhisar District, Bilecik Province, Turkey. Its population is 124 (2021).
