= Okluca, Bilecik =

Okluca
- Village
- Location within Turkey Location within Marmara
- Coordinates: 40°14′N 29°51′E
- Country: Turkey
- Province: Bilecik
- District: Bilecik
- Population (2021): 62
- Time zone: UTC+3 (TRT)

Okluca is a village in the Bilecik District, Bilecik Province, Turkey. Its population is 62 (2021).
