= Söğütcük, Gölpazarı =

Söğütcük
- Village
- Location in Turkey Söğütcük (Marmara)
- Coordinates: 40.3393°N 30.2477°E
- Country: Turkey
- Province: Bilecik
- District: Gölpazarı
- Population (2021): 110
- Time zone: UTC+3 (TRT)

Söğütcük is a village in Gölpazarı District, Bilecik Province, Turkey. As of 2021, it had a population of 110 people.
