= Bilecik District =

District of Bilecik Province, Turkey

- District
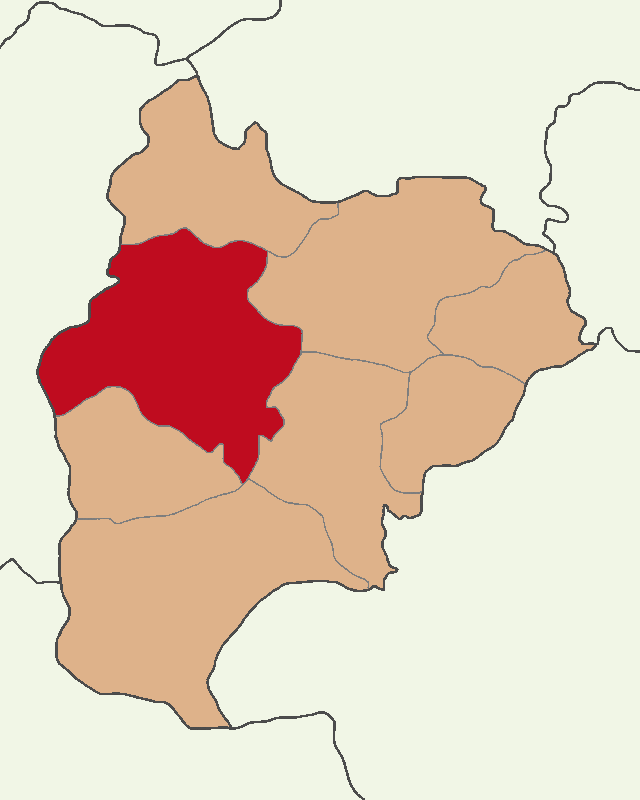
- Map showing Bilecik District in Bilecik Province

- Location in Turkey Bilecik District (Marmara)
- Coordinates: 40°09′N 29°59′E
- Country: Turkey
- Province: Bilecik
- Seat: Bilecik
- Area: 793 km^{2} (306 sq mi)
- Population (2021): 86,442
  - Density: 109/km^{2} (282/sq mi)
- Time zone: UTC+3 (TRT)

Bilecik District (also: Merkez, meaning "central") is a district of Bilecik Province of Turkey. Its seat is the city of Bilecik. Its area is 793 km^{2}, and its population is 86,442 (2021).

== Composition ==
There are three municipalities in Bilecik District:

- Bayırköy
- Bilecik
- Vezirhan

There are 45 villages in Bilecik District:

- Abadiye
- Abbaslık
- Ahmetpınar
- Alpağut
- Ayvacık
- Bahçecik
- Başköy
- Bekdemir
- Beyce
- Çakırpınar
- Çavuşköy
- Çukurören
- Cumalı
- Deresakarı
- Dereşemsettin
- Elmabahçe
- Erkoca
- Gökpınar
- Gülümbe
- Hasandere
- İkizce
- İlyasbey
- İlyasça
- Kapaklı
- Karaağaç
- Kavaklı
- Kendirli
- Kepirler
- Kınık
- Kızıldamlar
- Koyunköy
- Künceğiz
- Küplü
- Kurtköy
- Kuyubaşı
- Necmiyeköy
- Okluca
- Ören
- Selbükü
- Selöz
- Şükraniye
- Sütlük
- Taşçılar
- Ulupınar
- Yeniköy
