= Kükürt, Yenipazar =

Kükürt
- Village
- Location within Turkey Location within Marmara
- Coordinates: 40.2653°N 30.5632°E
- Country: Turkey
- Province: Bilecik
- District: Yenipazar
- Population (2021): 158
- Time zone: UTC+3 (TRT)

Kükürt is a village in the Yenipazar District, Bilecik Province, Turkey. Its population is 158 (2021).
