= İlyasça, Bilecik =

İlyasça
- Village
- Location within Turkey Location within Marmara
- Coordinates: 40°17′N 29°54′E
- Country: Turkey
- Province: Bilecik
- District: Bilecik
- Population (2021): 212
- Time zone: UTC+3 (TRT)

İlyasça is a village in the Bilecik District, Bilecik Province, Turkey. Its population is 212 (2021).
