= Kümbet, Gölpazarı =

Kümbet
- Village
- Location within Turkey Location within Marmara
- Coordinates: 40.2180°N 30.3730°E
- Country: Turkey
- Province: Bilecik
- District: Gölpazarı
- Population (2021): 67
- Time zone: UTC+3 (TRT)

Kümbet is a village in the Gölpazarı District, Bilecik Province, Turkey. Its population is 67 (2021).
