= Akköy, İnhisar =

Akköy
- Village
- Location within Turkey Location within Marmara
- Coordinates: 40.1056°N 30.4467°E
- Country: Turkey
- Province: Bilecik
- District: İnhisar
- Population (2021): 85
- Time zone: UTC+3 (TRT)

Akköy is a village in the İnhisar District, Bilecik Province, Turkey. Its population is 85 (2021).
