= İnhisar District =

District of Bilecik Province, Turkey

- District
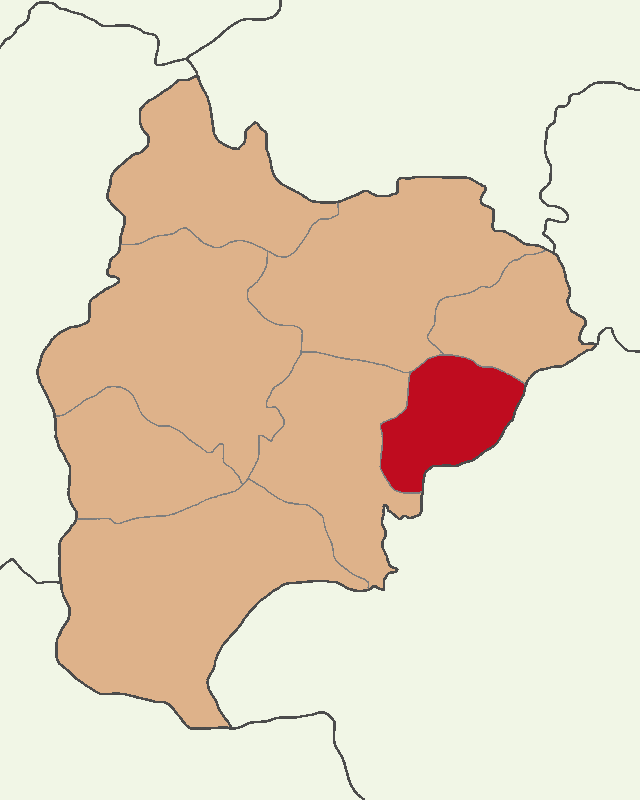
- Map showing İnhisar District in Bilecik Province

- Location in Turkey İnhisar District (Marmara)
- Coordinates: 40°3′N 30°23′E
- Country: Turkey
- Province: Bilecik
- Seat: İnhisar

Government
  - Kaymakam: Elif Nur Saçal
- Area: 244 km^{2} (94 sq mi)
- Population (2021): 2,183
  - Density: 8.9/km^{2} (23/sq mi)
- Time zone: UTC+3 (TRT)
- Website: www.inhisar.gov.tr

İnhisar District is a district of the Bilecik Province of Turkey. Its seat is the town İnhisar. Its area is 244 km^{2}, and its population is 2,183 (2021).

== Composition ==
There is one municipality in İnhisar District:

- İnhisar

There are 9 villages in İnhisar District:

- Akköy
- Çayköy
- Harmanköy
- Hisarcık
- Koyunlu
- Muratça
- Samrı
- Tarpak
- Tozman
