= Tongurlar, Gölpazarı =

Tongurlar
- Village
- Location within Turkey Location within Marmara
- Coordinates: 40°18′N 30°21′E
- Country: Turkey
- Province: Bilecik
- District: Gölpazarı
- Population (2021): 46
- Time zone: UTC+3 (TRT)

Tongurlar is a village in the Gölpazarı District, Bilecik Province, Turkey. Its population is 46 (2021).
