= Hisarcık, İnhisar =

Hisarcık
- Village
- Location within Turkey Location within Marmara
- Coordinates: 40.0118°N 30.3403°E
- Country: Turkey
- Province: Bilecik
- District: İnhisar
- Population (2021): 53
- Time zone: UTC+3 (TRT)

Hisarcık is a village in the İnhisar District, Bilecik Province, Turkey. Its population is 53 (2021).
