= Gökpınar Dam =

Coordinates: 37.7858°N 29.1288°E

- Location: Turkey

Gökpınar Dam is a dam in Denizli Province, Turkey, built between 1995 and 2002. The development was backed by the Turkish State Hydraulic Works.

== See also ==
- List of dams and reservoirs in Turkey
