= Şükraniye, Bilecik =

Şükraniye
- Village
- Location within Turkey Location within Marmara
- Country: Turkey
- Province: Bilecik
- District: Bilecik
- Population (2021): 106
- Time zone: UTC+3 (TRT)

Şükraniye is a village in the Bilecik District, Bilecik Province, Turkey. Its population is 106 (2021).
