= Beyce, Bilecik =

Beyce
- Village
- Location within Turkey Location within Marmara
- Coordinates: 40.2583°N 29.9093°E
- Country: Turkey
- Province: Bilecik
- District: Bilecik
- Population (2021): 216
- Time zone: UTC+3 (TRT)

Beyce is a village in the Bilecik District, Bilecik Province, Turkey. Its population is 216 (2021).
