= Demirhanlar, Gölpazarı =

Demirhanlar
- Village
- Location within Turkey Location within Marmara
- Coordinates: 40.2013°N 30.1911°E
- Country: Turkey
- Province: Bilecik
- District: Gölpazarı
- Population (2021): 58
- Time zone: UTC+3 (TRT)

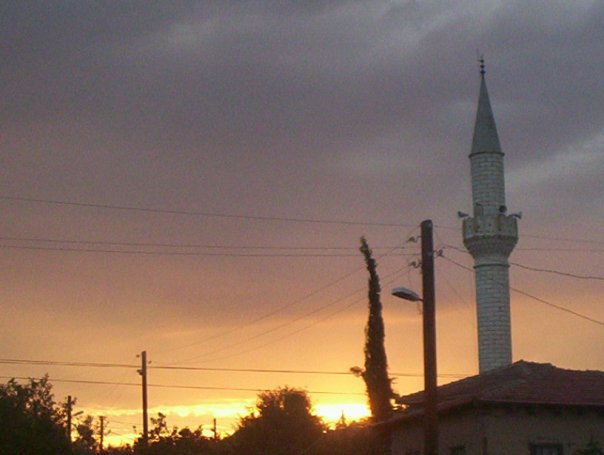
Sunrise in Demirhanlar

Demirhanlar is a village in the Gölpazarı District, Bilecik Province, Turkey. Its population is 58 (2021).
