= Gökpınar, Bilecik =

Gökpınar
- Village
- Location within Turkey Location within Marmara
- Coordinates: 40.2138°N 29.9227°E
- Country: Turkey
- Province: Bilecik
- District: Bilecik
- Population (2021): 91
- Time zone: UTC+3 (TRT)

Gökpınar is a village in the Bilecik District, Bilecik Province, Turkey. Its population is 91 (2021).
