= Gölpazarı =

- Municipality
- Location in Turkey Gölpazarı (Marmara)
- Coordinates: 40°17′5″N 30°19′2″E
- Country: Turkey
- Province: Bilecik
- District: Gölpazarı

Government
  - Mayor: Hayri Suer (AKP)
- Population (2021): 5,723
- Time zone: UTC+3 (TRT)
- Postal code: 11700
- Area code: 0228
- Website: www.golpazari.bel.tr

Gölpazarı is a town in Bilecik Province in the Marmara region of Turkey. It is the seat of Gölpazarı District. Its population is 5,723 (2021). The mayor is Hayri Suer (AKP).

== Features ==
Despite its proximity to the most important metropolises of Turkey, and its fertile lands, Gölpazarı never experienced overpopulation due to its isolated geography by the hills. As a result of archaeological excavations, Phrygians are thought to be the first founders of the town. Roman milestones still exist in the north of the town, passing from the village of Keskin. The town was one of the first Ottoman captured settlements in the region. A caravanserai known as "Taşhan" dated as early as 1412-which is one of the oldest buildings remained from early Ottoman period. Main scripture of the building has also great value on early Ottoman history since it mentions about Köse Mihal.
