= Gölpazarı District =

District of Bilecik Province, Turkey

- District
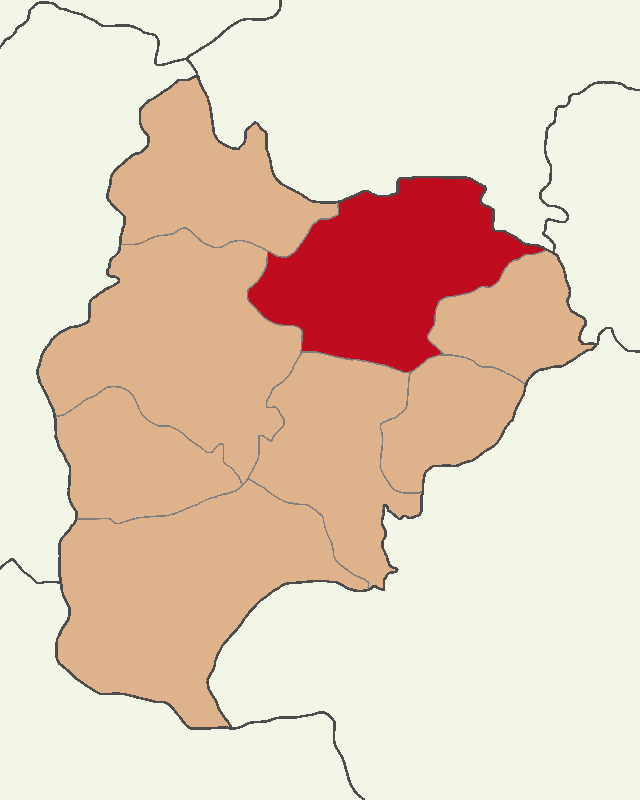
- Map showing Gölpazarı District in Bilecik Province

- Location in Turkey Gölpazarı District (Marmara)
- Coordinates: 40°17′N 30°19′E
- Country: Turkey
- Province: Bilecik
- Seat: Gölpazarı

Government
  - Kaymakam: Mustafa Nevzat Mercan
- Area: 670 km^{2} (260 sq mi)
- Population (2021): 9,031
  - Density: 13/km^{2} (35/sq mi)
- Time zone: UTC+3 (TRT)
- Website: www.golpazari.gov.tr

Gölpazarı District is a district of the Bilecik Province of Turkey. Its seat is the town Gölpazarı. Its area is 670 km^{2}, and its population is 9,031 (2021).

== Composition ==
There is one municipality in Gölpazarı District:

- Gölpazarı

There are 48 villages in Gölpazarı District:

- Akçakavak
- Aktaş
- Alıç
- Arıcaklar
- Armutçuk
- Baltalı
- Bayat
- Bedi
- Bolatlı
- Büyükbelen
- Büyüksürmeli
- Büyüksusuz
- Çengeller
- Çiftlik
- Çımışkı
- Çukurören
- Demirhanlar
- Derecikören
- Dereli
- Doğancılar
- Dokuz
- Gökçeler
- Gökçeözü
- Göldağı
- Gözaçanlar
- Hacıköy
- Hamidiye
- İncirli
- Karaağaç
- Karaahmetler
- Karacalar
- Kasımlar
- Kavak
- Keskin
- Köprücek
- Küçüksusuz
- Küçükyenice
- Kümbet
- Kurşunlu
- Kuşçuören
- Şahinler
- Sarıhacılar
- Softalar
- Söğütcük
- Taşçıahiler
- Tongurlar
- Türkmen
- Üyük
