= İnhisar =

- Municipality
- Location in Turkey İnhisar (Marmara)
- Coordinates: 40°2′58″N 30°23′7″E
- Country: Turkey
- Province: Bilecik
- District: İnhisar

Government
  - Mayor: Mehmet Kepez (AKP)
- Population (2021): 960
- Time zone: UTC+3 (TRT)
- Postal code: 11640
- Area code: 0228
- Website: www.inhisar.bel.tr

İnhisar is a town in Bilecik Province in the Marmara region of Turkey. It is the seat of İnhisar District. Its population is 960 (2021). The mayor is Mehmet Kepez (AKP).

== History ==
From 1867 until 1922, İnhisar was part of Hüdavendigâr vilayet.
