= Sarıcakaya =

- District and municipality
- Map showing Sarıcakaya District in Eskişehir Province

- Location in Turkey Sarıcakaya (Turkey Central Anatolia)
- Coordinates: 40°02′N 30°31′E
- Country: Turkey
- Province: Eskişehir

Government
  - Mayor: Ahmet Dönmez (AKP)
- Area: 382 km^{2} (147 sq mi)
- Elevation: 252 m (827 ft)
- Population (2022): 4,621
  - Density: 12.1/km^{2} (31.3/sq mi)
- Time zone: UTC+3 (TRT)
- Postal code: 26870
- Area code: 0222
- Website: www.saricakaya.bel.tr

Sarıcakaya is a municipality and district of Eskişehir Province, Turkey.

Its area is 382 km^{2}, and its population is 4,621 (2022). The town lies at an elevation of 252 m (827 ft).

On 15 August 2023, there was a temperature of 49.5 °C (121.1 °F) recorded in Sarıcakaya, setting the record for the highest temperature ever recorded in Turkey. The previous highest temperature record in Turkey was held by Cizre, Şırnak Province in southeast Turkey for 62 years. Sarıcakaya's highest temperature record was surpassed two years later in Silopi, Şırnak Province in southeast Turkey.

== Composition ==
There are 14 neighbourhoods in Sarıcakaya District:

- Beyköy
- Beyyayla
- Bilal Habeşi
- Camikebir
- Dağküplü
- Düzköy
- Fatih
- Güney
- İğdir
- Kapıkaya
- Laçin
- Mayıslar
- Sarıkaya
- Yeni
