= Yenipazar, Bilecik =

Yenipazar
- Municipality
- Location in Turkey Yenipazar (Marmara)
- Coordinates: 40°10′12″N 30°31′12″E
- Country: Turkey
- Province: Bilecik
- District: Yenipazar

Government
  - Mayor: İlhan Özden (MHP)
- Population (2021): 1,009
- Time zone: UTC+3 (TRT)
- Postal code: 11780
- Area code: 0228

Yenipazar, formerly Kırka, is a town in Bilecik Province in the Karadeniz region of Turkey. It is the seat of Yenipazar District. Its population is 1,009 (2021). The mayor is İlhan Özden (MHP).
