= Bilecik Province =

Province of Turkey

Coordinates: 40°06′24″N 30°07′33″E

Bilecik Province Bilecik ili
- Province
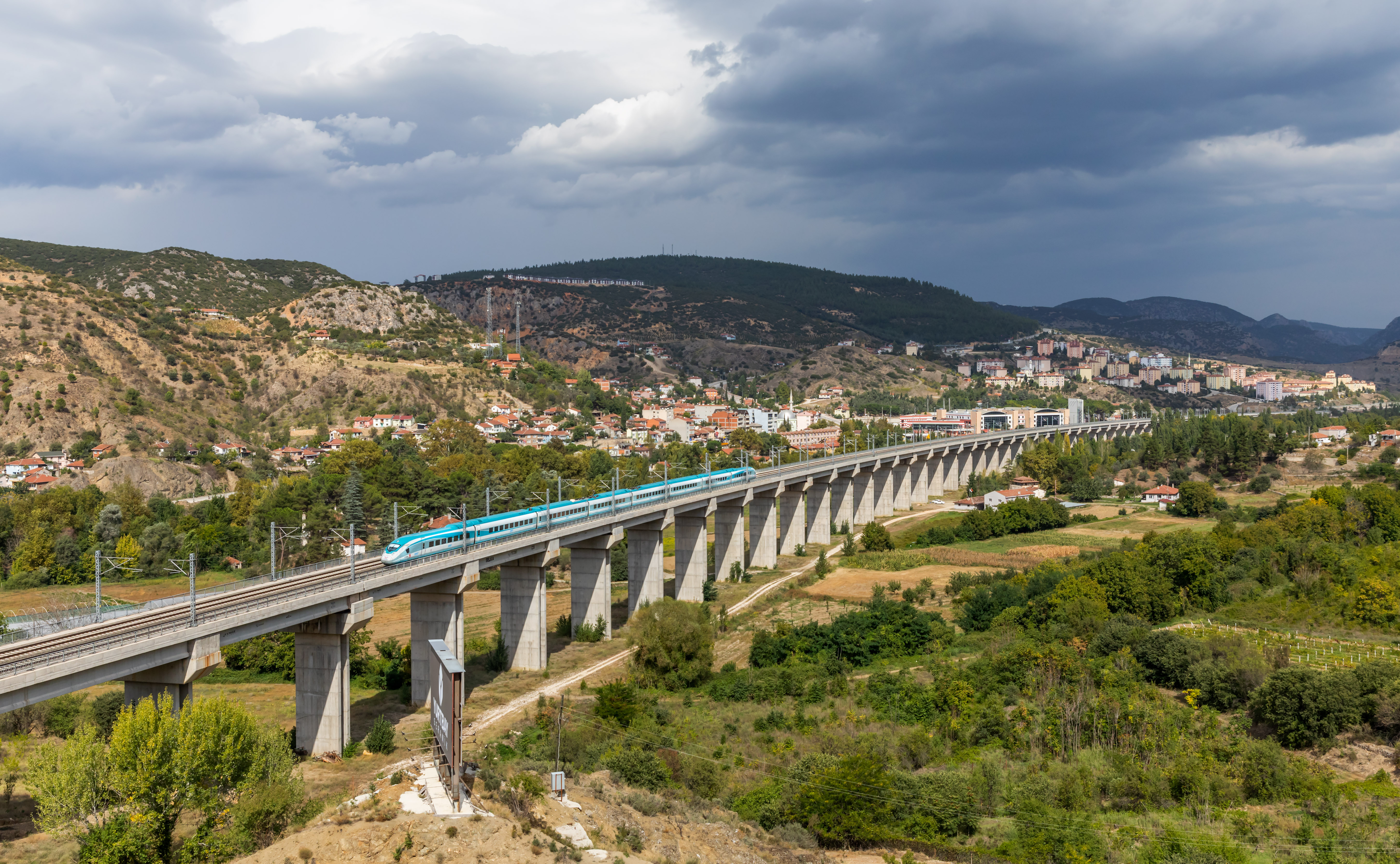
- High speed train at Bilecik

- Location of the province within Turkey
- Country: Turkey
- Seat: Bilecik

Government
  - Governor: Faik Oktay Sözer
- Area: 4,179 km^{2} (1,614 sq mi)
- Population (2022): 228,673
  - Density: 54.72/km^{2} (141.7/sq mi)
- Time zone: UTC+3 (TRT)
- Area code: 0228
- Website: www.bilecik.gov.tr

Bilecik Province (Turkish: Bilecik ili) is a province in midwest Turkey, neighboring Bursa to the west, Kocaeli and Sakarya to the north, Bolu to the east, Eskişehir to the southeast and Kütahya to the south. Its area is 4,179 km^{2}, and its population is 228,673 (2022). Most of the province is located in the Marmara region but eastern parts of Gölpazarı and Söğüt district and districts of İnhisar and Yenipazar remained in Black Sea Region, smaller southeastern parts of Bozüyük and Söğüt remained in Central Anatolia Region and smaller southwestern part of Bozüyük remained in Aegean Region.

== History ==
The region was inhabited as early as 3000 BC, and was part of the territory controlled by such notable civilizations as the Hittites (1400–1200 BC), the Phrygians (1200–676 BC), Lydians (595–546 BC), Persians (546–334 BC), Romans (74–395 AD) and Byzantians (395 AD to late 13th century, with two brief occupations by Umayyads in between).

The region also contains Söğüt, the small town where the Kayi tribe of Turkomans under Osman Gazi united as the Ottomans and founded the Ottoman Beylik which would later develop into the Ottoman Empire which was founded in 1299, and is the source of important archeological as well as cultural artifacts.

== Geography ==
Köppen map of Bilecik Province and surrounding regions:
- BSk
- Csa
- Csb
- Cfa
- Cfb
- Dsb

Bilecik Province contains wide array of geographical and climatic zones in its borders. The province is dominated by hills and deep valleys. The western end of the Anatolian Plateau is also located in the province. Sakarya River and Karasu are the most important rivers in the province.

== Districts ==
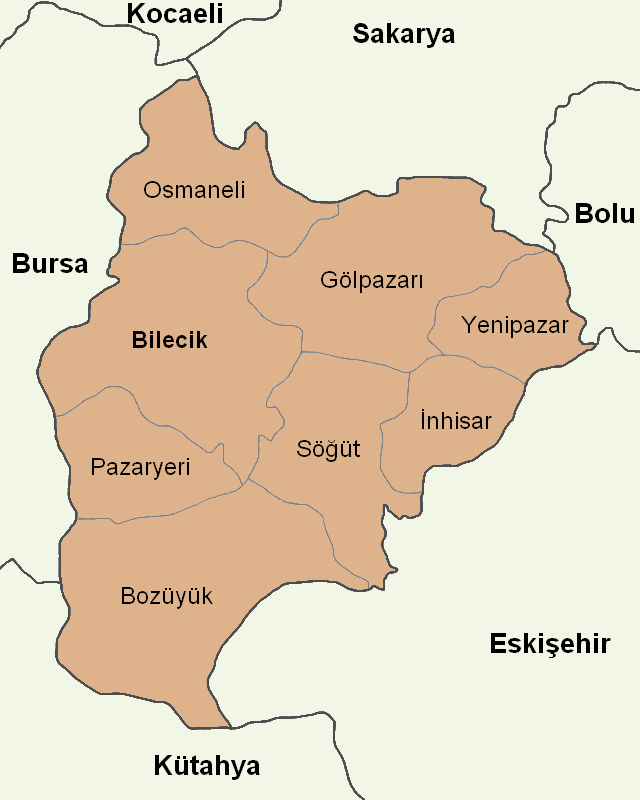

Bilecik province is divided into 8 districts (capital district in bold):

- **Bilecik**
- Bozüyük
- Gölpazarı
- İnhisar
- Osmaneli
- Pazaryeri
- Söğüt
- Yenipazar

== Demographics ==
Historical population
Year	Pop.	±% p.a.
1927	113,660	—
1935	125,421	+1.24%
1940	127,977	+0.40%
1950	137,030	+0.69%
1960	145,699	+0.62%
1970	138,856	−0.48%
1980	147,001	+0.57%
1990	175,526	+1.79%
2000	194,326	+1.02%
2010	225,381	+1.49%
2020	218,717	−0.30%
Source:Turkstat

== Sites of interest ==
In Söğüt a site of interest is the Ethnographical Museum.

The town Bilecik is famous for its numerous restored Turkish houses.

Some other sites of interest in the province are: Osman Gazi and Orhan Gazi Mosques, Seyh Edebali and Mal Hatun mausoleums, Köprülü Mehmet Pasha Mosque, Köprülü Caravanserai, Kaplikaya tombs, Rüstem Pasha Mosque, and Gülalan Pavilion.

== Gallery ==
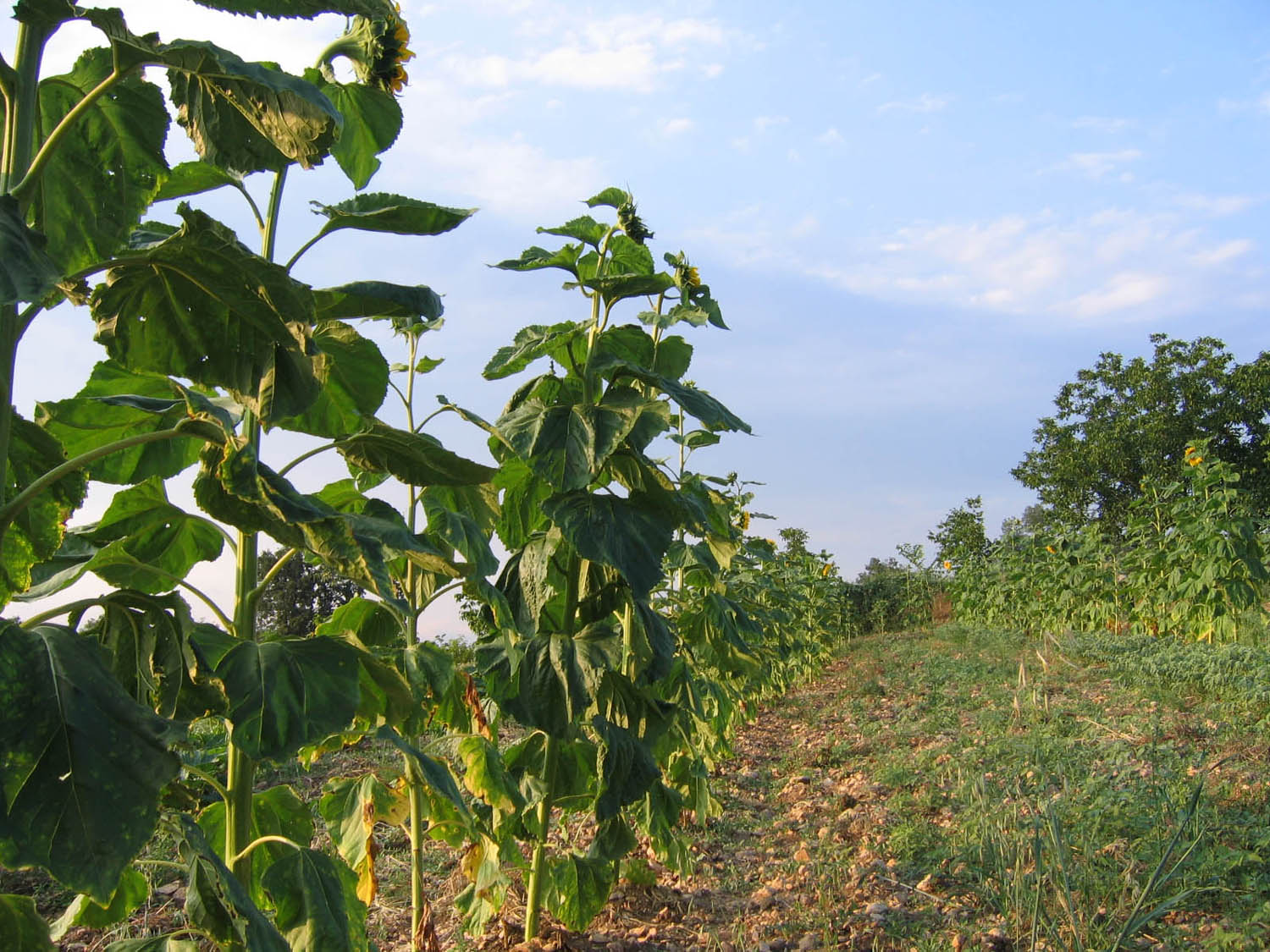
A view from Çengeller village in Gölpazarı

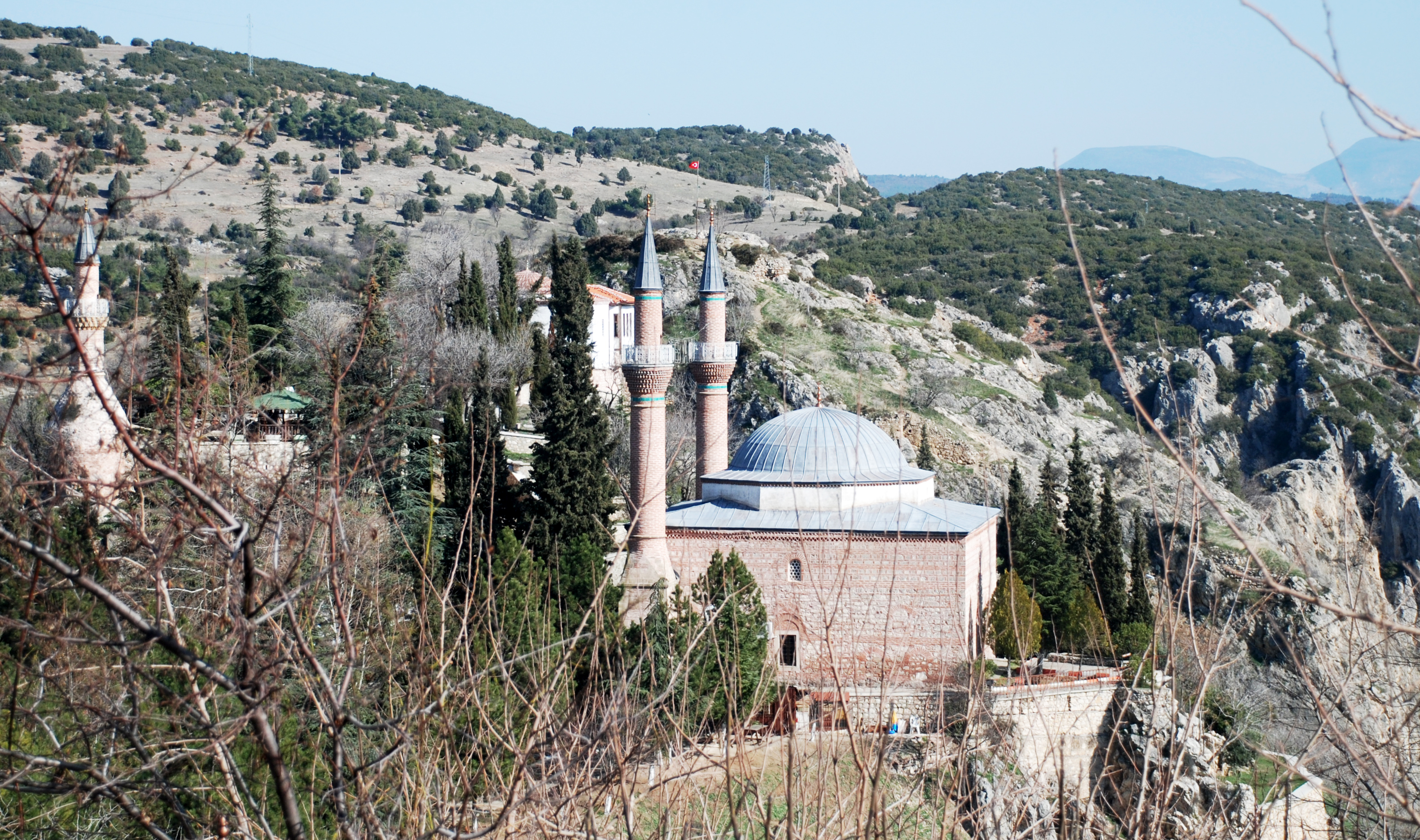
Sheikh Edebali tomb

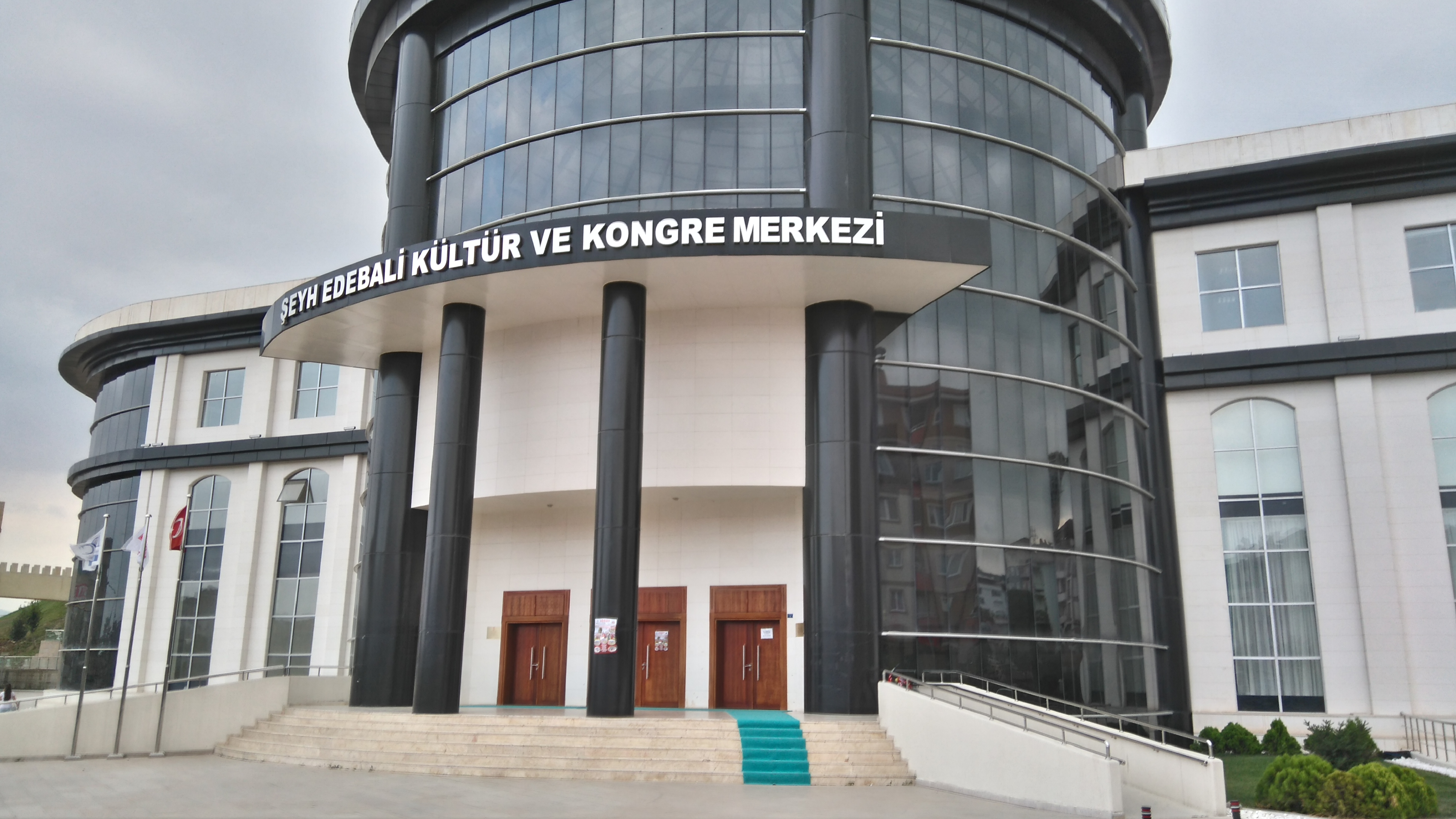
Bilecik Cultural Center

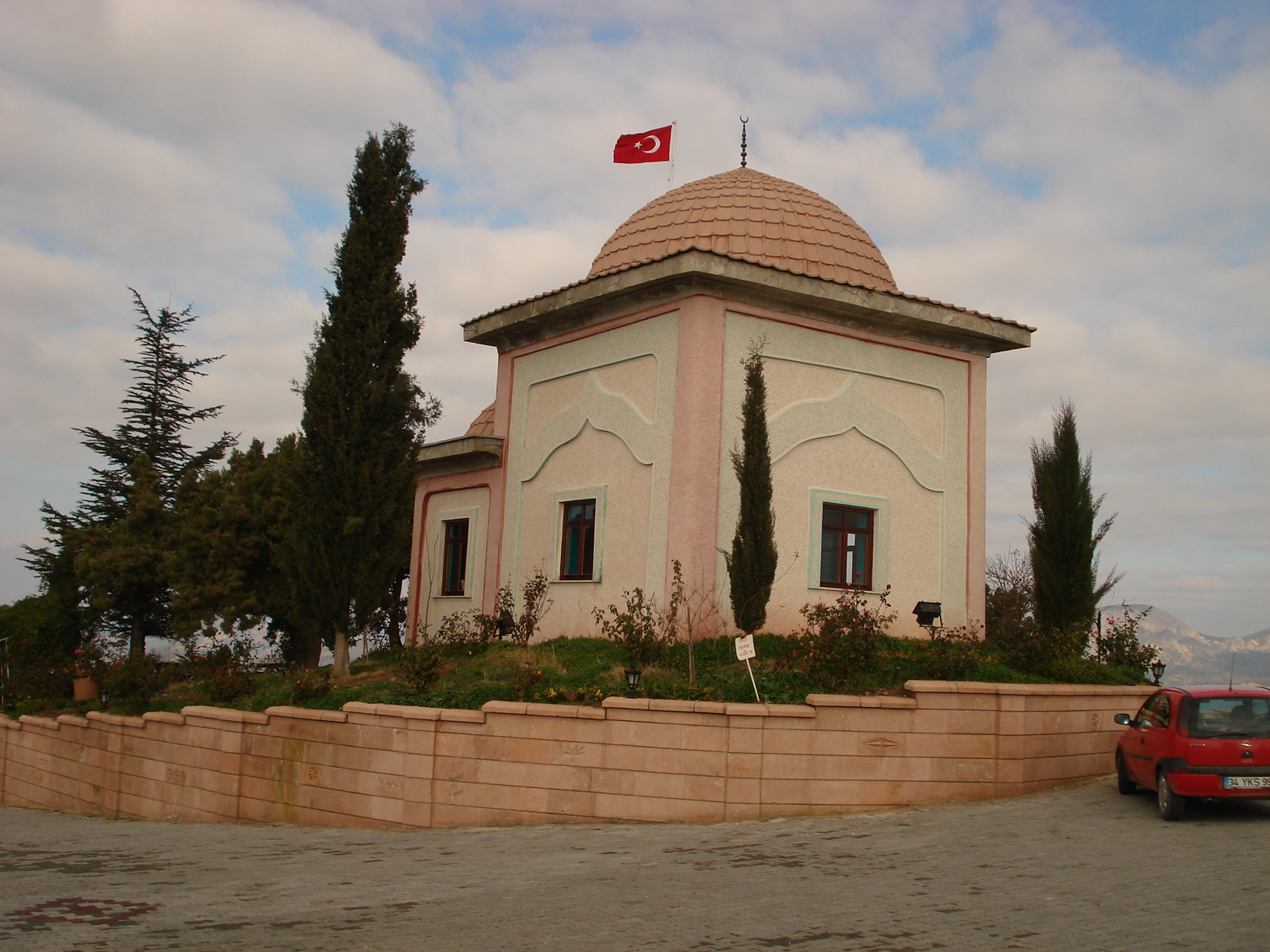
The türbe of Dursun Fakih in Söğüt

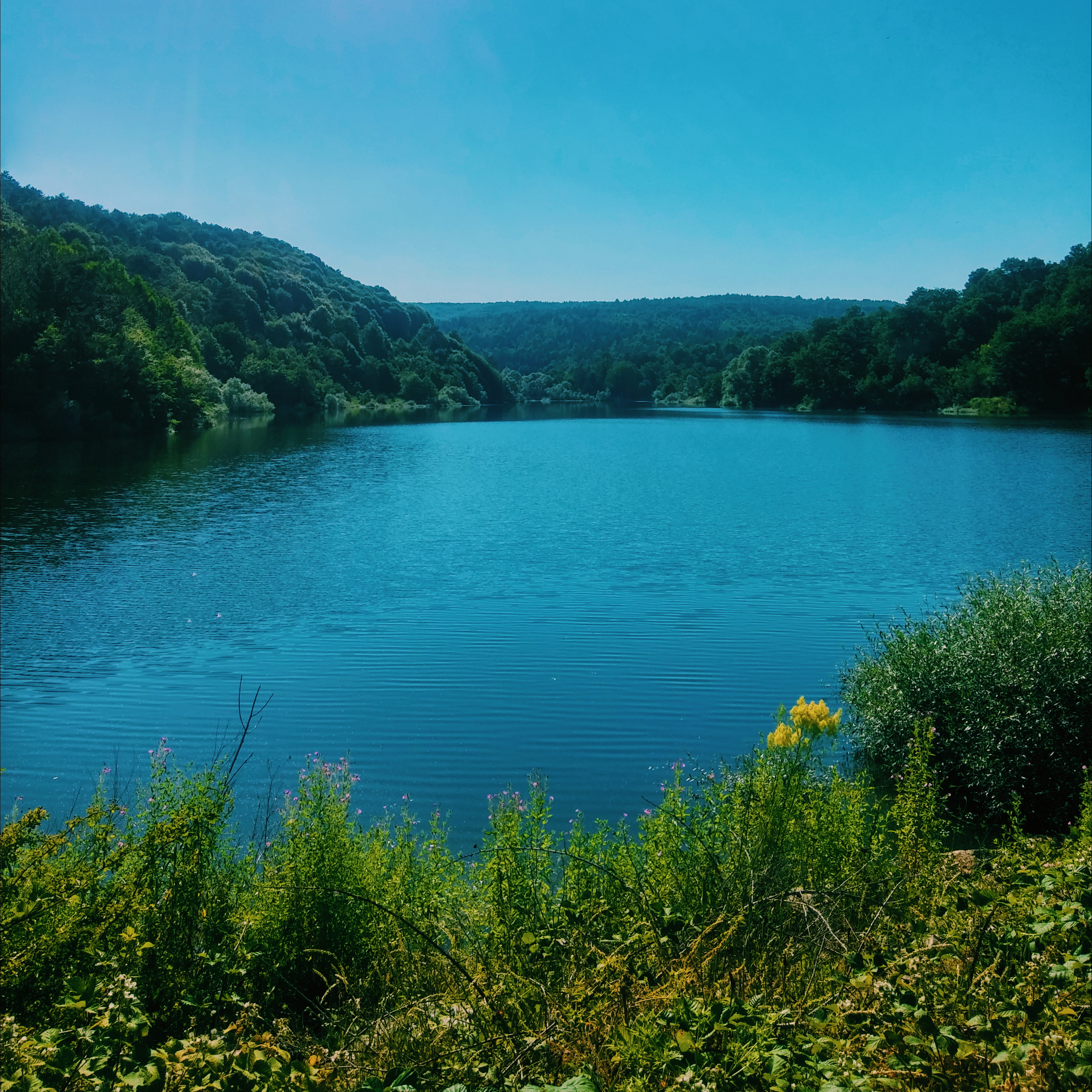
Küçükelmalı Nature Park Pond

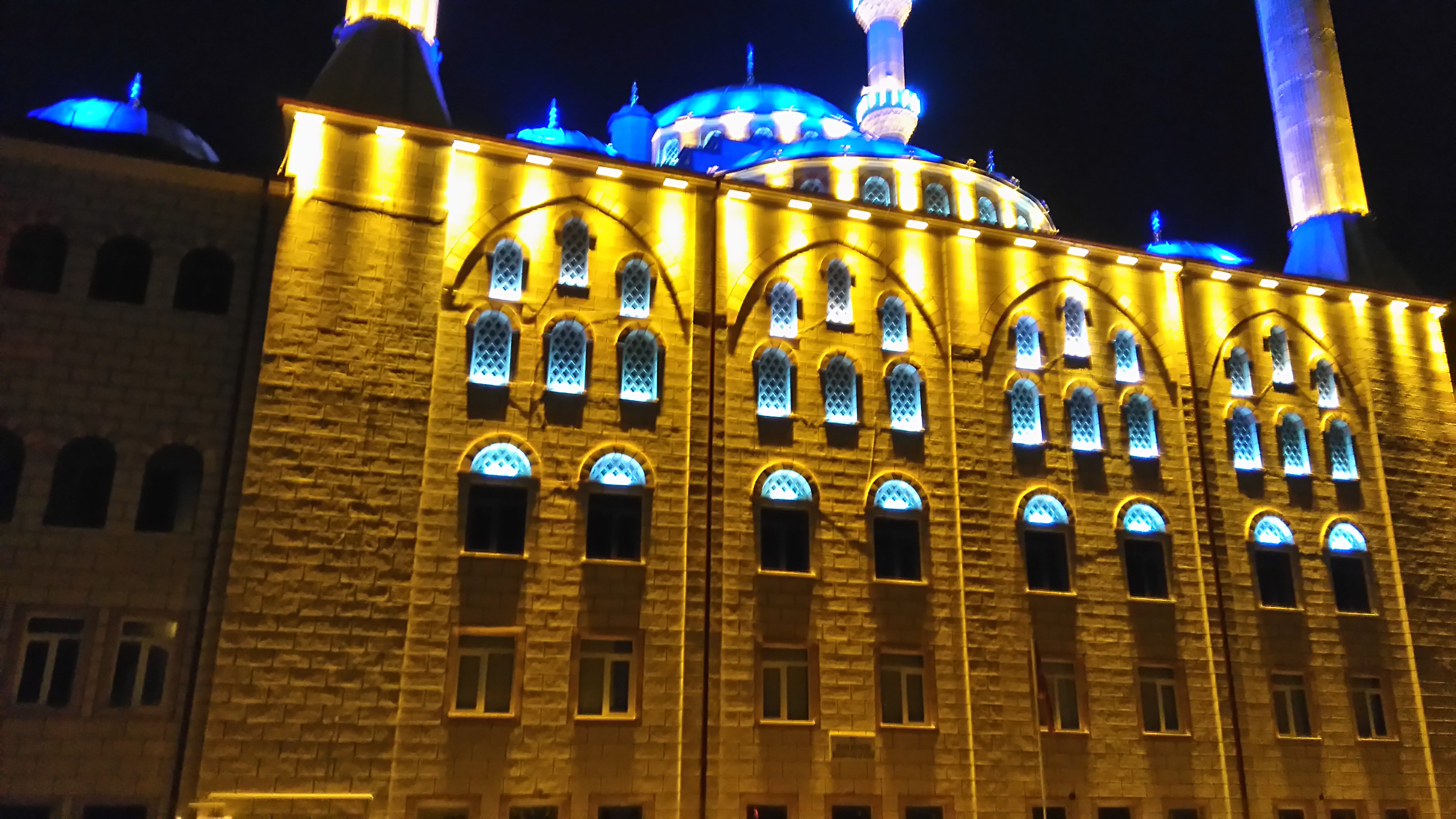
Bilecik Mosque

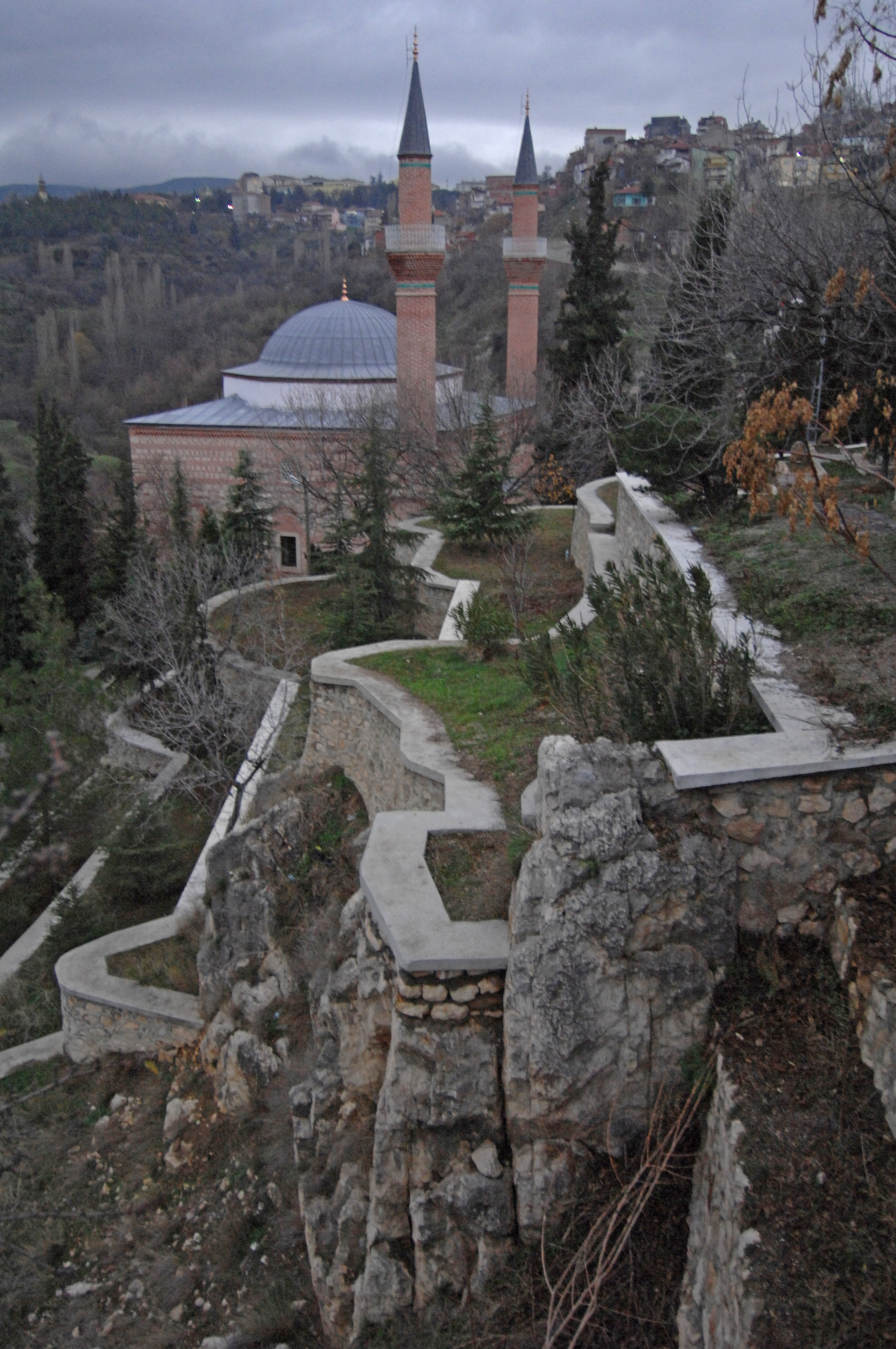
Bilecik Osman Gazi Mosque

== See also ==
- List of populated places in Bilecik Province
