= Akçapınar =

Akçapınar can refer to the following villages in Turkey:

- Akçapınar, Bozüyük
- Akçapınar, Çanakkale
- Akçapınar, Devrekani
- Akçapınar, Gönen
- Akçapınar, Keles
- Akçapınar, Kızıltepe
- Akçapınar, Mustafakemalpaşa
- Akçapınar, Osmaneli
- Akçapınar, Serik
- Akçapınar, Yenişehir
