= Bakkal =

Bakkal may refer to:

== People ==
- Mesut Bakkal, Turkish football manager
- Otman Bakkal, Dutch footballer of Moroccan origin

== Places ==
- Baqqal, or Bakkal, village and municipality in the Shaki Rayon of Azerbaijan
