= Müzeyyen Senar =

Turkish musician (1918–2015)

Müzeyyen Senar Müzeyyen Dombayoğlu
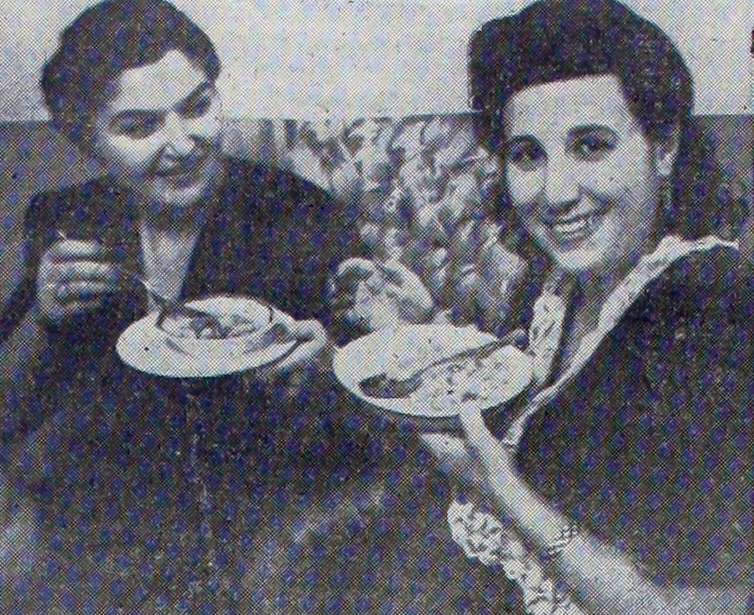
- Müzeyyen Senar (right) with Zehra Bilir (1950)

Background information
- Born: Zeliha Eren; 16 July 1918; Gököz, Keles, Bursa, Ottoman Empire
- Died: 8 February 2015 (aged 96) İzmir, Turkey
- Genres: Turkish classical music
- Occupation: Singer-songwriter
- Years active: 1933–2006
- Labels: His Master's Voice; Odeon Records

Müzeyyen Senar (Turkish pronunciation: [myzejjen seˈnaɾ]; 16 July 1918 – 8 February 2015) was a Turkish classical music performer, known as the "Diva of the Republic".

== Early years ==
Müzeyyen Dombayoğlu was born in 1918 in the village of Gököz, in Keles district of Bursa Province, in the then Ottoman Empire. She had two elder brothers İsmet and Hilmi. Her mother Zehra used to sing Senar to sleep. At the age of five, she developed a stutter after returning from a wedding ceremony, which she thought was the result of fear, as she recalled. Her speech disorder lasted until adulthood, though, as is usually the case with performers, it did not affect her singing voice. At six years old, knowing most of the popular folk songs by heart, she sang at family gatherings and wedding ceremonies, to which her mother took her. In her early childhood, she ran away from her father's home in Bursa to Istanbul, where her mother lived. Her father had left his wife after a marriage of 25 years.

According to several claims by Turkish media, she was adopted by the Dombayoğlu family. She was born in the village of Hilmiye in İnegöl to ethnic Georgian parents. Her birth name was Zeliha Eren and her parents were Fatma and Reşit, who migrated from Batumi to İnegöl.

== Career ==
Senar began her musical career in 1931, entering the Anadolu Musiki Cemiyeti ("Anatolia Musical Association") in Üsküdar, where she was educated by kemenche virtuoso Kemal Niyazi Seyhun and oud player Hayriye. After starting to perform at Radio Istanbul of TRT, she became well known. In 1933 she debuted on stage in a summer talent show at one of the most important music halls in Istanbul. She continued her performances at other renowned music halls. Also in 1933, aged 15, she sang her first song on 78 rpm record released by His Master's Voice. More recordings followed later on Odeon Records and other labels. Her singing was also much admired by the founder of the Turkish Republic, Mustafa Kemal Atatürk (1881-1938). On several occasions she gave special concerts in his audience.

Following an offer of Mesut Cemil in 1938, she went to Ankara to perform at the newly established state-owned local radio station. In 1941 she returned to Istanbul to give concerts at various well-known night clubs. In 1947, Senar gave her first concert abroad in Paris, France at Le Lido. With her voice and style, she opened a new era of Turkish classical music. She retired from active singing in 1983, appearing in her final show in a popular music hall in Bebek, Istanbul.

In the 1940s Senar played the leading role in the movie Kerem ile Aslı. In the 1960s she was featured in the movies Ana Yüreği and Sevgili Hocam. Her 1976 film, Analar Ölmez is autobiographical. She dubbed Egyptian singer Umm Kulthum's songs in imported Arabic movies with songs specially composed for Turkish release.

== Later years and death ==
On 26 September 2006 it was reported that she suffered a cerebral infarction at her home in İzmir, which paralyzed her left side. In February 2008 it was reported that she had lost her voice. As of 2013, she was living with her daughter, Feraye Işıl, in Bodrum. Senar died on 8 February 2015, aged 96. She had been hospitalized with pneumonia at Ege University Hospital in İzmir. On 10 February, she was laid to rest in Zincirlikuyu Cemetery, following the religious service held at Bebek Mosque in Istanbul.

== Accolades ==
In 1998, she was awarded the State Artist Award, but she declined to accept it. With the initiative of her student, renowned Turkish classical music singer, Bülent Ersoy, an exhibition of photographs of her entitled "Cumhuriyetin Divası: Müzeyyen Senar" ("Müzeyyen Senar, the Diva of the Republic") was held in Ankara on 29 October 2009, the Republic Day of Turkey.

On 16 July 2018, Google celebrated her 100th birthday with a Google Doodle.

== Discography ==
Year	Album	Series
2008	Odeon Yılları 2	
2008	İkinci Dubleden Sonra	Archived Sounds "Efsane Sesler" (Legendary Songs)
2007	Atatürk'ün Sevdiği Şarkılar	
2006	Ne Yaptım	Archived Sounds "Efsane Sesler" (Legendary Songs)
2006	Ben Seni Unutmak İçin Sevmedim	Archived Sounds "Efsane Sesler" (Legendary Songs)
2006	Müzeyyen Senar Odeon Yılları	
2004	Bir Bahar Akşamı	Archived Sounds "Efsane Sesler" (Legendary Songs)
2001	En Son Okuduklarım	
1998	Müzeyyen Senar ile Bir Ömre Bedel	
1995	Akşam Oldu Hüzünlendim Ben Yine	
1991	Nostalji	
1990	Çilingir Sofrası 1990	
1990	Günay Sanat Geceleri	
1989	Çilingir Sofrası 1989	
1988	Ayrıldı Gönül	Archived Sounds "Efsane Sesler" (Legendary Songs)
1988	Yine Bir Sızı Var İçimde	Archived Sounds "Efsane Sesler" (Legendary Songs)
1986	Bilmem ki Sefa	
1983	Gelse O Şuh Meclise 2	
1979	Güller Arasında	Archived Sounds "Efsane Sesler" (Legendary Songs)
1979	Şarap Gibi	
1978	Çilingir Sofrası 1978	
1976	Gelse O Şuh Meclise	
1970	Son Veda	
	Son Aşkımı Canlandıran	Archived Sounds "Efsane Sesler" (Legendary Songs)
	Söyleyin Güneşe	Archived Sounds "Efsane Sesler" (Legendary Songs)
1989	Müzeyyen Senar'la Faslı Muhabbet	
1975	Gül Yüzlülerin Şevkine Gel	
1992	Meşk	
1969	Müzeyyen Senar	
1977	Müzeyyen Senar (1995)	
