= Khajag =

Khajag (Armenian: Խաժակ) is an Armenian given name and surname. Notable people with the name include:

- Khajag Barsamian, Armenian religious figure
- Karekin Khajag, Armenian journalist, writer, political activist, and educator
