= Selamlı =

Selamlı may refer to:

- Selamlı, Arapgir, Malatya Province, Turkey
- Selamlı, Mut, Mersin Province, Turkey
