= Kuyupınar =

Kuyupınar can refer to:

- Kuyupınar, Bozüyük
- Kuyupınar, Göynük
- Kuyupınar, Ilgaz
