= Belenören =

Belenören can refer to:

- Belenören, Keles
- Belenören, Nallıhan
