= Bozalan =

Bozalan can refer to the following villages in Turkey:

- Bozalan, Bozüyük
- Bozalan, Buldan
- Bozalan, Ezine
- Bozalan, Savaştepe
