= Akpınar, Bozüyük =

Akpınar
- Neighbourhood
- Location in Turkey Akpınar (Marmara)
- Coordinates: 39.8720°N 30.1044°E
- Country: Turkey
- Province: Bilecik
- District: Bozüyük
- Municipality: Bozüyük
- Population (2021): 494
- Time zone: UTC+3 (TRT)

Akpınar is a neighbourhood of the city Bozüyük, Bozüyük District, Bilecik Province, Turkey. Its population is 494 (2021).
