= Çaydere =

Çaydere can refer to:

- Çaydere, Bozüyük
- Çaydere, Pazaryolu
