= Dodurga, Bilecik =

Dodurga
- Municipality
- Location in Turkey Dodurga (Marmara)
- Coordinates: 39°48′N 29°55′E
- Country: Turkey
- Province: Bilecik
- District: Bozüyük
- Elevation: 1,110 m (3,640 ft)
- Population (2021): 2,000
- Time zone: UTC+3 (TRT)
- Postal code: 11440
- Area code: 0228

Dodurga is a town (belde) and municipality in the Bozüyük District, Bilecik Province, Turkey. Its population is 2,000 (2021). It is 17 kilometres (11 mi) south west of Bozüyük. According to legend, the name of the town refers to one of the sons of Oghuz Khan, i.e., Ayhan. The settlement was declared a seat of the township in 1958.
