= Muratdere, Bozüyük =

Muratdere
- Village
- Location within Turkey Location within Marmara
- Coordinates: 39°54′N 29°54′E
- Country: Turkey
- Province: Bilecik
- District: Bozüyük
- Population (2021): 192
- Time zone: UTC+3 (TRT)

Muratdere is a village in the Bozüyük District, Bilecik Province, Turkey. Its population is 192 (2021).
