= Bıyıklıalanı, Keles =

Village in Turkey

Bıyıklıalanı
- Neighbourhood
- Location in Turkey Bıyıklıalanı (Marmara)
- Coordinates: 39°55′N 29°12′E
- Country: Turkey
- Province: Bursa
- District: Keles
- Population (2022): 192
- Time zone: UTC+3 (TRT)

Bıyıklıalanı is a neighbourhood in the municipality and district of Keles, Bursa Province in Turkey. Its population is 192 (2022).

== History ==
The former name of the village was Bıyıkalan.
