= Yenidodurga, Bozüyük =

Yenidodurga
- Village
- Location within Turkey Location within Marmara
- Coordinates: 39°46′N 29°56′E
- Country: Turkey
- Province: Bilecik
- District: Bozüyük
- Population (2021): 75
- Time zone: UTC+3 (TRT)

Yenidodurga is a village in the Bozüyük District, Bilecik Province, Turkey. Its population is 75 (2021).
