= Kızıltepe, Bozüyük =

Kızıltepe
- Village
- Location within Turkey Location within Marmara
- Coordinates: 39.9421°N 30.0562°E
- Country: Turkey
- Province: Bilecik
- District: Bozüyük
- Population (2021): 29
- Time zone: UTC+3 (TRT)

Kızıltepe is a village in the Bozüyük District, Bilecik Province, Turkey. Its population is 29 (2021).
