= Arapgir =

- District and municipality
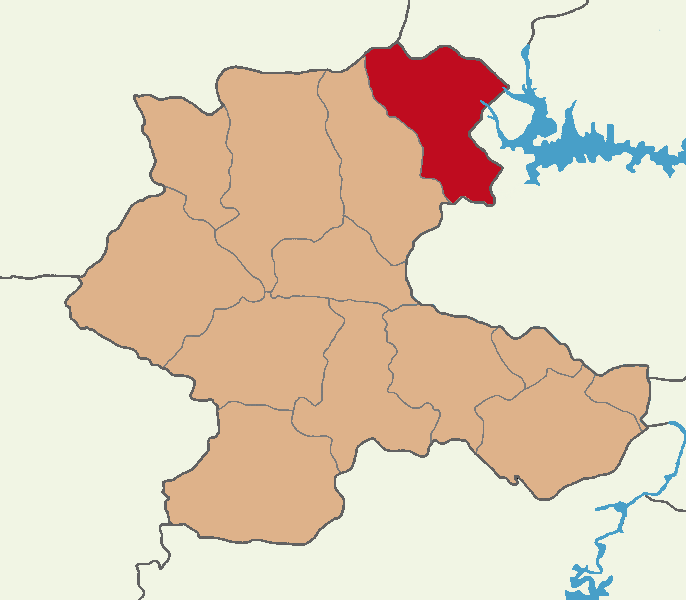
- Map showing Arapgir District in Malatya Province

- Location in Turkey
- Coordinates: 39°02′N 38°29′E
- Country: Turkey
- Province: Malatya

Government
  - Mayor: Haluk Cömertoğlu (CHP)
- Area: 987 km^{2} (381 sq mi)
- Population (2022): 9,964
  - Density: 10.1/km^{2} (26.1/sq mi)
- Time zone: UTC+3 (TRT)
- Postal code: 44800
- Area code: 0422
- Website: www.arapgir.bel.tr

Arapgir (Armenian: Արաբկիր; Kurdish: Erebgir) is a municipality and district of Malatya Province, Turkey. Its area is 987 km^{2}, and its population is 9,964 (2022).

It is situated at the confluence of the eastern and western Euphrates, but some miles from the right bank of the combined streams. Arapgir is connected with Sivas by a chaussée, prolonged to the Euphrates river. The present town was built in the mid-19th century, but about 2 miles north-east is the old town, now called Eskişehir ("old city" in Turkish).

== History ==
This territory is a part of historical Lesser Armenia. The old town of Arapgir was founded by the Armenian King Senekerim-Hovhannes Artsruni in 1021, who had exchanged his kingdom of Vaspurakan for estates in the central lands of the Byzantine Empire.

== Composition ==
There are 63 neighbourhoods in Arapgir District:

- Aktaş
- Alıçlı
- Aşağıçörenge
- Aşağıulupınar
- Aşağıyenice
- Berenge
- Boğazlı
- Bostancık
- Budak
- Çakırsu
- Çarşı
- Çaybaşı
- Çiğnir
- Çimen
- Çobanlı
- Cömertli
- Deregezen
- Düzce
- Esikli
- Eskiarapkir
- Eynir
- Gebeli
- Göz
- Gözeli
- Günyüzü
- Hezenek
- Hocaali
- Kayakesen
- Kaynak
- Kazanç
- Kılıçlı
- Konducak
- Koru
- Köseoğlu
- Mehmet Akif
- Meşeli
- Onar
- Ormansırtı
- Osmanpaşa
- Pacalı
- Pirali
- Şağıluşağı
- Sekizsu
- Selamlı
- Serge
- Şıhlar
- Sinikli
- Sipahiuşağı
- Suçeyin
- Sugeçti
- Tarhan
- Taşdelen
- Taşdibek
- Ulaçlı
- Yaylacık
- Yazılı
- Yeni
- Yeşilyayla
- Yukarı Ulupınar
- Yukarı Yenice
- Yukarıçörenge
- Yukarıyabanlı
- Zohrap

== Climate ==
Arapgir has a dry-summer humid continental climate (Köppen: Dsa), transitioning to a Mediterranean climate (Köppen: Csa) with hot, dry summers and cold, frequently snowy winters.

Climate data for Arapgir (1991–2020)
Month	Jan	Feb	Mar	Apr	May	Jun	Jul	Aug	Sep	Oct	Nov	Dec	Year
Mean daily maximum °C (°F)	2.7 (36.9)	4.4 (39.9)	10.1 (50.2)	16.3 (61.3)	21.7 (71.1)	27.7 (81.9)	32.4 (90.3)	33.0 (91.4)	28.1 (82.6)	20.8 (69.4)	11.9 (53.4)	5.0 (41.0)	17.9 (64.2)
Daily mean °C (°F)	−0.8 (30.6)	0.4 (32.7)	5.4 (41.7)	11.0 (51.8)	16.1 (61.0)	21.6 (70.9)	25.7 (78.3)	26.2 (79.2)	21.6 (70.9)	15.0 (59.0)	7.2 (45.0)	1.4 (34.5)	12.6 (54.7)
Mean daily minimum °C (°F)	−3.4 (25.9)	−2.5 (27.5)	1.8 (35.2)	6.7 (44.1)	11.3 (52.3)	16.2 (61.2)	20.1 (68.2)	20.7 (69.3)	16.2 (61.2)	10.5 (50.9)	3.7 (38.7)	−1.2 (29.8)	8.4 (47.1)
Average precipitation mm (inches)	100.67 (3.96)	86.87 (3.42)	79.16 (3.12)	80.47 (3.17)	66.4 (2.61)	16.8 (0.66)	3.18 (0.13)	2.13 (0.08)	13.08 (0.51)	49.2 (1.94)	75.21 (2.96)	97.59 (3.84)	670.76 (26.41)
Average precipitation days (≥ 1.0 mm)	9.6	8.7	9.1	9.4	9.0	3.4	2.0	1.8	2.6	5.8	6.8	9.6	77.8
Average relative humidity (%)	69.2	65.2	56.5	51.8	48.5	37.1	30.7	29.9	33.5	48.3	58.3	70.7	50.0
Source: NOAA

== Demographics ==
Arapgir town is populated by Kurds. In descending order of population, the district is populated by Turks, Kurds, and Armenians. Armenians used to be the second largest ethnic group after Turks, constituting one third of the population, but most of the population was wiped out during the Armenian genocide.

=== History ===
According to Donald Quataert, Arapgir in the 1880s was made up of 4,802 Muslim and 1,200 Armenian households, with a total population of about 29,000 persons. According to a METU study citing Nejat Göyünç, the city population was about 20,000 in 1911, of which more than half of the population was Armenian Christians and the rest were Muslim. Differing sources present differing pictures for the respective shares of ethnicities within the weavers' community. The Armenian population is reported to have suffered severely during the Hamidian massacres of 1895, although, in this regard, Donald Quataert notes, with textile exports back to normal levels a year after the turmoil, in 1896, either all weavers were Muslims after all, or few Armenian weavers were killed, displaced or disrupted during the troubles.

On the eve of World War I, there were about 9,523 Armenians (1,300 houses) and 6,774 Turks living in Arapgir. After the 1915 Armenian genocide, most of the Armenian population of Arapgir was killed or deported.

== Churches, mosques and other buildings ==
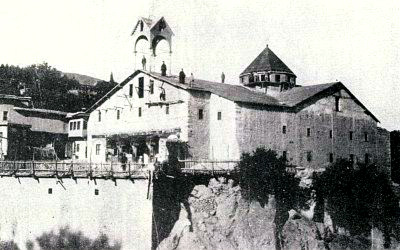
Armenian Cathedral of Arapgir.

Before the Armenian genocide Arapgir had seven Armenian Apostolic churches: Surp Astvadzadzin (Holy Mother of God) Church, not to be confused with the cathedral, Grigor Lusavorich (Gregory the Illuminator) Church, Surp Kevork Church, Surp Hagob Church, Surp Nshan Church, Surp Pilibos Arakel (St. Philip the Apostle) Church, Surp Sarkis Church, There were, also, one Catholic Surp Prgich (Holy Saviors) Church and one Protestant Cuğran Church. There were also more than 10 schools in the town. Little is left of pre-war Arapgir, but there are still some old houses that have survived, which are Armenian origin. The town also contains the ruins of a castle, several Seljuk mosques, old cemetery and silver mines.

== People from Arapgir ==
- Abdullah Cevdet
- Aram Achekbashian (1867–1915), Hnchak politician
- Cemal Azmi (1868–1922), Ottoman politician
- Vahagn Davtyan, (1922–1996), an Armenian writer
- Khajag Barsamian, born 1951, the primate of Diocese of Armenian Church of Eastern America
- Zehra Bilir (1913–2007), born Eliz Surhantakyan, Turkish folk singer of Armenian origin, known as "Türkü Ana" (Mother of Folk Songs)

== See also ==
- Arabkir District (Yerevan)
