= Sipahiuşağı, Arapgir =

Village in Turkey

Sipahiuşağı
- Neighbourhood
- Location in Turkey
- Coordinates: 38.825°N 38.447°E
- Country: Turkey
- Province: Malatya
- District: Arapgir
- Population (2025): 75
- Time zone: UTC+3 (TRT)

Sipahiuşağı is a neighbourhood in the municipality and district of Arapgir, Malatya Province in Turkey. It is populated by Kurds and had a population of 75 in 2025.
