= Düzdağ, Bozüyük =

Düzdağ
- Village
- Location within Turkey Location within Marmara
- Coordinates: 39.9389°N 30.1413°E
- Country: Turkey
- Province: Bilecik
- District: Bozüyük
- Population (2021): 94
- Time zone: UTC+3 (TRT)

Düzdağ is a village in the Bozüyük District, Bilecik Province, Turkey. Its population is 94 (2021).
