= Avdan, Keles =

Village in Turkey

Avdan
- Neighbourhood
- Location in Turkey Avdan (Marmara)
- Coordinates: 39.7786°N 29.2037°E
- Country: Turkey
- Province: Bursa
- District: Keles
- Population (2022): 106
- Time zone: UTC+3 (TRT)

Avdan is a neighbourhood in the municipality and district of Keles, Bursa Province in Turkey. Its population is 106 (2022).
