= Revnak, Bozüyük =

Revnak
- Village
- Location within Turkey Location within Marmara
- Coordinates: 39°52′N 29°56′E
- Country: Turkey
- Province: Bilecik
- District: Bozüyük
- Population (2021): 18
- Time zone: UTC+3 (TRT)

Revnak is a village in the Bozüyük District, Bilecik Province, Turkey. Its population is 18 (2021).
