= Zehra Bilir =

Turkish folk singer (1913–2007)

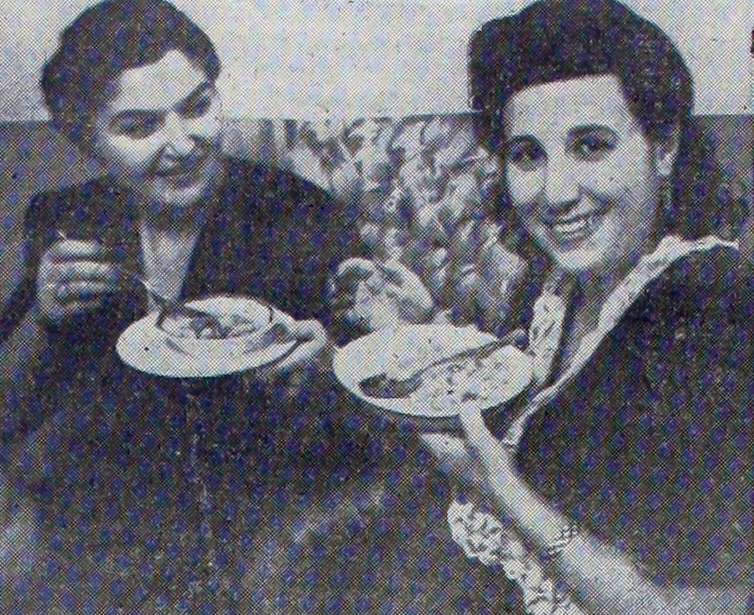
- Zehra Bilir (left) with Müzeyyen Senar (1950)

Background information
- Born: Eliz Surhantakyan; 26 March 1913; Arapgir, Ottoman Empire
- Died: 28 June 2007 (aged 94) Istanbul, Turkey
- Genres: Turkish folk music

Zehra Bilir (March 26, 1913, in Arapgir, Ottoman Empire – June 28, 2007, in Istanbul, Turkey) was a renowned Turkish folk singer of Armenian descent. She was known as the Edith Piaf of Turkey.

== Life ==
Zehra Bilir was born Eliz Surhantakyan in Arapgir. In an article published in the Armenian newspaper Agos, it was suggested that Zehra Bilir's real Armenian name was Eliza Ölçüyan. Her father Harutyun, went to fight for the Ottoman Empire during the First World War but has never returned. Eliz had two sisters and a brother who her mother couldn't look after on her own. Therefore, her mother married a Turkish man and Eliz always believed that her step-father was in fact her real father. Her Turkish father gave her the name Zehra which she believed was her real name during her adolescence. But in an interview on Sabah (newspaper) she said that she changed her name when she was 22 when she married her second husband. This eventually became the name she was known by. After receiving her primary school education at the local elementary school, she and her family moved to Istanbul in 1927. After working alongside a hatter, she then began to take musical notation and solfeggio lessons from famed Armenian musician Artaki Candan-Terzian.

== Death ==
Zehra Bilir died on June 28, 2007, at the age 94 years in a nursing home. She is buried in Zincirlikuyu Cemetery.
