= Kovalıca, Bozüyük =

Kovalıca
- Village
- Location within Turkey Location within Marmara
- Coordinates: 39°51′N 30°03′E
- Country: Turkey
- Province: Bilecik
- District: Bozüyük
- Population (2021): 174
- Time zone: UTC+3 (TRT)

Kovalıca is a village in the Bozüyük District, Bilecik Province, Turkey. Its population is 174 (2021).
