= Baraklı, Keles =

Village in Turkey

Baraklı
- Neighbourhood
- Location in Turkey Baraklı (Marmara)
- Coordinates: 39.9688°N 29.2270°E
- Country: Turkey
- Province: Bursa
- District: Keles
- Population (2022): 548
- Time zone: UTC+3 (TRT)

Baraklı is a neighbourhood in the municipality and district of Keles, Bursa Province in Turkey. Its population is 548 (2022).
