= Kozpınar, Bozüyük =

Kozpınar
- Village
- Location within Turkey Location within Marmara
- Country: Turkey
- Province: Bilecik
- District: Bozüyük
- Population (2021): 87
- Time zone: UTC+3 (TRT)

Kozpınar is a village in the Bozüyük District, Bilecik Province, Turkey. Its population is 87 (2021).
