= Yaylacık, Arapgir =

Village in Turkey

Yaylacık
- Neighbourhood
- Location in Turkey
- Coordinates: 39.085°N 38.532°E
- Country: Turkey
- Province: Malatya
- District: Arapgir
- Population (2025): 131
- Time zone: UTC+3 (TRT)

Yaylacık (Kurdish: Şepik) is a neighbourhood in the municipality and district of Arapgir, Malatya Province in Turkey. It is populated by Kurds of the Parçikan and Reşwan tribes and had a population of 131 in 2025.
