= Erikli, Bozüyük =

Erikli
- Village
- Location within Turkey Location within Marmara
- Coordinates: 39.8494°N 29.8661°E
- Country: Turkey
- Province: Bilecik
- District: Bozüyük
- Population (2021): 68
- Time zone: UTC+3 (TRT)

Erikli is a village in the Bozüyük District, Bilecik Province, Turkey. Its population is 68 (2021).
