= Delielmacık, Bozüyük =

Delielmacık
- Village
- Location within Turkey Location within Marmara
- Coordinates: 39°55′N 29°53′E
- Country: Turkey
- Province: Bilecik
- District: Bozüyük
- Population (2021): 31
- Time zone: UTC+3 (TRT)

Delielmacık is a village in the Bozüyük District, Bilecik Province, Turkey. Its population is 31 (2021).
