= Darıdere, Bozüyük =

Darıdere
- Village
- Location within Turkey Location within Marmara
- Coordinates: 39.8085°N 29.9925°E
- Country: Turkey
- Province: Bilecik
- District: Bozüyük
- Population (2021): 167
- Time zone: UTC+3 (TRT)

Darıdere is a village in the Bozüyük District, Bilecik Province, Turkey. Its population is 167 (2021).
