= Deregezen, Arapgir =

Village in Turkey

Deregezen
- Neighbourhood
- Location in Turkey
- Coordinates: 38.810°N 38.531°E
- Country: Turkey
- Province: Malatya
- District: Arapgir
- Population (2025): 86
- Time zone: UTC+3 (TRT)

Deregezen (Kurdish: Buban) is a neighbourhood in the municipality and district of Arapgir, Malatya Province in Turkey. It is populated by Kurds of the Atma tribe and had a population of 86 in 2025.
