= Günyarık, Bozüyük =

Günyarık
- Village
- Location within Turkey Location within Marmara
- Coordinates: 39°57′N 30°06′E
- Country: Turkey
- Province: Bilecik
- District: Bozüyük
- Population (2021): 84
- Time zone: UTC+3 (TRT)

Günyarık is a village in the Bozüyük District, Bilecik Province, Turkey. Its population is 84 (2021).
