= Eceköy, Bozüyük =

Eceköy
- Village
- Location within Turkey Location within Marmara
- Coordinates: 39°44′N 29°59′E
- Country: Turkey
- Province: Bilecik
- District: Bozüyük
- Population (2021): 32
- Time zone: UTC+3 (TRT)

Eceköy (also: Ece) is a village in the Bozüyük District, Bilecik Province, Turkey. Its population is 32 (2021).
