= Kandilli, Bozüyük =

Kandilli
- Village
- Location within Turkey Location within Marmara
- Country: Turkey
- Province: Bilecik
- District: Bozüyük
- Population (2021): 306
- Time zone: UTC+3 (TRT)

Kandilli is a village in the Bozüyük District, Bilecik Province, Turkey. Its population is 306 (2021).
