= Aksutekke, Bozüyük =

Aksutekke
- Village
- Location within Turkey Location within Marmara
- Coordinates: 39°55′N 29°49′E
- Country: Turkey
- Province: Bilecik
- District: Bozüyük
- Population (2021): 74
- Time zone: UTC+3 (TRT)

Aksutekke is a village in the Bozüyük District, Bilecik Province, Turkey. Its population is 74 (2021).
