= Onar, Arapgir =

Village in Turkey

Onar
- Neighbourhood
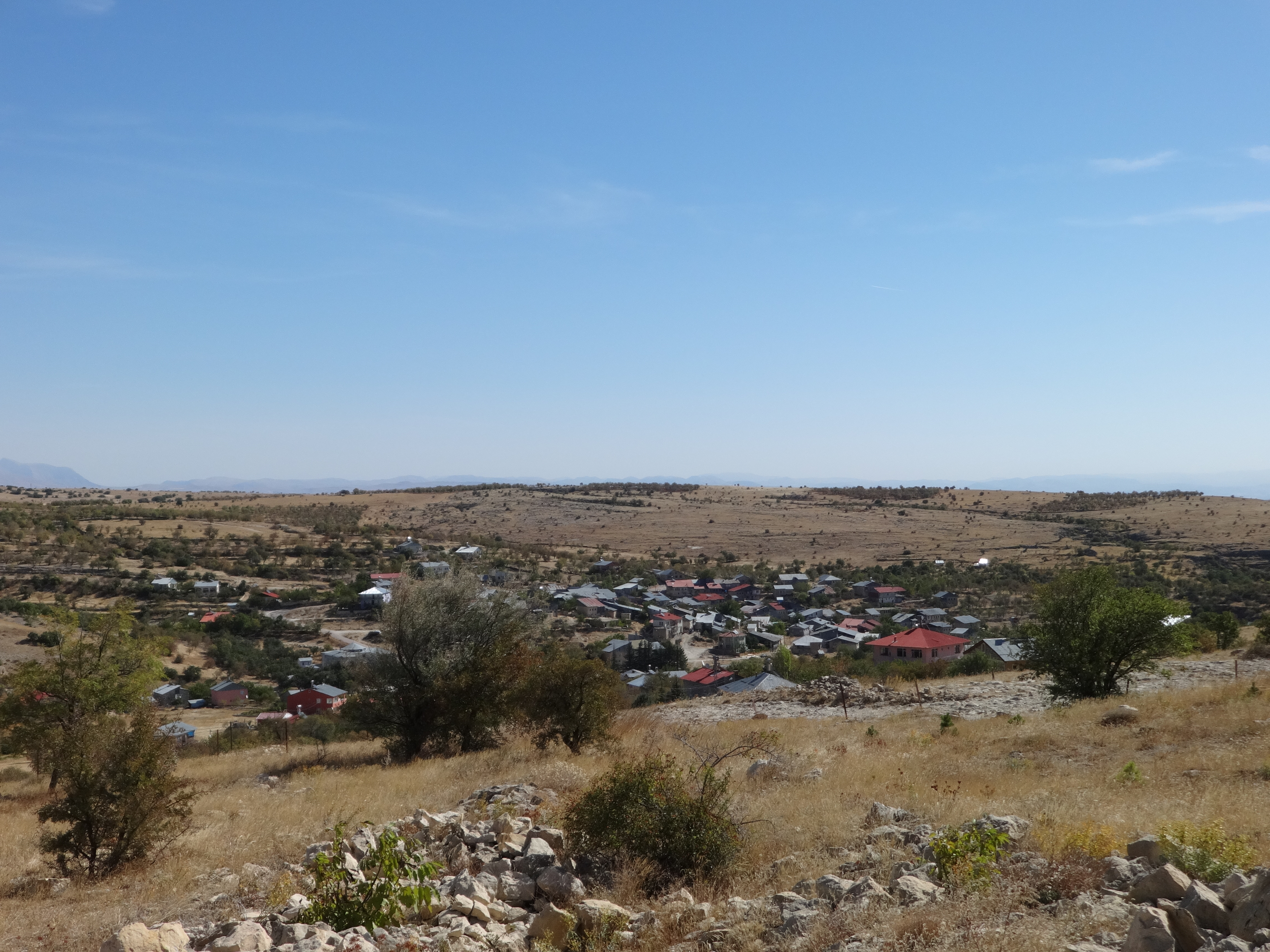

- Location within Turkey
- Coordinates: 38.968°N 38.569°E
- Country: Turkey
- Province: Malatya
- District: Arapgir
- Population (2025): 147
- Time zone: UTC+3 (TRT)

Onar is a neighbourhood in the municipality and district of Arapgir, Malatya Province in Turkey. It is populated by Turks and had a population of 147 in 2025.
