= Osmaniye, Bozüyük =

Osmaniye
- Village
- Location within Turkey Location within Marmara
- Country: Turkey
- Province: Bilecik
- District: Bozüyük
- Population (2021): 111
- Time zone: UTC+3 (TRT)

Osmaniye is a village in the Bozüyük District, Bilecik Province, Turkey. Its population is 111 (2021).
