= Dübekli, Bozüyük =

Dübekli
- Village
- Location within Turkey Location within Marmara
- Country: Turkey
- Province: Bilecik
- District: Bozüyük
- Population (2021): 166
- Time zone: UTC+3 (TRT)

Dübekli is a village in the Bozüyük District, Bilecik Province, Turkey. Its population is 166 (2021).
