= Cihangazi =

- Village
- Location within Turkey Location within Marmara
- Coordinates: 39°44′N 29°55′E
- Country: Turkey
- Province: Bilecik
- District: Bozüyük
- Elevation: 1,130 m (3,710 ft)
- Population (2021): 279
- Time zone: UTC+3 (TRT)
- Postal code: 11440
- Area code: 0228

Cihangazi is a village in the Bozüyük District, Bilecik Province, Turkey. Its population is 279 (2021). Before the 2013 reorganisation, it was a town (belde). It is 30 kilometres (19 mi) south of Bozüyük. The name of the village probably refers to an undated tombstone of a certain war hero named Cihangazi (literally "World veteran"). Cihangazi was a more populous town in the past and its population is decreasing because of migration to cities.
