= Sugeçti, Arapgir =

Village in Turkey

Sugeçti
- Neighbourhood
- Location in Turkey
- Coordinates: 39.043°N 38.300°E
- Country: Turkey
- Province: Malatya
- District: Arapgir
- Population (2025): 64
- Time zone: UTC+3 (TRT)

Sugeçti is a neighbourhood in the municipality and district of Arapgir, Malatya Province in Turkey. It is populated by Kurds of the Atma tribe and had a population of 64 in 2025.
