= Aktaş, Arapgir =

Village in Turkey

Aktaş
- Neighbourhood
- Location in Turkey
- Coordinates: 38.934°N 38.469°E
- Country: Turkey
- Province: Malatya
- District: Arapgir
- Population (2025): 159
- Time zone: UTC+3 (TRT)

Aktaş is a neighbourhood in the municipality and district of Arapgir, Malatya Province in Turkey. It is populated by Turks and had a population of 159 in 2025.
