= Karaçayır, Bozüyük =

Karaçayır
- Village
- Location within Turkey Location within Marmara
- Coordinates: 39.7204°N 29.9614°E
- Country: Turkey
- Province: Bilecik
- District: Bozüyük
- Population (2021): 25
- Time zone: UTC+3 (TRT)

Karaçayır is a village in the Bozüyük District, Bilecik Province, Turkey. Its population is 25 (2021).
