= Ketenlik, Bozüyük =

Ketenlik
- Village
- Location within Turkey Location within Marmara
- Coordinates: 39.7189°N 29.8085°E
- Country: Turkey
- Province: Bilecik
- District: Bozüyük
- Population (2021): 27
- Time zone: UTC+3 (TRT)

Ketenlik is a village in the Bozüyük District, Bilecik Province, Turkey. Its population is 27 (2021).
