= Harmanalanı, Keles =

Village in Turkey

Harmanalanı
- Neighbourhood
- Location in Turkey Harmanalanı (Marmara)
- Coordinates: 39°55′N 29°11′E
- Country: Turkey
- Province: Bursa
- District: Keles
- Population (2022): 164
- Time zone: UTC+3 (TRT)

Harmanalanı is a neighbourhood in the municipality and district of Keles, Bursa Province in Turkey. Its population is 164 (2022).
