= Poyra, Bozüyük =

Poyra Хьатыкъуайхьаблэ Хьатыкъуай
- Village
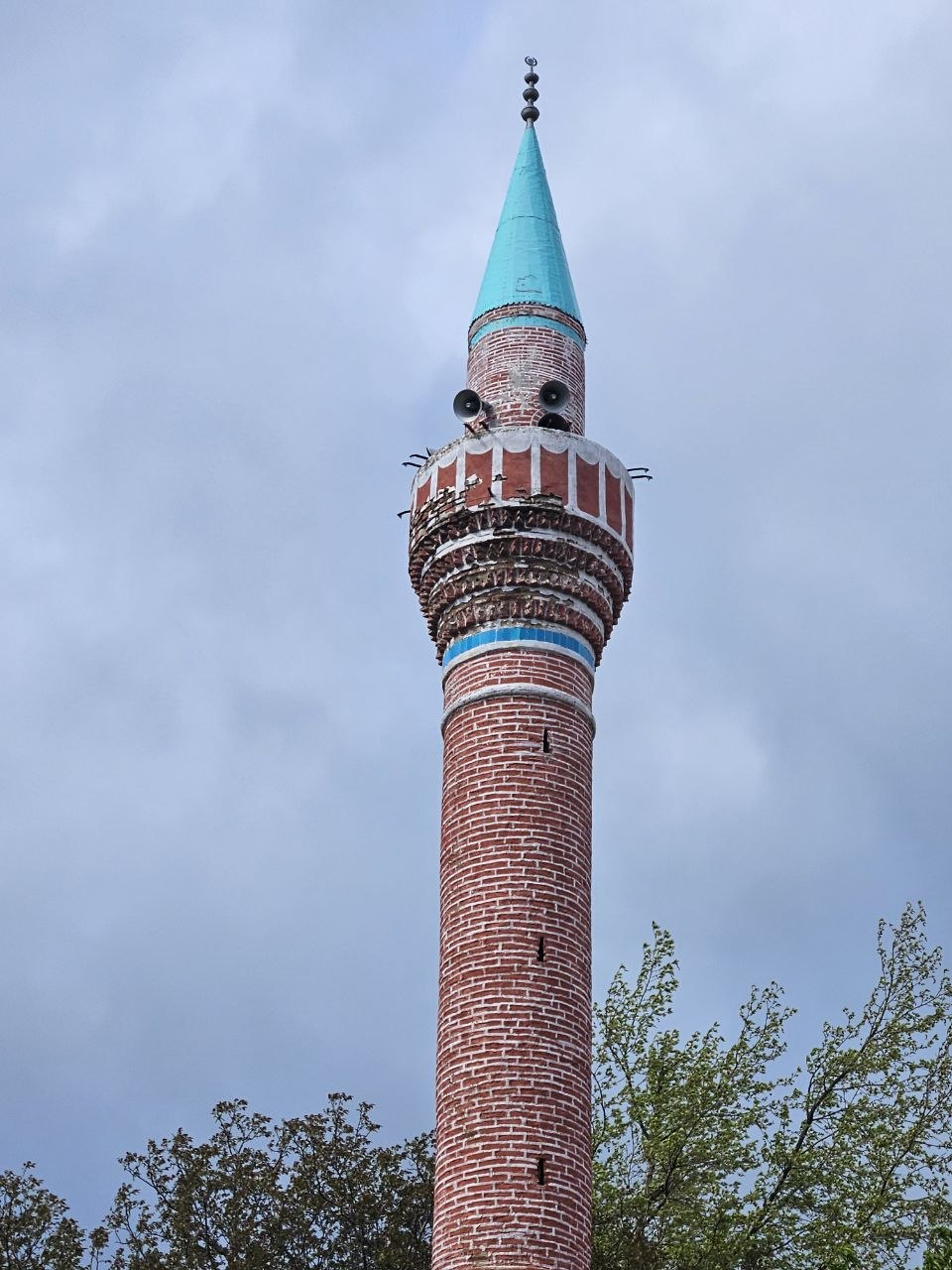
- Minaret of the village's mosque

- Location within Turkey Location within Marmara
- Coordinates: 39°52′N 30°12′E
- Country: Turkey
- Province: Bilecik
- District: Bozüyük
- Established: 1881
- Population (2024): 128
- Time zone: UTC+3 (TRT)
- Postal code: 11302
- Name meaning: Wheel hub (Poyra); Hatuqay village (Hatuqayhable)

Poyra, known locally as Hatukay or Hatukayhable (Adyghe: Хьатыкъуайхьаблэ, Хьатыкъуай) is a village in the Bozüyük District, Bilecik Province, Turkey. Its population is 128 (2024). The village mainly consists of Circassian people of the Hatuqay tribe. The village is known for a cultural statue featuring a traditional Circassian table.

== History ==
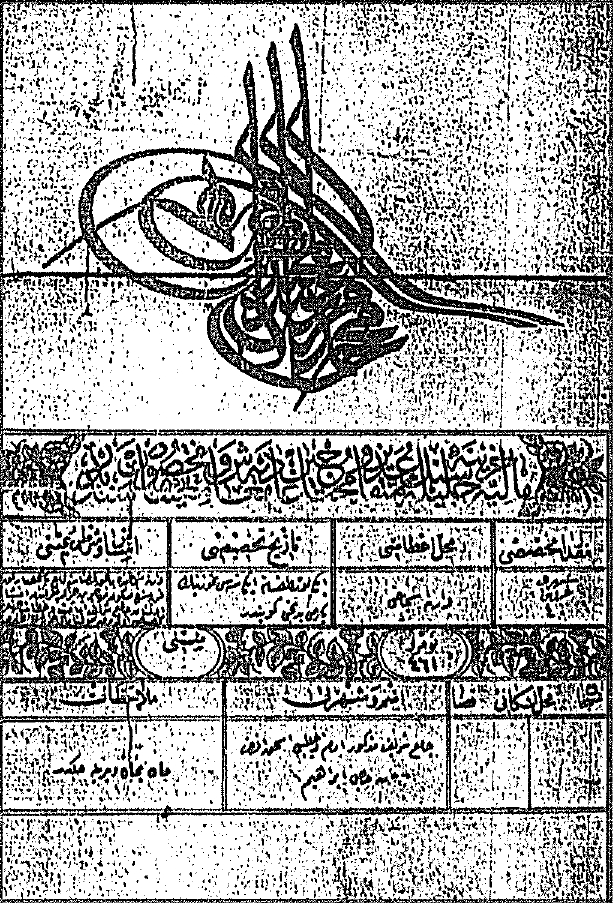
From the Ottoman archives: the imam certificate of Effendi Yeshgarqo Yishaq, among the founders of Poyra.

=== Exile of the Hatuqay tribe ===
The founders of the village were originally from the Hatuqay Principality of Circassia, many of them from a village known as Hanapshekhabl (Adyghe: Хьанапщэхьаблэ) and its surrounding villages. The Hatuqay, like other Circassians, were affected by the Russo-Circassian War, and the Circassian genocide as part of it. Circassian villages were systematically destroyed and their inhabitants killed as part of Russian military plans, and the Circassians increasingly had little power to resist. In June 1851, the ruler of the Hatuqay Principality, prince Jandjeriy Cherchanuqo, contacted Russian General Zavodovsky, who was infamous among Russian ranks for his "good nature", proposing ceasefire in return for the Hatuqay people being spared. General Zavodovsky agreed to these demands, a decision that conflicted with the intentions of his superiors, who wanted the area cleared of Circassians. Jandjeriy's successor, prince Indar Cherchanuqo, kept the ceasefire. Despite this, in October 1854, Russian forces attacked the Hatuqay region, destroying the prince's village and razing the Hatuqay lands, systematically burning massive supplies of hay, grain, and winter provisions. Othet Hatuqay villages were also located and bunt. In 1863, the surviving Hatuqay were divided into small groups and forcibly resettled into large villages created for the Bzhedug tribe. The Hatuqay population was dispersed, the tribe effectively disappeared from the map. A large number were exiled to the Ottoman Empire, including in Bulgaria.

=== Foundation of Poyra ===
During the initial great exodus, the founders of the village traveled via steamships and sailboats, disembarking at the pier of the Balçık district in the Varna Sanjak, located in present-day Bulgaria. They settled in Başsağlık Village, where they lived for 17 years. There was an estimated number of 150,000 Circassians in Bulgaria.

During the 1877-78 Russo-Turkish War, the Circassians were used by the Turkish army as irregular cavalry units. In the summer of 1877, mainly Circassian irregular cavalry participated on the Turkish side in the battle for Nova Zagora. The Circassians in Bulgaria fiercely opposed the Bulgarian Revolt in 1876; Kosovo Circassians also joined the Bulgarian Circassians. European countries in turn demanded that the Circassians leave the region. Thus, following the Ottoman Empire's defeat in the 1877-1878 Ottoman-Russian War, this community was subjected to a second forced displacement. Fleeing the advancing forces, they traveled overland between 1878 and 1881 and initially attempted to settle in the vicinity of İnegöl. The immigrants struggled to adapt to the specific climate of the İnegöl region, which prompted them to relocate once more. In 1881, they moved to the Bilecik province and officially founded Poyra Village within the Bozüyük district.

The village was originally named as Hatuqayhable, named after the Hatuqay tribe and Hatuqay Principality, where the inhabitants traced their descent from. However, during the first three decades of the Republic, efforts to Turkify geographical names were a recurring theme. Non-Turkish and "ugly" place and village names, including Circassian ones, were changed. Following the establishment of the Turkish Republic, in 1928, the official name of the village was designated as "Poyra", which means "wheel hub" in Turkish.

== Culture ==
The village mainly observes Circassian customs. There are also Balkan Turks in the village, who in addition to Rumelian Turkish also speak Adyghe.

== Notable people ==
- Şamil Çinaz - professional footballer
- Mesut Bakkal - professional football coach

== Images ==
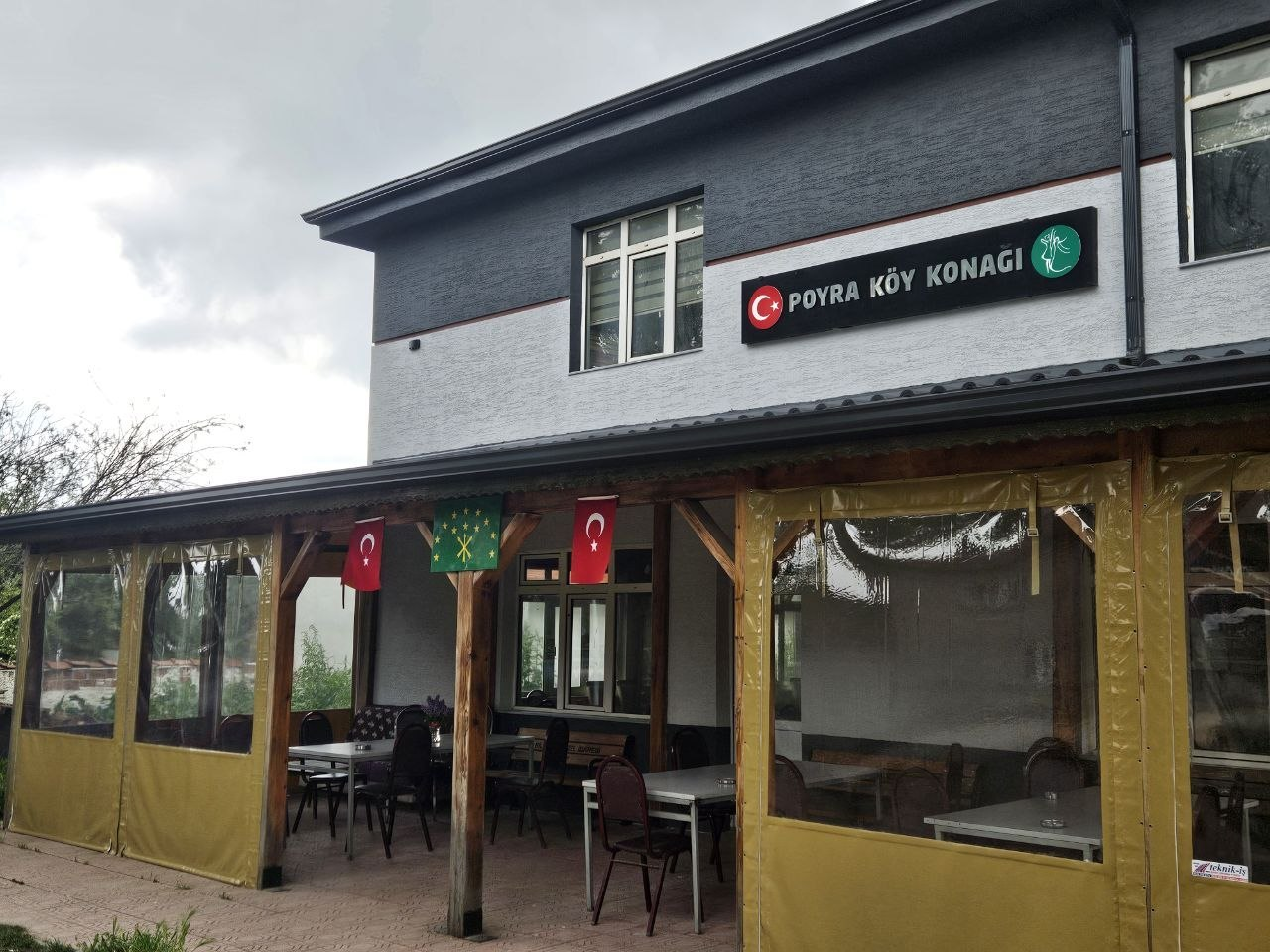
Village center

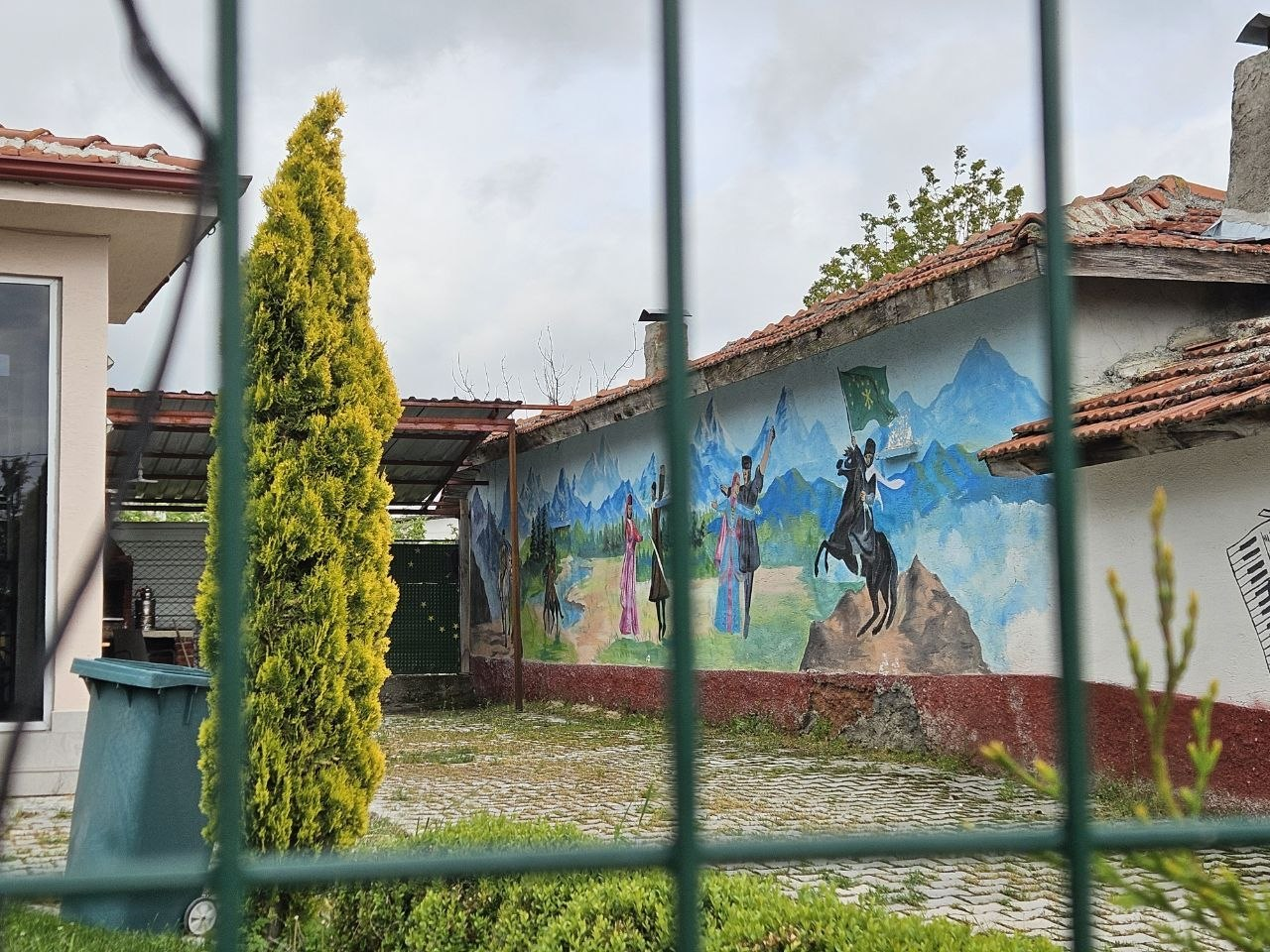
Circassian themed walls in the village

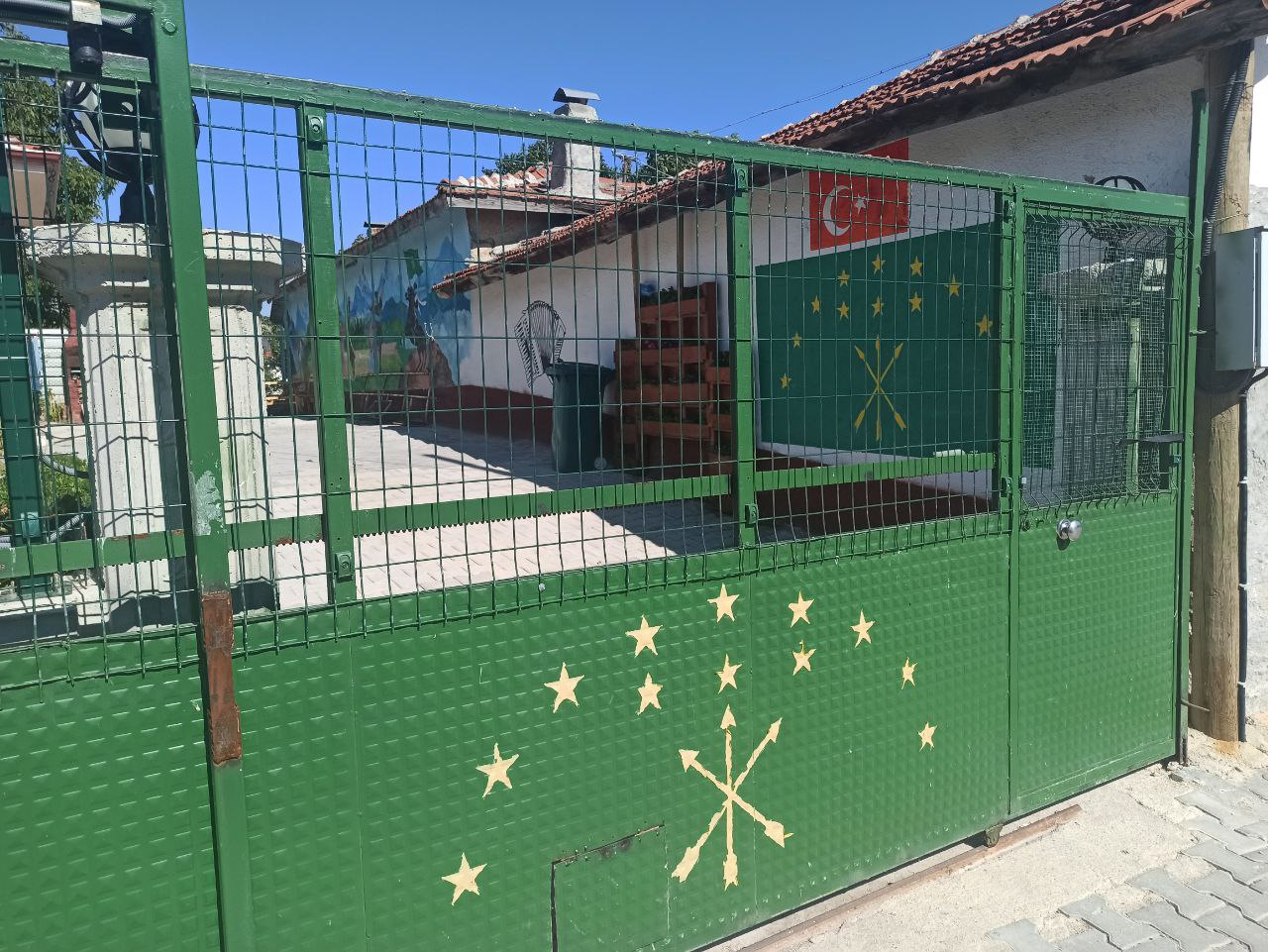
A door in the village

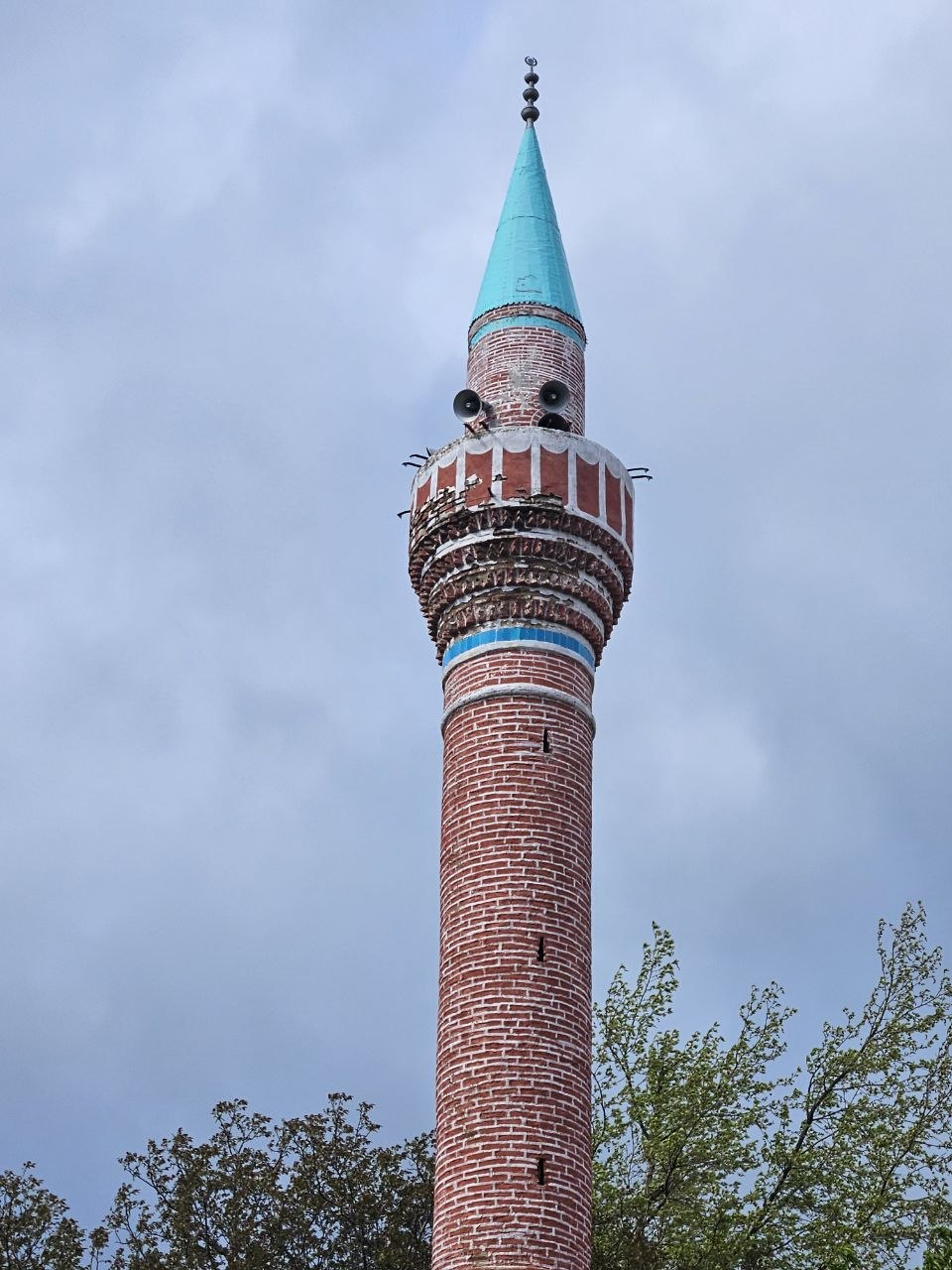
Minaret of the village mosque

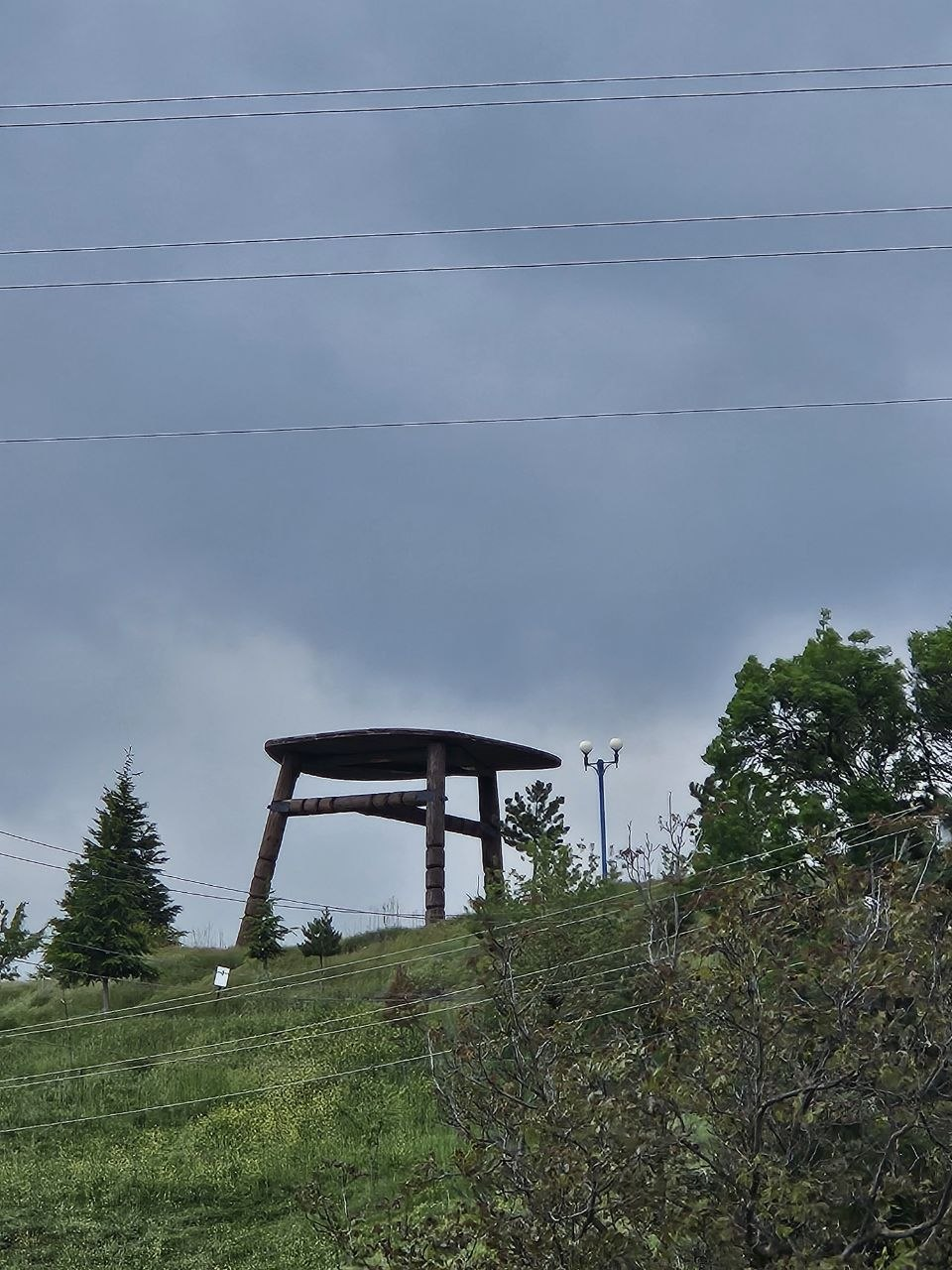
Statue of a traditional Circassian table in the village

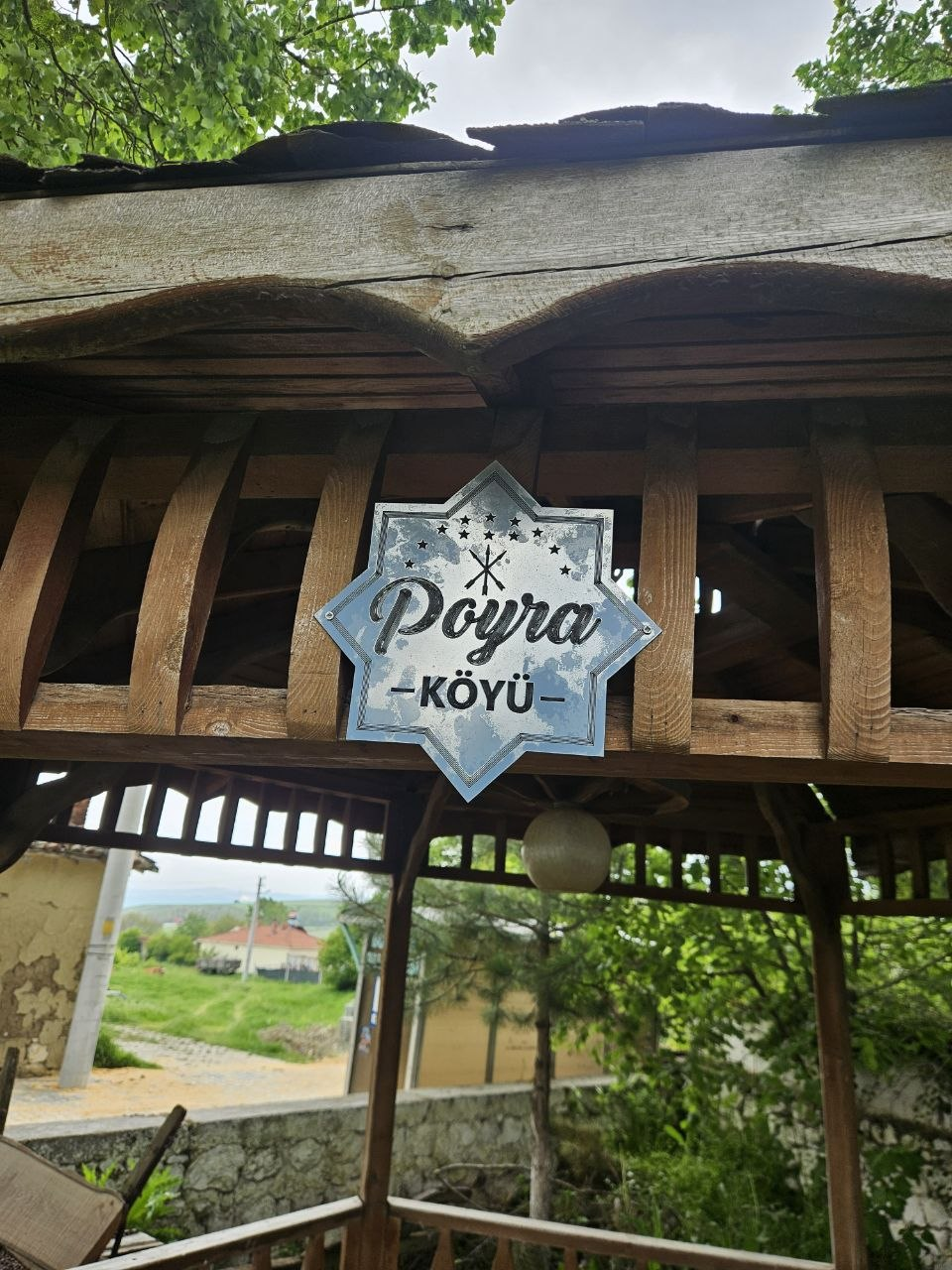
The village logo

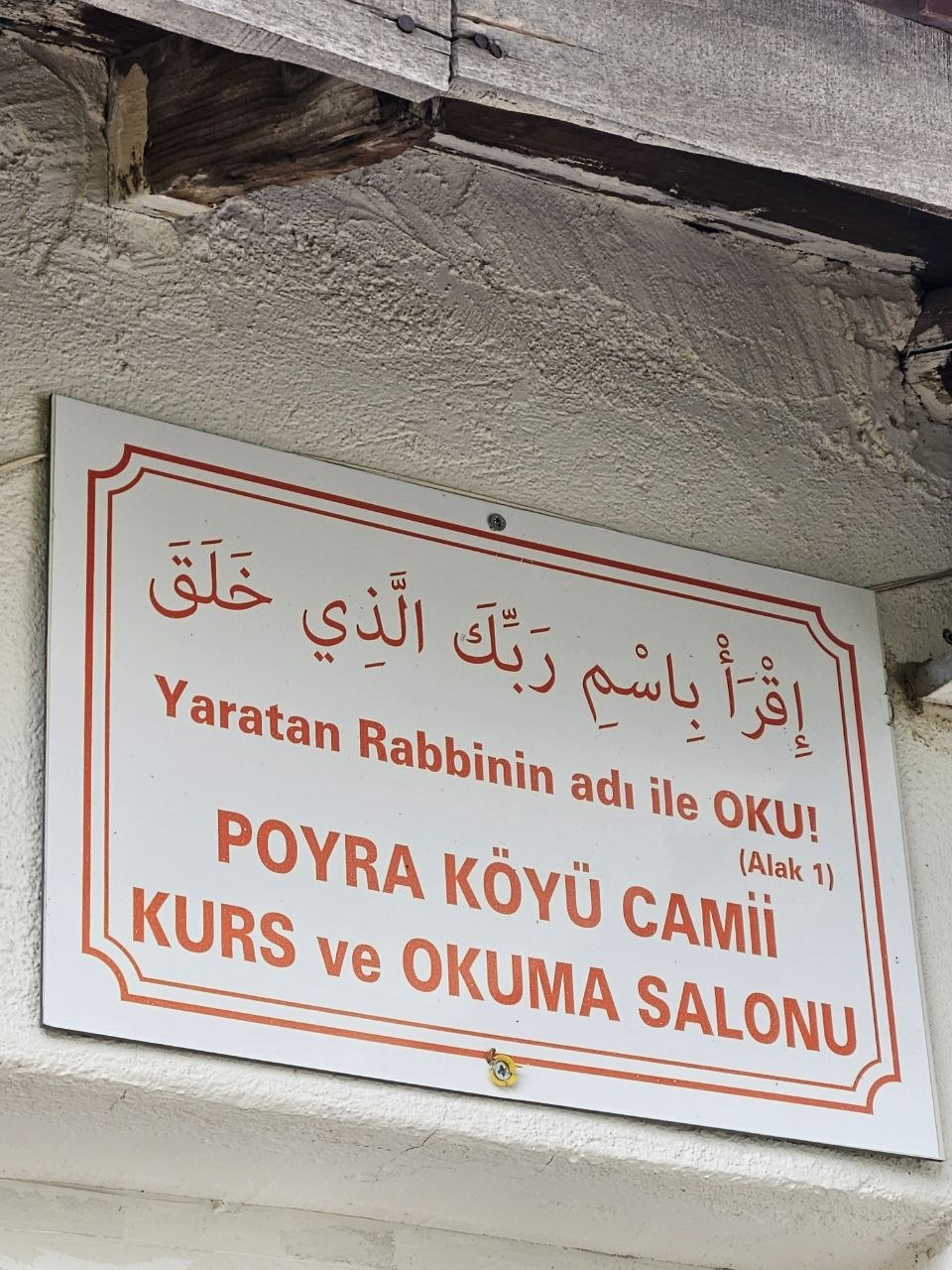
Sign in the village displaying a Quran verse (96:1)

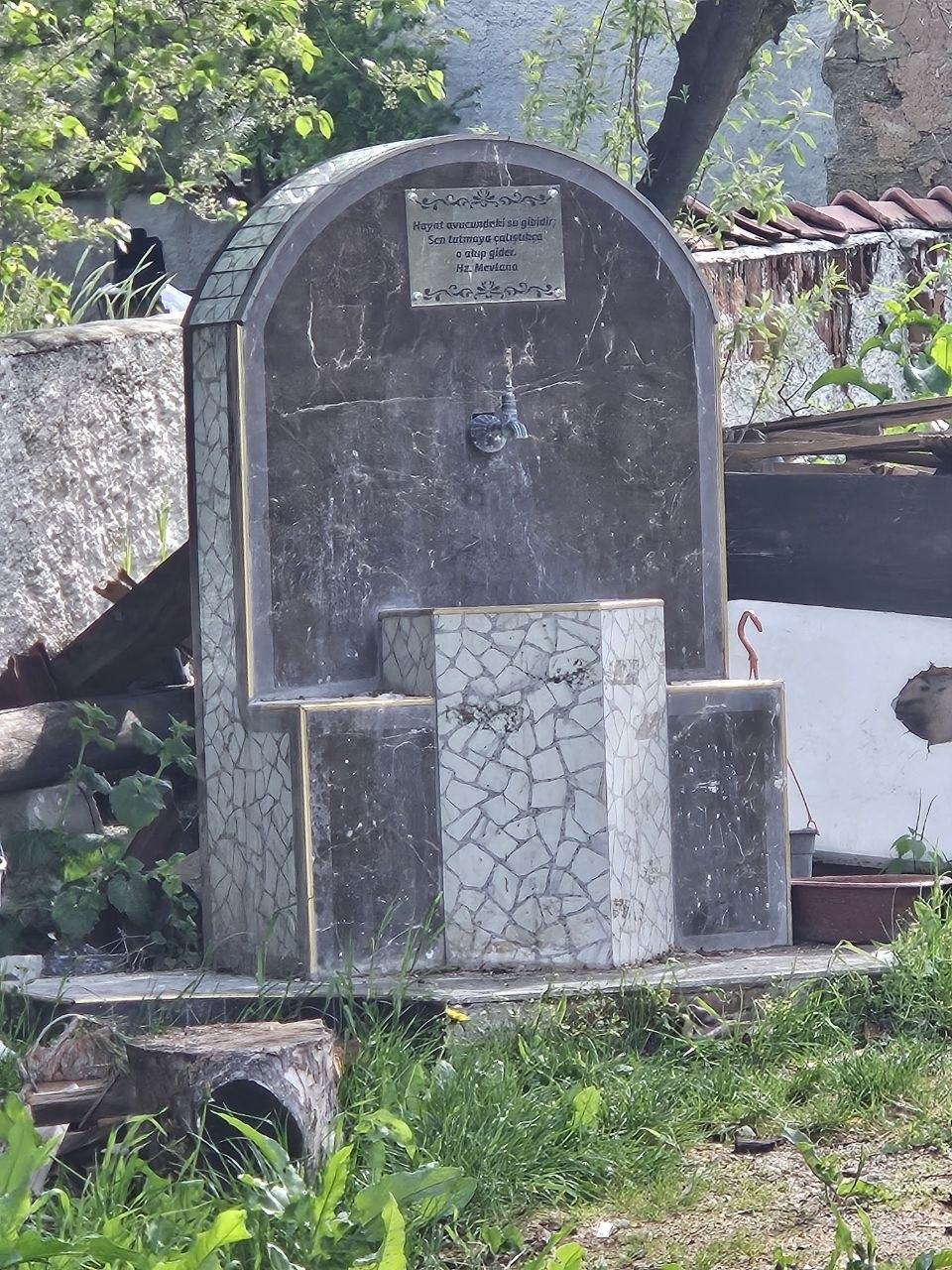
A fountain in the village displaying a quote attributed to Rumi: "Life is like water in your palm; the more you try to hold onto it, the more it flows away."

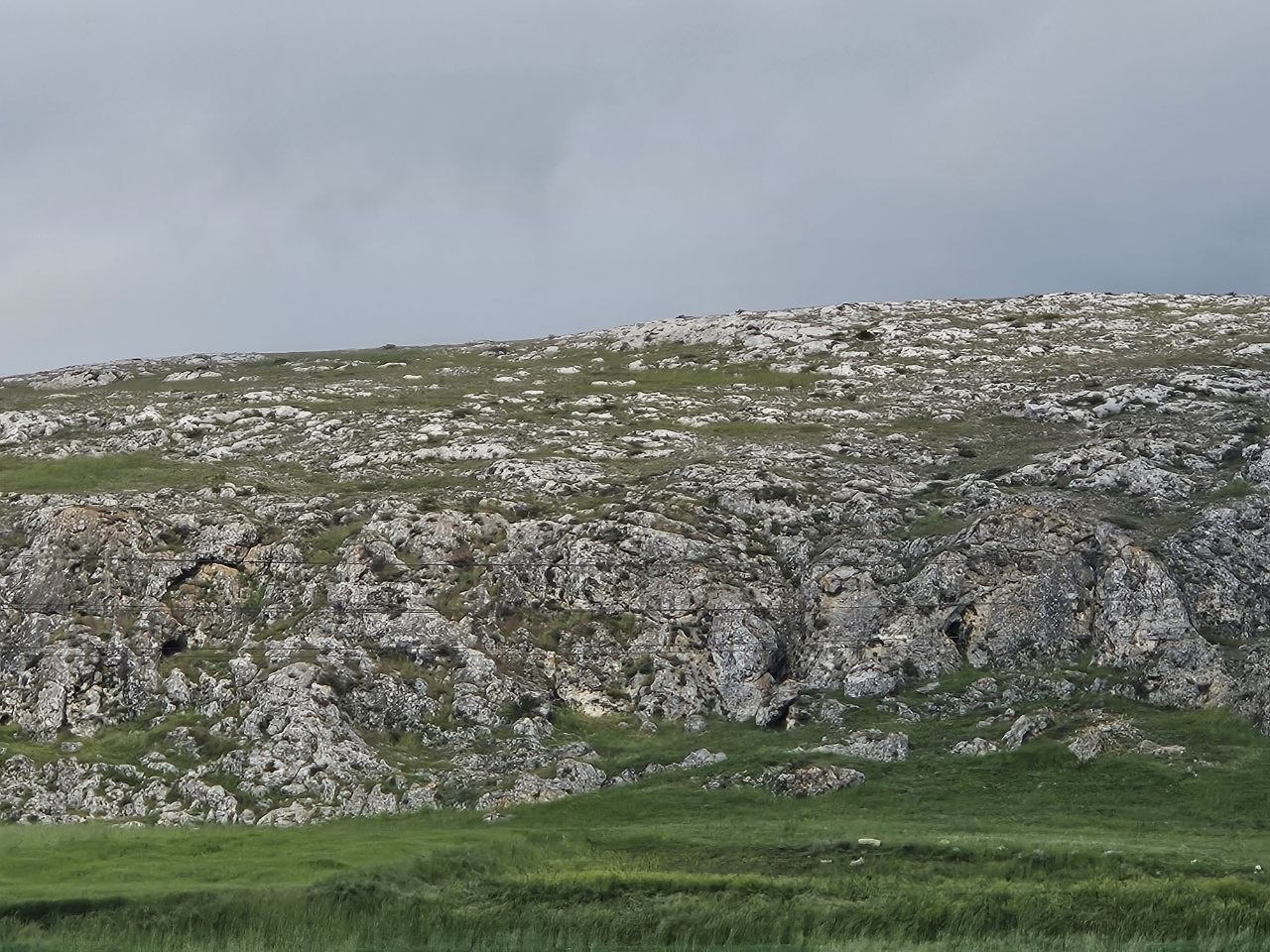
Terrain near the village
