= Günyüzü, Arapgir =

Village in Turkey

Günyüzü
- Neighbourhood
- Location in Turkey
- Coordinates: 38.9810°N 38.470°E
- Country: Turkey
- Province: Malatya
- District: Arapgir
- Population (2025): 119
- Time zone: UTC+3 (TRT)

Günyüzü is a neighbourhood in the municipality and district of Arapgir, Malatya Province in Turkey. It is populated by Turks and had a population of 119 in 2025.
