= Harmancık Demirci, Keles =

Village in Turkey

Harmancık Demirci
- Neighbourhood
- Country: Turkey
- Province: Bursa
- District: Keles
- Population (2022): 154
- Time zone: UTC+3 (TRT)

Harmancık Demirci is a neighbourhood in the municipality and district of Keles, Bursa Province in Turkey. Its population is 154 (2022).
