= Dombayçayırı, Bozüyük =

Dombayçayırı
- Village
- Location within Turkey Location within Marmara
- Coordinates: 39°45′N 29°46′E
- Country: Turkey
- Province: Bilecik
- District: Bozüyük
- Population (2021): 53
- Time zone: UTC+3 (TRT)

Dombayçayırı is a village in the Bozüyük District, Bilecik Province, Turkey. Its population is 53 (2021).
