= Yeşilçukurca, Bozüyük =

Yeşilçukurca
- Village
- Location within Turkey Location within Marmara
- Coordinates: 39°44′N 29°51′E
- Country: Turkey
- Province: Bilecik
- District: Bozüyük
- Population (2021): 47
- Time zone: UTC+3 (TRT)

Yeşilçukurca is a village in the Bozüyük District, Bilecik Province, Turkey. Its population is 47 (2021).
