= Alibeydüzü, Bozüyük =

Alibeydüzü
- Village
- Location within Turkey Location within Marmara
- Coordinates: 39°56′N 30°04′E
- Country: Turkey
- Province: Bilecik
- District: Bozüyük
- Population (2021): 42
- Time zone: UTC+3 (TRT)

Alibeydüzü is a village in the Bozüyük District, Bilecik Province, Turkey. Its population is 42 (2021).
