= Ormangüzle, Bozüyük =

Ormangüzle
- Village
- Location within Turkey Location within Marmara
- Coordinates: 39°53′N 29°54′E
- Country: Turkey
- Province: Bilecik
- District: Bozüyük
- Population (2021): 76
- Time zone: UTC+3 (TRT)

Ormangüzle is a village in the Bozüyük District, Bilecik Province, Turkey. Its population is 76 (2021).
