= Kızılcapınar, Bozüyük =

Kızılcapınar
- Village
- Location within Turkey Location within Marmara
- Coordinates: 39.8840°N 29.9426°E
- Country: Turkey
- Province: Bilecik
- District: Bozüyük
- Population (2021): 45
- Time zone: UTC+3 (TRT)

Kızılcapınar is a village in the Bozüyük District, Bilecik Province, Turkey. Its population is 45 (2021).
