= Düzağaç, Bozüyük =

Düzağaç
- Village
- Location within Turkey Location within Marmara
- Coordinates: 39.7584°N 29.7888°E
- Country: Turkey
- Province: Bilecik
- District: Bozüyük
- Population (2021): 82
- Time zone: UTC+3 (TRT)

Düzağaç is a village in the Bozüyük District, Bilecik Province, Turkey. Its population is 82 (2021).
