= Kocakovacık, Keles =

Village in Turkey

Kocakovacık
- Neighbourhood
- Location in Turkey Kocakovacık (Marmara)
- Coordinates: 39°50′28″N 29°21′41″E
- Country: Turkey
- Province: Bursa
- District: Keles
- Population (2022): 257
- Time zone: UTC+3 (TRT)

Kocakovacık is a neighbourhood in the municipality and district of Keles, Bursa Province in Turkey. Its population is 257 (2022).
