= Gököz, Keles =

Village in Keles, Bursa Province, Turkey

Gököz
- Neighbourhood
- Location in Turkey Gököz (Marmara)
- Coordinates: 39°56′46″N 29°13′30″E
- Country: Turkey
- Province: Bursa
- District: Keles
- Population (2022): 108
- Time zone: UTC+3 (TRT)

Gököz is a neighbourhood of the municipality and district of Keles, Bursa Province, Turkey. Its population is 108 (2022). It is located northwest of the city of Bursa and south of Mount Uludağ.

== Notable residents ==
- Müzeyyen Senar
