= Suçeyin, Arapgir =

Village in Turkey

Suçeyin
- Neighbourhood
- Location in Turkey
- Coordinates: 39.013°N 38.325°E
- Country: Turkey
- Province: Malatya
- District: Arapgir
- Population (2025): 153
- Time zone: UTC+3 (TRT)

Suçeyin is a neighbourhood in the municipality and district of Arapgir, Malatya Province in Turkey. It is populated by Kurds and Turks and had a population of 153 in 2025.
