= Kayakesen, Arapgir =

Village in Turkey

Kayakesen
- Neighbourhood
- Location in Turkey
- Coordinates: 39.015°N 38.504°E
- Country: Turkey
- Province: Malatya
- District: Arapgir
- Population (2025): 101
- Time zone: UTC+3 (TRT)

Kayakesen is a neighbourhood in the municipality and district of Arapgir, Malatya Province in Turkey. It is had a population of 101 in 2025.
