= Karaağaç, Bozüyük =

Karaağaç
- Village
- Location within Turkey Location within Marmara
- Coordinates: 39.8445°N 30.0196°E
- Country: Turkey
- Province: Bilecik
- District: Bozüyük
- Population (2021): 217
- Time zone: UTC+3 (TRT)

Karaağaç is a village in the Bozüyük District, Bilecik Province, Turkey. Its population is 217 (2021).
