= Gelemiç, Keles =

Village in Turkey

Gelemiç
- Neighbourhood
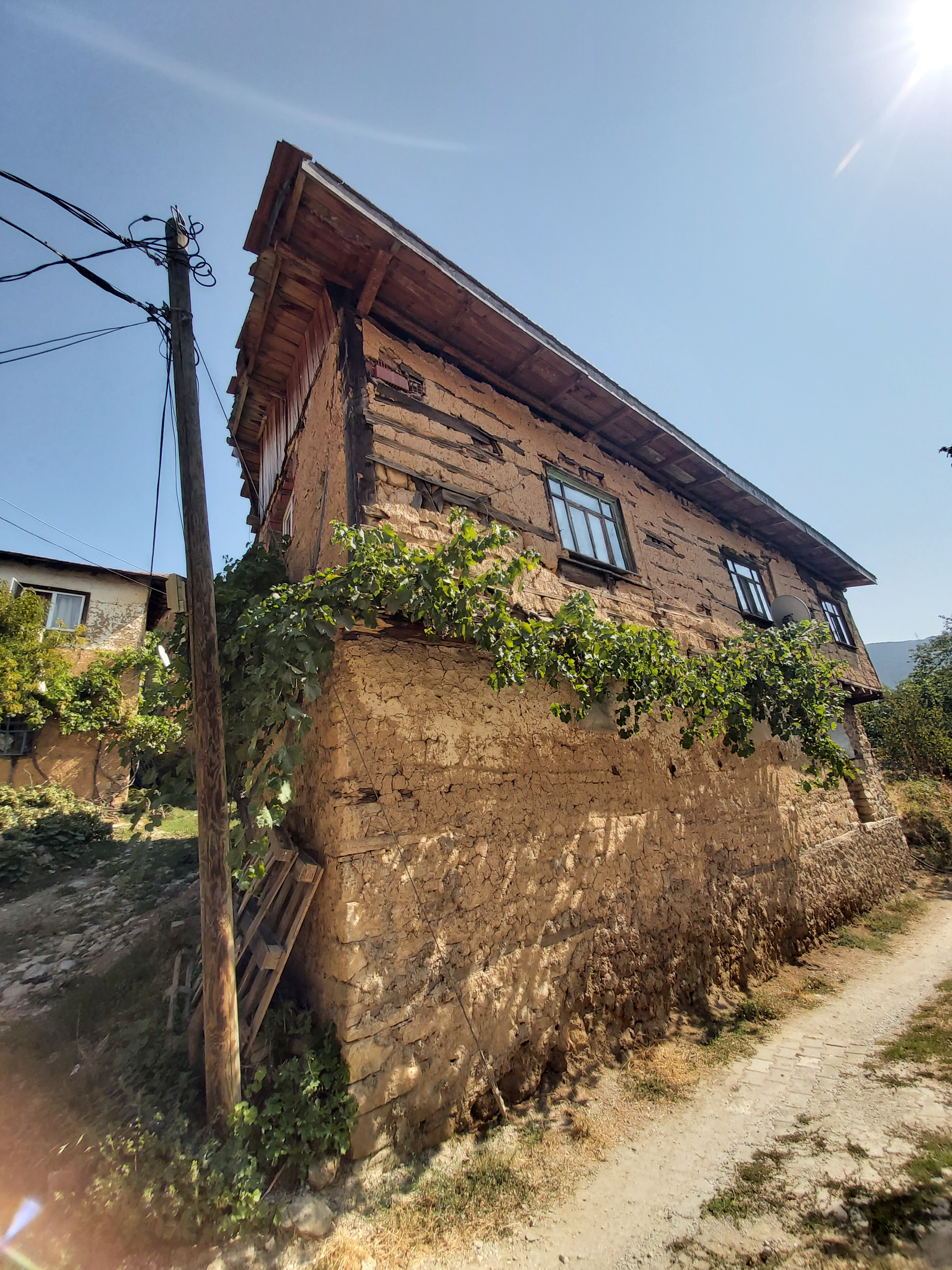

- Location within Turkey Location within Marmara
- Coordinates: 39°53′28″N 29°16′28″E
- Country: Turkey
- Province: Bursa
- District: Keles
- Population (2022): 391
- Time zone: UTC+3 (TRT)

Gelemiç is a neighbourhood in the municipality and district of Keles, Bursa Province in Turkey. Its population is 391 (2022).
