= Karabayır, Bozüyük =

Karabayır
- Village
- Location within Turkey Location within Marmara
- Coordinates: 39°57′4″N 30°4′24″E
- Country: Turkey
- Province: Bilecik
- District: Bozüyük
- Population (2021): 45
- Time zone: UTC+3 (TRT)

Karabayır is a village in the Bozüyük District, Bilecik Province, Turkey. Its population is 45 (2021).
