= Camiliyayla, Bozüyük =

Camiliyayla
- Village
- Location within Turkey Location within Marmara
- Coordinates: 39°49′N 29°47′E
- Country: Turkey
- Province: Bilecik
- District: Bozüyük
- Population (2021): 30
- Time zone: UTC+3 (TRT)

Camiliyayla is a village in the Bozüyük District, Bilecik Province, Turkey. Its population is 30 (2021).
