= Vahagn Davtyan =

Armenian poet, translator, and activist (1922–1996)

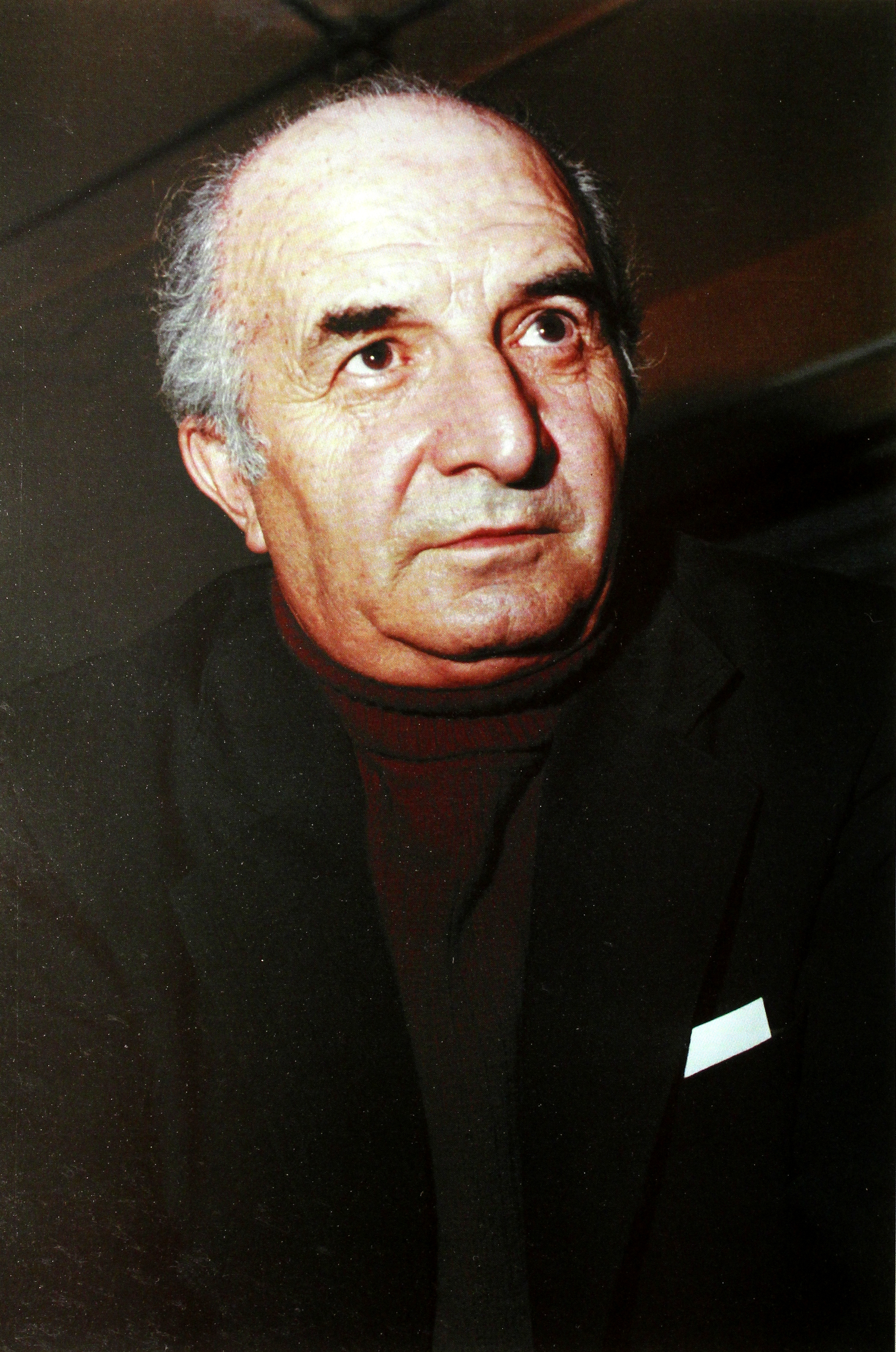

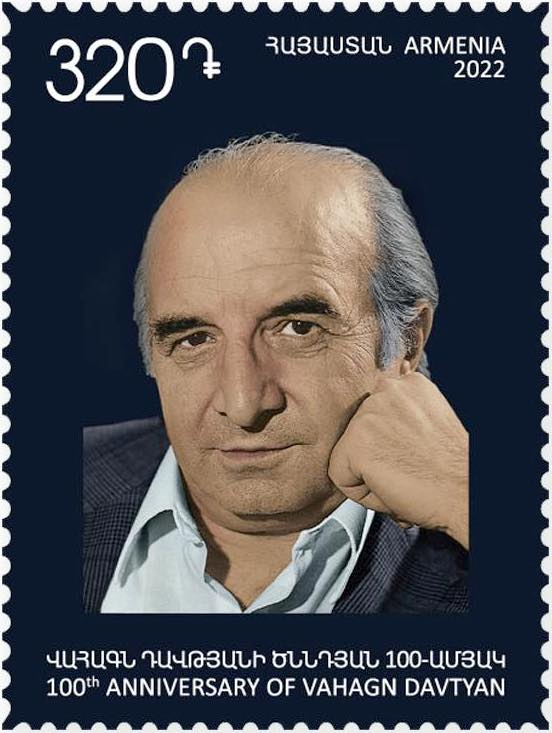
Davtyan on a 2022 stamp of Armenia

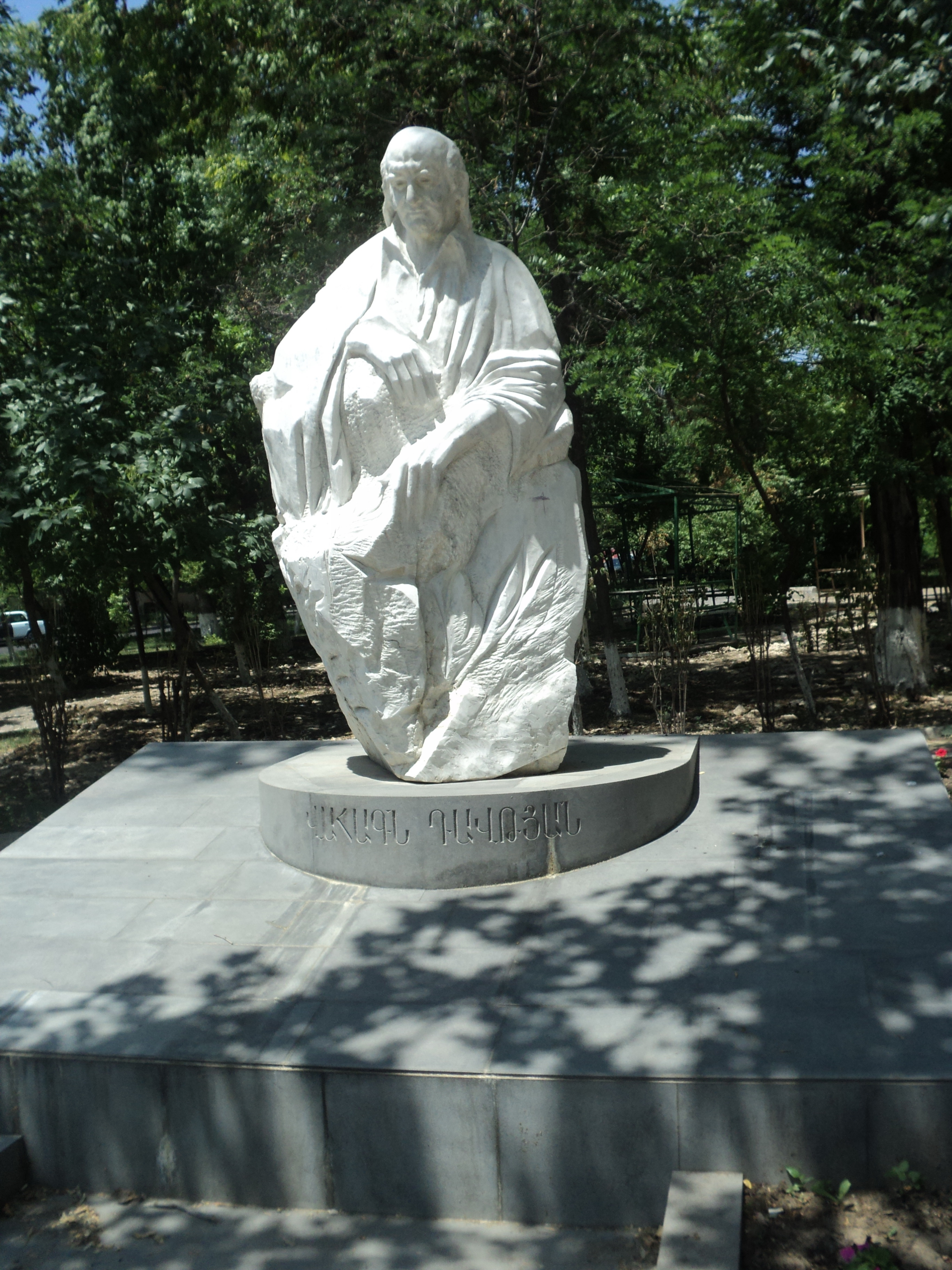
Vahagn Davtyan's monument in Arabkir district of Yerevan. Sculptor Levon Tokmajyan

Vahagn Davtyan (Armenian: Վահագն Դավթյան) (August 15, 1922, Arabkir, Turkey – February 21, 1996, Yerevan) was an Armenian poet, translator, publicist and public activist.

== Biography ==
He was born in the town of Arapgir in Turkey.

Davtyan was a Renowned activist of culture (1971) and a Corresponding Member of Armenian National Academy (1986). He was also an editor ("Grakan tert", "Hayreniki dzayn", "Veradznvadz Hayastan"). From 1990 to 1994 he was the Chairman of the Writers' Union of Armenia.

He translated the works of Alexander Pushkin, Sergei Yesenin, Sándor Petőfi, Alexander Blok, etc. The main theme of his works were fatherland, human, his work and emotions. He mainly wrote poems and ballads.

He died in 1996 in Yerevan, Armenia. Vahagn Davtyan is buried at Komitas Pantheon which is located in the city center of Yerevan.

== Works ==
His works were printed since 1935. In his poem collections "First Love" («Առաջին սեր», 1947) and "The Morning of the World" («Աշխարհի առավոտը», 1950) were expressed the emotions of the participants of the German-Soviet War.

The poem "A Way Along the Heart" («Ճանապարհ սրտի միջով», 1952) is dedicated to Hunan Avetisyan.

He was awarded by the State Prize of Armenia in 1977 and 1985.

== See also ==
- Writers Union of Armenia
