= Metristepe, Bozüyük =

Metristepe
- Village
- Location within Turkey Location within Marmara
- Coordinates: 39°56′N 30°11′E
- Country: Turkey
- Province: Bilecik
- District: Bozüyük
- Population (2021): 58
- Time zone: UTC+3 (TRT)

Metristepe is a village in the Bozüyük District, Bilecik Province, Turkey. Its population is 58 (2021).
