= Yeniçepni, Bozüyük =

Yeniçepni
- Village
- Location within Turkey Location within Marmara
- Coordinates: 39°54′N 30°11′E
- Country: Turkey
- Province: Bilecik
- District: Bozüyük
- Population (2021): 75
- Time zone: UTC+3 (TRT)

Yeniçepni, formerly and still commonly known as Çerkesçepni (Adyghe: Адыгэчэпни, romanized: Adıgəçəpni) is a village in the Bozüyük District, Bilecik Province, Turkey. Its population is 75 (2021). As the name of the village suggests, it is populated by ethnic Circassians from the Hatuqay tribe.
