= Kemaliye, Keles =

Village in Turkey

Kemaliye
- Neighbourhood
- Country: Turkey
- Province: Bursa
- District: Keles
- Population (2022): 225
- Time zone: UTC+3 (TRT)

Kemaliye is a neighbourhood in the municipality and district of Keles, Bursa Province in Turkey. Its population is 225 (2022).
