= Cathedral of Arapgir =

13th-century cathedral in Turkey

Cathedral of the Holy Mother of God Սուրբ Աստվածածին վանք
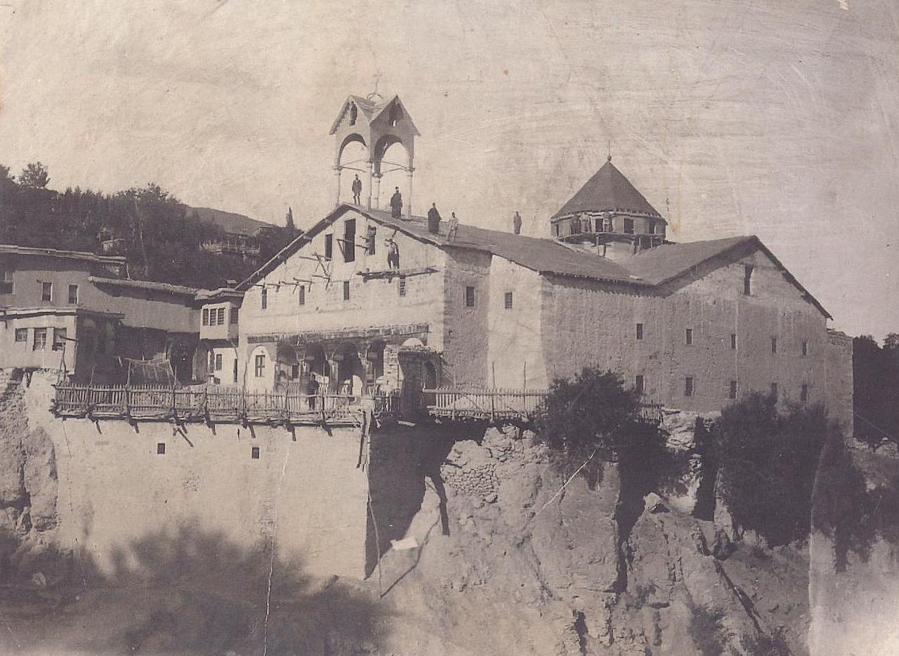
- Cathedral of the Holy Mother of God

- Location within Turkey

Religion
- Affiliation: Armenian Apostolic Church
- Ecclesiastical or organisational status: destroyed in 1957

Location
- Location: Bağci district, Arapgir, Malatya Province, Turkey
- Coordinates: 39.033333°N 38.483333°E

Architecture
- Style: Armenian
- Completed: 1249

The Cathedral of the Holy Mother of God (Armenian: Սուրբ Աստվածածին վանք or Արաբկիրի մայր եկեղեցի; Turkish: Arapkir Ana Kilisesi) was a 13th-century Armenian Apostolic cathedral in Arapgir, Turkey.

The Cathedral of Arapgir named Holy Mother of God was built in the 13th century. It was one of the biggest churches in Western Armenia. It was able to house 3,000 people. The cathedral was attacked and looted and burnt in 1915 during the Armenian genocide. After the Armenian genocide the cathedral was repaired and was used as a school. In 1950 the Municipality of Arapgir decided to demolish the cathedral. On September 18, 1957 the cathedral was blown up with dynamite. And later, the land where the cathedral stood was sold to a peasant named Hüseyin for 28,005 lira. Today, in place of the cathedral are ruins.

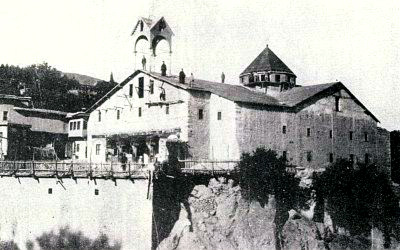

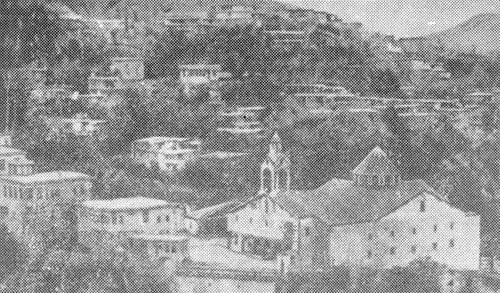

== See also ==
- Arapgir
