= Saraycık, Bozüyük =

Saraycık
- Village
- Location within Turkey Location within Marmara
- Coordinates: 39.8710°N 30.0044°E
- Country: Turkey
- Province: Bilecik
- District: Bozüyük
- Population (2021): 205
- Time zone: UTC+3 (TRT)

Saraycık is a village in the Bozüyük District, Bilecik Province, Turkey. Its population is 205 (2021).
