= Gökçeli, Bozüyük =

Gökçeli
- Village
- Location within Turkey Location within Marmara
- Coordinates: 39.6755°N 29.9647°E
- Country: Turkey
- Province: Bilecik
- District: Bozüyük
- Population (2021): 48
- Time zone: UTC+3 (TRT)

Gökçeli is a village in the Bozüyük District, Bilecik Province, Turkey. Its population is 48 (2021).
