= Taşdelen, Arapgir =

Village in Turkey

Taşdelen
- Neighbourhood
- Location in Turkey
- Coordinates: 38.843°N 38.512°E
- Country: Turkey
- Province: Malatya
- District: Arapgir
- Population (2025): 91
- Time zone: UTC+3 (TRT)

Taşdelen (Kurdish: Mutmur) is a neighbourhood in the municipality and district of Arapgir, Malatya Province in Turkey. It is populated by Kurds and Turks and had a population of 91 in 2025.
