= Hamidiye, Bozüyük =

Hamidiye
- Village
- Location within Turkey Location within Marmara
- Coordinates: 39.9594°N 30.0207°E
- Country: Turkey
- Province: Bilecik
- District: Bozüyük
- Population (2021): 50
- Time zone: UTC+3 (TRT)

Hamidiye is a village in the Bozüyük District, Bilecik Province, Turkey. Its population is 50 (2021).
