= Çamyayla, Bozüyük =

Çamyayla
- Village
- Location within Turkey Location within Marmara
- Coordinates: 39.9265°N 29.9290°E
- Country: Turkey
- Province: Bilecik
- District: Bozüyük
- Population (2021): 37
- Time zone: UTC+3 (TRT)

Çamyayla is a village in the Bozüyük District, Bilecik Province, Turkey. Its population is 37 (2021).
