= Kazanç, Arapgir =

Village in Turkey

Kazanç
- Neighbourhood
- Location in Turkey
- Coordinates: 38.786°N 38.545°E
- Country: Turkey
- Province: Malatya
- District: Arapgir
- Population (2025): 68
- Time zone: UTC+3 (TRT)

Kazanç (Kurdish: Memefîr) is a neighbourhood in the municipality and district of Arapgir, Malatya Province in Turkey. It is populated by Kurds of the Atma tribe and had a population of 68 in 2025.
