= Çokçapınar, Bozüyük =

Çokçapınar
- Village
- Location within Turkey Location within Marmara
- Coordinates: 39°46′N 29°59′E
- Country: Turkey
- Province: Bilecik
- District: Bozüyük
- Population (2021): 110
- Time zone: UTC+3 (TRT)

Çokçapınar is a village in the Bozüyük District, Bilecik Province, Turkey. Its population is 110 (2021).
