= Aşağıarmutlu, Bozüyük =

Aşağıarmutlu
- Village
- Location within Turkey Location within Marmara
- Coordinates: 39.9035°N 29.9468°E
- Country: Turkey
- Province: Bilecik
- District: Bozüyük
- Population (2021): 73
- Time zone: UTC+3 (TRT)

Aşağıarmutlu is a village in the Bozüyük District, Bilecik Province, Turkey. Its population is 73 (2021).
