= Alpağut, Keles =

Village in Turkey

Alpağut
- Neighbourhood
- Location in Turkey Alpağut (Marmara)
- Coordinates: 39.8797°N 29.2136°E
- Country: Turkey
- Province: Bursa
- District: Keles
- Population (2022): 150
- Time zone: UTC+3 (TRT)

Alpağut is a neighbourhood in the municipality and district of Keles, Bursa Province in Turkey. Its population is 150 (2022).
