= Boğazlı, Arapgir =

Village in Turkey

Boğazlı
- Neighbourhood
- Location in Turkey
- Coordinates: 38.966°N 38.425°E
- Country: Turkey
- Province: Malatya
- District: Arapgir
- Population (2025): 116
- Time zone: UTC+3 (TRT)

Boğazlı is a neighbourhood in the municipality and district of Arapgir, Malatya Province in Turkey. It is populated by Turks and had a population of 116 in 2025.
