= Akçapınar, Keles =

Village in Turkey

Akçapınar
- Neighbourhood
- Location in Turkey Akçapınar (Marmara)
- Coordinates: 39.8725°N 29.1666°E
- Country: Turkey
- Province: Bursa
- District: Keles
- Population (2022): 162
- Time zone: UTC+3 (TRT)

Akçapınar is a neighbourhood in the municipality and district of Keles, Bursa Province in Turkey. Its population is 162 (2022).
