= Bozüyük =

- Municipality
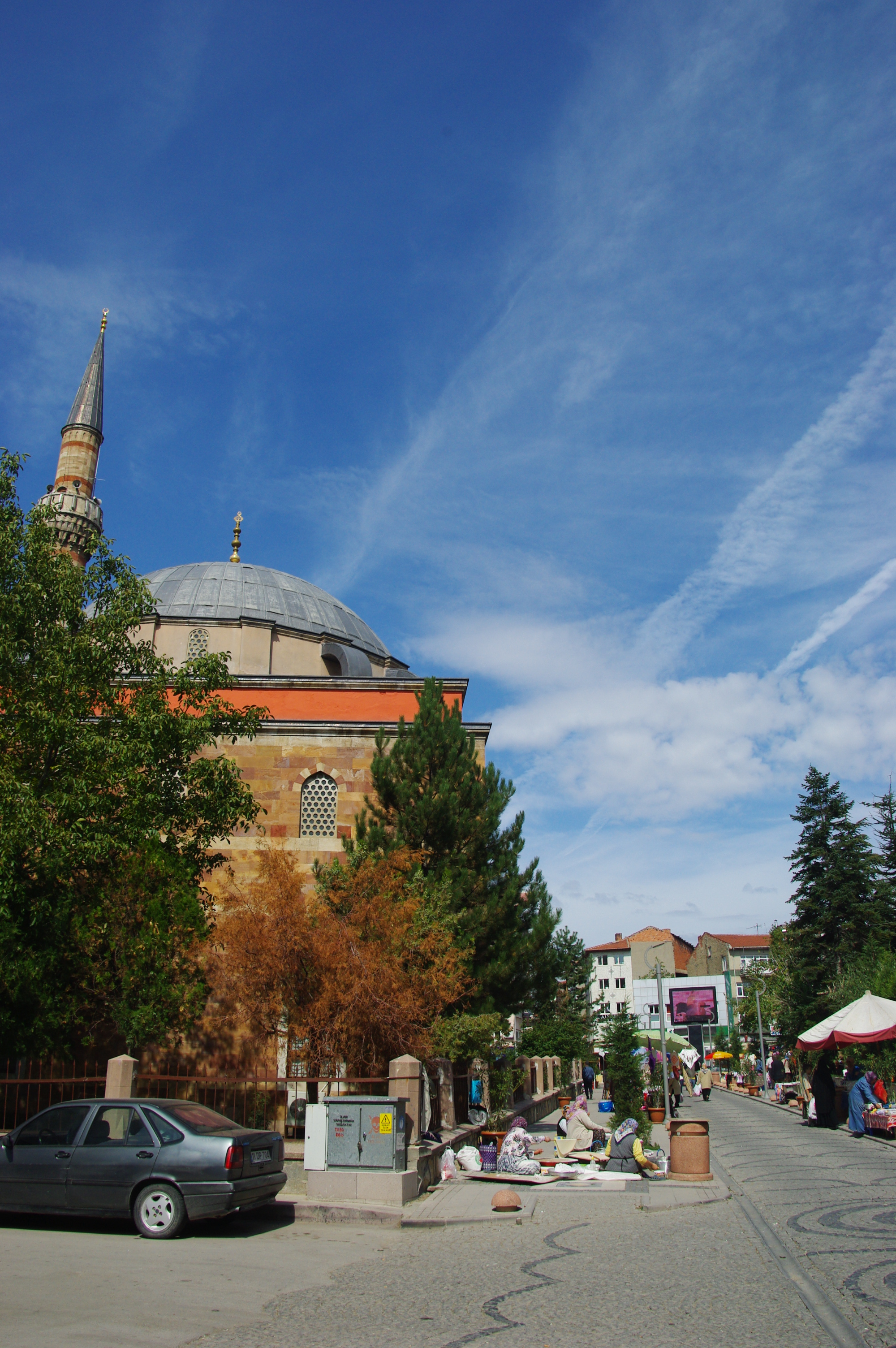
- Kasımpaşa Mosque

- Location within Turkey Location within Marmara
- Coordinates: 39°54′28″N 30°2′12″E
- Country: Turkey
- Province: Bilecik
- District: Bozüyük

Government
  - Mayor: Mehmet Talat Bakkalcıoğlu (CHP)
- Population (2021): 71,806
- Time zone: UTC+3 (TRT)
- Postal code: 11300
- Area code: 0228
- Website: www.bozuyuk.bel.tr

Bozüyük (Turkish: [ˈbozyjyc]) is a city in Bilecik Province in the Marmara region of Turkey. It is the seat of Bozüyük District. Its population is 71,806 (2021), making it the second most populous municipality in the province after Bilecik. Bozüyük depends economically on Eskişehir. The town is 32 km away from Bilecik and 45 km away from Eskişehir. It consists of 10 quarters: Çarşı, Kasımpaşa, Tekke, Yeni, Yediler, 4 Eylül, Yeşilkent, Içköy, Akpınar and Yenidoğan.

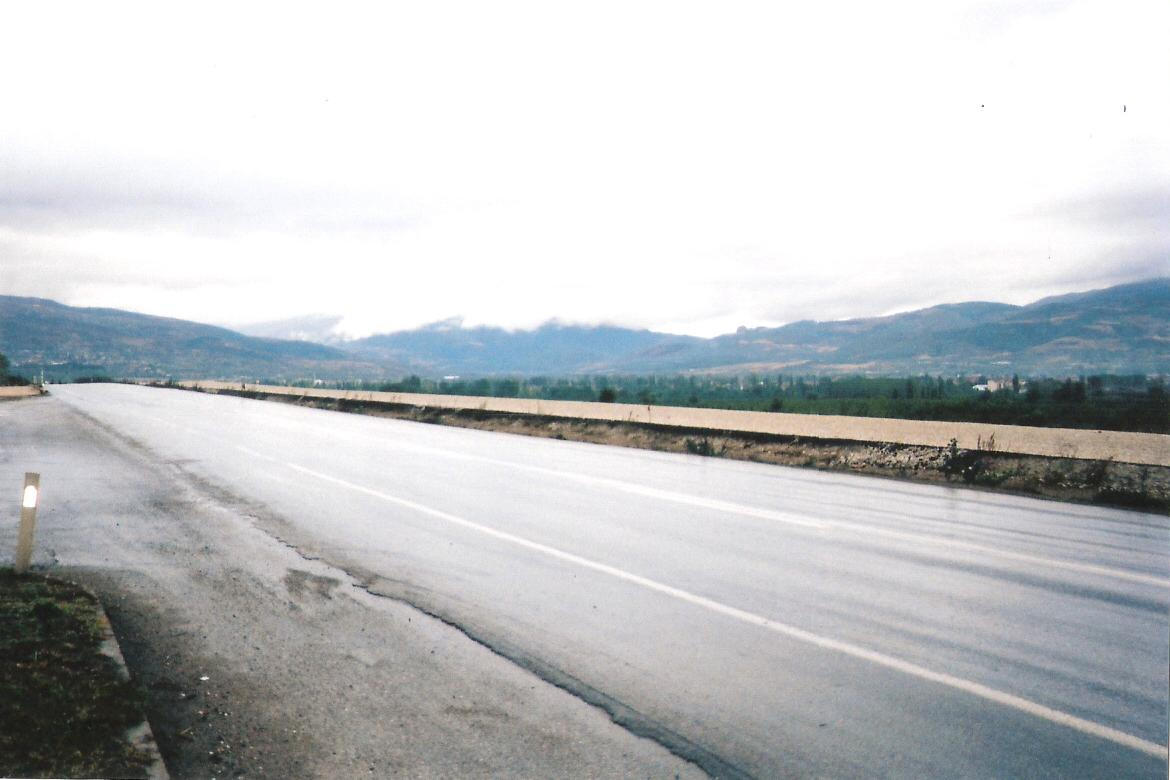
On the way to Bozüyük.
