= Bozalan, Bozüyük =

Bozalan
- Village
- Location within Turkey Location within Marmara
- Coordinates: 39.8350°N 29.9898°E
- Country: Turkey
- Province: Bilecik
- District: Bozüyük
- Population (2021): 44
- Time zone: UTC+3 (TRT)

Bozalan is a village in the Bozüyük District, Bilecik Province, Turkey. Its population is 44 (2021).
