= Khajag Barsamian =

19th and 20th-century Primate of the Armenian Church of America

His Eminence Archbishop Khajag Barsamian
- Primate of the Diocese of the Armenian Church of America (Eastern)
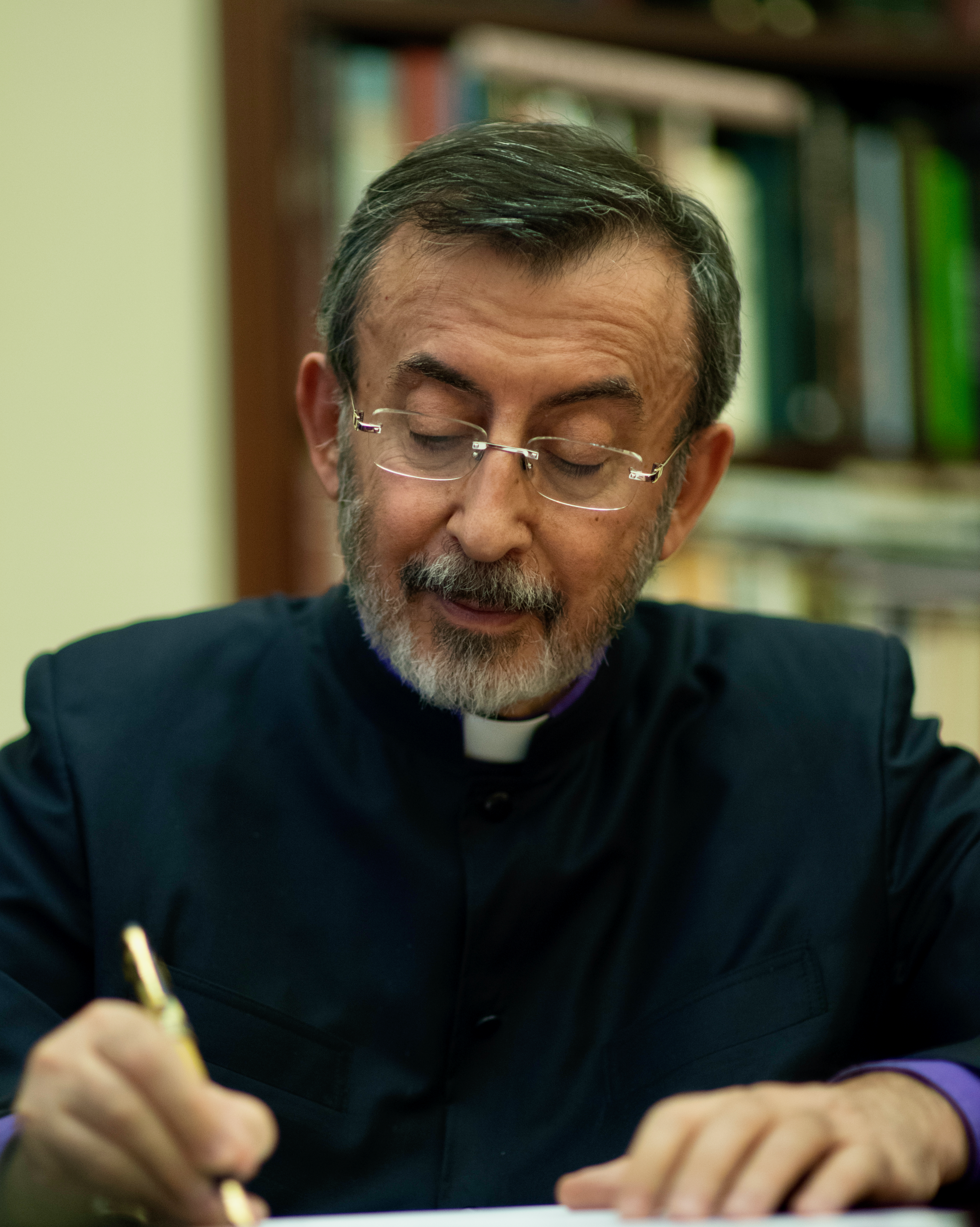
- Archbishop Barsamian at his office in New York City in 2018
- See: Mother See of Holy Etchmiadzin
- Successor: Daniel Findikyan

Orders
- Ordination: 1971 (priestly); 1990 (episcopal)
- Consecration: 1990 (as bishop by Vasken I)

Personal details
- Born: 4 July 1951 (age 75) Arapkir, Turkey
- Denomination: Armenian Apostolic Church
- Residence: Rome, Italy
- Occupation: Cleric; Diplomat
- Profession: Archbishop, Pontifical Legate
- Education: Seminary of St. James, Jerusalem; General Theological Seminary, New York; Pontifical Gregorian University, Rome

Khajag Barsamian (Armenian: Խաժակ Արքեպիսկոպոս Պարսամեան; born July 4, 1951) is an Armenian Orthodox Archbishop who has served as the pontifical legate of Western Europe and representative of the Armenian Apostolic Church to the Holy See since 2018. He was previously the Armenian Primate of America (Eastern) from 1990 to 2018.

== Early life ==
Barsamian was born in Arapkir, Turkey on July 4, 1951. At age 13, he began his religious studies at the Holy Cross Armenian Seminary in Istanbul. Encouraged by Archbishop Shnork Kaloustian (the late Armenian Patriarch of Constantinople), he went to Jerusalem to study at the Seminary of the St. James Armenian Patriarchate from 1967 to 1971. He was ordained a celibate priest in 1971 and achieved the ecclesiastical degree of vartabed two years later.

His later educational pursuits led him throughout the United States and Europe: to New York's General Theological Seminary, St. John's University in Minneapolis, the Gregorian University in Rome, and Oxford's Oriental Institute. He has lectured in the United States, Italy, England, Germany, Jerusalem and Armenia, and has conducted research at the Manuscript Library of Yerevan, the Mekhitarist Institute of Venice and the Manuscript Library at the Patriarchate of Jerusalem. His publications have appeared in various educational and scholarly journals. In October 1991, General Theological Seminary awarded him an Honorary Doctor of Divinity Degree.

== Career ==
Concurrent with and subsequent to his education, he took on pastoral duties in Istanbul; in the Armenian communities in Jaffa, Haifa and Ramleh; and throughout the Eastern Diocese of the Armenian Church of America—in Worcester, Massachusetts; Minneapolis – Saint Paul and at the St. Vartan Armenian Cathedral in New York City, where he served as Vicar General and director of Ecumenical Relations.

=== Primate ===
Barsamian was elected Primate of the Diocese of the Armenian Church of America (Eastern) in the spring of 1990 (succeeding Abp. Torkom Manoogian), and was subsequently elevated to the rank of bishop by Vasken I (the late Supreme Patriarch and Catholicos of All Armenians), at the Cathedral of Holy Echmiadzin. In 1992, he received the rank of archbishop. In May 2018, Barsamian announced that he would not seek an eighth term as Primate. His 28-year reign as Primate is the longest in the history of the Eastern Diocese of the Armenian Church of America. On May 4, 2018, Very Rev. Fr. Daniel Findikyan (now a bishop) was elected as Barsamian's successor and confirmed by Karekin II, the Supreme Patriarch and Spiritual Leader of the Armenian Church.

=== Pontifical legate ===
In 2018, Barsamian became the pontifical legate of Western Europe and representative of the Armenian Apostolic Church to the Holy See.

== Other activities ==
Abp. Barsamian has been a central figure in arranging frequent meetings between the supreme leaders of the Armenian and Catholic churches. He has played a key role in arranging the 2001 visit of Pope John Paul II to Armenia, in bringing together the mass in remembrance of Armenian genocide at St. Peter's Basilica in Rome in 2015, and in organizing the visit of Pope Francis to Armenia in June 2016.

As the former president of Fund for Armenian Relief (FAR), Barsamian led the effort to develop Armenia and bring humanitarian assistance to its citizens.

Abp. Barsamian is a leader in religious and ecumenical organizations, including the National Council of Churches, the World Council of Churches, the Appeal of Conscience Foundation, the National Ethnic Coalition of Organizations, Religion in American Life, and the American Bible Society.

== Recognition ==
He is a recipient of the Ellis Island Medal of Honor, and has received honorary doctorates from General Theological Seminary, Seton Hall University, and the Academy of Sciences of Armenia.

== See also ==
- Armenian Apostolic Church
- Fund for Armenian Relief
