= Selamlı, Arapgir =

Village in Turkey

Selamlı
- Neighbourhood
- Location in Turkey
- Coordinates: 38.952°N 38.588°E
- Country: Turkey
- Province: Malatya
- District: Arapgir
- Population (2025): 35
- Time zone: UTC+3 (TRT)

Selamlı is a neighbourhood in the municipality and district of Arapgir, Malatya Province in Turkey. It is populated by Turks and had a population of 35 in 2025.
