= Belenören, Keles =

Village in Turkey

Belenören
- Neighbourhood
- Location in Turkey Belenören (Marmara)
- Coordinates: 39.8678°N 29.1500°E
- Country: Turkey
- Province: Bursa
- District: Keles
- Population (2022): 300
- Time zone: UTC+3 (TRT)

Belenören is a neighbourhood in the municipality and district of Keles, Bursa Province in Turkey. Its population is 300 (2022).

== History ==
The former name of the village was Belenviran.
