= Keles =

- District and municipality
- Map showing Keles District in Bursa Province

- Location in Turkey Keles (Marmara)
- Coordinates: 39°54′49″N 29°13′46″E
- Country: Turkey
- Province: Bursa

Government
  - Mayor: Ali Doğru (AKP)
- Area: 617 km^{2} (238 sq mi)
- Population (2022): 10,955
  - Density: 17.8/km^{2} (46.0/sq mi)
- Time zone: UTC+3 (TRT)
- Postal code: 16740
- Area code: 0224
- Website: www.keles.bel.tr

Keles is a municipality and district of Bursa Province, Turkey. Its area is 617 km^{2}, and its population is 10,955 (2022).

== Composition ==
There are 42 neighbourhoods in Keles District:

- Akçapınar
- Alpağut
- Avdan
- Baraklı
- Basak
- Belenören
- Bıyıklıalanı
- Çukur
- Cuma
- Dağdemirciler
- Dağdibi
- Davutlar
- Dedeler
- Delice
- Denizler
- Durak
- Düvenli
- Epçeler
- Ertuğrulgazi
- Gelemiç
- Gököz
- Harmanalanı
- Harmancık Demirci
- Haydarköy
- Hereke
- Issızören
- Karaardıç
- Kemaliye
- Kıran Işıklar
- Kirazlı
- Kocakovacık
- Kozbudaklar
- Küçükkovacık
- Menteşe
- Pınarcık
- Sofular
- Sorgun
- Uzunöz
- Yağcılar
- Yazıbaşı
- Yenice
- Yunuslar
