= Bozüyük District =

District of Bilecik Province, Turkey

- District
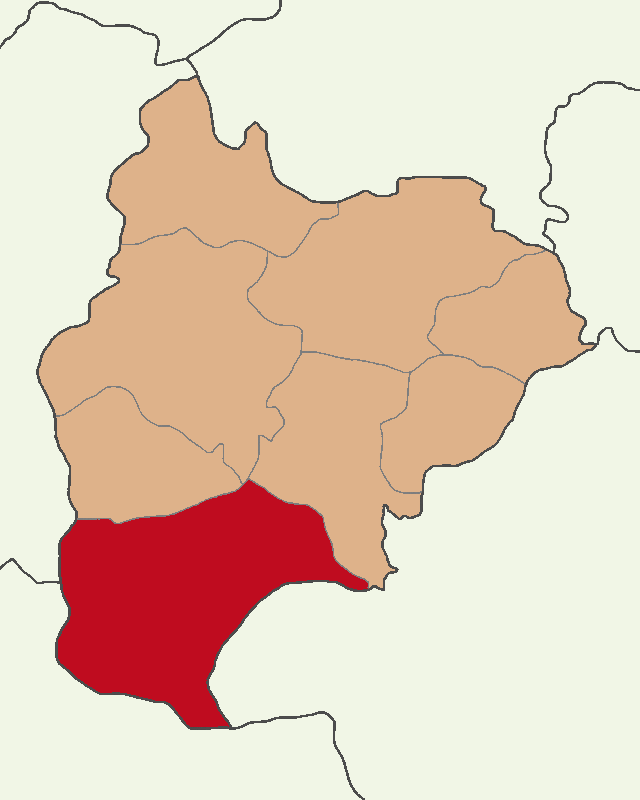
- Map showing Bozüyük District in Bilecik Province

- Location in Turkey Bozüyük District (Marmara)
- Coordinates: 39°54′N 30°2′E
- Country: Turkey
- Province: Bilecik
- Seat: Bozüyük

Government
  - Kaymakam: Adem Öztürk
- Area: 860 km^{2} (330 sq mi)
- Population (2021): 78,010
  - Density: 91/km^{2} (230/sq mi)
- Time zone: UTC+3 (TRT)
- Website: www.bozuyuk.gov.tr

Bozüyük District is a district of Bilecik Province of Turkey. Its seat is the city Bozüyük. Its area is 860 km^{2}, and its population is 78,010 (2021). The district borders İnegöl to the west, Pazaryeri to the northwest, Bilecik to the north, Söğüt to the northeast, Tepebaşı (Eskişehir) to the east, İnönü to the southeast, Kütahya and Tavşanlı to the south and Domaniç to the southwest.

== Composition ==
There are two municipalities in Bozüyük District:

- Bozüyük
- Dodurga

There are 44 villages in Bozüyük District:

- Akçapınar
- Aksutekke
- Alibeydüzü
- Aşağıarmutlu
- Bozalan
- Camiliyayla
- Çamyayla
- Çaydere
- Cihangazi
- Çokçapınar
- Darıdere
- Delielmacık
- Dombayçayırı
- Dübekli
- Düzağaç
- Düzdağ
- Eceköy
- Erikli
- Gökçeli
- Göynücek
- Günyarık
- Hamidiye
- Kandilli
- Kapanalan
- Karaağaç
- Karabayır
- Karaçayır
- Ketenlik
- Kızılcapınar
- Kızıltepe
- Kovalıca
- Kozpınar
- Kuyupınar
- Metristepe
- Muratdere
- Ormangüzle
- Osmaniye
- Poyra
- Revnak
- Saraycık
- Yeniçepni
- Yenidodurga
- Yeniüreğil
- Yeşilçukurca
