= Mesut Bakkal =

Turkish football player and manager (born 1964)

Personal information
- Date of birth: 19 March 1964 (age 62)
- Place of birth: Kırıkkale, Turkey
- Position: Midfielder

Youth career
- –1981: Kırıkkalespor

Senior career*
Years	Team	Apps	(Gls)
1981–1983	Kırıkkalespor		
1983–1993	Denizlispor	117	(6)
1990–1991	→ Afyonspor (loan)	1	(0)
1993–1994	İzmirspor	5	(0)

International career
1982	Turkey U18	3	(0)
1985	Turkey U21	2	(0)

Managerial career
- 1996–1998: Denizlispor (youth)
- 1998–2000: Denizlispor (coach)
- 2000–2002: Ankaragücü (coach)
- 2005–2007: Gençlerbirliği
- 2007–2008: Gaziantepspor
- 2008–2009: Gençlerbirliği
- 2009: Denizlispor
- 2009–2010: Manisaspor
- 2010: Sivasspor
- 2011: Ankaragücü
- 2012: Samsunspor
- 2012–2013: Karabükspor
- 2013–2014: Konyaspor
- 2015: Gençlerbirliği
- 2015: Mersin İdmanyurdu
- 2016: Sivasspor
- 2016–2017: Sivasspor
- 2017: Kayserispor
- 2017: Gençlerbirliği
- 2018–2019: Alanyaspor
- 2019: Bursaspor
- 2020–2021: Erzurumspor
- 2022: Denizlispor
- 2022–2023: Bandırmaspor
- 2023–2024: Amedspor
- 2024–2025: Sakaryaspor
- 2025: Ankaragücü
- 2025: Şanlıurfaspor
- 2026: Amedspor
- * Club domestic league appearances and goals

Mesut Bakkal (born 19 March 1964) is a Turkish professional football manager and former player of Circassian origin who most recently managed Amedspor.

A midfielder, he played for Denizlispor, and later was manager of Ankaragücü, Denizlispor, Gaziantepspor, Gençlerbirliği S.K., Karabükspor, Manisaspor, and Samsunspor.

== Career ==
Bakkal was born in Kırıkkale to Circassian parents from Bilecik, Northwest Turkey. The Bakkal family is from the Circassian village of Poyra in Bilecik, and belongs to the Hatuqay tribe of Circassians. Bakkal began playing football for local side Kırıkkalespor. He would later play for Denizlispor, Afyonspor, and İzmirspor before retiring from active play in 1994.

After his playing career ended, Bakkal became a football manager. He resigned as Gençlerbirliği's manager for the second time in his career, on 3 November 2008.

In 2009 he received a UEFA Pro License.
