= Kuyupınar, Bozüyük =

Kuyupınar
- Village
- Location within Turkey Location within Marmara
- Coordinates: 39.8378°N 29.9558°E
- Country: Turkey
- Province: Bilecik
- District: Bozüyük
- Population (2021): 65
- Time zone: UTC+3 (TRT)

Kuyupınar is a village in the Bozüyük District, Bilecik Province, Turkey. Its population is 65 (2021).
