= Gude =

Gude is a surname. Notable people with the surname include:

- Gerard Pierre Laurent Kalshoven Gude (1858–1924), British malacologist
- Gilbert Gude (1923–2007), United States Representative from Maryland
- Hans Gude (1825–1903), Norwegian romanticist painter
- Marquard Gude (1635–1689), German archaeologist and classical scholar
- Olivia Gude (born 1950), American artist and educator

== See also ==
- Güde, Pazaryeri, village in the Bilecik Province, Turkey
- Gude language
