= İnönü, Eskişehir =

İnönü
- District and municipality
- Map showing İnönü District in Eskişehir Province

- Location in Turkey İnönü (Turkey Central Anatolia)
- Coordinates: 39°48′47″N 30°08′38″E
- Country: Turkey
- Province: Eskişehir

Government
  - Mayor: Serhat Hamamci (AKP)
- Area: 345 km^{2} (133 sq mi)
- Elevation: 840 m (2,760 ft)
- Population (2022): 6,173
  - Density: 17.9/km^{2} (46.3/sq mi)
- Time zone: UTC+3 (TRT)
- Postal code: 26670
- Area code: 0222
- Website: www.inonu.bel.tr

İnönü (Turkish: [ˈinœny]) is a municipality and district of Eskişehir Province, Turkey. Its area is 345 km^{2}, and its population is 6,173 (2022). Its elevation is 840 m (2,756 ft).

İnönü has a strategic location on the Istanbul-Eskişehir railway and Bozüyük-Kütahya highway. It also hosts Ford Otosan's truck production facility.

== History ==
During the western front (also known as the Greco-Turkish War (1919–22) of the Turkish War of Independence in 1921, the First and Second Battles of İnönü took place near the town between the Turkish and the Greek forces. The battles were named after the town, and İsmet İnönü, the Turkish commanding officer during the battles and future President and Prime Minister of Turkey, was given his surname in honor of his services during the battles.

Before it became a district in 1987, İnönü belonged to Söğüt district of Bilecik Province in 1922. Afterwards, it became part of Bozüyük district in 1926 and central district of Eskişehir Province in 1963. İnönü was a township center until 1987.

Archaeologist Adil Yılmaz discovered a stone statue in the cemetery of Geyikdere village, dating back to the 13th century. It is seen in the Desht-i Kipchak region, which extends from Romania to Mongolia, but is not seen in the Oghuz and Seljuk regions. This stone statue is just one of the stones he has discovered in the region. He argues that the stone statues he discovered are related to the Cuman-Kipchak settlements established in Western Anatolia in 1241 during the Empire of Nicaea as a buffer zone. A similar example was found in a cemetery in the İnönü district of Eskişehir in 2019. No claims have been made regarding the dating or style of that example, discovered by a team from the History Department of Bilecik Şeyh Edebali University. Adil Yılmaz has published some of the stone statues he found in the region. He also published a stone statue in the same style found in the Dereköy historical cemetery in Pazaryeri, Bilecik, in his own village.

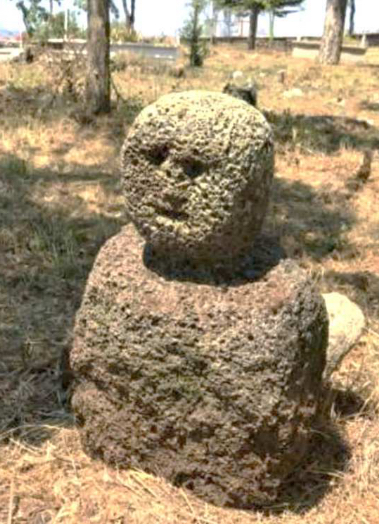
Cuman-Kipchak type stone statue in Eskişehir İnönü district

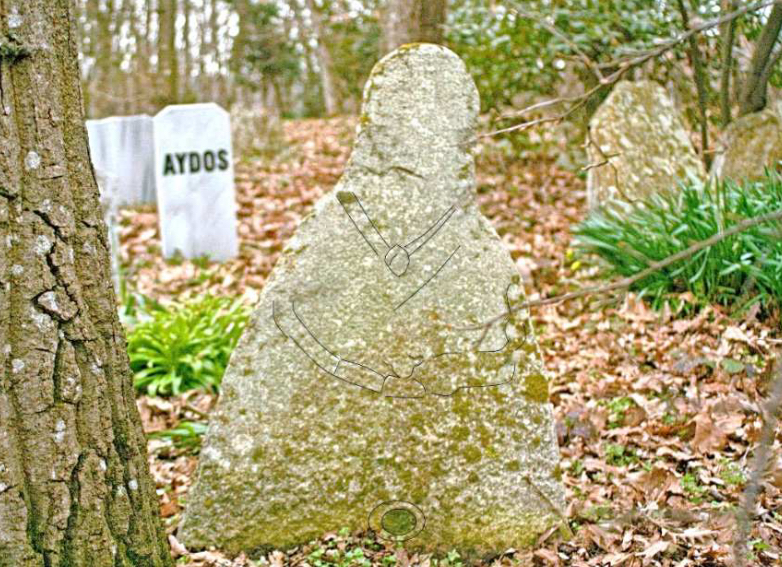
Cuman-Kipchak type stone statue in Geyikdere village of Yalova Altınova District

== Composition ==
There are 16 neighbourhoods in İnönü District:

- Aşağıkuzfındık
- Çarşı
- Dereyalak
- Dutluca
- Erenköy
- Esnemez
- İsmetpaşa
- Kümbet
- Kümbetakpınar
- Kümbetyeniköy
- Oklubalı
- Orta
- Seyitaliköyü
- Yenice
- Yukarıkuzfındık
- Yürükyayla
