= Dereköy, Pazaryeri =

Dereköy
- Village
- Location within Turkey Location within Marmara
- Coordinates: 39.9876°N 29.8524°E
- Country: Turkey
- Province: Bilecik
- District: Pazaryeri
- Population (2021): 279
- Time zone: UTC+3 (TRT)

Dereköy is a village in the Pazaryeri District, Bilecik Province, Turkey. Its population is 279 (2021).

== History ==
The village has held the same name since 1928. Archaeologist Adil Yılmaz discovered a stone statue in the cemetery of Dereköy, a former Manav settlement and his own village, dating back to the 13th century. It was found in the Desht-i Kipchak region, which stretched from Romania to Mongolia, but was not seen in the Oghuz and Seljuk regions. This stone statue is just one of the stones he discovered and has been discovered in the region. He argues that the stone statues he discovered are related to the Cuman-Kipchak settlements established in Western Anatolia in 1241 during the Empire of Nicaea as a buffer zone. A similar example was found in a cemetery in the İnönü district of Eskişehir in 2019. A team from the History Department of Bilecik Şeyh Edebali University has not offered any information regarding the dating or style of that example. Adil Yılmaz has published some of the stone statues he found, made in the same style. A similar example was found in the village of Geyikdere, in the Altınova district of Yalova.
