= Visual arts education =

Area of arts education based on visuals

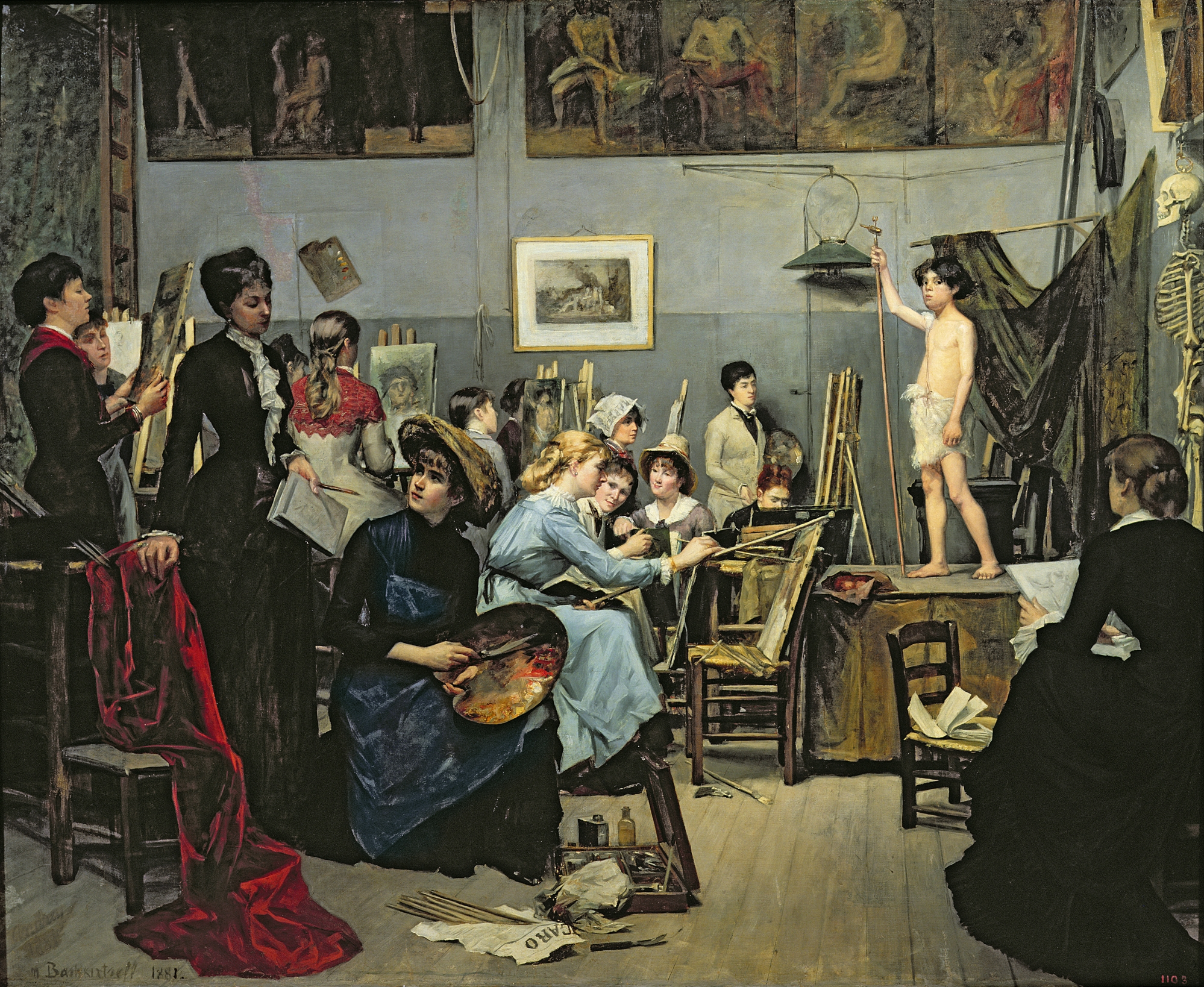
1881 painting by Marie Bashkirtseff, In the Studio, depicts an art school life drawing session, Dnipropetrovsk State Art Museum, Dnipropetrovsk, Ukraine

Visual arts education is the area of learning that is based upon visual art forms such as—drawing, painting, sculpture, printmaking. Within these forms of art may be designs in jewelry, pottery, weaving, fabrics, and design applied to more practical fields such as commercial graphics and home furnishings. Contemporary topics include photography, video, film, design, and computer art.

Overall, Art education focuses on students creating art, on learning to criticize or appreciate art, or some combination of the two. The key components of teaching art is different among different groups of people, depending on their teaching style, culture, or even the country that they live in. Visual Arts education has been adapted in many ways, even to those members of special education

== Approaches ==
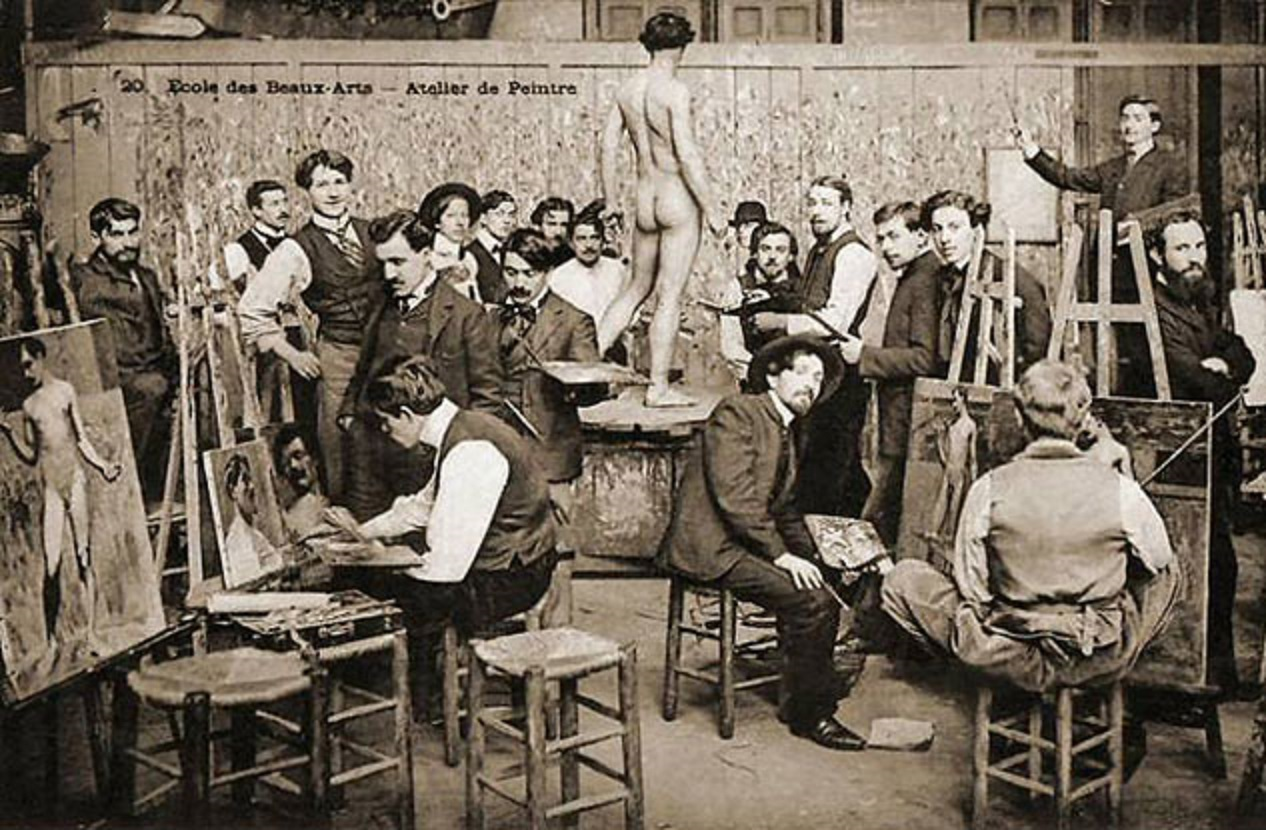
Art model posing in a French painting school following the atelier method

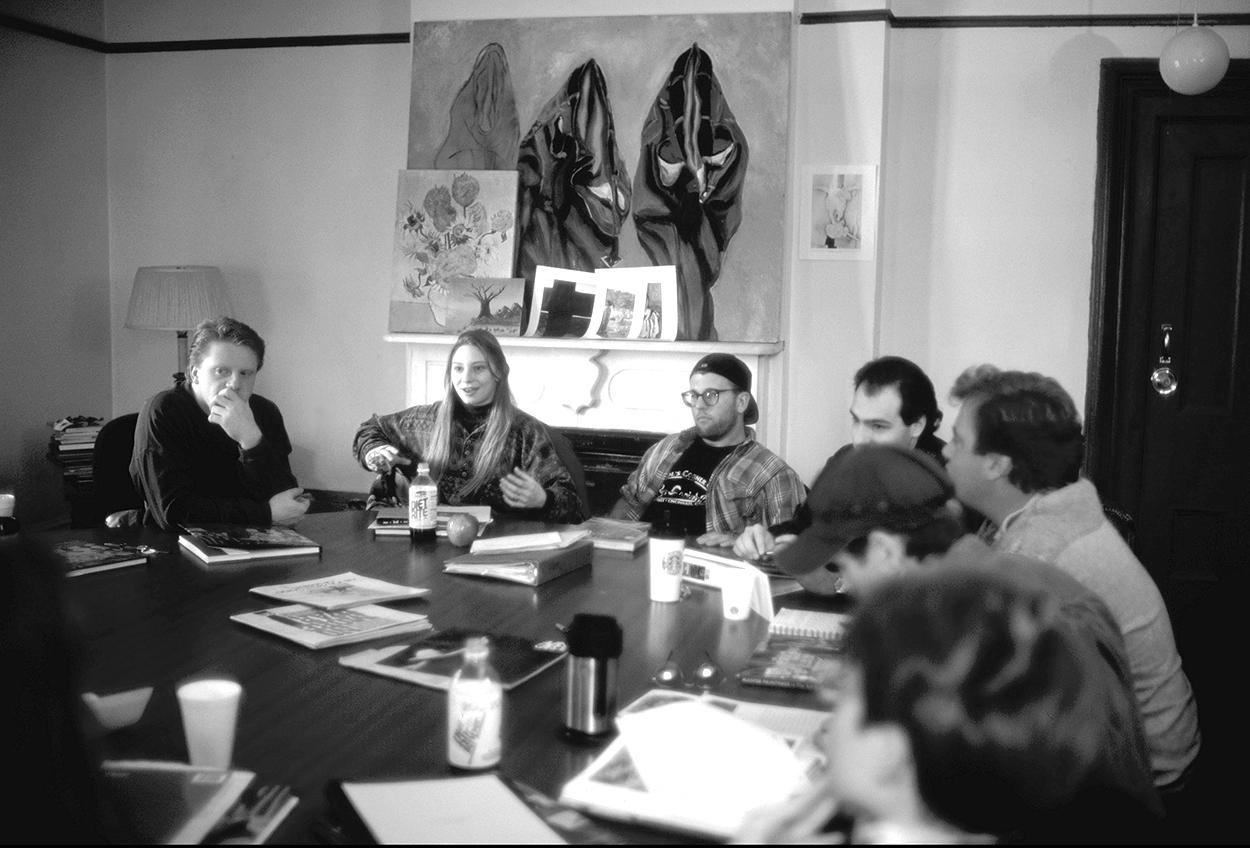
Discussion class on art appreciation at Shimer College

Art is often taught through drawing, painting, sculpture, installation, and mark making. Drawing is viewed as an empirical activity which involves seeing, interpreting and discovering appropriate marks to demonstrate an object, place, or thing based on an observation. Drawing instruction has been a component of formal education in the West since the Hellenistic period. In East Asia, arts education for nonprofessional artists typically focused on brushwork; calligraphy was numbered among the Six Arts of gentlemen in the Chinese Zhou dynasty, and calligraphy and Chinese painting were numbered among the four arts of scholar-officials in imperial China.

An alternative approach to art education involves an emphasis on imagination, both in interpreting and creating art. Many educators require student analysis and peer critique on artwork. This is to get students to consider the deeper meaning behind works, rather than just showing them a pretty picture. Art education is also about experimentation and purposeful play and linking their art to conceptual messages and personal experiences. Allowing students to connect a piece to emotion, helps them better understand how the artwork connects to the artist and their subject, developing their critical thinking skills. Alternative approaches, such as visual culture and issue-based approaches in which students explore societal and personal issues through art, also inform art education today.

Prominent curricular models for art education include:

- A sixfold model divided into "Creative-Productive, Cultural-Historical and Critical-Responsive" components in some provinces of Canada
- Discipline Based Art Education (DBAE) came to favor in the United States during the 1980s and 1990s, and it focused on specific skills including techniques, art criticism and art history. Heavily backed by the Getty Education Institute for the Arts, DBAE faded after the Institute ceased funding in 1998.
- Teaching for Artistic Behavior (TAB) is a choice-based model that began in the 1970s in Massachusetts in the United States. TAB suggests that students should be the artists and be guided on their own individual artistic interests.TAB based curricular models have increased in popularity as classroom culture shifts from preference of direct instruction to student-centered and Inquiry-based learning.

In addition, especially in higher education in the liberal arts tradition, art is often taught as "art appreciation", a subject for aesthetic criticism rather than direct engagement.

Some studies show that strong art education programs have demonstrated increased student performance in other academic areas, due to art activities' exercising their brains' right hemispheres and delateralizing their thinking. Also see Betty Edwards' Drawing on the Right Side of the Brain.

Art education is not limited to formal educational institutions. Some professional artists provide private or semi-private instruction in their own studios. This may take the form of an apprenticeship in which the student learns from a professional artist while assisting the artist with their work. One form of this teaching style is the Atelier Method as exemplified by Gustave Moreau who taught Picasso, Braque and many other artists.

=== Apprenticeship ===
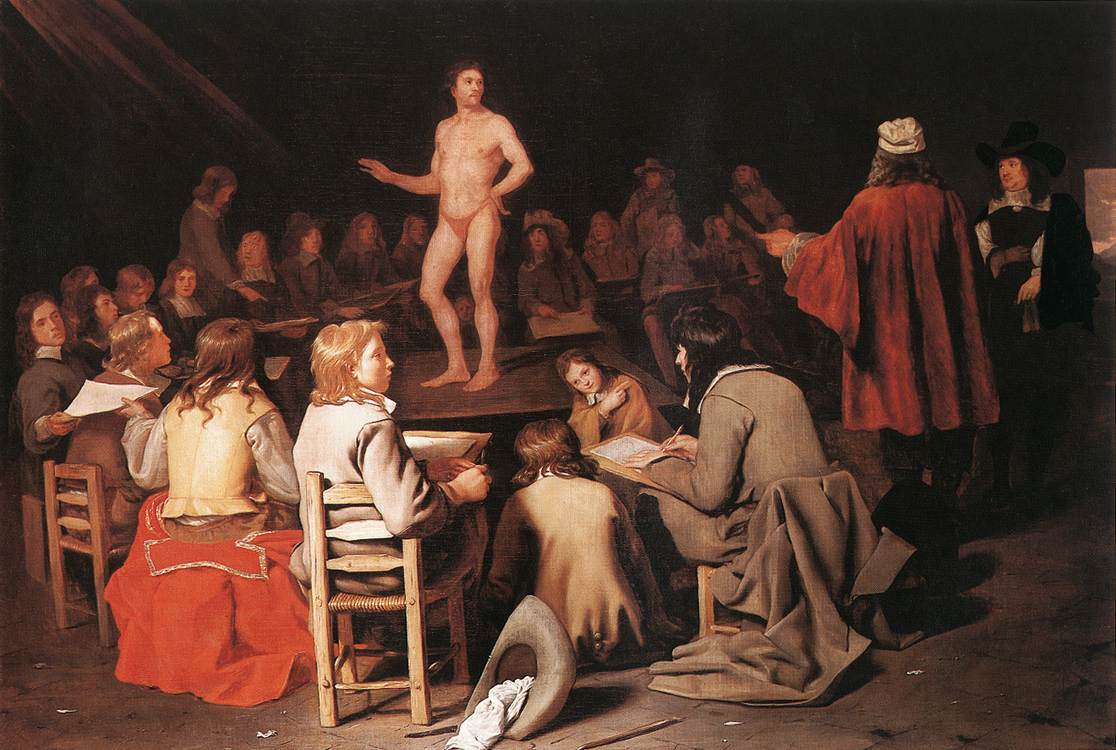
The Drawing Class, by Michiel Sweerts, c. 1656

Historically art was taught in Europe via the atelier method system where artists took on apprentices who learned their trade in much the same way as that of craft guilds such as the stonemasons or goldsmiths. During their free time formal training took place in art workshops or, more often, in homes or alone outside. It was in these ateliers that artists learned the craft through apprenticeship to masters, a relationship that was controlled by guild statutes. Florentine contracts dating from the late 13th century state that the master was expected to clothe and feed the apprentice, who was called upon to be a faithful servant in return. An apprentice often paid the master during the early years of his education; assuming the apprenticeship was productive, the student would be compensated later in his training. Northern European workshops featured similar terms.

Initially, learning to draw was a priority in this system. Michelangelo recommended that a young painter spend a year on drawing alone, then six years grinding colors, preparing panels and using gold leaf, during which time the study of drawing would continue. Another six years would be required to master fresco and tempera painting.

Historically, design has had some precedence over the fine arts with schools of design being established all over Europe in the 18th century. These examples of skill and values from the early European art inspired later generations, including the Colonists of early America.

=== Cultural appropriation within the classroom ===
Individuals who employ cultural appropriation have the ability to produce works of considerable aesthetic merit. Using properties of art from different cultures such as decoration or emulation of creative process can foster a greater understanding and appreciation of crafts from different cultures. This technique can be appreciated in the production of African or Native-American mask making projects, where students emulate technique and explore new material use and construction methods which esteem those practices of different cultures.

== By country ==
=== Argentina ===
The leading country in the development of the arts in Latin America, in 1875 created the National Society for the Stimulus of the Arts (Sociedad Nacional para Estímulo de las Artes), founded by painters Eduardo Schiaffino, Eduardo Sívori, and other artists. In 1905, their guild was rechartered as the National Academy of Fine Arts (Academia Nacional de Bellas Artes), then in 1923, on the initiative of painter and academic Ernesto de la Cárcova, became a department in the University of Buenos Aires, under the name of Superior Art School of the Nation (Escuela Superior Nacional de Bellas Artes). Currently, the country's leading educational organization for the arts is the UNA Universidad Nacional de las Artes.

=== Australia ===
Australian Universities which have Visual / Fine Art departments or courses within their institutions have moved from Studio Based teaching models, associated with Art Schools, to more integrated theoretical / practical emphasis. University of Western Australia has moved from a master's degree with theoretical emphasis to a theoretical BA Art degree.

Studio based teaching initiatives integrating contextual and media elements have been implemented as part of a national Studio Teaching Project supported by the Australian Learning and Teaching Council (ALTC) since 2007.

=== Egypt ===
The first modern art school in Egypt was opened in 1908 as the Cairo College of Fine Arts. These early art schools largely taught the Western aesthetic traditions. As a result, after independence there was an effort to incorporate Egyptian and Middle Eastern traditions into art and art appreciation courses. However, the process was slow; students at Cairo College of Fine Arts were not able to major in non-European art history until 1999.

=== France ===
The first academy, the Académie royale de peinture et de sculpture, was founded in 1648.

Nowadays, artistic education, which includes visual arts education, is a mandatory part of the school education from the second cycle on (six years old) and runs until the end of the lower secondary school (collège).

There are art-focused classes (classes à horaires aménagés) in some schools that provide advanced art education in parallel to the normal primary or lower secondary education. In the upper secondary schools, it is possible to prepare a baccalauréat technologique in sciences and technologies of design and applied arts (STD2A, former F12).

In tertiary education, dedicated schools propose a diplôme national des métiers d'art et du design (DN MADE, national diploma of art and design professions) with several diplômes des métiers d'art (DMA, bachelor's degree in art professions), and then diplôme supérieur d'arts appliqués (DSAA, master's degree in applied arts).

=== Italy ===
Art schools were established in Italy as early as the 13th century, starting with a painting school in Venice founded by a Greek painter named Theophanes around 1200.

=== The Netherlands ===
The Dutch Art Teachers Association (Nederlandse Vereniging voor Tekenonderwijs) was founded in 1880 and began to publish a monthly magazine in 1884. Since the late 20th century, the growing diversity of Dutch society has made Dutch art and art education increasingly multicultural.

=== United Kingdom ===
Formal art education emerged in the United Kingdom in the early 19th century, motivated in part by a desire to match the quality of design work being done in France. The model initially adopted was that of the German commercial schools. Prince Albert was particularly influential in the creation of schools of Art in the UK.

Currently in the UK, the art curriculum is prescribed by the government's National Curriculum except in public or fee paying schools. Prince Charles has created The Prince's Drawing School in Hoxton to preserve the teaching of academic drawing.

==== AccessArt ====
AccessArt is a British arts charity and membership organization, working across the UK to further 'the advancement of visual arts education'. It is the leading provider of digital visual arts resources in the UK, with over 22,000 schools as paying members, using AccessArt's educational materials in their teaching.

Founded in 1999 by Royal College of Art graduates, Paula Briggs and Sheila Ceccarelli and registering as a charity in 2004. Projects include:

Inspire: A celebration of children's art, Fitzwilliam Museum, Cambridge. [December 2019 – March 2020]

"The first exhibition of work made by primary school children at The Fitzwilliam Museum in its 250 year history and was designed in partnership with AccessArt.""The Inspire project demonstrates how a regional art museum can serve as a hub for teacher training and development and support the development of a community of practice around art and design education."

=== United States ===
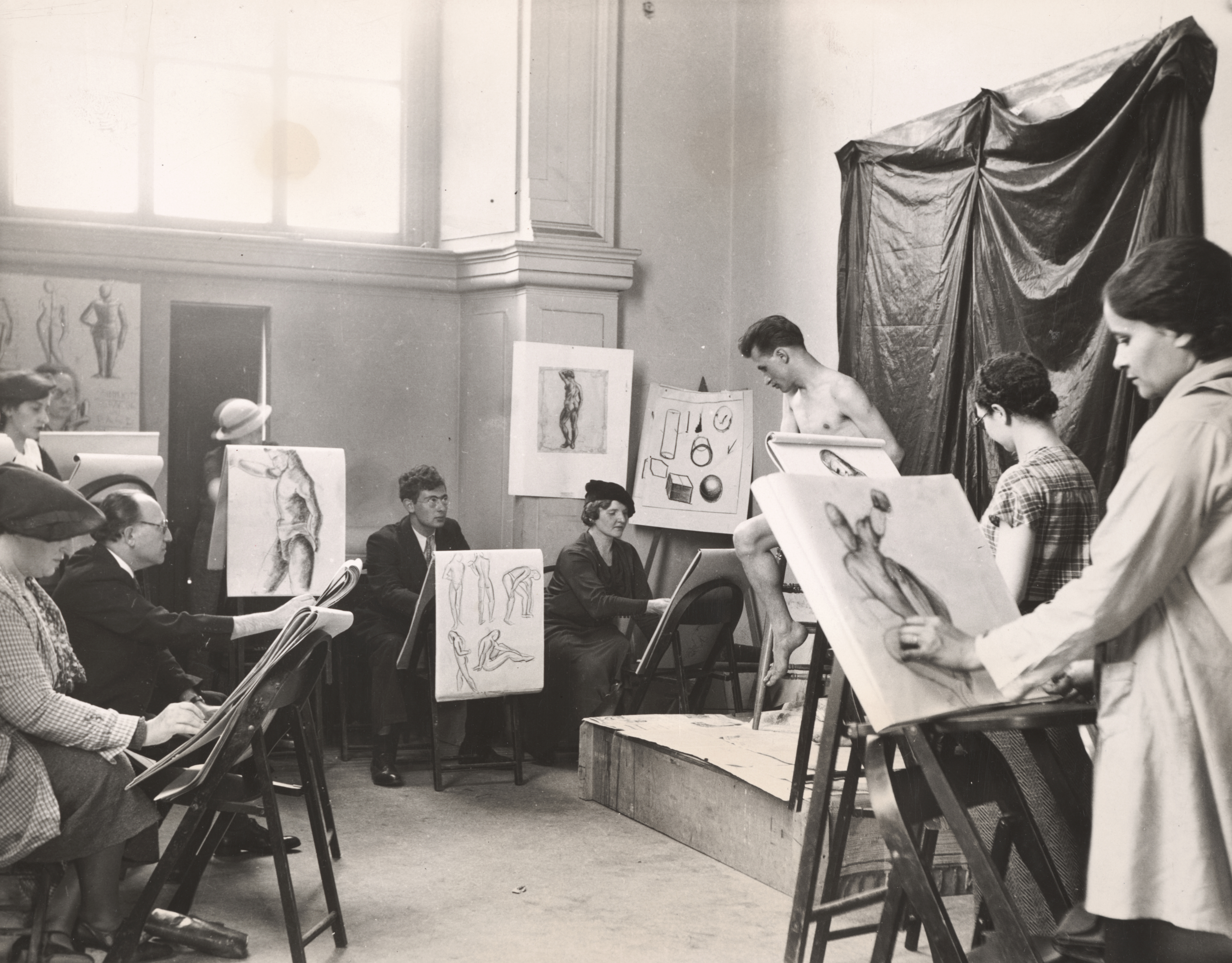
Adult art education class at the Brooklyn Museum in 1935.

The study of art appreciation in America began with the Artists of Today Movement in the late 19th century and began to fade at the end of the 1920s. Picture study was an important part of the art education curriculum. Attention to the aesthetics in classrooms led to public interest in beautifying the school, home, and community, which was known as "Art in Daily Living". The idea was to bring culture to the child to change the parents. The picture study movement died out at the end of the 1920s as a result of new ideas regarding learning art appreciation through studio work became more popular in the United States.

American educational philosopher and school reformer John Dewey was influential in broadening access to art education in the United States in the late 19th and early 20th century.

Since World War II, artist training has moved to elementary schools, and contemporary art has become an increasingly academic and intellectual field. Prior to World War II an artist did not usually need a college degree. Since that time the Bachelor of Fine Arts and then the Master of Fine Arts became recommended degrees to be a professional artist, facilitated by the passage of the G.I. Bill in 1944, which sent a wave of World War II veterans off to school, art school included. University art departments quickly expanded. American artists who might once have studied at bohemian, craft-intensive schools like the Art Students League, Black Mountain College, or the Hans Hofmann School of Art in Greenwich Village; began enrolling at universities instead. By the 60s, The School of Visual Arts, Pratt Institute, and Cooper Union in New York City and other art schools across the country like the Kansas City Art Institute, the San Francisco Art Institute, the School of the Art Institute of Chicago, the School of the Museum of Fine Arts, Boston, Princeton and Yale had become one of the first art academies. This trend spread from the United States around the world.

Enrollment in art classes at the high school level peaked in the late 1960s—early 1970s. With No Child Left Behind (NCLB) (which retains the arts as part of the "daily life", but does not require reporting or assessment data on this area) there has been additional decline of arts education in American public schools. The United States Department of Education now awards Arts in Education Model Development and Dissemination grants to support organizations with art expertise in their development of artistic curricula. After 2010, an estimate of 25% of the nation's public high schools will end all art programs. Various "ed-tech" companies like Kadenze and edX have attempted to mitigate this loss through online arts education.

National organizations promoting arts education include Americans for the Arts including Art. Ask For More., its national arts education public awareness campaign; Association for the Advancement of Arts Education; Arts Education Partnership.;

Professional organizations for art educators include the National Art Education Association, which publishes the practitioner-friendly journal Art Education and the research journal Studies in Art Education; USSEA (the United States Society for Education through Art) and InSEA (the International Society for Education through Art).

Education through the visual arts is an important and effective influence in allowing students, from an early age, to comprehend and implement the foundational democratic process emphasized within the United States societal structure. In 2008, the National Assessment of Educational Progress (NAEP) studied 7,900 eight-grade students in the fields of art and music. The findings of the study concluded that female students earned higher scores than their male peers in both music and visual art.

Olivia Gude, the 2009 recipient of the National Art Education Association's Lowenfeld Lecture Scholarship, spoke about the numerous ways in which art education is instrumental in forming an informed self- and world-aware citizen. She asserts that:

Through art education, students develop enhanced skills for understanding the meaning making of others. Through quality art education, youth develop the capacity to learn several jobs much easier than others. Most significantly, engagement with the arts teaches youth to perceive complexity as pleasure and possibility, not as irritating uncertainty. Heightened self-awareness is extended to heightened awareness of others . . .

Michelle Marder Kamhi, who has written on art education, is highly critical of recent trends in the field in the United States and elsewhere. She dismisses much contemporary art shown in major museums as political gestures that are not art. In "Rethinking Art Education," chapter 8 of her book Who Says That's Art?, she focuses on two trends in the field that she thinks "should be of concern to thoughtful citizens, even to those with little interest in art." For example, an opinion piece by her in the Wall Street Journal was critical of Judi Werthein's Brinco—a "performance art" piece that consisted mainly of Werthein's passing out specially equipped sneakers to illegal immigrants—which had been recommended for study by a prominent art educator in an NAEA conference session.

== Special education ==
Art education was combined with special education even before there were reforms to create special accommodations for children with special needs in typical classrooms. When it comes to art, art therapists are often used to connect with students with special needs. However, some art therapists pull students out of the classroom, causing them to fall behind in their other schoolwork such as math, English, and science. Because of this, art therapy is reserved for students who do not have much chance for long-term improvements, but rather short-term developmental skills, or for those who seek to increase their all-round capabilities.

Special educator Jean Lokerson and art educator Amelia Jones wrote that "the art room is a place where learning disabilities can turn into learning assets." Special needs students often come out of their shells and get enthusiastic about creating. Art is also a way that special educators teach their students fundamentals that they may not even realize.

There are ongoing studies that continue to prove that art and special education go hand in hand. Testing continues to prove that art in any classroom, but especially special education classrooms causes students to be motivated, enthusiastic, and in some cases, even promote learning in other subject areas.

== Current trends in theory and scholarship ==
The domain of art education is broadening to include a wider range of visual and popular culture. Current trends in scholarship employ postmodern and visual culture approaches to art education, consider effects of globalism on the production and interpretation of images and focus renewed interest on issues of creativity. Within the NAEA, research and publications are being geared toward issues of learning, community, advocacy, research and knowledge. Since 2016, the Art Education Research Institute (AERI) has held an annual symposium that supports critical, systematic, empirical, and theoretical research and scholarship that addresses key intellectual and practical issues in the field of art education. AERI seeks to promote a broad range of rigorous research practices and methodologies drawn from the arts, humanities, and social sciences to improve inquiry related to teaching and learning in and through the visual arts.

== See also ==
- Art schools
- Arts in education
- Arts integration
- Arts-based environmental education
- Digital art education
- Museum education
- Performing arts education
- Teaching artist
- Visual Arts
