= Süheyl Batum =

Turkish academic (born 1955)

Prof. Dr. Süheyl Batum

Member of the Grand National Assembly
- In office 12 June 2011 – 7 June 2015
- Constituency: Eskişehir (2011)

Personal details
- Born: Bedii Süheyl Batum; 6 May 1955 (age 71) Istanbul, Turkey
- Party: Republican People's Party (CHP) (2010-2014, 2015-)
- Spouse: Oya Batum
- Education: Paris I Panthéon-Sorbonne (LL.B.); Istanbul University (Dr. jur.)
- Profession: Academic, jurist, politician, columnist

Bedii Süheyl Batum (born 6 May 1955) is a Turkish professor of constitutional law, political scientist, columnist and Kemalist politician who had served as the Member of Parliament for Eskişehir from June 2011 to June 2015. He was the former rector of Bahçeşehir University.

== Biography ==
He is Georgian descent, and was born on 6 May 1955 in Istanbul. Having finished his high school education at Galatasaray High School in 1975, he attended the faculty of law at the University of Paris, and graduated in 1979. Batum received his Doctor of Laws degree in 1986. Following his postdoctoral studies in international law, particularly in human rights, he became professor in 1996. Since 1993, Batum lectured constitutional law at a number of universities in Istanbul such as Istanbul University, Marmara University, Yeditepe University, Istanbul Bilgi University, Galatasaray University and now he is lecturing in Bahçeşehir University. He is now a member of the current Republican People's Party (Turkish: Cumhuriyet Halk Partisi) in Turkey. He was appointed as the Secretary General of the Party. However, surprisingly, he is appointed as the deputy of the party leader.
