= List of college and university agricultural engineering departments =

Below is a listing of known academic programs that offer bachelor's degrees (B.S. or B.S.E. or B.E / B.Tech.) in what ABET terms "agricultural engineering", "biosystems engineering", "biological engineering", or similarly named programs. ABET accredits college and university programs in the disciplines of applied science, computing, engineering, and engineering technology.

== The Americas ==
=== North America ===
Institution	Department	Web site
Auburn University	Biosystems Engineering	www.eng.auburn.edu/
Cal Poly San Luis Obispo	BioResource and Agricultural Engineering	www.brae.calpoly.edu/
Clemson University	Biosystems Engineering	
Cornell University	Biological and Environmental Engineering	bee.cornell.edu/
Dalhousie University	Department of Engineering (Agricultural Campus)	www.dal.ca
Florida A&M University	Biological Systems Engineering	
Iowa State University	Agricultural and Biosystems Engineering	www.abe.iastate.edu/
Kansas State University	Biological and Agricultural Engineering	www.bae.ksu.edu/home
Louisiana State University	Biological and Agricultural Engineering	www.bae.lsu.edu
McGill University	Department of Bioresource Engineering	www.mcgill.ca/bioeng/
Michigan State University	Biosystems and Agricultural Engineering	www.egr.msu.edu/bae/
Mississippi State University	Agricultural and Biological Engineering	www.abe.msstate.edu
North Carolina State University	Biological and Agricultural Engineering	www.bae.ncsu.edu/
North Carolina Agricultural & Technical State University	Chemical, Biological and Bioengineering Department	www.ncat.edu/
North Dakota State University	Agricultural and Biosystems Engineering	www.ndsu.edu/aben/
Ohio State University	Food, Agricultural and Biological Engineering	fabe.osu.edu
Oklahoma State University	Biosystems and Agricultural Engineering	biosystems.okstate.edu
Oregon State University	Biological and Ecological Engineering Department	bee.oregonstate.edu/
Penn State University	Agricultural and Biosystems Engineering	abe.psu.edu/
Purdue University	Agricultural and Biological Engineering	www.purdue.edu/abe
South Dakota State University	Agricultural and Biosystems Engineering	www.sdstate.edu/abe/
Texas A&M University	Biological and Agricultural Engineering	baen.tamu.edu/
University of Arizona	Agricultural and Biosystems Engineering	cals.arizona.edu/abe
University of Arkansas	Biological and Agricultural Engineering	www.baeg.uark.edu/
University of California, Davis	Biological and Agricultural Engineering	bae.engineering.ucdavis.edu/
University of Florida	Agricultural and Biological Engineering	www.abe.ufl.edu/
University of Georgia	Biological and Agricultural Engineering	www.engr.uga.edu
University of Illinois	Agricultural and Biological Engineering	abe.illinois.edu/
University of Kentucky	Biosystems and Agricultural Engineering	
University of Nebraska-Lincoln	Biological Systems Engineering	bse.unl.edu
University of Manitoba	Biosystems Engineering	http://umanitoba.ca/
University of Minnesota	Bioproducts and Biosystems Engineering	www.bbe.umn.edu/
University of Missouri	Biological Engineering	bioengineering.missouri.edu/
University of Saskatchewan	Biosystems Engineering and Soil Science	www.engr.usask.ca
University of Tennessee	Biosystems Engineering & Soil Science	bioengr.ag.utk.edu
University of Wisconsin	Biological Systems Engineering	bse.wisc.edu/
Université Laval	Génie Agroenvironnemental	
Utah State University	Biological Engineering	be.usu.edu
Virginia Polytechnic University	Biological Systems Engineering	www.bse.vt.edu

=== Mexico, Central and South America ===
Institution	Department	Web site
Universidad Nacional Agraria La Molina, Peru	School of Agricultural Engineering	
Universidad Autónoma Chapingo, México	Irrigation, Soils, Plant Science Department	portal.chapingo.mx/irrigacion/
Universidad Autónoma Agraria Antonio Narro, México	Agricultural Engineering	http://www.uaaan.mx/v3/
Universidad de Costa Rica, Costa Rica	Agricultural and Biosystems Engineering	https://www.ingbiosistemas.ucr.ac.cr/
National University of Colombia	Agricultural Engineering	www.ing.unal.edu.co/
Federal University of Grande Dourados, Brazil	Agricultural Engineering	http://portal.ufgd.edu.br/
University of Campinas, Brazil	Agricultural Engineering	www.unicamp.br/unicamp/
University of São Paulo, Brazil	Biosystems Engineering	
Federal University of Viçosa, Brazil	Agricultural Engineering	
Federal University of Lavras, Brazil	Engineering Department	
Federal University of Pelotas, Brazil	Engineering Centre	
Pontifical Catholic University of Chile	Faculty of Agronomy & Forest Engineering	http://agronomia.uc.cl/
University of Concepción (Campus Chillán), Chile	Agricultural Engineering	
Universidad de Buenos Aires, Argentina	Faculty of Agronomy (FAUBA)	
Universidad Nacional de Río Cuarto, Argentina	Faculty of Agronomy and Veterinary (FAV)	
Tribhuwan University (TU), Institute of Engineering (IOE), Purwanchal Campus(Nepali: पूर्वाञ्चल क्याम्पस), Dharan, Nepal	Agricultural Engineering	

== Europe ==
Institution	Department	Web site
Agricultural Engineering	Agricultural Engineering and Technology	http://eng.au.dk/
Agricultural University of Athens, Greece	Natural Resources Management and Agricultural Engineering	http://www.aua.gr/
Aristotle University of Thessaloniki, Greece	Hydraulics, Soil science and Agricultural Engineering	http://www.agro.auth.gr/
Ankara University, Turkey	Agricultural Engineering	agri.ankara.edu.tr
Akdeniz University, Turkey	Agricultural machinery and Technology Engineering	
Atatürk University, Turkey	Agricultural Structures and Irrigation	www.atauni.edu.tr
Ege University, Turkey	Faculty of Agriculture	
ETH Zurich, Switzerland	Agricultural Science	https://www.ethz.ch/
Harran University, Turkey	Agricultural Machinery	ziraat.harran.edu.tr
Harran University, Turkey	Agricultural Structures and Irrigation	ziraat.harran.edu.tr
Namik Kemal University, Turkey	Agricultural Engineering	http://ziraat-en.nku.edu.tr/
University of Bologna, Italy	Agricultural engineering and mechanics	http://www.unibo.it/
Universitat Politècnica de Catalunya, Spain	Agricultural Engineering	http://www.upc.edu/
Leibniz University Hannover, Germany	Water Resources and Environmental Management	http://www.bgt-hannover.de/
University of Hohenheim, Germany	Institute of Agricultural Engineering	www.uni-hohenheim.de/
University of Reading, UK	Agricultural Engineering	http://www.reading.ac.uk/
University of Liège, Belgium	Gembloux Agro-Bio Tech,	
Universiteit Gent, Belgium	Faculty of Bioscience Engineering	
K.U. Leuven, Belgium	Faculty of Bioscience Engineering	www.kuleuven.be/english
Szent Istvan University, Hungary	Faculty of Mechanical Engineering	www.gek.szie.hu
U.C. Louvain, Belgium	Faculty of Bioscience Engineering	
University of Lisbon, Portugal	Instituto Superior de Agronomia	www.isa.utl.pt/ University of Évora, Portugal
University of Algarve, Portugal	Faculty of Sciences and Technology	www.ualg.pt/home/en/curso/1459
University of Trás-os-Montes and Alto Douro, Portugal	Agronomy	http://ecav.utad.pt/vPT/Area2/Departamentos/agronomia
University of Natural Resources and Life Sciences, Austria	Sustainable Agricultural Systems	http://www.boku.ac.at/
University College Dublin, Ireland	Biosystems Engineering	www.ucd.ie/eacollege/biosystems/
University of Debrecen, Hungary	Agricultural Engineering	http://edu.unideb.hu/

== Asia ==
Institution	Department	Web site
University of Anbar	College of Agriculture	https://agriculturecollege.uoanbar.edu.iq/English/index.php
University of Agriculture Faisalabad, Pakistan	Faculty of Agricultural Engineering and Technology	http://web.uaf.edu.pk/
G. S. Mandal's Maharashtra Institute of Technology, Aurangabad, India	Department of Agricultural Engineering, Division of Food and Agricultural Engineering	http://btech.mit.asia/agriculture-engineering/
Hokkaido University, Japan /School of Agriculture/Graduate School of Agriculture/Research Faculty of Agriculture	Department of Bioresource and Environmental Engineering	https://www.agr.hokudai.ac.jp/s/bioresource-and-environmental-engineering
Obihiro University of Agriculture and Veterinary Medicine, Japan	Department of Agro-environmental Science, Division of Environmental and Agricultural Engineering	http://www.obihiro.ac.jp/~doboku/index.html
University of Hama, Syria.	Faculty of Agricultural Engineering	https://hama-univ.edu.sy/newsites/agricultural/
Hirosaki University, Japan	Department Of Agricultural and Environmental Engineering	http://nature.cc.hirosaki-u.ac.jp/department/regional/
Japan, Kitasato University, School of Veterinary Medicine	Division of Environmental Bioscience	https://www.kitasato-u.ac.jp/vmas/faculty/re/index.html
Japan, Iwate University, Faculty of Agriculture	Department of Environmental Sciences	http://news7a1.atm.iwate-u.ac.jp/english/e_env.html
Japan, Miyagi University, School of Project Design	Department of Regional creation science class and Regional Studies course	http://www.myu.ac.jp/site/gakumu/chiiki.html
Japan, Akita Prefectural University, Faculty of Systems Science and Technology	Department of Agribusiness, Agricultural production technology system "Agri Technology Group" and agricultural and rural infrastructure and environmental system "Rural Engineering Group"	https://www.akita-pu.ac.jp/language/EN/intro.html
Japan, Yamagata University, Faculty of Agriculture	Department of Food, Life and Environmental Sciences, Environmental Science and Technology for Water and Land Use	https://www.tr.yamagata-u.ac.jp/~water/course/
Japan, Ibaraki University's College of Agriculture, Course of Regional symbiotic	Department of Regional and Comprehensive Agriculture	http://www.agr.ibaraki.ac.jp/summary/local/local_course.html
Japan, Utsunomiya University, School of Agriculture	Division of Environmental Engineering	http://agri.mine.utsunomiya-u.ac.jp/hpe/depart/04.html
Japan, University of Tsukuba, School of Life and Environmental Sciences	Master's College of Agro-Biological Resource Sciences, Biological resources Science, Biological and Environmental Engineering area	http://www.life.tsukuba.ac.jp/programs/seibutusigen/index.html
Japan, University of Tsukuba, School of Life and Environmental Sciences	Doctor's College of Agro-Biological Resource Sciences, International territorial Technology Development Science, Ecoregions Foundation of Development Studies area	http://www.life.tsukuba.ac.jp/programs/tien/index.html
Japan, University of Tsukuba, Undergraduate School of Life and Environmental Sciences	College of Agro-Biological Resource Sciences, Course of Environmental Engineering	https://www.bres.tsukuba.ac.jp/
The University of Tokyo/Graduate School of Agricultural and Life Sciences and Faculty of Agriculture	Department of Biological and Environmental Engineering/Environmental and Resource Sciences Course, Major in Biological and Environmental Engineering	https://www.a.u-tokyo.ac.jp/
Tokyo University of Agriculture and Technology/Graduate School of Agriculture and Faculty of Agriculture	Graduate School Department of Agricultural and Environmental Engineering / Department of Ecoregion Science, Agricultural and Environmental Engineering Department	http://web.tuat.ac.jp/~ageng/
Tokyo University Of Agriculture/Graduate School of Agriculture and Faculty of Agriculture	Agriculture Graduate School of Agricultural Engineering / Department of Regional Environment Science production environment	http://www.nodai.ac.jp/academics/reg/eng/
Meiji University, School of Agriculture	Department of Agriculture, Production and Environment Engineering course	https://www.meiji.ac.jp/agri/laboratory/index.html
Nihon University (Fujisawa, Kanagawa)/Graduate School of Bioresource Science/College of Bioresource Science	Department of Bioenvironmental and Agricultural Engineering	http://hp.brs.nihon-u.ac.jp/~bae/
Japan, Shinshu University, Faculty of Agriculture	Department of Agriculture (Ina Campus), Division of Forest and Environmental Symbiosis Science	https://www.shinshu-u.ac.jp/faculty/agriculture/english/education/#divForest
Japan, Niigata University, Faculty of Agriculture	Department of Agriculture, Program of Environmental Sciense for Agriculture and Forestry	https://www.agr.niigata-u.ac.jp/english
Japan, Ishikawa Prefectural University, Faculty of Bioresources and Environmental Sciences	Department of Environmental Science	http://www.ishikawa-pu.jp/undergraduate/environmental_science/index.html
Japan, Gifu University, Graduate School of Applied Biological Sciences and Faculty of Applied Biological Sciences	Applied Biological Sciences Department of production environmental science course environment ecology science course	http://www.abios.gifu-u.ac.jp/eng/
Japan, Mie University, School of Agriculture	Symbiotic environment Department of Earth Environmental Design Education, Irrigation, Drainage and Reclamation Engineering Course	http://agri.mine.utsunomiya-u.ac.jp/hpe/depart/04.html
Japan, The University of Shiga Prefecture, School of Environmental Science	Department of Biological Resources Management	https://www.usp.ac.jp/english/gakubu/kankyo/gakka/#seibutsu
Japan, Kyoto University/Graduate School of Agriculture / School of Agriculture	Graduate School Department of Environmental Sciences and Technology /School Department of Environmental Sciences and Technology	https://www.kais.kyoto-u.ac.jp/japanese/undergraduate/dep_agrienv/
Japan, Osaka Prefecture University/College of Life, Environment, and Advanced Sciences/Graduate School of Life and Environmental Sciences	School of Environmental Sciences and Technology, Environmental Resource Management Studies territory	https://www.osakafu-u.ac.jp/en/academics/graduate/g_life_envi/
Japan, Kobe University/Graduate School of Agricultural Science and Faculty of Agriculture	Department of Agricultural Engineering and Economics Production Environmental Engineering course, Regional Environmental Engineering Program	http://www.ans.kobe-u.ac.jp/jyukensei/eng/
Japan, Kindai University,(Nara Campus) Graduate School & Undergraduate Faculty of Agriculture	Department of Environmental Management	https://www.kindai.ac.jp/english/academics/undergraduate/agriculture/
Japan, Okayama University, Graduate School & Undergraduate Faculty of Agriculture	Department of Environmental Sciences and Technology	http://www.est.okayama-u.ac.jp/index_e.html
Japan, Tottori University, Graduate School & Undergraduate Faculty of Faculty of Agriculture	Department of Agriculture, Life and Environmental Science, International Arid Land Agriculture course	http://muses.muses.tottori-u.ac.jp/subject/leas/course/kansou/
Japan, Shimane University, Graduate School & Undergraduate Faculty of Life and Environmental Science	Department of Symbiotic Science, Regional Engineering Course	http://www.ess.shimane-u.ac.jp/course/pg160.html
Japan, Ehime University, Graduate School & Undergraduate Faculty of Agriculture	Department of Science and Technology for Biological Resources and Environment, Course of Rural Engineering	http://www.agr.ehime-u.ac.jp/en/faculty-department/biological-environment/bre02.html
Japan, Kochi University, Graduate School & Undergraduate Faculty of Agriculture and Marine Sciences(Mononobe Campus)	Department of Agriculture, Forestry, Bioresource and Environmental Sciences, Production environment management science area	http://www.kochi-u.ac.jp/agrimar/english/graduate/index.html
Japan, Kyushu University, Graduate School & Undergraduate Faculty of Agriculture	Category A: Agricultural Resources, Engineering and Economics	http://www.agr.kyushu-u.ac.jp/
Japan, Saga University, Graduate School & Undergraduate Faculty of Agriculture	Agro-Environmental Sciences, Agro-Environmental Conservation	http://www.ag.saga-u.ac.jp/
Japan, University of Miyazaki, Graduate School & Undergraduate Faculty of Agriculture	Department of Agricultural and Environmental Sciences/Department of Forest and Environmental Sciences(a part)	http://www.agr.miyazaki-u.ac.jp/english/
Japan, Kagoshima University, Graduate School & Undergraduate Faculty of Agriculture	School of Environmental Sciences and Technology, Environmental Resource Management Studies territory	http://ace1.agri.kagoshima-u.ac.jp/en/
Japan, University of the Ryukyus, Graduate School & Undergraduate Faculty of Agriculture	Department of Regional Agricultural Engineering, Course of Biosystems Engineering, Course of Rural Environmental Engineering	https://web.archive.org/web/20190319192145/http://www.u-ryukyu.ac.jp/en/mains/faculties/faculty_agr.php
Tamil Nadu Agricultural University, India	Agricultural Engineering	https://sites.google.com/a/tnau.ac.in/aecrikum/ https://sites.google.com/a/tnau.ac.in/aecri-cbe/
CCS Haryana Agricultural University, Hisar, India	Agricultural Engineering	https://web.archive.org/web/20160414224944/http://www.hau.ernet.in/coaet/coaet.php
KCAET, Kerala Agricultural University	Agricultural Engineering	https://kcaet.ac.in/
Nims University, Jaipur, India	Agricultural Engineering	https://web.archive.org/web/20160813023642/http://nimsuniversity.org/schools/nims-engineering-technology-schools/nims-school-of-agricultural-engineering/
IIT KHARAGPUR	Agricultural Engineering	http://www.agri.iitkgp.ernet.in/
Tribhuvan University-Institute Of Engineering–Purwanchal Campus, Dharan, Nepal	Agricultural Engineering	http://www.ioepc.edu.np/, https://www.ioepc.edu.np/agricultural-engineering/
North Eastern Regional Institute of Science and Technology, India	Agricultural Engineering	http://www.nerist.ac.in
Acharya N G Ranga Agricultural University, Bapatla, India	Agricultural Engineering and Technology	www.caebapatla.co.in
Punjab Agricultural University, Ludhiana, Punjab, India	Agricultural Engineering	
G.B. Pant University of Agriculture & Technology, Pantnagar	Agricultural Engineering	
Nagaland University	Agricultural Engineering and Technology	
China Agricultural University	Agricultural Engineering	english.cau.edu.cn/col/col5470/index.html
Northwest Agriculture and Forestry University, China	Agricultural Soil and Water Engineering	en.nwsuaf.edu.cn/
Shanghai Jiatong University, China	Biological Engineering; Food Science and Engineering	en.sjtu.edu.cn/academics/undergraduate-programs/
Xi’an Jiaotong University, China	Energy and Power Engineering	nd.xjtu.edu.cn/web/English.htm
Yunnan Agricultural University, China	Agricultural Water-Soil Engineering	www.at0086.com/YUNNAU
Zhejiang University, China	Biosystems Engineering and Food Science	www.caefs.zju.edu.cn/en/index.asp
Odisha University of Agriculture & Technology	Agricultural Engineering	
Sam Higginbottom University of Agriculture and Technology, Allahabad, India	Agricultural, Water, Resources, Food, and Energy Engineering	http://shuats.edu.in/
Universiti Putra Malaysia, Malaysia	Agricultural and Biosystems Engineering	
Institut Teknologi Sumatera, Indonesia	Biosystem Engineering	
IPB University, Indonesia	Agricultural and Biosystems Engineering	http://fateta.ipb.ac.id/ https://tmb.ipb.ac.id/
Universitas Gadjah Mada, Indonesia	Agricultural and Biosystems Engineering	
University of Southeastern Philippines	Agricultural Engineering	
Bangladesh Agricultural University	Agricultural Engineering and Food Engineering	
Sylhet Agricultural University	Agricultural Engineering and Technology	
Hajee Mohammad Danesh Science & Technology University, Dinajpur, Bangladesh	Agricultural Engineering	
University of Agricultural Sciences, Bengaluru, Karnataka, India	Agricultural Engineering	www.uasbangalore.edu.in
University of agricultural sciences, Raichur, Karnataka, India	Agricultural Engineering	http://uasraichur.edu.in/index.php/en/
Southern Philippines Agri-Business and Marine and Aquatic School of Technology, Digos City, Davao del Sur	Agricultural Engineering	
Xavier University – Ateneo de Cagayan, Cagayan de Oro City, Philippines	Agricultural Engineering	http://www.xu.edu.ph/
Khyber Pakhtunkhwa University of Engineering and Technology, Peshawar Pakistan	Agricultural Engineering, Soil and Water Conservation Engineering, Farm Machinery	
King Mongkut's Institute of Technology Ladkrabang (KMITL), Bangkok, Thailand	Agricultural Engineering	
Central Mindanao University – Maramag, Bukidnon	Agricultural Engineering	http://www.cmu.edu.ph/
A. S. ENGINEERING ENTERPRISE – RAMRAJATALA,	HOWRAH Agricultural Equipment	http://www.asagroups.com/
Central Luzon State University (CLSU)	Agricultural and Biosystems Engineering	http://www.cenclsu.ph/
PJTS Agricultural University, Hyderabad	Agricultural Engineering	http://www.pjtsau.ac.in
Bahawal-din-Zakriya University Multan, Pakistan (BZU)	Agricultural Engineering	https://www.bzu.edu.pk/
Universiti Malaysia Perlis, Malaysia	Biosystems Engineering	https://bioprocess.unimap.edu.my/index.php/academic/undergraduate-programmes/19-biosystems-engineering-undergraduate
Sindh Agriculture university tandojaam	Agricultural Engineering	sau.edu.pk

== Oceania ==
Institution	Department	Web site
University of Southern Queensland, Australia	School of Civil Engineering and Surveying, Faculty of Health, Engineering and Sciences	www.usq.edu.au
Flinders University, Australia	School of Computer Science, Engineering and Mathematics	flinders.edu.au

== Africa ==
Institution	Department	Web site
University of Nigeria, Nigeria	Department of Agricultural and Bioresource Engineering, Faculty of Engineering	www.unn.edu.ng
Makerere University, Uganda	Department of Agricultural and Bio-Systems Engineering	
