= Biological systems engineering =

Engineering discipline

Products of biological systems engineering

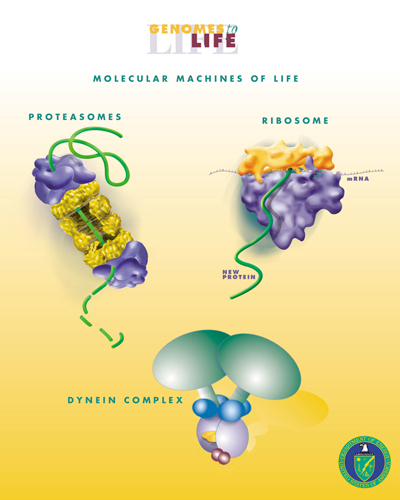
Some biological molecular machines

Biological systems engineering or biosystems engineering is a broad-based engineering discipline with particular emphasis on non-medical biology. It can be thought of as a subset of the broader notion of biological engineering or bio-technology though not in the respects that pertain to biomedical engineering as biosystems engineering tends to focus less on medical applications than on agriculture, ecosystems, and food science. The discipline focuses broadly on environmentally sound and sustainable engineering solutions to meet societies' ecologically related needs. Biosystems engineering integrates the expertise of fundamental engineering fields with expertise from non-engineering disciplines.

== Background and organization ==
Many college and university biological engineering departments have a history of being grounded in agricultural engineering and have only in the past two decades or so changed their names to reflect the movement towards more diverse biological based engineering programs. This major is sometimes called agricultural and biological engineering, biological and environmental engineering, etc., in different universities, generally reflecting interests of local employment opportunities.

Since biological engineering covers a wide spectrum, many departments now offer specialization options. Depending on the department and the specialization options offered within each program, curricula may overlap with other related fields. There are a number of different titles for BSE-related departments at various universities. The professional societies commonly associated with many Biological Engineering programs include the American Society of Agricultural and Biological Engineers (ASABE) and the Institute of Biological Engineering (IBE), which generally encompasses BSE. Some program also participate in the Biomedical Engineering Society (BMES) and the American Institute of Chemical Engineers (AIChE).

A biological systems engineer has a background in what both environmental engineers and biologists do, thus bridging the gap between engineering and the (non-medical) biological sciences – although this is variable across academic institutions. For this reason, biological systems engineers are becoming integral parts of many environmental engineering firms, federal agencies, and biotechnology industries. A biological systems engineer will often address the solution to a problem from the perspective of employing living systems to enact change. For example, biological treatment methodologies can be applied to provide access to clean drinking water or for sequestration of carbon dioxide.

== Specializations ==
- Land and water resources engineering
- Food engineering and bioprocess engineering
- Machinery systems engineering
- Natural resources and environmental engineering
- Biomedical engineering

== Academic programs in agricultural and biological systems engineering ==
Below is a listing of known academic programs that offer bachelor's degrees (B.S. or B.S.E.) in what ABET and/or ASABE terms "agricultural engineering", "biological systems engineering", "biological engineering", or similarly named programs. ABET accredits college and university programs in the disciplines of applied science, computing, engineering, and engineering technology. ASABE defines accredited programs within the scope of Ag/Bio Engineering.

=== North America ===
Institution	Program	Web site
Auburn University	Biosystems Engineering	www.eng.auburn.edu/
CalPoly San Louis Obispo	BioResource and Agricultural Engineering	www.brae.calpoly.edu/
California State University, Bakersfield	BioResource and Agricultural Engineering	
Clemson University	Biosystems Engineering	
Colorado State University	Chemical and Biological Engineering	
Cornell University	Biological Engineering	bee.cornell.edu/
Cornell University	Environmental Engineering	bee.cornell.edu/
Dalhousie University	Engineering	www.dal.ca
Florida A&M University	Biological Systems Engineering	
Illinois Institute of Technology	Chemical Engineering/Food Process Engineering	
Iowa State University	Agricultural Engineering	www.abe.iastate.edu/
Iowa State University	Biological Systems Engineering	www.abe.iastate.edu/
Kansas State University	Biological Systems Engineering	www.bae.ksu.edu/home
Laval University	Agri-Environmental Engineering	
Laval University	Food Engineering	
Louisiana State University	Biological and Agricultural Engineering	www.bae.lsu.edu
Massachusetts Institute of Technology	Chemical-Biological Engineering	www.be.mit.edu
McGill University	Environmental Engineering	www.mcgill.ca/bioeng/
Mercer University School of Engineering	Bioresource Engineering	
Michigan State University	Biosystems Engineering	www.egr.msu.edu/bae/
Mississippi State University	Biological Engineering	www.abe.msstate.edu
Mississippi State University	Biomedical Engineering	www.abe.msstate.edu
Montana State University	Biological Engineering	
Montana State University	Civil Engineering	
Montana State University	Environmental Engineering	
North Carolina State University	Biological Engineering	www.bae.ncsu.edu/
North Carolina Agricultural & Technical State University	Biological Engineering	
North Dakota State University	Agricultural and Biosystems Engineering	www.ndsu.edu/aben/
Northern Kentucky University	Biosystems Engineering	
Oklahoma State University	Biosystems Engineering	biosystems.okstate.edu
Oregon State University	Ecological Engineering	bee.oregonstate.edu/
Oregon State University	Forest Engineering	bee.oregonstate.edu/
Penn State University	Biological Engineering	abe.psu.edu/
Purdue University	Agricultural Engineering	www.purdue.edu/abe
Purdue University	Biological Engineering	www.purdue.edu/abe
Rutgers University	Bioenvironmental Engineering	
State University of New York College of Environmental Science and Forestry	Bioprocess Engineering	
State University of New York College of Environmental Science and Forestry	Environmental Resources Engineering	
South Dakota School of Mines and Technology	Bioprocess and Biochemical Engineering	
South Dakota State University	Chemical and Biological Engineering	www.sdstate.edu/abe/
Texas A&M University	Biological and Agricultural Engineering	baen.tamu.edu/
Ohio State University	Agricultural Engineering	fabe.osu.edu
Ohio State University	Food, Biological, and Ecological Engineering	fabe.osu.edu
University of Alabama	Biological Engineering	
University of Arizona	Agricultural and Biosystems Engineering	cals.arizona.edu/abe
University of Arkansas	Biological Engineering	www.baeg.uark.edu/
University of California, Davis	Biological and Agricultural Engineering	bae.engineering.ucdavis.edu/
University of Colorado at Boulder	Chemical and Biological Engineering	
University of Florida	Agricultural and Biological Engineering	www.abe.ufl.edu/
University of Guelph	Biological Engineering	
University of Guelph	Environmental Engineering	
University of Guelph	Water Resources Engineering	
University of Georgia	Agricultural Engineering	www.engr.uga.edu
University of Georgia	Biological Engineering	www.engr.uga.edu
University of Hawaii at Manoa	Biological Engineering	
University of Idaho	Biological Engineering	uidaho.edu/
University of Idaho	Environmental Engineering	uidaho.edu/
University of Illinois	Agricultural and Biological Engineering	abe.illinois.edu/
University of Kentucky	Biosystems Engineering	jokko.bae.uky.edu/BAEHome.asp
University of Nebraska–Lincoln	Agricultural Engineering	bse.unl.edu
University of Nebraska–Lincoln	Biological Systems Engineering	bse.unl.edu
University of Nebraska–Lincoln	Environmental Engineering	bse.unl.edu
University of Maine	Bioengineering	
University of Manitoba	Biosystems Engineering	http://umanitoba.ca/
University of Maryland	Bioengineering	
University of Minnesota	Bioproducts and Biosystems Engineering	www.bbe.umn.edu/
University of Missouri	Biological Engineering	bioengineering.missouri.edu/
University of Puerto Rico	Agricultural and Biosystems Engineering	
University of Saskatchewan	Biological Engineering	
University of Saskatchewan	Chemical Engineering	
University of Tennessee	Biosystems Engineering	bioengr.ag.utk.edu
University of Washington	Bioresource Science & Engineering	
University of Wisconsin	Biological Systems Engineering	bse.wisc.edu/
Utah State University	Biological Engineering	be.usu.edu
Virginia Polytechnic University	Biological Systems Engineering	www.bse.vt.edu
Washington State University	Biological Systems Engineering	bsyse.wsu.edu

=== Central and South America ===
Institution	Department	Web site
Escuela Superior Politécnica del Litoral	Food Industry Engineering	
Federal Institute of São Paulo (Campus of Avaré), Brazil	Biosystems Engineering	
Federal University of Campina Grande, Brazil	Biosystems Engineering	
Instituto Tecnologico y de Estudios Superiores de Monterrey	Food Industry Engineering	
National University of Colombia	Agricultural Engineering	
Universidad Autónoma Chapingo, Mexico	Irrigation Department	portal.chapingo.mx/irrigacion/
Universidad Autonoma de San Luis Potosi	Food Engineering	
Universidad de Costa Rica, Costa Rica	Agricultural and Biosystems Engineering	
University of Campinas, Brazil	Agricultural Engineering	
Universidad de Cartagena	Food Engineering	
Universidad de las Américas Puebla	Food Industry Engineering	
Universidad Autonoma de Nuevo Leon	Food Industry Engineering	
University of São Paulo (Campus of Piracicaba), Brazil	Biosystems Engineering	
University of São Paulo (Campus of Pirassununga), Brazil	Biosystems Engineering	
São Paulo State University (Campus of Tupã), Brazil	Biosystems Engineering	

=== Europe ===
Institution	Department
KU Leuven, Belgium	Department of Biosystems
University of Liege, Belgium	Biosystem engineering
Aarhus University, Denmark	Faculty of Agricultural Sciences
Humboldt-Universität Berlin, Germany	Biosystems Engineering
Leibniz University Hannover, Germany	Biosystems and Horticultural Engineering,
University of Hohenheim, Germany	Agricultural Engineering
Technological Institute Of Larissa, Greece	Biosystems Engineering Mechanics, Agricultural, Food Science and Engineering, Biorobotics
University College Dublin, Ireland	Biosystems Engineering
University of Maribor, Slovenia	Faculty of Agriculture and Life Sciences
Technical University of Madrid, Spain	Agricultural, Food and Biosystems Engineering
UPC-BarcelonaTech, Spain	Agri-Food and Biosystems Engineering
Wageningen University and Research Centre, The Netherlands	Biosystems Engineering
Alanya Alaaddin Keykubat University, Turkey	Biosystems Engineering
Aydın Adnan Menderes University, Turkey	Biosystems Engineering
Bilecik Şeyh Edebali University, Turkey	Agricultural Engineering
Bilecik Şeyh Edebali University, Turkey	Biosystems Engineering
Bingöl University, Turkey	Biosystems Engineering
Bursa Uludağ University, Turkey	Biosystems Engineering
Düzce University, Turkey	Biosystems Engineering
Erciyes University, Turkey	Biosystems Engineering
Hatay Mustafa Kemal University, Turkey	Biosystems Engineering
Iğdır University, Turkey	Biosystems Engineering
Kahramanmaraş Sütçü İmam University, Turkey	Biosystems Engineering
Kırşehir Ahi Evran University, Turkey	Biosystems Engineering
Necmettin Erbakan University, Turkey	Biosystems Engineering
Niğde Ömer Halisdemir University, Turkey	Biosystems Engineering
Tekirdağ Namık Kemal University, Turkey	Biosystems Engineering
Tokat Gaziosmanpaşa University, Turkey	Biosystems Engineering
Van Yüzüncü Yıl University, Turkey	Biosystems Engineering

=== Asia ===
Institution	Department
Universitas Gadjah Mada, Indonesia	Agricultural and Biosystems Engineering
China Agricultural University	Agricultural Engineering
Northwest Agriculture and Forestry University, China	Agricultural Soil and Water Engineering
Shanghai Jiatong University, China	Biological Engineering; Food Science and Engineering
Xi’an Jiaotong University, China	Energy and Power Engineering
Yunnan Agricultural University, China	Agricultural Water-Soil Engineering
Zhejiang University, China	Biosystems Engineering and Food Science
National Taiwan University	Bioenvironmental Systems Engineering
Bogor Agricultural University	Mechanical dan Biosystem Engineering
Arak University	Biosystems Engineering
Tarbiat Modares University, Islamic Republic of Iran	Biosystems Engineering
University of Tehran, Islamic Republic of Iran	Mechanical Engineering of Biosystems
Ferdowsi University of Mashhad, Iran	Mechanical Engineering of Biosystems
University of Tabriz, Islamic Republic of Iran	Biosystems Engineering
Uva Wellassa University of Sri Lanka	Biosystems Technology
Gorgan University of agricultural sciences and natural resources, Islamic Republic of Iran	Biosystems Engineering Department
Wayamba University of Sri Lanka	Biosystems Engineering Department
Institut Teknologi Sumatera, Indonesia	Biosystems Engineering
Kyungpook National University (KNU), Korea	Bio-Industrial Machinery Engineering
Chungnam National University (CNU), Korea	Biosystems Machinery Engineering
Seoul National University (SNU), Korea	Biosystems Engineering
Kangwon National University (KNU), Korea	Biosystems Engineering
Kahramanmaras Sutcu Imam University	Agricultural Biosystem and Mechanical Engineering
University of Sumatera Utara (USU)	Agriculture and Biosystem Engineering
Holy Spirit University of Kaslik	Agricultural Engineering
Mapua University	Biological Engineering
Mapua Institute of Technology	Biological Engineering
Tribhuvan University (TU, IOEPC), Nepal	Agricultural Engineering
Centre for BioSystems Science and Engineering (BSSE), Indian Institute of Science (IISc), India	Biological Systems Science and Engineering
Plaksha University (), India	Biological Systems Engineering

=== Africa ===
Institution	Department
Hawassa University, Ethiopia	Biosystems Engineering
Ambo University, Ethiopia	Agricultural and Bioprocess Engineering
Haramaya University, Ethiopia	Agricultural Engineering
Adama University, Ethiopia	Agricultural Engineering
University of Nairobi, Kenya	Environmental and Biosystems Engineering
Jomo Kenyatta University of Agriculture and Technology, Kenya	Agricultural and Biosystems Engineering
Gulu University, Uganda	Biosystems Engineering

== See also ==
Related engineering fields

- Agricultural engineering
- Aquaculture engineering
- Biological engineering
- Biomedical engineering
- Civil engineering
- Chemical engineering
- Ecological engineering
- Environmental engineering
- Food engineering
- Hydraulic engineering
- Mechanical engineering
- Sanitary engineering

Closely related sciences

- Agriculture
- Animal Science
- Biology, Biochemistry, Microbiology
- Chemistry
- Ecology
- Environmental science
- Forestry
- Horticulture
- Hydrology
- Plant Science
- Soil science
