= Bozcaarmut, Pazaryeri =

Bozcaarmut
- Village
- Location within Turkey Location within Marmara
- Coordinates: 39.9778°N 29.7693°E
- Country: Turkey
- Province: Bilecik
- District: Pazaryeri
- Population (2021): 217
- Time zone: UTC+3 (TRT)

Bozcaarmut is a village in the Pazaryeri District, Bilecik Province, Turkey. Its population is 217 (2021).
