= Demirköy, Pazaryeri =

Demirköy
- Village
- Location within Turkey Location within Marmara
- Country: Turkey
- Province: Bilecik
- District: Pazaryeri
- Population (2021): 294
- Time zone: UTC+3 (TRT)

Demirköy is a village in the Pazaryeri District, Bilecik Province, Turkey. Its population is 294 (2021).
