= Kamhi =

Kamhi is a surname. Notable people with the surname include:

- Katherine Kamhi (born 1964), American actress
- Michelle Marder Kamhi (born 1937), American scholar and arts critic
- Rafael Moshe Kamhi (1870–1970), Macedonian liaison officer
- Victoria Kamhi (1905–1997), Turkish pianist
