= Ahmetler, Pazaryeri =

Ahmetler
- Village
- Location within Turkey Location within Marmara
- Coordinates: 40.0231°N 29.9490°E
- Country: Turkey
- Province: Bilecik
- District: Pazaryeri
- Population (2021): 304
- Time zone: UTC+3 (TRT)

Ahmetler is a village in the Pazaryeri District, Bilecik Province, Turkey. Its population is 304 (2021).
