= Kınık, Pazaryeri =

Kınık
- Village
- Location within Turkey Location within Marmara
- Coordinates: 40.0109°N 29.8279°E
- Country: Turkey
- Province: Bilecik
- District: Pazaryeri
- Population (2021): 250
- Time zone: UTC+3 (TRT)

Kınık is a village in the Pazaryeri District, Bilecik Province, Turkey. Its population is 250 (2021).
