= Bahçesultan, Pazaryeri =

Bahçesultan
- Village
- Location within Turkey Location within Marmara
- Coordinates: 40°02′N 29°46′E
- Country: Turkey
- Province: Bilecik
- District: Pazaryeri
- Population (2021): 73
- Time zone: UTC+3 (TRT)

Bahçesultan is a village in the Pazaryeri District, Bilecik Province, Turkey. Its population is 73 (2021).
