= Fıranlar, Pazaryeri =

Fıranlar
- Village
- Location within Turkey Location within Marmara
- Coordinates: 39°58′14″N 29°57′19″E
- Country: Turkey
- Province: Bilecik
- District: Pazaryeri
- Population (2021): 172
- Time zone: UTC+3 (TRT)

Fıranlar (also: Fırınlar) is a village in the Pazaryeri District, Bilecik Province, Turkey. Its population is 172 (2021).
