= Alınca, Pazaryeri =

Alınca
- Village
- Location within Turkey Location within Marmara
- Coordinates: 39.9903°N 29.8073°E
- Country: Turkey
- Province: Bilecik
- District: Pazaryeri
- Population (2021): 39
- Time zone: UTC+3 (TRT)

Alınca is a village in the Pazaryeri District, Bilecik Province, Turkey. Its population is 39 (2021).
