= Dülgeroğlu, Pazaryeri =

Dülgeroğlu
- Village
- Location within Turkey Location within Marmara
- Coordinates: 40°04′N 29°52′E
- Country: Turkey
- Province: Bilecik
- District: Pazaryeri
- Population (2021): 66
- Time zone: UTC+3 (TRT)

Dülgeroğlu is a village in the Pazaryeri District, Bilecik Province, Turkey. Its population is 66 (2021).
