= Karadede, Pazaryeri =

Karadede
- Village
- Location within Turkey Location within Marmara
- Coordinates: 40.0873°N 29.8461°E
- Country: Turkey
- Province: Bilecik
- District: Pazaryeri
- Population (2025): 254
- Time zone: UTC+3 (TRT)

Karadede is a village in the Pazaryeri District, Bilecik Province, Turkey. Its population is 254 (2025).
