= Karaköy, Pazaryeri =

Karaköy
- Village
- Location within Turkey Location within Marmara
- Country: Turkey
- Province: Bilecik
- District: Pazaryeri
- Population (2021): 537
- Time zone: UTC+3 (TRT)

Karaköy is a village in the Pazaryeri District, Bilecik Province, Turkey. Its population is 537 (2021).
