= Günyurdu, Pazaryeri =

Günyurdu
- Village
- Location within Turkey Location within Marmara
- Coordinates: 40.0430°N 29.8439°E
- Country: Turkey
- Province: Bilecik
- District: Pazaryeri
- Population (2021): 179
- Time zone: UTC+3 (TRT)

Günyurdu is a village in the Pazaryeri District, Bilecik Province, Turkey. Its population is 179 (2021).
