= Bulduk, Pazaryeri =

Bulduk
- Village
- Location within Turkey Location within Marmara
- Coordinates: 39.9882°N 29.8337°E
- Country: Turkey
- Province: Bilecik
- District: Pazaryeri
- Population (2021): 62
- Time zone: UTC+3 (TRT)

Bulduk is a village in the Pazaryeri District, Bilecik Province, Turkey. Its population is 62 (2021).
