= Nazifpaşa, Pazaryeri =

Nazifpaşa
- Village
- Location within Turkey Location within Marmara
- Coordinates: 40°02′N 29°45′E
- Country: Turkey
- Province: Bilecik
- District: Pazaryeri
- Population (2021): 46
- Time zone: UTC+3 (TRT)

Nazifpaşa is a village in the Pazaryeri District, Bilecik Province, Turkey. Its population is 46 (2021).
