= Arpadere, Pazaryeri =

Arpadere
- Village
- Location within Turkey Location within Marmara
- Coordinates: 40.0826°N 29.7973°E
- Country: Turkey
- Province: Bilecik
- District: Pazaryeri
- Population (2021): 90
- Time zone: UTC+3 (TRT)

Arpadere is a village in the Pazaryeri District, Bilecik Province, Turkey. Its population is 90 (2021).
