= Pazaryeri =

- Municipality
- Location in Turkey Pazaryeri (Marmara)
- Coordinates: 40°0′N 29°54′E
- Country: Turkey
- Province: Bilecik
- District: Pazaryeri

Government
  - Mayor: Zekiye Tekin (AKP)
- Population (2021): 6,243
- Time zone: UTC+3 (TRT)
- Postal code: 11800
- Area code: 0228
- Website: www.pazaryeri.bel.tr

Pazaryeri, (formerly Ermenı Derbent; lit. 'Armenian Mountain Pass', also Ermenı Pazarcık; lit. 'Armenian Bazaar' and simply as Pazarcık) is a town in Bilecik Province in the Marmara region of Turkey. It is the seat of Pazaryeri District. Its population is 6,243 (2021). The district has several small lakes, as well as a number of buildings in traditional Ottoman style. The mayor is Zekiye Tekin. Pazaryeri is one of the most important hop producers in Turkey. The town has famous local dishes like helva and boza.

== History ==
Several ancient Greek votives and inscriptions dedicated to Zeus Bronton and Apollon Phoibos have been found near the town, where he was heavily worshipped and a cult of them was present. A common cult of two gods was rare in the ancient world. There were several temples dedicated to them. Heracles was also worshipped there. Names of the priests in the temples include: Trophimas, Aleksandros, Asklepiodotos, Askles, Marcus, Sextus and Sosigenos. The cult and the temples remained active until, at least, the 2nd century AD. A Greek metrical epitaph and a bust of a deceased 12-year-old boy called Roufeinos was also discovered in the city. An inscription dedicated to Demeter, one of only two surviving in the administrative district of Iznik (ancient Nicaea), was also found near the city. In Hellenistic times, the city was located in the border of the Kingdom of Bithynia, separating it from Phrygia.

In Byzantine times, the city was known as Armenokastron (Greek: Αρμενόκαστρον; lit. 'Armenian Fortress'). Although the name implies it, there is no record of Armenians living in the city. Armenokastron was one of the most important cities of the Bithynia theme. In the first half of the 12th century, it was captured by the Seljuks, but it was recaptured by the Byzantines during the Second Crusade, subsequently marking the limit of Byzantine hegemony in the East. The modern town was built on this Byzantine settlement, or somewhere near. In Ottoman times, a military road between the city of Iznik and Pazaryeri was built, probably in the beginning of the 16th century. This road probably ran via Köprühisar and Yarhisar towards Pazaryeri.

During the Turkish War of Independence Pazaryeri was completely destroyed by burning by the Greek Army during its advance inland in July 1921. However it suffered atrocities months before its complete destruction. A report of the Western Front Command of the Turkish Army dating 16 February 1921 stated that 24 people were murdered inside the town centre while 16 sheep and 10 goats were also among the casualties. On the 15th of April the 1st Infantry Division Command of the Turkish Army reported that 102 inhabitants were taken prisoners while 4 killed, 6 wounded and a woman raped by the Greek Army. During the burning, Turkish elderly inhabitants who could not flee the town were killed. Second-Lieutenant Pantelis Priniotakis describes the events on his diary dating to 13 July 1921 with the following words:

Our phalanx continued its march towards Pazarcık, which we captured after a short enemy resistance and which our army burned. It was a town of about 3,500 inhabitants, extremely rich and beautiful, and in terms of the way its houses were built of boards and wood, it was completely destroyed by fire in just a few hours. The inhabitants had left the village as soon as they understood that our units were advancing on them, except for a few old people whom they were forced to leave there due to the difficulty of transporting.

— Pantelis Priniotakis

The official result was that 644 buildings, the entire town was destroyed by the Greek Army.

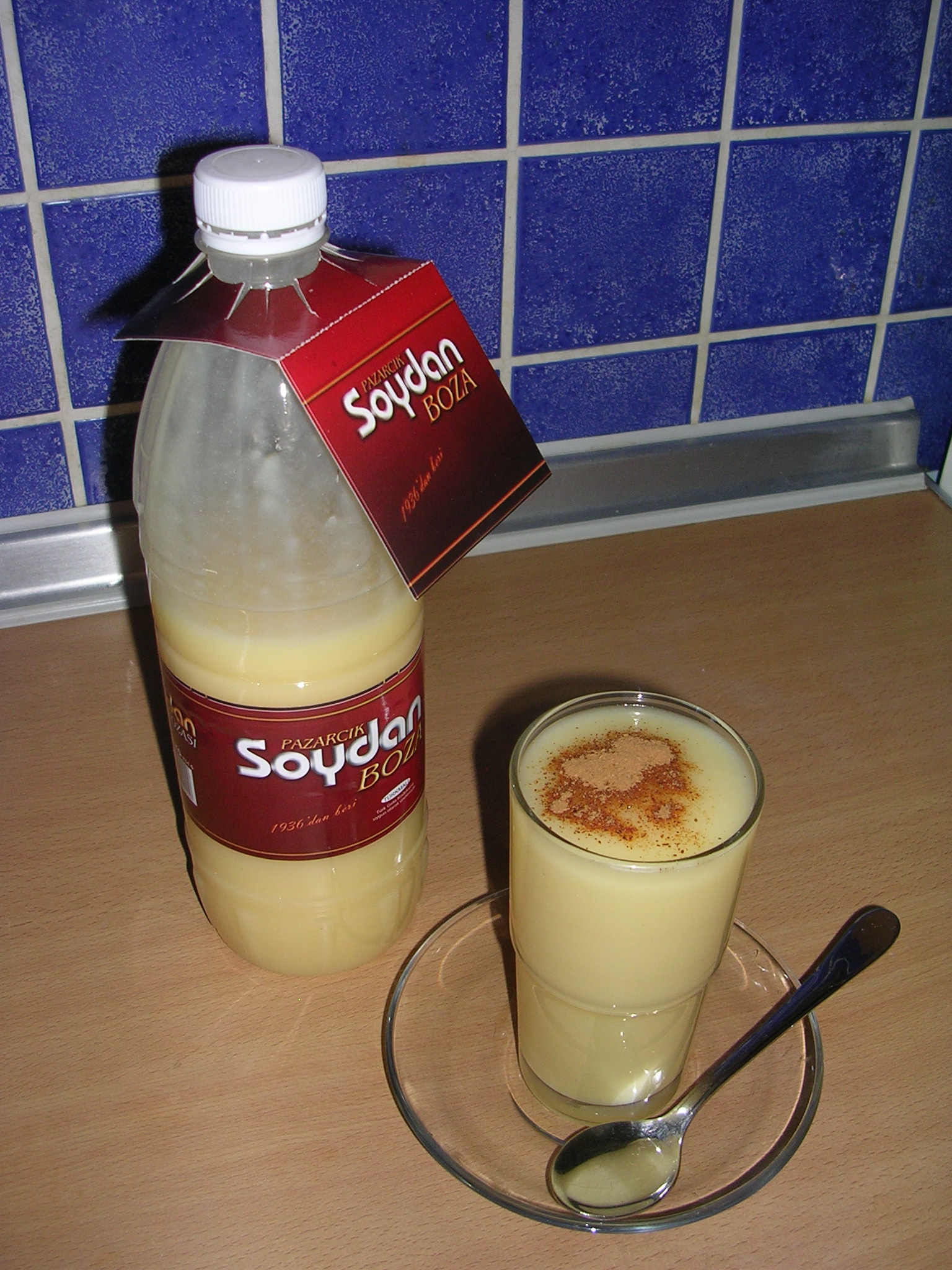
Boza of Pazarcık
