= Sarnıç, Pazaryeri =

Sarnıç
- Village
- Location within Turkey Location within Marmara
- Coordinates: 40.0844°N 29.8281°E
- Country: Turkey
- Province: Bilecik
- District: Pazaryeri
- Population (2021): 31
- Time zone: UTC+3 (TRT)

Sarnıç (also: Sarnıçköy) is a village in the Pazaryeri District, Bilecik Province, Turkey. Its population is 31 (2021).
