= Gümüşdere, Pazaryeri =

Gümüşdere
- Village
- Location within Turkey Location within Marmara
- Coordinates: 40.0222°N 29.8150°E
- Country: Turkey
- Province: Bilecik
- District: Pazaryeri
- Population (2021): 124
- Time zone: UTC+3 (TRT)

Gümüşdere is a village in the Pazaryeri District, Bilecik Province, Turkey. Its population is 124 (2021).
