= Küçükelmalı, Pazaryeri =

Küçükelmalı
- Village
- Location within Turkey Location within Marmara
- Coordinates: 40°01′N 29°48′E
- Country: Turkey
- Province: Bilecik
- District: Pazaryeri
- Population (2021): 141
- Time zone: UTC+3 (TRT)

Küçükelmalı is a village in the Pazaryeri District, Bilecik Province, Turkey. Its population is 141 (2021).
