= Büyükelmalı, Pazaryeri =

Büyükelmalı
- Village
- Location within Turkey Location within Marmara
- Coordinates: 40°03′N 29°48′E
- Country: Turkey
- Province: Bilecik
- District: Pazaryeri
- Population (2021): 93
- Time zone: UTC+3 (TRT)

Büyükelmalı is a village in the Pazaryeri District, Bilecik Province, Turkey. Its population is 93 (2021).
