= Esemen, Pazaryeri =

Esemen
- Village
- Location within Turkey Location within Marmara
- Coordinates: 40°03′N 29°54′E
- Country: Turkey
- Province: Bilecik
- District: Pazaryeri
- Population (2021): 26
- Time zone: UTC+3 (TRT)

Esemen is a village in the Pazaryeri District, Bilecik Province, Turkey. Its population is 26 (2021).
