= Arapdede, Pazaryeri =

Arapdede
- Village
- Location within Turkey Location within Marmara
- Coordinates: 39.9905°N 29.8741°E
- Country: Turkey
- Province: Bilecik
- District: Pazaryeri
- Population (2021): 112
- Time zone: UTC+3 (TRT)

Arapdede is a village in the Pazaryeri District, Bilecik Province, Turkey. Its population is 112 (2021).
