= Güde, Pazaryeri =

Güde
- Village
- Location within Turkey Location within Marmara
- Coordinates: 40.0053°N 29.7670°E
- Country: Turkey
- Province: Bilecik
- District: Pazaryeri
- Population (2021): 153
- Time zone: UTC+3 (TRT)

Güde is a village in the Pazaryeri District, Bilecik Province, Turkey. Its population is 153 (2021).
