= Eskişehir (electoral district) =

Electoral district for the Grand National Assembly of Turkey

Coordinates: 37°50′N 34°45′E

- electoral district for the Grand National Assembly of Turkey
- Eskişehir shown within Turkey
- Province: Eskişehir
- Electorate: 567,274

Current electoral district
- Created: 1923
- Seats: 6
- Turnout at last election: 89.39%
- Representation
- CHP: 3 / 6
- AK Party: 3 / 6

Eskişehir is an electoral district of the Grand National Assembly of Turkey. It elects six members of parliament (deputies) to represent the province of the same name for a four-year term by the D'Hondt method, a party-list proportional representation system.

== Members ==
Population reviews of each electoral district are conducted before each general election, which can lead to certain districts being granted a smaller or greater number of parliamentary seats. Eskişehir has remained relatively stable, electing six MPs since 1999.

MPs for Eskişehir, 1999 onwards
Election	1999 (21st Parliament)	2002 (22nd Parliament)	2007 (23rd Parliament)	2011 (24th Parliament)	June 2015 (25th Parliament)
MP	Mahmut Erdir; DSP	Mehmet Ali Arıkan; CHP	Fehmi Murat Sönmez; CHP	Bedii Süheyl Batum; CHP	Cemal Okan Yüksel; CHP
MP	Mehmet Mail Büyükerman; DSP	Mehmet Cevdet Selvi; CHP	Hüseyin Tayfun İçli; CHP	Kazım Kurt; CHP	Gaye Usluer; CHP
MP	Necati Albay; DSP	Fahri Keskin; AK Party	Kemal Unakıtan; AK Party	Ülker Can; AK Party	Utku Çakırözer; CHP
MP	İbrahim Yaşar Dedelek; ANAP	Hasan Murat Mercan; AK Party		Nabi Avcı; AK Party	
MP	Mehmet Sadri Yıldırım; DYP	Muharrem Tozçöken; AK Party	Emin Nedim Öztürk; AK Party	Salih Koca; AK Party	
MP	Süleyman Servet Sazak; MHP	Mehmet Vedat Yücesan; CHP	Beytullah Asil; MHP	Ruhsar Demirel; MHP	

== General elections ==
=== 2011 ===
2011 general election: Eskişehir
Party	Candidate	Votes	%	±%
AK Party	3 elected 0: 1. Nabi Avcı ✓; 2. Salih Koca ✓; 3. Ülker Can ✓; 4. Cemal Çavdarlı ✗; 5. Ethem Kalın ✗; 6. Ayten Kızılsu ✗	222,254	44.10	▼0.38
CHP	2 elected 0: 1. Bedii Süheyl Batum ✓; 2. Kazım Kurt ✓; 3. Gaye Usluer ✗; 4. Azmi Kerman ✗; 5. Muharrem Şenel ✗; 6. Muharrem Varlık ✗	179,072	35.53	▲10.15
MHP	1 elected 0: 1. Ruhsar Demirel ✓; 2. Mehmet Emin Yeşil ✗; 3. Fatımatüzzehra Kıraç ✗; 4. Lütfiye Öztetik ✗; 5. Mustafa Doyuk ✗; 6. Cemal Dedebağı ✗	73,609	14.60	▼1.01
DP	None elected: 1. Mecit Hazır ✗; 2. Yavuz Yıldız ✗; 3. Fahri Gürgenburan ✗; 4. Metin Eker ✗; 5. Nevin Çelebi ✗; 6. Ömer Gül ✗	5,400	1.07	▼5.99
SAADET	None elected: 1. Fesih Bingöl ✗; 2. Hamdi Özyavuz ✗; 3. Fehime Saran ✗; 4. Muhammet Güney ✗; 5. Halit Öz ✗; 6. Ensar Tuna ✗	4,553	0.90	▼0.70
HAS Party	None elected: 1. Hasan Tahsin Bayraker ✗; 2. Ramazan Güngören ✗; 3. Muharrem Akaydın ✗; 4. Ümit Aslaner ✗; 5. Süleyman Kuzu ✗; 6. Mahmut Özkeçeci ✗	4,202	0.83	▲0.83
Büyük Birlik	None elected: 1. Yusuf Ziya Akdoğan ✗; 2. Kadir Kılınçal ✗; 3. Muhsin Başaran ✗; 4. Leman Başol ✗; 5. Hasan Akyıldız ✗; 6. Tuğba Arıcı ✗	3,622	0.72	▲0.72
Independent	None elected: Ahmet Uluçelebi ✗ Ahmet Yılmaz ✗ Hasan Yalçınkaya ✗ Nermin Yıldız ✗	2,833	0.56	▲0.39
HEPAR	None elected: 1. Hasan Hüseyin Kısaoğlu ✗; 2. Olcay Yılmaz Damar ✗; 3. İsmet Demir ✗; 4. Faruk Uğur ✗; 5. Yusuf Yazgıç ✗; 6. Serdar Aydın ✗	2,601	0.52	▲0.52
DSP	None elected: 1. Osman Çoban ✗; 2. Hüdaver Bekler ✗; 3. Ali Turna ✗; 4. Burhan Mermer ✗; 5. Esra Özmen ✗; 6. Seçkin Yörükçü ✗	2,537	0.50	N/A
Labour	None elected: 1. Hüseyin Öge ✗; 2. Gürsel Şenşafak ✗; 3. Arif Kilitçioğlu ✗; 4. Gülnur Keser ✗; 5. Yasemin Özçay ✗; 6. Ülker Alkın ✗	1,265	0.25	▲0.02
TKP	None elected: 1. Mustafa Kenan Aybastı ✗; 2. Özgür Özlem Öngel ✗; 3. Gülüstan Kalik ✗; 4. Uğur Demir ✗; 5. Aylin Aslan ✗; 6. Merve Uzuner ✗	797	0.16	▲0.01
MP	None elected: 1. Celalettin Başer ✗; 2. Mehmet Güngör ✗; 3. Metin Erdoğan ✗; 4. Bayram Ali Bekmez ✗; 5. Ertuğrul Şakar ✗; 6. Mehmet Ateş ✗	552	0.11	▲0.11
Nationalist Conservative	None elected: 1. Vural Köseoğlu ✗; 2. Emin Çınar ✗; 3. Şengül Kocabıyık ✗; 4. Metin Tüysüz ✗; 5. Nuri Yüksel ✗; 6. Ömer Toktaş ✗	519	0.10	▲0.10
Liberal Democrat	None elected: 1. Muhterem Siviş ✗; 2. Beril Eski ✗; 3. İbrahim Murad Ilgıcıoğlu ✗; 4. Fahri Demir ✗; 5. Haydar Muharrem Uz ✗; 6. Ferhat Yanar ✗	217	0.04	▼0.10
DYP	No candidates	0	0.00	0.00
Total votes		504,033	100.00	
Rejected ballots		12,655	2.46	▲0.81
Turnout		515,119	89.39	▲1.24
AK Party hold Majority		43,182	8.57	▼10.53

== Presidential elections ==
=== 2014 ===
2014 presidential election: Eskişehir
Party	Candidate	Votes	%
Independent	Ekmeleddin İhsanoğlu	245,486	51.95
AK Party	Recep Tayyip Erdoğan	214,636	45.42
HDP	Selahattin Demirtaş	12,460	2.64
Total votes		472,582	100.00
Rejected ballots		9,002	1.87
Turnout		481,584	79.85
Ekmeleddin İhsanoğlu win			
