= Pazaryeri District =

District of Bilecik Province, Turkey

- District
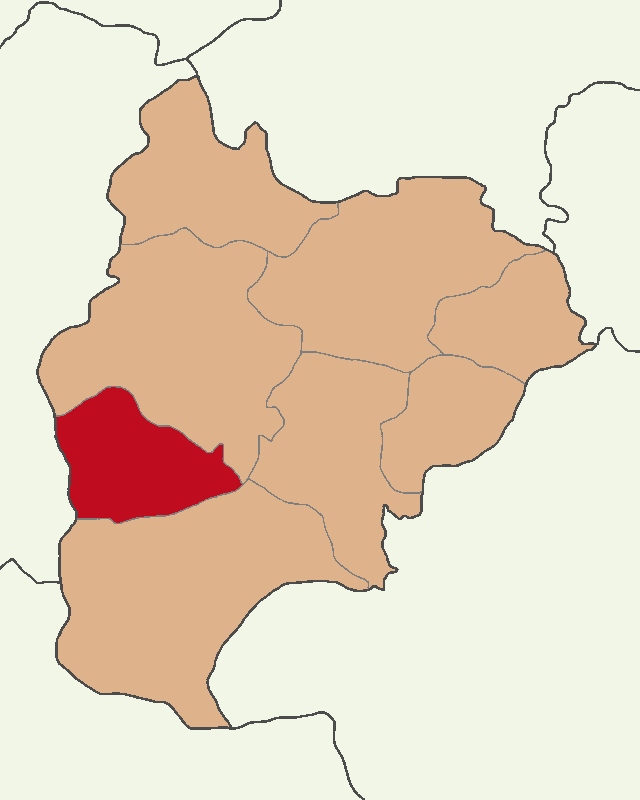
- Map showing Pazaryeri District in Bilecik Province

- Location in Turkey Pazaryeri District (Marmara)
- Coordinates: 40°0′N 29°54′E
- Country: Turkey
- Province: Bilecik
- Seat: Pazaryeri

Government
  - Kaymakam: Ferhat Altay
- Area: 324 km^{2} (125 sq mi)
- Population (2021): 10,032
  - Density: 31/km^{2} (80/sq mi)
- Time zone: UTC+3 (TRT)
- Website: www.pazaryeri.gov.tr

Pazaryeri District is a district of Bilecik Province of Turkey. Its seat is the town Pazaryeri. Its area is 324 km^{2}, and its population is 10,032 (2021).

== Composition ==
There is one municipality in Pazaryeri District:

- Pazaryeri

There are 24 villages in Pazaryeri District:

- Ahmetler
- Alınca
- Arapdede
- Arpadere
- Bahçesultan
- Bozcaarmut
- Bulduk
- Burçalık
- Büyükelmalı
- Demirköy
- Dereköy
- Dülgeroğlu
- Esemen
- Fıranlar
- Güde
- Gümüşdere
- Günyurdu
- Karadede
- Karaköy
- Kınık
- Küçükelmalı
- Nazifpaşa
- Sarıdayı
- Sarnıç
