= Iğdır University =

Public university in Iğdır, Turkey

Igdır University
- Established: 2008
- Location: Iğdır, Turkey
- Website: Official website

Iğdır University (Turkish: Iğdır Üniversitesi) is a university located in Iğdır, Turkey. It was established in 2008.

== History ==
Iğdır University was formerly known as the Iğdır Vocational School (Turkish: Iğdır Meslek Yüksekokulu) under Kafkas University. The vocational school was established in 1995. The school initially started as a business administration department.

Efforts for founding an agricultural faculty in Iğdır had started in 2001 and in 2006 the faculty was founded as Iğdır Faculty of Agriculture (Turkish: Iğdır Ziraat Fakültesi).

== Academics ==
=== Faculties ===
- Faculty of Agriculture
- Faculty of Theology
- Faculty of Engineering
- Faculty of Economics and Administrative Sciences
- Faculty of Applied Sciences
- Faculty of Dentistry
- Faculty of Sports Sciences
- Faculty of Health Sciences
- Faculty of Letters
- Faculty of Fine Arts
- Faculty of Sports Sciences

=== Institutes ===
- Graduate School of Natural Sciences
- Graduate School of Fine Arts
- Graduate School of Health Sciences

=== Vocational Schools ===
- Iğdır Vocational School
- Tuzluca Vocational School
- Vocational School of Health Services
- Vocational School of Technical Sciences

=== Schools ===
- School of Applied Sciences
- School of Physical Education and Sports

== Affiliations ==
The university is a member of the Caucasus University Association and also participates in the Erasmus Programme.
