= Olivia Gude =

American artist and educator (born 1950)

Olivia Gude (/ˈɡʊdiː/; born 1950) is an American artist and educator recognized for community public art mural and mosaic projects, and as the founding director of Spiral Workshops (an art program for teenagers as well as a curriculum research project on art education). Gude was a professor at the University of Illinois at Chicago and was on the visual-arts writing team for the Next Generation National Core Arts Standards. She is now the Angela Gregory Paterakis Professor of Art Education at the School of the Art Institute of Chicago. She is a Senior Artist member of the Chicago Public Art Group and author of the book Urban Art Chicago: A Guide to Community Murals, Mosaics, and Sculptures.

== Biography ==
Raised in a "racially mixed, working class St. Louis neighborhood", Gude received her undergraduate degree from Webster College. After moving to Chicago in the 1970s, she attended the University of Chicago for her master's degree between 1980 and 1982.

== Work ==
Gude has created more than 50 public mosaics and murals, collaborating with various communities and generational groups. As a member of the Chicago Public Art Group, she is considered a "core artist" by Kyle McKenzie. One of her pieces, created in 1992 and entitled Where We Come From ... Where We're Going, reflects tape-recorded statements made passers-by when asked questions by the artist. It is located in Hyde Park, Chicago. Another early mural Gude designed with students and residents of Valmeyer, Illinois, stretched the length of the 54-foot public library and depicted the history of the town. Dedicated in 1993, it was destroyed by a flood 2 months later, but county officials preserved the plaster pieces in the hopes that it would be restored. Along with Jon Pounds, she has co-designed many murals, including the 65-foot-long mural on the side of the Mifflin Street Community Co-op. Other murals Gude has collaborated on include art in Los Angeles and Madison, Wisconsin. One of her murals in Los Angeles celebrated the World Cup and was located near Highland Park. Gude has also collaborated on a mural in Roseland-Pullman, which celebrated Eugene Debs and George Pullman, along with incorporating ethnic patterns into the design. As of 2013, she has "been part of more than 50 significant public and mosaic projects that have involved a cross-section of generations".

Gude's book Urban Art Chicago is a 255-page guide to the public art of Chicago and is considered the first of its kind by the Chicago Tribune. Janet Braun-Reinitz and Jane Weissman, who wrote On the Wall: Four Decades of Community Murals in New York City praised Gude's book in The New York Times. Gude has published many chapters in books and articles covering community art and art education. Gude's writing has appeared in Public Art Review, Art Journal, Art Education: The Journal of the National Art Education Association, and Feminist Studies Journal and in the SUNY Press book Cultural Activisms: Poetic Voices, Political Voices.

Olivia Gude began the program known as the Spiral Workshop. This is a Saturday art program where teens are given the opportunity to make and study contemporary art. Gude launched the Spiral Art Education Website in 2002, where innovative art projects developed through the workshop's programs are published.

== Awards ==
In 1997, she won Best of Show and Best of Series from the National Art Education Association (NAEA). Gude won the 1999 Illinois Governor's Award for Excellence in Downtown Revitalization in 2000 for her 1999 mural in DeKalb, Illinois. She was also honored with the NAEA's Manuel Barkan Award in 2014 for her article "New School Art Styles: The Project of Art Education", which was published in Art Education in 2013. Gude was also awarded the Illinois Art Education Association's Higher Education Art Educator of the Year. Prior to that, in 2009, Gude was honored by the NAEA with the Viktor Lowenfeld Award, in recognition of her art-education contributions.
