= Bilecik Şeyh Edebali University =

Public university in Bilecik, Turkey

Bilecik University
- Established: 2007
- Location: Bilecik, Turkey; 40.1893°N 29.9691°E
- Website: Official website

Bilecik University is a university located in Bilecik, Turkey. It was established in 2007.

Bozüyük Vocational School was part of Anadolu University before 2007. Initially established with faculties of arts and sciences, engineering, and institutes of social sciences and natural sciences, the university later expanded to include the Faculty of Economics and Administrative Sciences, Osmaneli Vocational School, Pazaryeri Vocational School, Gölpazarı Vocational School, Söğüt Vocational School, Health Services Vocational School, and Bozüyük Vocational School.
