= List of populated places in Bursa Province =

Places in Turkey

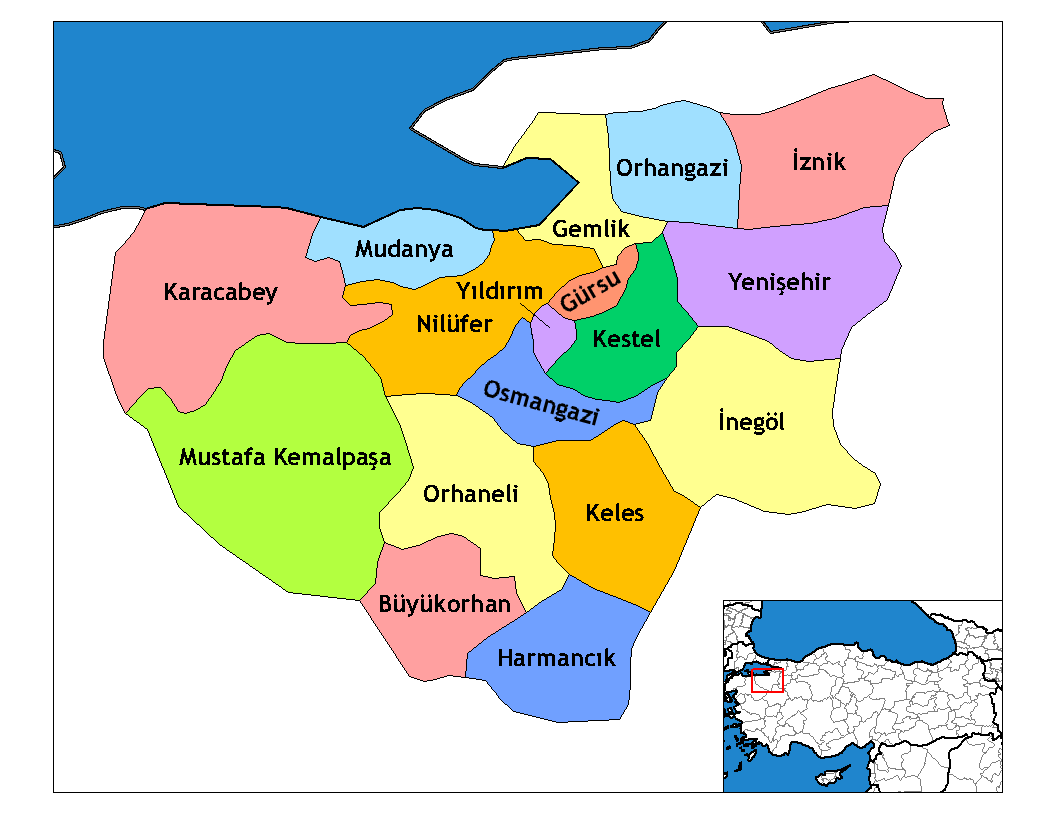
Bursa Province

Below is the list of populated places in Bursa Province, Turkey by the districts. The first seven districts (Gemlik, Gürsu, Kestel, Mudanya, Nilüfer, Osmangazi, Yıldırım) are actually parts of Greater Bursa. The first place in each list is the administrative center of the district.

== Gemlik ==
- Gemlik
- Adliye, Gemlik
- Büyükkumla, Gemlik
- Cihatlı, Gemlik
- Engürücük, Gemlik
- Fevziye, Gemlik
- Fındıcak, Gemlik
- Güvenli, Gemlik
- Hamidiye, Gemlik
- Haydariye, Gemlik
- Karacaali, Gemlik
- Katırlı, Gemlik
- Kurtul, Gemlik
- Muratoba, Gemlik
- Narlı, Gemlik
- Şahinyurdu, Gemlik
- Şükriye, Gemlik
- Umurbey, Gemlik
- Yeniköy, Gemlik

== Gürsu ==
- Gürsu
- Cambazlar, Gürsu
- Dışkaya, Gürsu
- Ericek, Gürsu
- İğdir, Gürsu
- Karahıdır, Gürsu
- Kazıklı, Gürsu

== Kestel ==
- Kestel
- Ağlaşan, Kestel
- Aksu, Kestel
- Alaçam, Kestel
- Babasultan, Kestel
- Burhaniye, Kestel
- Çataltepe, Kestel
- Derekızık, Kestel
- Dudaklı, Kestel
- Erdoğan, Kestel
- Gölbaşı, Kestel
- Gölcük, Kestel
- Gözede, Kestel
- Kayacık, Kestel
- Kozluören, Kestel
- Lütfiye, Kestel
- Narlıdere, Kestel
- Nüzhetiye, Kestel
- Orhaniye, Kestel
- Osmaniye, Kestel
- Saitabat, Kestel
- Sayfiye, Kestel
- Seymen, Kestel
- Soğuksu, Kestel
- Şevketiye, Kestel
- Şükraniye, Kestel
- Turanköy, Kestel
- Ümitalan, Kestel
- Yağmurlu, Kestel

== Mudanya ==
- Mudanya
- Akköy, Mudanya
- Altıntaş, Mudanya
- Aydınpınar, Mudanya
- Balabancık, Mudanya
- Çağrışan, Mudanya
- Çamlık, Mudanya
- Çayönü, Mudanya
- Çekrice, Mudanya
- Çepni, Mudanya
- Çınarlı, Mudanya
- Dede, Mudanya
- Dere, Mudanya
- Eğerce, Mudanya
- Emirleryenicesi, Mudanya
- Esence, Mudanya
- Evciler, Mudanya
- Göynüklü, Mudanya
- Hançerli, Mudanya
- Işıklı, Mudanya
- İpekyayla, Mudanya
- Kaymakoba, Mudanya
- Kumyaka, Mudanya
- Küçükyenice, Mudanya
- Mesudiye, Mudanya
- Mirzaoba, Mudanya
- Mürsel, Mudanya
- Orhaniye, Mudanya
- Söğütpınar, Mudanya
- Yalıçiftlik, Mudanya
- Yaman, Mudanya
- Yaylacık, Mudanya
- Yörükali, Mudanya
- Yürükyenicesi, Mudanya
- Zeytinbağı, Mudanya

== Nilüfer ==
- Nilüfer
- Atlas, Nilüfer
- Ayvaköy, Nilüfer
- Badırga, Nilüfer
- Başköy, Nilüfer
- Büyükbalıklı, Nilüfer
- Çatalağıl, Nilüfer
- Çaylı, Nilüfer
- Dağyenice, Nilüfer
- Doğanköy, Nilüfer
- Fadıllı, Nilüfer
- Güngören, Nilüfer
- İnegazi, Nilüfer
- Kadriye, Nilüfer
- Karacaoba, Nilüfer
- Konaklı, Nilüfer
- Korubaşı, Nilüfer
- Kuruçeşme, Nilüfer
- Makşempınarı, Nilüfer
- Tahtalı, Nilüfer
- Unçukuru, Nilüfer
- Üçpınar, Nilüfer
- Yaylacık, Nilüfer
- Yolçatı, Nilüfer

== Osmangazi ==
- Osmangazi
- Ahmetbey, Osmangazi
- Aksungur, Osmangazi
- Avdancık, Osmangazi
- Bağlı, Osmangazi
- Büyükdeliller, Osmangazi
- Çağlıyan, Osmangazi
- Çaybaşı, Osmangazi
- Dağakçaköy, Osmangazi
- Doğancı, Osmangazi
- Dürdane, Osmangazi
- Gökçeören, Osmangazi
- Güneybayır, Osmangazi
- Güneybudaklar, Osmangazi
- Hüseyinalan, Osmangazi
- Karabalçık, Osmangazi
- Karaislah, Osmangazi
- Küçükdeliller, Osmangazi
- Mürseller, Osmangazi
- Nilüfer, Osmangazi
- Seç, Osmangazi
- Seferışıklar, Osmangazi
- Selçukgazi, Osmangazi
- Soğukpınar, Osmangazi
- Süleymaniye, Osmangazi
- Tuzaklı, Osmangazi
- Uluçam, Osmangazi
- Yiğitali, Osmangazi

== Yıldırım ==
- Yıldırım
- Hamamlıkızık, Yıldırım

== Büyükorhan ==
- Büyükorhan
- Akçasaz, Büyükorhan
- Aktaş, Büyükorhan
- Balaban, Büyükorhan
- Bayındır, Büyükorhan
- Burunca, Büyükorhan
- Çakıryenice, Büyükorhan
- Çeribaşı, Büyükorhan
- Çökene, Büyükorhan
- Danacılar, Büyükorhan
- Danaçalı, Büyükorhan
- Demirler, Büyükorhan
- Derecik, Büyükorhan
- Durhasan, Büyükorhan
- Düğüncüler, Büyükorhan
- Elekçalı, Büyükorhan
- Ericek, Büyükorhan
- Gedikler, Büyükorhan
- Geynik, Büyükorhan
- Hacıahmetler, Büyükorhan
- Hacılar, Büyükorhan
- Hemşeriler, Büyükorhan
- Karaağız, Büyükorhan
- Karaçukur, Büyükorhan
- Karalar, Büyükorhan
- Kayapa, Büyükorhan
- Kınık, Büyükorhan
- Kuşlar, Büyükorhan
- Mazlumlar, Büyükorhan
- Osmanlar, Büyükorhan
- Örencik, Büyükorhan
- Özlüce, Büyükorhan
- Perçin, Büyükorhan
- Pınarköy, Büyükorhan
- Piribeyler, Büyükorhan
- Sarnıç, Büyükorhan
- Tekerler, Büyükorhan
- Veletler, Büyükorhan
- Yenice, Büyükorhan
- Zaferiye, Büyükorhan

== Harmancık ==
- Harmancık
- Akpınar, Harmancık
- Alutca, Harmancık
- Balatdanişment, Harmancık
- Bekdemirler, Harmancık
- Çakmak, Harmancık
- Çatalsöğüt, Harmancık
- Dedebali, Harmancık
- Delicegüney, Harmancık
- Dutluca, Harmancık
- Gedikören, Harmancık
- Gökçeler, Harmancık
- Gülözü, Harmancık
- Harmancık Akalan, Harmancık
- Hopandanişment, Harmancık
- Ilıcaksu, Harmancık
- İshaklar, Harmancık
- Kışmanlar, Harmancık
- Kocapınar, Harmancık
- Kozluca, Harmancık
- Nalbant, Harmancık
- Okçular, Harmancık
- Yeşilyurt, Harmancık

== İnegöl ==
- İnegöl
- Akbaşlar, İnegöl
- Akıncılar, İnegöl
- Alibey, İnegöl
- Aşağıballık, İnegöl
- Babaoğlu, İnegöl
- Bahariye, İnegöl
- Bahçekaya, İnegöl
- Bayramşah, İnegöl
- Bilalköy, İnegöl
- Boğazköy, İnegöl
- Cerrah, İnegöl
- Çavuşköy, İnegöl
- Çaylıca, İnegöl
- Çayyaka, İnegöl
- Çeltikçi, İnegöl
- Çiftlikköy, İnegöl
- Çitli, İnegöl
- Deydinler, İnegöl
- Dipsizgöl, İnegöl
- Doğanyurdu, İnegöl
- Dömez, İnegöl
- Edebey, İnegöl
- Elmaçayır, İnegöl
- Esenköy, İnegöl
- Eskikaracakaya, İnegöl
- Eskiköy, İnegöl
- Eymir, İnegöl
- Fevziye, İnegöl
- Fındıklı, İnegöl
- Gedikpınar, İnegöl
- Gülbahçe, İnegöl
- Gündüzlü, İnegöl
- Güneykestane, İnegöl
- Güzelyurt, İnegöl
- Hacıkara, İnegöl
- Halhalca, İnegöl
- Hamamlı, İnegöl
- Hamidiye, İnegöl
- Hamitabat, İnegöl
- Hamzabey, İnegöl
- Hasanpaşa, İnegöl
- Hayriye, İnegöl
- Hilmiye, İnegöl
- Hocaköy, İnegöl
- İclaliye, İnegöl
- İhsaniye, İnegöl
- İnayet, İnegöl
- İsaören, İnegöl
- İskaniye, İnegöl
- Karagölet, İnegöl
- Karahasanlar, İnegöl
- Karakadı, İnegöl
- Karalar, İnegöl
- Kayapınar, İnegöl
- Kestanealan, İnegöl
- Kınık, İnegöl
- Kıran, İnegöl
- Kocakonak, İnegöl
- Konurlar, İnegöl
- Kozluca, İnegöl
- Kulaca, İnegöl
- Kurşunlu, İnegöl
- Küçükyenice, İnegöl
- Lütfiye, İnegöl
- Madenköy, İnegöl
- Mesruriye, İnegöl
- Mezit, İnegöl
- Muratbey, İnegöl
- Olukman, İnegöl
- Ortaköy, İnegöl
- Osmaniye, İnegöl
- Özlüce, İnegöl
- Paşaören, İnegöl
- Rüştiye, İnegöl
- Saadet, İnegöl
- Sarıpınar, İnegöl
- Soğukdere, İnegöl
- Sulhiye, İnegöl
- Sultaniye, İnegöl
- Sungurpaşa, İnegöl
- Süle, İnegöl
- Sülüklügöl, İnegöl
- Süpürtü, İnegöl
- Şehitler, İnegöl
- Şipali, İnegöl
- Tahtaköprü, İnegöl
- Tekkeköy, İnegöl
- Tokuş, İnegöl
- Turgutalp, İnegöl
- Tüfekçikonak, İnegöl
- Yeniceköy, İnegöl
- Yeniköy, İnegöl
- Yeniyörük, İnegöl
- Yiğit, İnegöl
- Yukarıballık, İnegöl

== İznik ==
- İznik
- Aydınlar, İznik
- Bayındır, İznik
- Boyalıca, İznik
- Candarlı, İznik
- Çakırca, İznik
- Çamdibi, İznik
- Çamoluk, İznik
- Çiçekli, İznik
- Derbent, İznik
- Dereköy, İznik
- Dırazali, İznik
- Elbeyli, İznik
- Elmalı, İznik
- Göllüce, İznik
- Gürmüzlü, İznik
- Hacıosman, İznik
- Hisardere, İznik
- Hocaköy, İznik
- İhsaniye, İznik
- İnikli, İznik
- Karatekin, İznik
- Kaynarca, İznik
- Kırıntı, İznik
- Kutluca, İznik
- Mahmudiye, İznik
- Mecidiye, İznik
- Mustafalı, İznik
- Müşküle, İznik
- Nüzhetiye, İznik
- Orhaniye, İznik
- Osmaniye, İznik
- Ömerli, İznik
- Sansarak, İznik
- Sarıağıl, İznik
- Süleymaniye, İznik
- Şerefiye, İznik
- Tacir, İznik
- Yenişerefiye, İznik
- Yürükler, İznik

== Karacabey ==
- Karacabey
- Akçakoyun, Karacabey
- Akçasusurluk, Karacabey
- Akhisar, Karacabey
- Arız, Karacabey
- Bakır, Karacabey
- Ballıkaya, Karacabey
- Bayramdere, Karacabey
- Beylik, Karacabey
- Boğaz, Karacabey
- Canbaz, Karacabey
- Çamlıca, Karacabey
- Çarık, Karacabey
- Çavuş, Karacabey
- Çeşnigir, Karacabey
- Dağesemen, Karacabey
- Dağkadı, Karacabey
- Danişment, Karacabey
- Doğla, Karacabey
- Ekinli, Karacabey
- Ekmekçi, Karacabey
- Eskikaraağaç, Karacabey
- Eskisarıbey, Karacabey
- Fevzipaşa, Karacabey
- Gölecik, Karacabey
- Gölkıyı, Karacabey
- Gönü, Karacabey
- Güngörmez, Karacabey
- Hamidiye, Karacabey
- Harmanlı, Karacabey
- Hayırlar, Karacabey
- Hotanlı, Karacabey
- Hürriyet, Karacabey
- İkizce, Karacabey
- İnkaya, Karacabey
- İsmetpaşa, Karacabey
- Karakoca, Karacabey
- Karasu, Karacabey
- Kedikaya, Karacabey
- Keşlik, Karacabey
- Kıranlar, Karacabey
- Kulakpınar, Karacabey
- Kurşunlu, Karacabey
- Küçükkaraağaç, Karacabey
- Muratlı, Karacabey
- Okçular, Karacabey
- Orhaniye, Karacabey
- Ortasarıbey, Karacabey
- Ovaesemen, Karacabey
- Örencik, Karacabey
- Sazlıca, Karacabey
- Seyran, Karacabey
- Subaşı, Karacabey
- Sultaniye, Karacabey
- Şahinköy, Karacabey
- Şahmelek, Karacabey
- Taşlık, Karacabey
- Taşpınar, Karacabey
- Tophisar, Karacabey
- Uluabat, Karacabey
- Yarış, Karacabey
- Yenikaraağaç, Karacabey
- Yenisarıbey, Karacabey
- Yeşildere, Karacabey
- Yolağzı, Karacabey

== Keles ==
- Keles
- Akçapınar, Keles
- Alpağut, Keles
- Avdan, Keles
- Baraklı, Keles
- Basak, Keles
- Belenören, Keles
- Bıyıklıalanı, Keles
- Çayören, Keles
- Dağ Demirciler, Keles
- Dağdibi, Keles
- Davutlar, Keles
- Dedeler, Keles
- Delice, Keles
- Denizler, Keles
- Durak, Keles
- Düvenli, Keles
- Epçeler, Keles
- Gelemiç, Keles
- Gököz, Keles
- Harmanalanı, Keles
- Harmancık Demirci, Keles
- Haydar, Keles
- Issızören, Keles
- Karaardıç, Keles
- Kemaliye, Keles
- Kıran Işıklar, Keles
- Koca Kovacık, Keles
- Kozbudaklar, Keles
- Menteşe, Keles
- Pınarcık, Keles
- Sorgun, Keles
- Uzunöz, Keles
- Yağcılar, Keles
- Yazıbaşı, Keles
- Yunuslar, Keles

== Mustafakemalpaşa ==
- Mustafakemalpaşa
- Adaköy, Mustafakemalpaşa
- Ağaçlı, Mustafakemalpaşa
- Akarca, Mustafakemalpaşa
- Akçapınar, Mustafakemalpaşa
- Alacaat, Mustafakemalpaşa
- Aliseydi, Mustafakemalpaşa
- Alpağut, Mustafakemalpaşa
- Aralık, Mustafakemalpaşa
- Aşağıbalı, Mustafakemalpaşa
- Ayaz, Mustafakemalpaşa
- Bahariye, Mustafakemalpaşa
- Behram, Mustafakemalpaşa
- Boğaz, Mustafakemalpaşa
- Bostandere, Mustafakemalpaşa
- Bük, Mustafakemalpaşa
- Camandar, Mustafakemalpaşa
- Çakallar, Mustafakemalpaşa
- Çaltılıbük, Mustafakemalpaşa
- Çamlıca, Mustafakemalpaşa
- Çardakbelen, Mustafakemalpaşa
- Çavuş, Mustafakemalpaşa
- Çeltikçi, Mustafakemalpaşa
- Çiviliçam, Mustafakemalpaşa
- Çömlekçi, Mustafakemalpaşa
- Çördük, Mustafakemalpaşa
- Dallıca, Mustafakemalpaşa
- Demirdere, Mustafakemalpaşa
- Demireli, Mustafakemalpaşa
- Derecik, Mustafakemalpaşa
- Derekadı, Mustafakemalpaşa
- Devecikonağı, Mustafakemalpaşa
- Doğanalan, Mustafakemalpaşa
- Doğancı, Mustafakemalpaşa
- Dorak, Mustafakemalpaşa
- Döllük, Mustafakemalpaşa
- Durumtay, Mustafakemalpaşa
- Eskibalçık, Mustafakemalpaşa
- Eskikızılelma, Mustafakemalpaşa
- Fındıcak, Mustafakemalpaşa
- Garipçetekke, Mustafakemalpaşa
- Güller, Mustafakemalpaşa
- Güllüce, Mustafakemalpaşa
- Gündoğdu, Mustafakemalpaşa
- Güveçdere, Mustafakemalpaşa
- Güvem, Mustafakemalpaşa
- Hacıahmet, Mustafakemalpaşa
- Hacıali, Mustafakemalpaşa
- Hamidiye, Mustafakemalpaşa
- Hisaraltı, Mustafakemalpaşa
- Işıklar, Mustafakemalpaşa
- İlyasçılar, Mustafakemalpaşa
- İncealipınar, Mustafakemalpaşa
- İncilipınar, Mustafakemalpaşa
- Kabulbaba, Mustafakemalpaşa
- Kadirçeşme, Mustafakemalpaşa
- Kapaklıoluk, Mustafakemalpaşa
- Karacalar, Mustafakemalpaşa
- Karaköy, Mustafakemalpaşa
- Karaoğlan, Mustafakemalpaşa
- Karaorman, Mustafakemalpaşa
- Karapınar, Mustafakemalpaşa
- Kayabaşı, Mustafakemalpaşa
- Kazanpınar, Mustafakemalpaşa
- Keltaş, Mustafakemalpaşa
- Kestelek, Mustafakemalpaşa
- Killik, Mustafakemalpaşa
- Kocakoru, Mustafakemalpaşa
- Kosova, Mustafakemalpaşa
- Koşuboğazı, Mustafakemalpaşa
- Kömürcükadı, Mustafakemalpaşa
- Körekem, Mustafakemalpaşa
- Kösehoroz, Mustafakemalpaşa
- Kumkadı, Mustafakemalpaşa
- Kurşunlu, Mustafakemalpaşa
- Lütfiye, Mustafakemalpaşa
- Melik, Mustafakemalpaşa
- Muradiyesarnıç, Mustafakemalpaşa
- Ocaklı, Mustafakemalpaşa
- Onaç, Mustafakemalpaşa
- Orhaniye, Mustafakemalpaşa
- Ormankadı, Mustafakemalpaşa
- Osmaniye, Mustafakemalpaşa
- Ovaazatlı, Mustafakemalpaşa
- Ömeraltı, Mustafakemalpaşa
- Paşalar, Mustafakemalpaşa
- Sarımustafalar, Mustafakemalpaşa
- Sincansarnıç, Mustafakemalpaşa
- Soğucak, Mustafakemalpaşa
- Soğukpınar, Mustafakemalpaşa
- Söğütalan, Mustafakemalpaşa
- Sünlük, Mustafakemalpaşa
- Şapçı, Mustafakemalpaşa
- Şehriman, Mustafakemalpaşa
- Taşköprü, Mustafakemalpaşa
- Taşpınar, Mustafakemalpaşa
- Tatkavaklı, Mustafakemalpaşa
- Tepecik, Mustafakemalpaşa
- Tırnova, Mustafakemalpaşa
- Uğurlupınar, Mustafakemalpaşa
- Üçbeyli, Mustafakemalpaşa
- Yalıntaş, Mustafakemalpaşa
- Yamanlı, Mustafakemalpaşa
- Yaylaçayır, Mustafakemalpaşa
- Yenibalçık, Mustafakemalpaşa
- Yenice, Mustafakemalpaşa
- Yenikızılelma, Mustafakemalpaşa
- Yeşilova, Mustafakemalpaşa
- Yoncaağaç, Mustafakemalpaşa
- Yukarıbalı, Mustafakemalpaşa
- Yumurcaklı, Mustafakemalpaşa

== Orhaneli ==
- Orhaneli
- Ağaçhisar, Orhaneli
- Akalan, Orhaneli
- Akçabük, Orhaneli
- Altıntaş, Orhaneli
- Argın, Orhaneli
- Balıoğlu, Orhaneli
- Başköy, Orhaneli
- Belenoluk, Orhaneli
- Celepler, Orhaneli
- Çeki, Orhaneli
- Çınarcık, Orhaneli
- Çivili, Orhaneli
- Çöreler, Orhaneli
- Dağgüney, Orhaneli
- Deliballılar, Orhaneli
- Demirci, Orhaneli
- Dere, Orhaneli
- Dündar, Orhaneli
- Emir, Orhaneli
- Erenler, Orhaneli
- Eskidanişment, Orhaneli
- Fadıl, Orhaneli
- Firoz, Orhaneli
- Gazioluk, Orhaneli
- Girencik, Orhaneli
- Göktepe, Orhaneli
- Göynükbelen, Orhaneli
- Gümüşpınar, Orhaneli
- İkizoluk, Orhaneli
- Kabaklar, Orhaneli
- Kadı, Orhaneli
- Karaoğlanlar, Orhaneli
- Karasi, Orhaneli
- Karıncalı, Orhaneli
- Koçu, Orhaneli
- Kusumlar, Orhaneli
- Küçükorhan, Orhaneli
- Letafet, Orhaneli
- Mahaller, Orhaneli
- Nalınlar, Orhaneli
- Orta, Orhaneli
- Osmaniyeçatak, Orhaneli
- Sadağı, Orhaneli
- Semerci, Orhaneli
- Serçeler, Orhaneli
- Sırıl, Orhaneli
- Söğüt, Orhaneli
- Süleymanbey, Orhaneli
- Şükriye, Orhaneli
- Tepecik, Orhaneli
- Topuk, Orhaneli
- Yakuplar, Orhaneli
- Yenidanişment, Orhaneli
- Yeşiller, Orhaneli
- Yörücekler, Orhaneli

== Orhangazi ==
- Orhangazi
- Akharem, Orhangazi
- Bayırköy, Orhangazi
- Cihanköy, Orhangazi
- Çakırlı, Orhangazi
- Çeltikçi, Orhangazi
- Dutluca, Orhangazi
- Fındıklı, Orhangazi
- Gedelek, Orhangazi
- Gemiç, Orhangazi
- Gölyaka, Orhangazi
- Gürle, Orhangazi
- Hamzalı, Orhangazi
- Heceler, Orhangazi
- Karsak, Orhangazi
- Keramet, Orhangazi
- Mahmudiye, Orhangazi
- Narlıca, Orhangazi
- Ortaköy, Orhangazi
- Örnekköy, Orhangazi
- Paşapınar, Orhangazi
- Sölöz, Orhangazi
- Üreğil, Orhangazi
- Yenigürle, Orhangazi
- Yeniköy, Orhangazi
- Yenisölöz, Orhangazi

== Yenişehir ==
- Yenişehir
- Afşar, Yenişehir
- Akbıyık, Yenişehir
- Akçapınar, Yenişehir
- Akdere, Yenişehir
- Alaylı, Yenişehir
- Ayaz, Yenişehir
- Aydoğdu, Yenişehir
- Barcın, Yenişehir
- Beypınar, Yenişehir
- Burcun, Yenişehir
- Cihadiye, Yenişehir
- Çamönü, Yenişehir
- Çardak, Yenişehir
- Çayırlı, Yenişehir
- Çelebi, Yenişehir
- Çeltikçi, Yenişehir
- Çiçeközü, Yenişehir
- Demirboğa, Yenişehir
- Dere, Yenişehir
- Ebe, Yenişehir
- Eyerce, Yenişehir
- Fethiye, Yenişehir
- Gökçesu, Yenişehir
- Günece, Yenişehir
- Hayriye, Yenişehir
- İncirli, Yenişehir
- Kara, Yenişehir
- Karaamca, Yenişehir
- Karabahadır, Yenişehir
- Karacaahmet, Yenişehir
- Karacaali, Yenişehir
- Karasıl, Yenişehir
- Kavaklı, Yenişehir
- Kıblepınar, Yenişehir
- Kızıl, Yenişehir
- Kızılhisar, Yenişehir
- Kirazlıyayla, Yenişehir
- Koyunhisar, Yenişehir
- Kozdere, Yenişehir
- Köprühisar, Yenişehir
- Mahmudiye, Yenişehir
- Marmaracık, Yenişehir
- Mecidiye, Yenişehir
- Menteşe, Yenişehir
- Orhaniye, Yenişehir
- Osmaniye, Yenişehir
- Papatya, Yenişehir
- Paşayayla, Yenişehir
- Reşadiye, Yenişehir
- Selimiye, Yenişehir
- Söylemiş, Yenişehir
- Subaşı, Yenişehir
- Süleymaniye, Yenişehir
- Terziler, Yenişehir
- Toprakdere, Yenişehir
- Toprakocak, Yenişehir
- Yarhisar, Yenişehir
- Yazılı, Yenişehir
- Yeni, Yenişehir
- Yıldırım, Yenişehir
- Yolören, Yenişehir

== Recent development ==
According to Law act no 6360, all Turkish provinces with a population more than 750 000, were renamed as metropolitan municipality. All districts in those provinces became second level municipalities and all villages in those districts were renamed as a neighborhoods . Thus the villages listed above are officially neighborhoods of Bursa.
