= Osmaniye (disambiguation) =

Osmaniye can refer to:

- Osmaniye
- Osmaniye, Alpu
- Osmaniye, Bayramiç
- Osmaniye, Biga
- Osmaniye, Çorum
- Osmaniye, İznik
- Osmaniye, Kestel
- Osmaniye, Mustafakemalpaşa
- Osmaniye, Orhaneli

== See also ==
- Osmaniye Mosque
