= Ariz =

Ariz may refer to:

== Places ==
=== Lebanon ===
- Ariz, Bsharri District, Lebanon

=== Portugal ===
- Ariz, a parish in Marco de Canaveses, Porto, Portugal
- Ariz, a parish in Moimenta da Beira, Viseu, Portugal

=== Spain ===
- Ariz (Basauri), Biscay, Basque Country, Spain, a neighborhood
  - Ariz (Bilbao Metro), a metro station serving Ariz

=== Turkey ===
- Arız, Karacabey, a village in the Bursa Province, Turkey,
- Arız, Kastamonu, a village in the Kastamonu Province, Turkey,

=== United States ===
- Ariz., an abbreviated form of Arizona

== Other uses ==
- ARIZ, Russian acronym of алгоритм решения изобретательских задач (АРИЗ) (algorithm of inventive problems solving)

== See also ==
- Aris (disambiguation)
