= Garipçe =

Garipçe may refer to:

- Garipçe, Güdül, a village in the Güdül district of Ankara Province, Turkey
- Garipçe, Karacabey a village in the Karacabey district of Bursa Province, Turkey
- Garipçe, Korkuteli, a village in the Korkuteli district of Antalya Province, Turkey
- Garipçe, Sarıyer, a village in the Sarıyer district of Istanbul Province, Turkey
- Garipçe, Sinanpaşa, a village in the Sinanpaşa district of Afyonkarahisar Province, Turkey
