= Güvem =

Güvem can refer to the following villages in Turkey:

- Güvem, Kızılcahamam
- Güvem, Mustafakemalpaşa
- Güvem, Savaştepe
