= Arız =

Arız can refer to:

- Arız, Karacabey
- Arız, Kastamonu
