= Devecikonağı Dam =

- Location within Turkey
- Official name: Devecikonağı Baraji ve HES
- Country: Turkey
- Location: Devecikonağı, Mustafakemalpaşa, Bursa Province
- Coordinates: 39°52′31.86″N 28°34′27.90″E
- Purpose: Power
- Status: Operational
- Construction began: 2010
- Opening date: 2012; 14 years ago

Dam and spillways
- Type of dam: Gravity, roller-compacted concrete
- Impounds: Emet Stream
- Height: 40 m (130 ft)
- Length: 298 m (978 ft)
- Spillway type: Overflow, five tainter gates
- Spillway capacity: 2,545 m^{3}/s (89,900 cu ft/s)

Reservoir
- Total capacity: 6,200,000 m^{3} (5,000 acre⋅ft)
- Active capacity: 1,900,000 m^{3} (1,500 acre⋅ft)
- Surface area: 660 m^{2} (0.16 acres)

Power Station
- Commission date: 2012
- Turbines: 3 x Kaplan-type
- Installed capacity: 29 MW

The Devecikonağı Dam is a gravity dam on Emet Stream about 5 km (3.1 mi) south of Devecikonağı in Bursa Province, Turkey. The primary purpose of the dam is to generate hydroelectric power and it has a 29 MW power station. Construction on the 40 m (130 ft) tall dam began in September 2010 and its power station was operational in 2012. To regulate water flow into the dam's reservoir and produce power more consistently, Kizkayasi Dam is planned upstream.

== See also ==
- List of dams and reservoirs in Turkey
