= Dündarköy =

Dündarköy can refer to:

- Dündarköy, Karayazı
- Dündarköy, Orhaneli
