= Yeşiller =

Yeşiller can refe to:

- Yeşiller, Orhaneli
- Green Party (Turkey)
