= Çınarcık (disambiguation) =

Çınarcık can refer to:

- Çınarcık
- Çınarcık, Orhaneli
- Çınarcık, Yenice
