= Gonu (disambiguation) =

Gonu may refer to:

- Gonu game.
- Cyclone Gonu
- Gonu, Iran
- Government of National Unity
- Gönü, Karacabey
