= İnkaya (disambiguation) =

İnkaya can refer to:

- İnkaya
- İnkaya Cave
- İnkaya, Karacabey
- İnkaya, Kulp
