= Hudavendigar =

Hudavendigar may refer to:

- Sultan Murad I
- Hüdavendigâr Eyalet
- Hüdavendigar, Karacabey, a village in the Karacabey district of Bursa Province
- Hüdavendigâr Vilayet, successor entity of the above
- the poetic name of Bursa, a Turkish city
