= Mecidiye =

Mecidiye or Médjidié may refer to:

- Mecidiye, Bozkurt
- Mecidiye, Ezine
- Mecidiye, Erzincan
- Mecidiye, Karacabey, a village
- Mecidiye, Keşan, a village
- Mecidiye, Lapseki
- Mecidiye, Savaştepe, a village
- Order of the Medjidie
- Ottoman cruiser Mecidiye

== See also ==
- Mecidiye Kışlası
- Mecidiye Marşı
