= Ortaköy (disambiguation) =

Ortaköy is a neighbourhood in Istanbul.

Ortaköy may also refer to:

== Places ==
- The former Ottoman name of Ivaylovgrad, a town in Haskovo Province, Bulgaria
- Ortaköy, Nicosia, Cyprus

=== Turkey ===
- Ortaköy, Aksaray
- Ortaköy, Amasya
- Ortaköy, Artvin
- Ortaköy, Çal
- Ortaköy, Çorum
- Ortaköy, Feke, village in Adana Province
- Ortaköy, Hınıs
- Ortaköy, İnegöl
- Ortaköy, İspir
- Ortaköy, Kale
- Ortaköy, Mardin
- Ortaköy, Mudurnu
- Ortaköy, Sungurlu
- Ortaköy, Orhaneli
- Ortaköy, Taşköprü
- Ortaköy, Tercan
- Ortaköy, Tufanbeyli, village in Adana Province
- Ortaköy, Uludere, a village in Şırnak province

== Other uses ==
- Ortaköy Mosque, a mosque in Ortaköy, Istanbul
- Ortaköy Spor Kulübü, a football club in Ortaköy, Istanbul
