= Sapci =

Sapci may refer to:

- Şapçı, a village in Greece
- Sapci, Croatia, a village near Garčin, Croatia
- Şapcı, Mustafakemalpaşa
