= Kadıköy (disambiguation) =

Kadıköy is a district in Istanbul, Turkey.

Kadıköy (literally "judge's village") may also refer to other places and things in Turkey:

== Places ==
- Kadıköy, Aydın, a village in Aydın district of Aydın Province
- Kadıköy, Balya, a village
- Kadıköy, Baskil
- Kadıköy, Bigadiç, a village
- Kadıköy, Buldan
- Kadıköy, Çay, a village in Çay district of Afyonkarahisar Province
- Kadıköy, Çerkeş
- Kadıköy, Keşan
- Kadıköy, Mut, a village in Mut district of Mersin Province
- Kadıköy, Nallıhan, a village in Nallıhan district of Ankara Province
- Kadıköy, Orhaneli
- Kadıköy, Refahiye
- Kadıköy, Taşköprü, a village
- Kadıköy, Ulus, a village in Ulus district of Bartın Province
- Kadıköy, Yalova, a town in Yalova Province
- Kadıköy, Yüreğir, a village in Yüreğir district of Adana Province

== Other uses ==
- Kadıköy (Istanbul Metro), a railway station on the M4 line
- Kadıköy Anadolu Lisesi, a high school in Kadıköy district of Istanbul
- Kadıköy Dam, a dam in Edirne Province
- Kadıköy Haldun Taner Stage, a theatre venue located in Kadıköy district of Istanbul
- Kadıköy İnciburnu Feneri, a lighthouse off Kadıköy, Istanbul
- Kadıköy Rugby, a Turkish rugby team

== See also ==
- Kadikoi, a village on the Crimean peninsula, Ukraine
