= Dereköy =

Dereköy (literally "creekville") is a Turkish place name and may refer to the following places in Turkey:

- Dereköy, Akçakoca
- Dereköy, Alanya
- Dereköy, Aşkale
- Dereköy, Aydın
- Dereköy, Balya
- Dereköy, Bayramören
- Dereköy, Biga
- Dereköy, Bozyazı
- Dereköy, Çorum
- Dereköy, Damal
- Dereköy, Dursunbey
- Dereköy, Elmalı
- Dereköy, Emirdağ
- Dereköy, Germencik
- Dereköy, Gökçeada
- Dereköy, Gönen
- Dereköy, Gümüşova
- Dereköy, Haymana
- Dereköy, İznik
- Dereköy, Karamanlı
- Dereköy, Karacasu
- Dereköy, Kargı
- Dereköy, Kaş
- Dereköy, Kemah
- Dereköy, Koçarlı
- Dereköy, Korkuteli
- Dereköy, Kumluca
- Dereköy, Kuyucak
- Dereköy, Kırklareli
- Dereköy, Lapseki
- Dereköy, Manyas
- Dereköy, Mengen
- Dereköy, Mudanya
- Dereköy, Mudurnu
- Dereköy, Mut
- Dereköy, Nallıhan
- Dereköy, Orhaneli
- Dereköy, Pazaryeri
- Dereköy, Sason
- Dereköy, Suluova
- Dereköy, Taşova
- Dereköy, Yeniçağa
- Dereköy, Yenipazar, Aydın
- Dereköy, Yenipazar, Bilecik
- Dereköy, Yenişehir
- Dereköy, Yeşilova
