= Cambaz =

Cambaz can refer to:

- Cambaz (song), a song by Mor ve Ötesi
- Cambaz, Karacabey
- Cambaz, Kastamonu
- Cambaz, Yenice
