= Emirsultan, Karacabey =

Village in Turkey

Emirsultan
- Neighbourhood
- Location in Turkey Emirsultan (Marmara)
- Coordinates: 40.212°N 28.370°E
- Country: Turkey
- Province: Bursa
- District: Karacabey
- Population (2022): 7,980
- Time zone: UTC+3 (TRT)

Emirsultan is a neighbourhood in the municipality and district of Karacabey, Bursa Province in Turkey. Its population is 7,980 (2022).
