= Bakırköy, Karacabey =

Village in Turkey

Bakırköy
- Neighbourhood
- Location in Turkey Bakırköy (Marmara)
- Coordinates: 40.1687°N 28.3950°E
- Country: Turkey
- Province: Bursa
- District: Karacabey
- Population (2022): 498
- Time zone: UTC+3 (TRT)

Bakırköy is a neighbourhood in the municipality and district of Karacabey, Bursa Province in Turkey. Its population is 498 (2022).
