= Gazi, Karacabey =

Village in Turkey

Gazi
- Neighbourhood
- Location in Turkey Gazi (Marmara)
- Coordinates: 40.209°N 28.362°E
- Country: Turkey
- Province: Bursa
- District: Karacabey
- Population (2022): 11,783
- Time zone: UTC+3 (TRT)

Gazi is a neighbourhood in the municipality and district of Karacabey, Bursa Province in Turkey. Its population is 11,783 (2022).
