= Ova Hamidiye, Karacabey =

Village in Turkey

Ova Hamidiye
- Neighbourhood
- Location in Turkey Ova Hamidiye (Marmara)
- Coordinates: 40.122°N 28.193°E
- Country: Turkey
- Province: Bursa
- District: Karacabey
- Population (2022): 313
- Time zone: UTC+3 (TRT)

Ova Hamidiye is a neighbourhood in the municipality and district of Karacabey, Bursa Province in Turkey. Its population is 313 (2022).
