= Mamuriyet, Karacabey =

Village in Turkey

Mamuriyet
- Neighbourhood
- Location in Turkey Mamuriyet (Marmara)
- Coordinates: 40°13′37″N 28°22′1″E
- Country: Turkey
- Province: Bursa
- District: Karacabey
- Population (2022): 569
- Time zone: UTC+3 (TRT)

Mamuriyet is a neighbourhood in the municipality and district of Karacabey, Bursa Province in Turkey. Its population is 569 (2022).
