= Behramköy, Mustafakemalpaşa =

Village in Turkey

Behramköy
- Neighbourhood
- Location in Turkey Behramköy (Marmara)
- Coordinates: 40°00′N 28°26′E
- Country: Turkey
- Province: Bursa
- District: Mustafakemalpaşa
- Population (2022): 212
- Time zone: UTC+3 (TRT)

Behramköy is a neighbourhood in the municipality and district of Mustafakemalpaşa, Bursa Province in Turkey. Its population is 212 (2022).
