= Boğazköy, Karacabey =

Area of Karacabey in Bursa, Turkey

Boğazköy
- Neighbourhood
- Location in Turkey Boğazköy (Marmara)
- Coordinates: 40°21′47″N 28°26′46″E
- Country: Turkey
- Province: Bursa
- District: Karacabey
- Population (2022): 356
- Time zone: UTC+3 (TRT)

Boğazköy is a neighbourhood in the municipality and district of Karacabey in Bursa Province, Turkey. Its population is 356 (2022).
