= İlyasçılar, Mustafakemalpaşa =

Village in Turkey

İlyasçılar
- Neighbourhood
- Country: Turkey
- Province: Bursa
- District: Mustafakemalpaşa
- Population (2022): 166
- Time zone: UTC+3 (TRT)

İlyasçılar is a neighbourhood in the municipality and district of Mustafakemalpaşa, Bursa Province in Turkey. Its population is 166 (2022). This settlement lies about 240 meters above sea level and is surrounded by several other localities, including Aralık and Üçbeyli, which are located approximately 3.5 km to the northwest. The neighborhood is part of the larger administrative structure of Mustafakemalpaşa.
