= Canbalı, Karacabey =

Village in Turkey

Canbalı
- Neighbourhood
- Location in Turkey Canbalı (Marmara)
- Coordinates: 40°12′18″N 28°21′14″E
- Country: Turkey
- Province: Bursa
- District: Karacabey
- Population (2022): 1,840
- Time zone: UTC+3 (TRT)

Canbalı is a neighbourhood in the municipality and district of Karacabey, Bursa Province in Turkey. Its population is 1,840 (2022).
