= Fadılköy, Orhaneli =

Village in Turkey

Fadılköy
- Neighbourhood
- Location in Turkey Fadılköy (Marmara)
- Coordinates: 39°49′N 29°07′E
- Country: Turkey
- Province: Bursa
- District: Orhaneli
- Population (2022): 346
- Time zone: UTC+3 (TRT)

Fadılköy is a neighbourhood in the municipality and district of Orhaneli, Bursa Province in Turkey. Its population is 346 (2022).
