= Drama, Karacabey =

Village in Turkey

Drama
- Neighbourhood
- Location in Turkey Drama (Marmara)
- Coordinates: 40.215°N 28.360°E
- Country: Turkey
- Province: Bursa
- District: Karacabey
- Population (2022): 1,793
- Time zone: UTC+3 (TRT)

Drama is a neighbourhood in the municipality and district of Karacabey, Bursa Province in Turkey. Its population is 1,793 (2022).
