= Boğazköy, Mustafakemalpaşa =

Village in Turkey

Boğazköy
- Neighbourhood
- Location in Turkey Boğazköy (Marmara)
- Coordinates: 40.0231°N 28.2817°E
- Country: Turkey
- Province: Bursa
- District: Mustafakemalpaşa
- Population (2022): 79
- Time zone: UTC+3 (TRT)

Boğazköy is a neighbourhood in the municipality and district of Mustafakemalpaşa, Bursa Province in Turkey. Its population is 79 (2022).
