= Klepetan and Malena =

Croatian storks

- 2001–2021
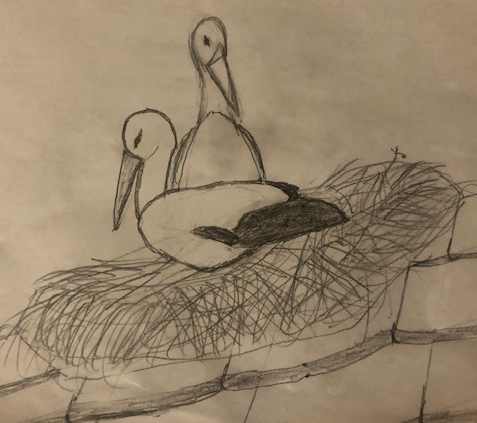
- A sketch of Klepetan and Malena

Klepetan and Malena were a pair of white storks (Ciconia ciconia) who became renowned in Croatia for their romantic endeavors. Between 2001 and 2021, Klepetan traveled from South Africa to Brodski Varoš, Croatia, each spring to mate with Malena, who was unable to travel due to a gunshot injury. On 7 July 2021, Malena died due to old age and natural causes, leaving only Klepetan alive.

== Story ==
Croatia is a popular nesting spot for white storks; some 1,500 nesting pairs reside in the country, with some villages having more storks than people. Croatian janitor Stjepan Vokić found Malena while fishing in 1993; she had been shot by hunters and was unable to fly. Vokić rescued Malena and became her caretaker. In 2001, a male stork, whom Vokić named Klepetan, began to visit Malena. Klepetan returned every spring to mate with Malena. Through a radio tracking band, it was determined that Klepetan made a 13,000-kilometre (8,000 mi) month-long journey from South Africa to Croatia to meet up with Malena each year. Vokić took care of their chicks since Malena was not able to hunt, building them a nest, shelter, and feeding them. In 2017, Klepetan returned to find another bird and a newly laid egg in Malena's nest. Klepetan drove the male away and smashed his competitor's egg. The pair had 66 chicks in total.

In March 2019, a bird that may have been Klepetan showed up unusually early to Brodski Varoš. He left in April and did not return for the rest of the summer. Though reports said that Klepetan had died in August 2019, it turned out to be a different stork. Klepetan returned to Malena once again in April 2020 despite rumors of his death. Klepetan returned for the last time in April 2021.

=== Death of Malena ===
On 7 July 2021, Malena died of old age. Her death was announced by Stjepan Vokić. At the time of her death, she had been cared for by Vokić for 28 years. She was accompanied by Klepetan at the time of her death. Vokić said he hoped Klepetan would come back to his house in 2022 despite the death of his companion.

As of 2024, Klepetan, who is expected to be 35 years old, is still alive and has another mate, Mlada, from whom he had other offspring. Even after her death, Klepetan always visits Malena's grave under Vokić's apple tree when he is around, which is unusual for storks.

== In society ==
A 2017 documentary focused on the storks and Vokić. The Croatian tourism board created an animated video of Klepetan and Malena to promote Croatia. The pair of storks was the subject of a video that led to Lebanon adopting protections for migratory birds. The pair have been described as "Croatia's most unusual love story".

== See also ==
- Yaren (stork)
- List of individual birds
