= Abdullahpaşa, Karacabey =

Village in Turkey

Abdullahpaşa
- Neighbourhood
- Location in Turkey Abdullahpaşa (Marmara)
- Coordinates: 40°13′07″N 28°21′41″E
- Country: Turkey
- Province: Bursa
- District: Karacabey
- Population (2022): 1,151
- Time zone: UTC+3 (TRT)

Abdullahpaşa is a neighbourhood in the municipality and district of Karacabey, Bursa Province in Turkey. Its population is 1,151 (2022).
