= Bükköy, Mustafakemalpaşa =

Village in Turkey

Bükköy
- Neighbourhood
- Location in Turkey Bükköy (Marmara)
- Coordinates: 39.8957°N 28.5769°E
- Country: Turkey
- Province: Bursa
- District: Mustafakemalpaşa
- Population (2022): 215
- Time zone: UTC+3 (TRT)

Bükköy is a neighbourhood in the municipality and district of Mustafakemalpaşa, Bursa Province in Turkey. Its population is 215 (2022).
