= Yaren (stork) =

Stork that befriended people in Turkey

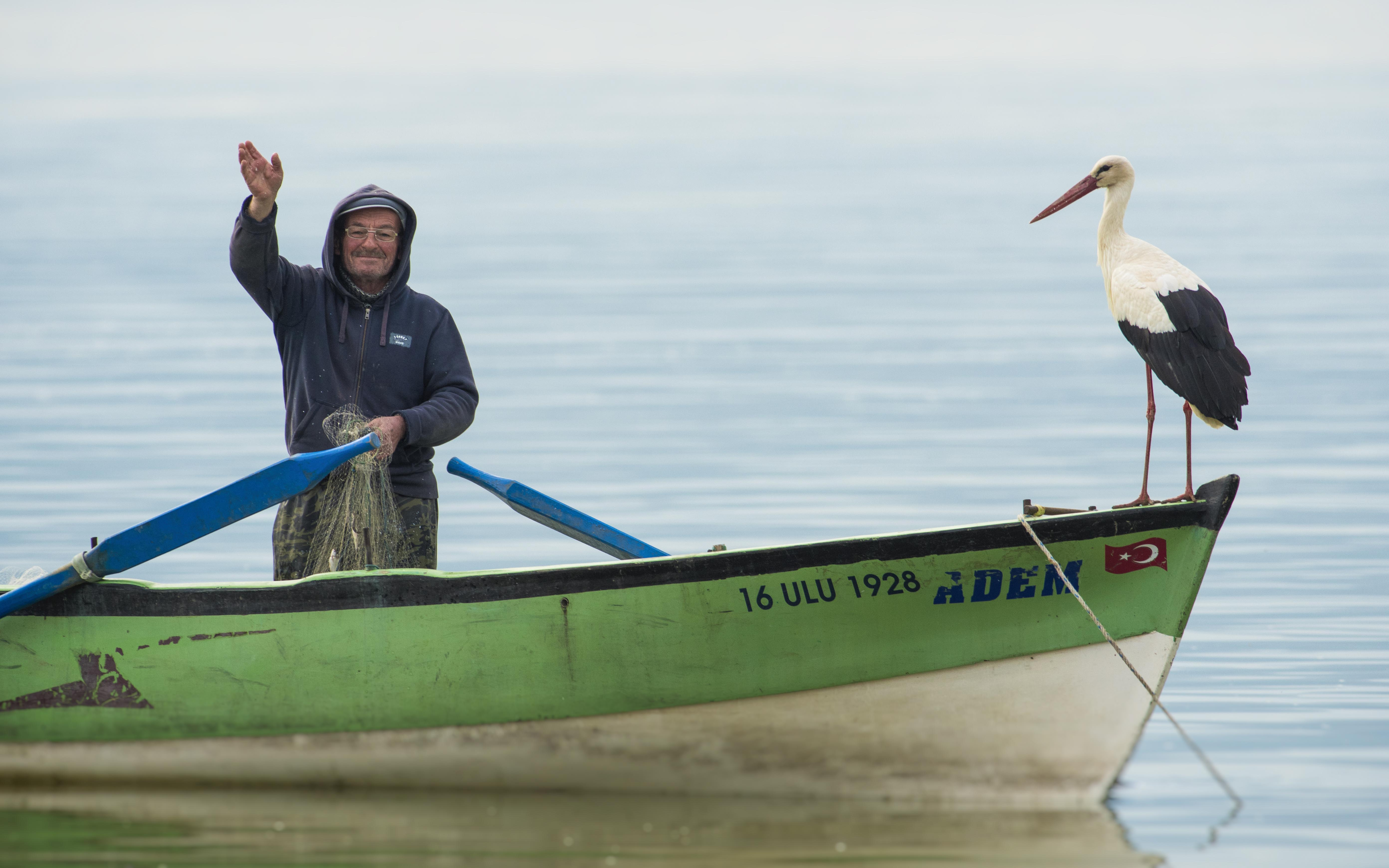
- Yaren on the boat of Adem Yılmaz, 2020
- Species: white stork Ciconia ciconia
- Hatched: c. 2007
- Known for: Unlikely friendship with a fisherman
- http://www.yarenleylek.com

Yaren is a white stork known for his friendship with a fisherman, Adem Yılmaz, living in Eskikaraağaç village of Bursa, Turkey.

Since 2010, the bird leaves Africa each year during his annual migration, flies back in March to the same fisherman in the village on the shore of Uluabat Lake. Yaren, during the sixth months spent in Eskikaraağaç, a member of European Stork Villages Network, lands on the small boat of Adem Yılmaz every morning; they go fishing together.

The extraordinary friendship with a human and a stork was first photographed by local photographer Alper Tüydeş in 2016. Since then, Tüydeş tracks the duo and their reunion every year has been followed by bird watchers and social media users. This unusual friendship was filmed as a documentary by Burak Doğansoysal in 2019. The film selected as the winner for "Best Feature Documentary" at the 2020 Prague Film Awards.

A statue of Yaren and the fisherman was erected at the central square of the village. The walls of houses in Eskikaraağaç are adorned with murals and large photos of Yaren. In 2022, the municipality, in order to promote the publicity of the small village, installed a video camera next to Yaren's nest in the village for broadcasting a livestream from the spot.

Since his ninth arrival in 2020, Yaren has been bringing his partner to the boat. In March 2021, Yaren and his partner visited again; and in June 2021, a live broadcast showed Yaren protecting his chicks from the rain.

== See also ==
- Klepetan and Malena
- List of individual birds
