= Karacaahmet, Karacabey =

Village in Turkey

Karacaahmet
- Neighbourhood
- Location in Turkey Karacaahmet (Marmara)
- Coordinates: 40.210°N 28.356°E
- Country: Turkey
- Province: Bursa
- District: Karacabey
- Population (2022): 2,458
- Time zone: UTC+3 (TRT)

Karacaahmet is a neighbourhood in the municipality and district of Karacabey, Bursa Province in Turkey. Its population is 2,458 (2022).
