= Nasrettin, Karacabey =

Village in Turkey

Nasrettin
- Neighbourhood
- Location in Turkey Nasrettin (Marmara)
- Coordinates: 40.2091°N 28.3539°E
- Country: Turkey
- Province: Bursa
- District: Karacabey
- Population (2022): 1,458
- Time zone: UTC+3 (TRT)

Nasrettin is a neighbourhood in the Karacabey district, Bursa Province, Turkey. Its population is 1,458 (2022).
