= Runguşpaşa, Karacabey =

Village in Turkey

Runguşpaşa
- Neighbourhood
- Location in Turkey Runguşpaşa (Marmara)
- Coordinates: 40.216°N 28.361°E
- Country: Turkey
- Province: Bursa
- District: Karacabey
- Population (2022): 2,272
- Time zone: UTC+3 (TRT)

Runguşpaşa is a neighbourhood in the municipality and district of Karacabey, Bursa Province in Turkey. Its population is 2,272 (2022).
