= Esentepe, Karacabey =

Village in Turkey

Esentepe
- Neighbourhood
- Location in Turkey Esentepe (Marmara)
- Coordinates: 40.218°N 28.372°E
- Country: Turkey
- Province: Bursa
- District: Karacabey
- Population (2022): 3,932
- Time zone: UTC+3 (TRT)

Esentepe is a neighbourhood in the municipality and district of Karacabey, Bursa Province in Turkey. Its population is 3,932 (2022).
