= Karacabey =

- District and municipality
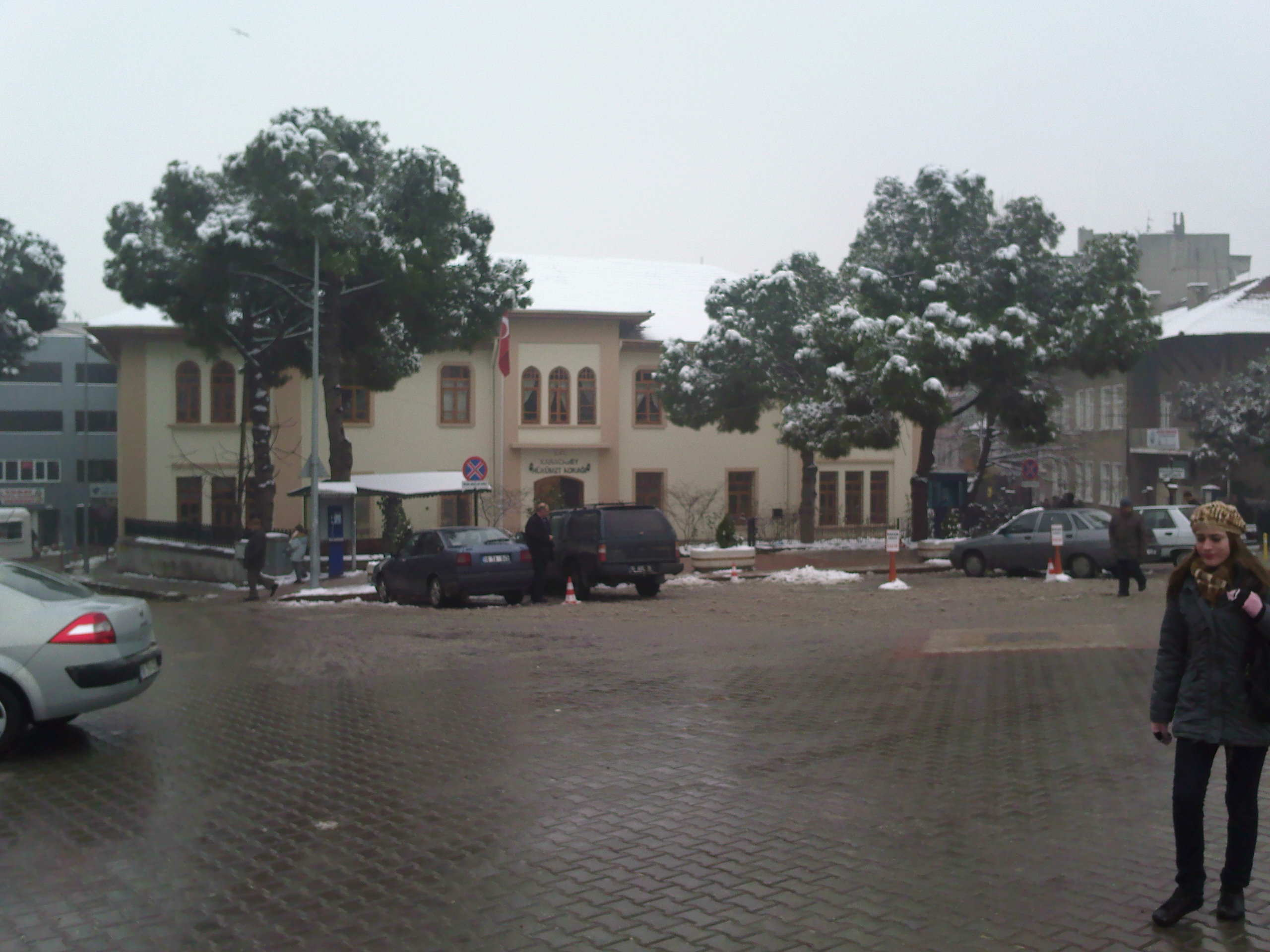

- Map showing Karacabey District in Bursa Province

- Location within Turkey Location within Marmara
- Coordinates: 40°13′N 28°21′E
- Country: Turkey
- Province: Bursa

Government
  - Mayor: Fatih Karabati (AK Party)
- Area: 1,158 km^{2} (447 sq mi)
- Population (2022): 84,907
  - Density: 73.32/km^{2} (189.9/sq mi)
- Time zone: UTC+3 (TRT)
- Postal code: 16700
- Area code: 0224
- Website: www.karacabey.bel.tr

Karacabey is a municipality and district of Bursa Province, Turkey. Its area is 1,158 km^{2}, and its population is 84,907 (2022). It is located just west of the Simav River near its confluence with the Adirnaz River. The district of Karacabey borders the districts of Mudanya and Nilüfer from east, Mustafakemalpaşa and Susurluk from south, Manyas from southwest and Bandırma from west. It is sited on the ancient town of Miletopolis.

Karacabey is an industrial area as well as an agricultural one. It is known as the plantation area of a special variety of onions. There are many famous food factories around Karacabey such as Nestle and many varieties of vegetables and fruits are planted in Karacabey. There is a nearby lake called Uluabat. The Marmara Sea is 32 km to the north.

== History ==
The town is named after a local Turkish chieftain during the Ottoman era named Karaca Bey. The former name of the town was Mihalich (Turkish: Mihaliç), after which a cheese was named, while its ancient name was Miletopolis (Greek: Μιλητόπολις). Miletopolis was apparently the chief settlement of a group of people called the Milatæ, whose name was hellenized to suggest a Milesian colony. Its people colonized Gargara.

Miletopolis was a suffragan of Cyzicus until the 12th or 13th century. Around the end of the twelfth century, it was united with Lopadium as an archbishopric. There are two historical mosques in Karacabey, one being from the 14th century.

From 1867 until 1922, Mihaliç was part of Hüdavendigâr vilayet.

== Composition ==
There are 85 neighbourhoods in Karacabey District:

- Abdullahpaşa
- Akçakoyun
- Akçasusurluk
- Akhisar
- Arız
- Bakırköy
- Ballıkaya
- Bayramdere
- Beylik
- Boğazköy
- Cambaz
- Çamlıca
- Canbalı
- Çarıkköy
- Çavuşköy
- Çeşnigir
- Dağesemen
- Dağkadı
- Danişment
- Doğla
- Drama
- Ekinli
- Ekmekçi
- Emirsultan
- Esentepe
- Eskikaraağaç
- Eskisarıbey
- Fevzipaşa
- Garipçe
- Gazi
- Gölecik
- Gölkıyı
- Gönü
- Güngörmez
- Hamidiye
- Harmanlı
- Hayırlar
- Hotanlı
- Hüdavendigar
- Hürriyet
- İkizce
- İnkaya
- İsmetpaşa
- Karacaahmet
- Karakoca
- Karasu
- Kedikaya
- Keşlik
- Kıranlar
- Küçükkaraağaç
- Kulakpınar
- Kurşunlu
- Mamuriyet
- Mecidiye
- Muratlı
- Nasrettin
- Okçular
- Örencik
- Orhaniye
- Ortasarıbey
- Ova Hamidiye
- Ovaesemen
- Runguşpaşa
- Saadet
- Şahinköy
- Şahmelek
- Sazlıca
- Selimiye
- Seyran
- Sırabademler
- Subaşı
- Sultaniye
- Tabaklar
- Taşlık
- Taşpınar
- Tavşanlı
- Tophisar
- Uluabat
- Yarış
- Yenice
- Yenikaraağaç
- Yenimahalle
- Yenisarıbey
- Yeşildere
- Yolağzı

== See also ==
- Ulubatlı Hasan
