= Çeşnigir, Karacabey =

Village in Turkey

Çeşnigir
- Neighbourhood
- Location in Turkey Çeşnigir (Marmara)
- Coordinates: 40.32°N 28.51°E
- Country: Turkey
- Province: Bursa
- District: Karacabey
- Population (2022): 141
- Time zone: UTC+3 (TRT)

Çeşnigir is a neighbourhood in the municipality and district of Karacabey, Bursa Province in Turkey. Its population is 141 (2022).
