= Çavuşköy, Karacabey =

Village in Turkey

Çavuşköy
- Neighbourhood
- Location in Turkey Çavuşköy (Marmara)
- Coordinates: 40°14′16″N 28°06′42″E
- Country: Turkey
- Province: Bursa
- District: Karacabey
- Population (2022): 269
- Time zone: UTC+3 (TRT)

Çavuşköy is a neighbourhood in the municipality and district of Karacabey, Bursa Province in Turkey. Its population is 269 (2022).
