= Taşköprü, Mustafakemalpaşa =

Village in Turkey

Taşköprü
- Neighbourhood
- Country: Turkey
- Province: Bursa
- District: Mustafakemalpaşa
- Population (2022): 87
- Time zone: UTC+3 (TRT)

Taşköprü is a neighbourhood in the municipality and district of Mustafakemalpaşa, Bursa Province in Turkey. Its population is 87 (2022).
