= Eskisarıbey, Karacabey =

Village in Turkey

Eskisarıbey
- Neighbourhood
- Location in Turkey Eskisarıbey (Marmara)
- Coordinates: 40°08′N 28°14′E
- Country: Turkey
- Province: Bursa
- District: Karacabey
- Population (2022): 318
- Time zone: UTC+3 (TRT)

Eskisarıbey is a neighbourhood in the municipality and district of Karacabey, Bursa Province in Turkey. Its population is 318 (2022).
