= Eskikaraağaç, Karacabey =

Village in Turkey

Eskikaraağaç
- Neighbourhood
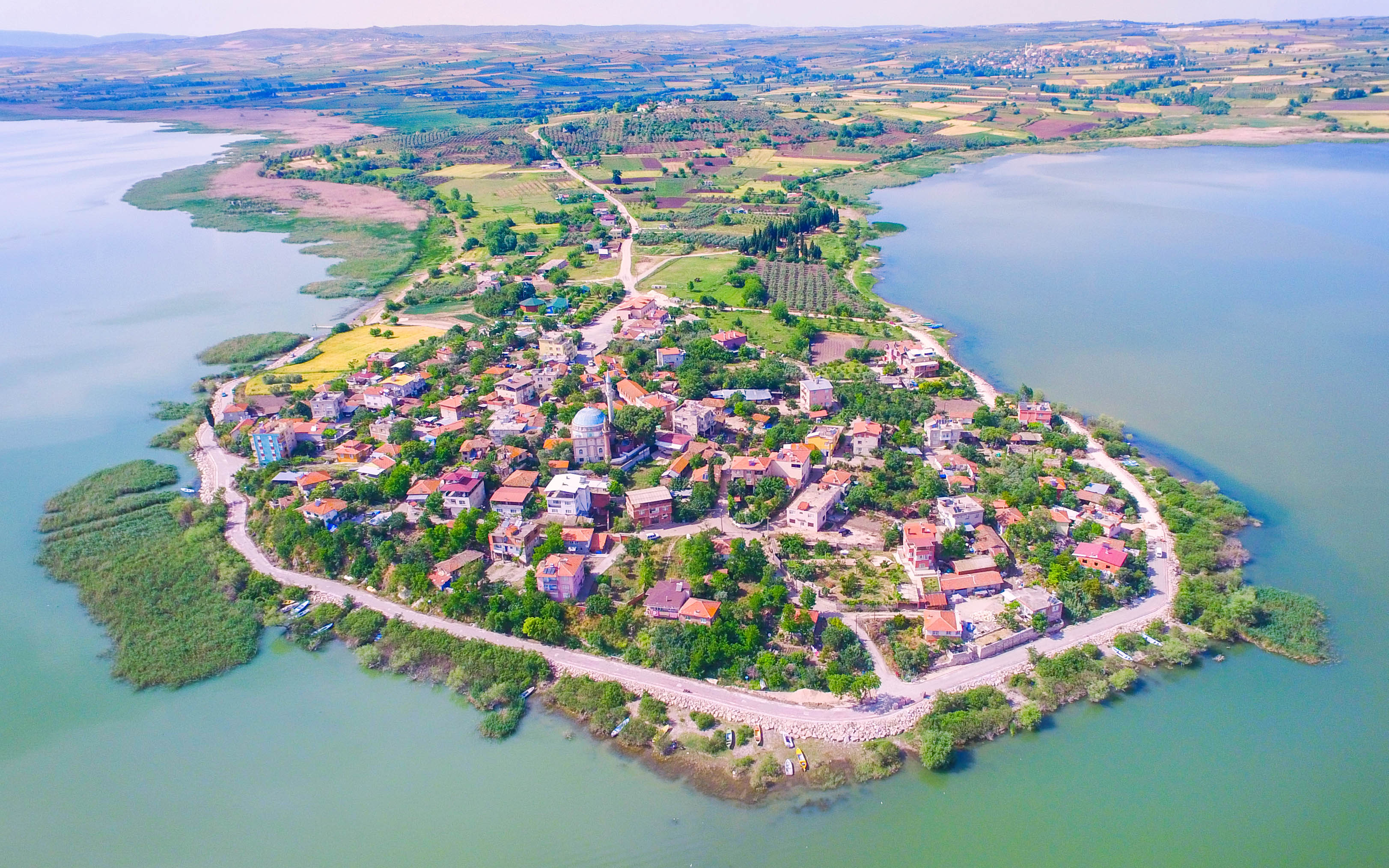

- Location within Turkey Location within Marmara
- Coordinates: 40°11′11″N 28°36′45″E
- Country: Turkey
- Province: Bursa
- District: Karacabey
- Population (2022): 199
- Time zone: UTC+3 (TRT)

Eskikaraağaç is a neighbourhood in the municipality and district of Karacabey, Bursa Province in Turkey. Its population is 199 (2022).

The village is located on a very small peninsula, inshore of Lake Uluabat. The local community is composed of people who emigrated from Drama, Greece, in 1924 as a result of population exchange between Greece and Turkey, and people who immigrated from Bulgaria in 1937.

Eskikaraağaç is a Ramsar site. Local people are mainly employed in agriculture, and fisheries. The village is designated for its dedication to the protection of the white storks and therefore is a member of European Stork Villages Network since 2011. The village has run an annual “Stork Festival” in early summer since 2005. The friendship between a fisherman and a stork (Yaren) in the village was filmed and was awarded as best documentary at the 2020 International Prague Film Awards.

== See also ==
- Yaren (stork)
- Gölyazı
