= Mecidiye, Karacabey =

Village in Turkey

Mecidiye
- Neighbourhood
- Location in Turkey Mecidiye (Marmara)
- Coordinates: 40.210°N 28.352°E
- Country: Turkey
- Province: Bursa
- District: Karacabey
- Population (2022): 1,034
- Time zone: UTC+3 (TRT)

Mecidiye is a neighbourhood in the municipality and district of Karacabey, Bursa Province in Turkey. Its population is 1,034 (2022).
