= Hüdavendigar, Karacabey =

Village in Turkey

Hüdavendigar
- Neighbourhood
- Location in Turkey Hüdavendigar (Marmara)
- Coordinates: 40.223°N 28.361°E
- Country: Turkey
- Province: Bursa
- District: Karacabey
- Population (2022): 2,763
- Time zone: UTC+3 (TRT)

Hüdavendigar is a neighbourhood in the municipality and district of Karacabey, Bursa Province in Turkey. Its population is 2,763 (2022).
