= Dağkadı, Karacabey =

Village in Turkey

Dağkadı
- Neighbourhood
- Location in Turkey Dağkadı (Marmara)
- Coordinates: 40.2579°N 28.1957°E
- Country: Turkey
- Province: Bursa
- District: Karacabey
- Population (2022): 661
- Time zone: UTC+3 (TRT)

Dağkadı is a neighbourhood in the municipality and district of Karacabey, Bursa Province in Turkey. Its population is 661 (2022).
