= Kulakpınar, Karacabey =

Village in Turkey

Kulakpınar
- Neighbourhood
- Location in Turkey Kulakpınar (Marmara)
- Coordinates: 40°17′N 28°23′E
- Country: Turkey
- Province: Bursa
- District: Karacabey
- Population (2022): 209
- Time zone: UTC+3 (TRT)

Kulakpınar is a neighbourhood in the municipality and district of Karacabey, Bursa Province in Turkey. Its population is 209 (2022).
