= Akarca, Mustafakemalpaşa =

Village in Turkey

Akarca
- Neighbourhood
- Location in Turkey Akarca (Marmara)
- Coordinates: 39.9470°N 28.4329°E
- Country: Turkey
- Province: Bursa
- District: Mustafakemalpaşa
- Population (2022): 110
- Time zone: UTC+3 (TRT)

Akarca is a neighbourhood in the municipality and district of Mustafakemalpaşa, Bursa Province in Turkey. Its population is 110 (2022).
