= Kadirçeşme, Mustafakemalpaşa =

Village in Turkey

Kadirçeşme
- Neighbourhood
- Location in Turkey Kadirçeşme (Marmara)
- Coordinates: 40°04′N 28°31′E
- Country: Turkey
- Province: Bursa
- District: Mustafakemalpaşa
- Population (2022): 78
- Time zone: UTC+3 (TRT)

Kadirçeşme is a neighbourhood in the municipality and district of Mustafakemalpaşa, Bursa Province in Turkey. Its population is 78 (2022).
