= Kömürcükadı, Mustafakemalpaşa =

Village in Turkey

Kömürcükadı
- Neighbourhood
- Location in Turkey Kömürcükadı (Marmara)
- Coordinates: 39°56′31″N 28°27′37″E
- Country: Turkey
- Province: Bursa
- District: Mustafakemalpaşa
- Population (2022): 163
- Time zone: UTC+3 (TRT)

Kömürcükadı is a neighbourhood in the municipality and district of Mustafakemalpaşa, Bursa Province in Turkey. Its population is 163 (2022).
