= Okçular, Karacabey =

Village in Turkey

Okçular
- Neighbourhood
- Location in Turkey Okçular (Marmara)
- Coordinates: 40.285°N 28.211°E
- Country: Turkey
- Province: Bursa
- District: Karacabey
- Population (2022): 183
- Time zone: UTC+3 (TRT)

Okçular is a neighbourhood in the Karacabey district, Bursa Province, Turkey. Its population is 183 (2022).

It is located 20 km west of the Karacabey district centre.
