= Yolağzı, Karacabey =

Village in Turkey

Yolağzı
- Neighbourhood
- Location in Turkey Yolağzı (Marmara)
- Coordinates: 40.131°N 28.316°E
- Country: Turkey
- Province: Bursa
- District: Karacabey
- Population (2022): 563
- Time zone: UTC+3 (TRT)
- Postal code: 16706

Yolağzı is a neighbourhood in the municipality and district of Karacabey, Bursa Province in Turkey. Its population is 563 (2022).

It is located 14 km south of Karacabey district centre.
