= Hamidiye, Karacabey =

Village in Turkey

Hamidiye
- Neighbourhood
- Location in Turkey Hamidiye (Marmara)
- Coordinates: 40.226°N 28.371°E
- Country: Turkey
- Province: Bursa
- District: Karacabey
- Population (2022): 3,335
- Time zone: UTC+3 (TRT)

Hamidiye (formerly: Bulgarlar) is a neighbourhood in the municipality and district of Karacabey, Bursa Province in Turkey. Its population is 3,335 (2022).

== History ==
The name of the village is mentioned as Bulgarlar in the 1522 records. The village was settled by Bulgarians expelled from Bulgaria during the reign of Murat I (1362-1389) and became Islamized towards the 18th century.
