= Kedikaya, Karacabey =

Village in Turkey

Kedikaya
- Neighbourhood
- Location in Turkey Kedikaya (Marmara)
- Coordinates: 40°18′N 28°19′E
- Country: Turkey
- Province: Bursa
- District: Karacabey
- Population (2022): 65
- Time zone: UTC+3 (TRT)

Kedikaya is a neighbourhood in the municipality and district of Karacabey, Bursa Province in Turkey. Its population is 65 (2022).
