= El-Arz =

El-Arz الأرز
- Municipality
- Location within Lebanon
- Coordinates: 34.2437500°N 36.0403544°E
- Country: Lebanon
- Governorate: North Governorate
- District: Bsharri District
- Elevation: 1,850 m (6,070 ft)
- Time zone: UTC+2 (EET)
  - Summer (DST): UTC+3 (EEST)
- Postal code: 1377
- Dialing code: +06

El-Arz (Arabic: الأرز, romanized: al-ʾArz, also spelled Al-Arz or Ariz) is a municipality in the Bsharri District of Lebanon. The town is located just west of Bsharri and east of the Cedars of God forest and is 2.5 mi (4.0 km) east of the Baalbek-Hermel Governorate.

== Climate ==
Climate data for El-Arz, elevation 1,916 m (6,286 ft)
Month	Jan	Feb	Mar	Apr	May	Jun	Jul	Aug	Sep	Oct	Nov	Dec	Year
Mean daily maximum °C (°F)	4.0 (39.2)	4.3 (39.7)	6.1 (43.0)	11.1 (52.0)	15.8 (60.4)	18.7 (65.7)	22.2 (72.0)	23.1 (73.6)	20.2 (68.4)	16.6 (61.9)	11.3 (52.3)	7.3 (45.1)	13.4 (56.1)
Daily mean °C (°F)	0.3 (32.5)	0.1 (32.2)	2.2 (36.0)	7.0 (44.6)	12.0 (53.6)	14.8 (58.6)	17.5 (63.5)	18.0 (64.4)	15.1 (59.2)	11.8 (53.2)	7.0 (44.6)	3.5 (38.3)	9.1 (48.4)
Mean daily minimum °C (°F)	−3.0 (26.6)	−3.5 (25.7)	−1.8 (28.8)	2.7 (36.9)	6.9 (44.4)	9.5 (49.1)	11.8 (53.2)	12.6 (54.7)	10.3 (50.5)	7.5 (45.5)	3.7 (38.7)	0.2 (32.4)	4.7 (40.5)
Average precipitation mm (inches)	239 (9.4)	207 (8.1)	145 (5.7)	68 (2.7)	32 (1.3)	5 (0.2)	1 (0.0)	1 (0.0)	5 (0.2)	32 (1.3)	93 (3.7)	158 (6.2)	986 (38.8)
Source: FAO
