= Derekadı, Mustafakemalpaşa =

Village in Turkey

Derekadı
- Neighbourhood
- Location in Turkey Derekadı (Marmara)
- Coordinates: 39°58′N 28°26′E
- Country: Turkey
- Province: Bursa
- District: Mustafakemalpaşa
- Population (2022): 122
- Time zone: UTC+3 (TRT)

Derekadı is a neighbourhood in the municipality and district of Mustafakemalpaşa, Bursa Province in Turkey. Its population is 122 (2022).
