= Akçapınar, Mustafakemalpaşa =

Village in Turkey

Akçapınar
- Neighbourhood
- Location in Turkey Akçapınar (Marmara)
- Coordinates: 40.1127°N 28.6550°E
- Country: Turkey
- Province: Bursa
- District: Mustafakemalpaşa
- Population (2022): 155
- Time zone: UTC+3 (TRT)

Akçapınar is a neighbourhood in the municipality and district of Mustafakemalpaşa, Bursa Province in Turkey. Its population is 155 (2022).
