= Ormankadı, Mustafakemalpaşa =

Village in Turkey

Ormankadı
- Neighbourhood
- Location in Turkey Ormankadı (Marmara)
- Coordinates: 40°09′N 28°27′E
- Country: Turkey
- Province: Bursa
- District: Mustafakemalpaşa
- Population (2022): 1,029
- Time zone: UTC+3 (TRT)

Ormankadı is a neighbourhood in the municipality and district of Mustafakemalpaşa, Bursa Province in Turkey. Its population is 1,029 (2022).
