= Çamlıca, Karacabey =

Village in Turkey

Çamlıca
- Neighbourhood
- Location in Turkey Çamlıca (Marmara)
- Coordinates: 40°19′21″N 28°31′49″E
- Country: Turkey
- Province: Bursa
- District: Karacabey
- Population (2022): 171
- Time zone: UTC+3 (TRT)

Çamlıca is a neighbourhood in the municipality and district of Karacabey, Bursa Province in Turkey. Its population is 171 (2022).
