= Kadıköy, Orhaneli =

Village in Turkey

Kadıköy
- Neighbourhood
- Location in Turkey Kadıköy (Marmara)
- Coordinates: 39.805°N 28.99200°E
- Country: Turkey
- Province: Bursa
- District: Orhaneli
- Population (2022): 93
- Time zone: UTC+3 (TRT)

Kadıköy is a neighbourhood in the municipality and district of Orhaneli, Bursa Province in Turkey. Its population is 93 (2022).
