= Doğla, Karacabey =

Village in Turkey

Doğla
- Neighbourhood
- Location in Turkey Doğla (Marmara)
- Coordinates: 40.284°N 28.238°E
- Country: Turkey
- Province: Bursa
- District: Karacabey
- Population (2022): 280
- Time zone: UTC+3 (TRT)

Doğla is a neighbourhood in the municipality and district of Karacabey, Bursa Province in Turkey. Its population is 280 (2022).
