= Alpagut, Mustafakemalpaşa =

Village in Turkey

Alpagut
- Neighbourhood
- Location in Turkey Alpagut (Marmara)
- Coordinates: 39.8533°N 28.5620°E
- Country: Turkey
- Province: Bursa
- District: Mustafakemalpaşa
- Population (2022): 644
- Time zone: UTC+3 (TRT)

Alpagut (also: Alpağut) is a neighbourhood in the municipality and district of Mustafakemalpaşa, Bursa Province in Turkey. Its population is 644 (2022).
