= Mahaller, Orhaneli =

Village in Turkey

Mahaller
- Neighbourhood
- Location in Turkey Mahaller (Marmara)
- Coordinates: 39°46′34″N 29°01′27″E
- Country: Turkey
- Province: Bursa
- District: Orhaneli
- Population (2022): 104
- Time zone: UTC+3 (TRT)

Mahaller is a neighbourhood in the municipality and district of Orhaneli, Bursa Province in Turkey. Its population is 104 (2022).
