= Kapaklıoluk, Mustafakemalpaşa =

Village in Turkey

Kapaklıoluk
- Neighbourhood
- Location in Turkey Kapaklıoluk (Marmara)
- Coordinates: 40°01′N 28°30′E
- Country: Turkey
- Province: Bursa
- District: Mustafakemalpaşa
- Population (2022): 110
- Time zone: UTC+3 (TRT)

Kapaklıoluk is a neighbourhood in the municipality and district of Mustafakemalpaşa, Bursa Province in Turkey. Its population is 110 (2022).
