= Yukarıbalı, Mustafakemalpaşa =

Village in Turkey

Yukarıbalı
- Neighbourhood
- Location in Turkey Yukarıbalı (Marmara)
- Coordinates: 39°51′N 28°44′E
- Country: Turkey
- Province: Bursa
- District: Mustafakemalpaşa
- Population (2022): 125
- Time zone: UTC+3 (TRT)

Yukarıbalı is a neighbourhood in the municipality and district of Mustafakemalpaşa, Bursa Province in Turkey. Its population is 125 (2022).
