= Aşağıbalı, Mustafakemalpaşa =

Village in Turkey

Aşağıbalı
- Neighbourhood
- Location in Turkey Aşağıbalı (Marmara)
- Coordinates: 39°50′N 28°43′E
- Country: Turkey
- Province: Bursa
- District: Mustafakemalpaşa
- Population (2022): 38
- Time zone: UTC+3 (TRT)

Aşağıbalı is a neighbourhood in the municipality and district of Mustafakemalpaşa, Bursa Province in Turkey. Its population is 38 (2022).
