= Deliballılar, Orhaneli =

Village in Turkey

Deliballılar
- Neighbourhood
- Location in Turkey Deliballılar (Marmara)
- Coordinates: 39°56′N 29°00′E
- Country: Turkey
- Province: Bursa
- District: Orhaneli
- Population (2022): 92
- Time zone: UTC+3 (TRT)

Deliballılar is a neighbourhood in the municipality and district of Orhaneli, Bursa Province in Turkey. Its population is 92 (2022).
