= Alacaat, Mustafakemalpaşa =

Village in Turkey

Alacaat
- Neighbourhood
- Location in Turkey Alacaat (Marmara)
- Coordinates: 39°49′N 28°39′E
- Country: Turkey
- Province: Bursa
- District: Mustafakemalpaşa
- Population (2022): 69
- Time zone: UTC+3 (TRT)

Alacaat is a neighbourhood in the municipality and district of Mustafakemalpaşa, Bursa Province in Turkey. Its population is 69 (2022).
