= Onaç, Mustafakemalpaşa =

Village in Turkey

Onaç
- Neighbourhood
- Location in Turkey Onaç (Marmara)
- Coordinates: 40°05′56″N 28°36′50″E
- Country: Turkey
- Province: Bursa
- District: Mustafakemalpaşa
- Population (2022): 148
- Time zone: UTC+3 (TRT)

Onaç is a neighbourhood in the municipality and district of Mustafakemalpaşa, Bursa Province in Turkey. Its population is 148 (2022).
