= Söğütalan, Mustafakemalpaşa =

Village in Turkey

Söğütalan
- Neighbourhood
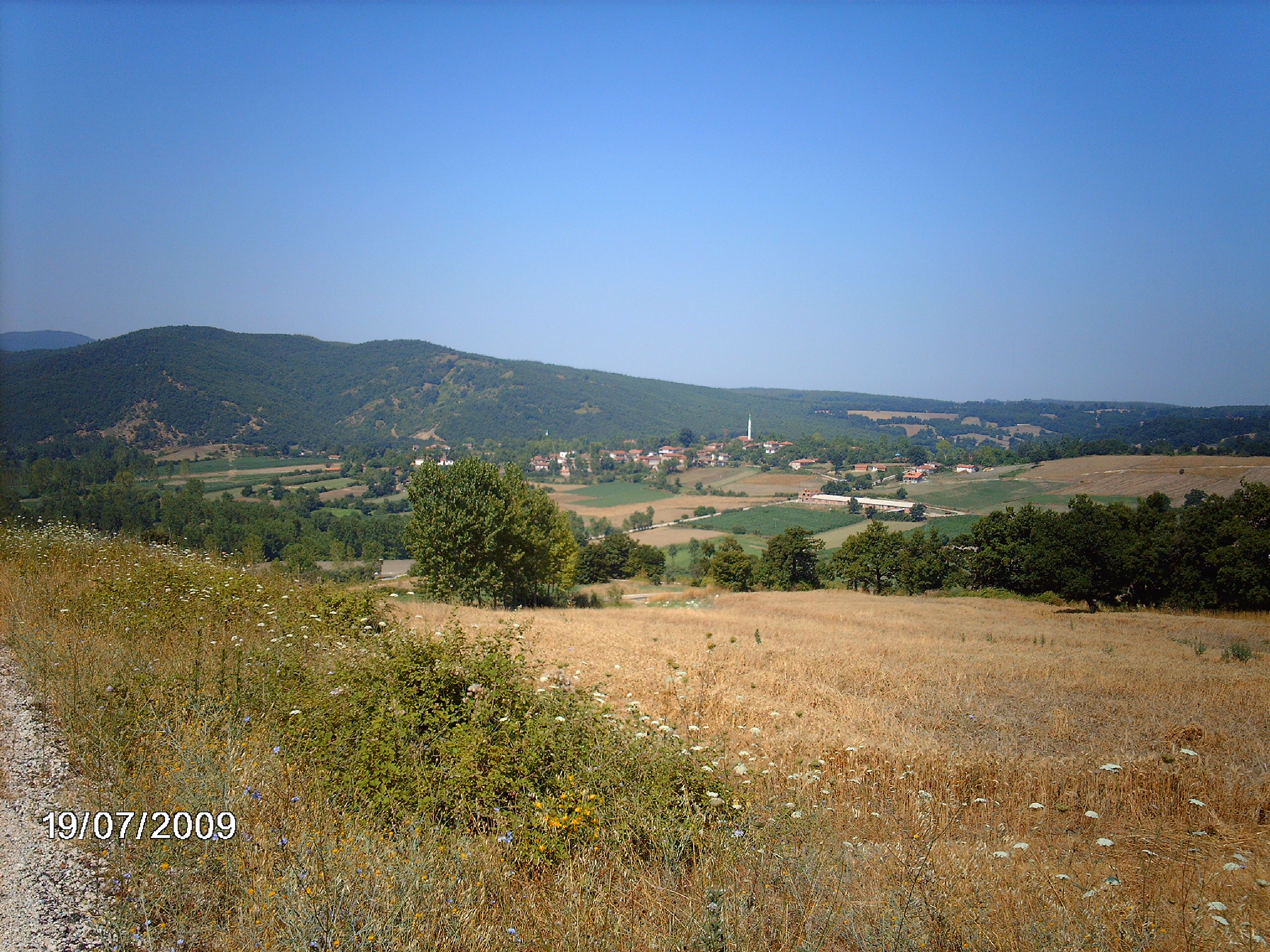

- Location within Turkey Location within Marmara
- Coordinates: 40.061°N 28.572°E
- Country: Turkey
- Province: Bursa
- District: Mustafakemalpaşa
- Population (2022): 234
- Time zone: UTC+3 (TRT)

Söğütalan is a neighbourhood in the municipality and district of Mustafakemalpaşa, Bursa Province in Turkey. Its population is 234 (2022).
