= Yalıntaş =

- Neighbourhood
- Location in Turkey Yalıntaş (Marmara)
- Coordinates: 40°01′N 28°24′E
- Country: Turkey
- Province: Bursa
- District: Mustafakemalpaşa
- Elevation: 40 m (130 ft)
- Population (2022): 6,193
- Time zone: UTC+3 (TRT)
- Postal code: 16536
- Area code: 0224

Yalıntaş (formerly: Mineviz) is a neighbourhood of the municipality and district of Mustafakemalpaşa, Bursa Province, Turkey. Its population is 6,193 (2022). Before the 2013 reorganisation, it was a town (belde). It is almost merged to Mustafakemalpaşa.

== History ==
Yalıntaş was a colony of the Republic of Genoa in the Middle Ages, famed for its high quality kaolinite. After Italians left the settlement, the town became a Greek town both during the Byzantine and the Ottoman periods. After the population exchange between Greece and Turkey agreement in 1923, Greeks were replaced by Turks. In 1996, the settlement was declared a seat of township.

== Economy ==
The economy of the town depends on agriculture. There are also sand quarries around the town.
