= Çeki, Orhaneli =

Village in Turkey

Çeki
- Neighbourhood
- Location in Turkey Çeki (Marmara)
- Coordinates: 39°47′13″N 29°04′19″E
- Country: Turkey
- Province: Bursa
- District: Orhaneli
- Population (2022): 79
- Time zone: UTC+3 (TRT)

Çeki is a neighbourhood in the municipality and district of Orhaneli, Bursa Province in Turkey. Its population is 79 (2022).
