= Akhisar, Karacabey =

Village in Turkey

Akhisar
- Neighbourhood
- Location in Turkey Akhisar (Marmara)
- Coordinates: 40.159°N 28.184°E
- Country: Turkey
- Province: Bursa
- District: Karacabey
- Population (2022): 244
- Time zone: UTC+3 (TRT)

Akhisar is a neighbourhood in the municipality and district of Karacabey, Bursa Province in Turkey. Its population is 244 (2022).

It is located southwest of Karacabey.
