= Bahariye, Mustafakemalpaşa =

Village in Turkey

Bahariye
- Neighbourhood
- Location in Turkey Bahariye (Marmara)
- Coordinates: 39.9401°N 28.4205°E
- Country: Turkey
- Province: Bursa
- District: Mustafakemalpaşa
- Population (2022): 191
- Time zone: UTC+3 (TRT)

Bahariye is a neighbourhood in the municipality and district of Mustafakemalpaşa, Bursa Province in Turkey. Its population is 191 (2022).
