= Akçakoyun, Karacabey =

Village in Turkey

Akçakoyun
- Neighbourhood
- Location in Turkey Akçakoyun (Marmara)
- Coordinates: 40.2586°N 28.3631°E
- Country: Turkey
- Province: Bursa
- District: Karacabey
- Population (2022): 277
- Time zone: UTC+3 (TRT)

Akçakoyun is a neighbourhood in the municipality and district of Karacabey, Bursa Province in Turkey. Its population is 277 (2022).
