= Sarımustafalar, Mustafakemalpaşa =

Village in Turkey

Sarımustafalar
- Neighbourhood
- Location in Turkey Sarımustafalar (Marmara)
- Coordinates: 39°46′23″N 28°34′02″E
- Country: Turkey
- Province: Bursa
- District: Mustafakemalpaşa
- Population (2022): 50
- Time zone: UTC+3 (TRT)

Sarımustafalar is a neighbourhood in the municipality and district of Mustafakemalpaşa, Bursa Province in Turkey. Its population is 50 (2022).
