= Demireli, Mustafakemalpaşa =

Village in Turkey

Demireli
- Neighbourhood
- Location in Turkey Demireli (Marmara)
- Coordinates: 40°02′32″N 28°28′18″E
- Country: Turkey
- Province: Bursa
- District: Mustafakemalpaşa
- Population (2022): 350
- Time zone: UTC+3 (TRT)

Demireli is a neighbourhood in the municipality and district of Mustafakemalpaşa, Bursa Province in Turkey. Its population is 350 (2022).
