= Gölkıyı, Karacabey =

Village in Turkey

Gölkıyı
- Neighbourhood
- Location in Turkey Gölkıyı (Marmara)
- Coordinates: 40°13′N 28°30′E
- Country: Turkey
- Province: Bursa
- District: Karacabey
- Population (2022): 172
- Time zone: UTC+3 (TRT)

Gölkıyı is a neighbourhood in the municipality and district of Karacabey, Bursa Province in Turkey. Its population is 172 (2022).
