= İsmetpaşa, Karacabey =

Village in Turkey

İsmetpaşa
- Neighbourhood
- Location in Turkey İsmetpaşa (Marmara)
- Coordinates: 40.154°N 28.173°E
- Country: Turkey
- Province: Bursa
- District: Karacabey
- Population (2022): 490
- Time zone: UTC+3 (TRT)

İsmetpaşa is a neighbourhood in the municipality and district of Karacabey, Bursa Province in Turkey. Its population is 490 (2022).
