= Yumurcaklı, Mustafakemalpaşa =

Village in Turkey

Yumurcaklı
- Neighbourhood
- Location in Turkey Yumurcaklı (Marmara)
- Coordinates: 40°04′N 28°17′E
- Country: Turkey
- Province: Bursa
- District: Mustafakemalpaşa
- Population (2022): 237
- Time zone: UTC+3 (TRT)

Yumurcaklı is a neighbourhood in the municipality and district of Mustafakemalpaşa, Bursa Province in Turkey. Its population is 237 (2022).
