= Ömeraltı, Mustafakemalpaşa =

Village in Turkey

Ömeraltı
- Neighbourhood
- Location in Turkey Ömeraltı (Marmara)
- Coordinates: 39°59′N 28°46′E
- Country: Turkey
- Province: Bursa
- District: Mustafakemalpaşa
- Population (2022): 75
- Time zone: UTC+3 (TRT)

Ömeraltı is a neighbourhood in the municipality and district of Mustafakemalpaşa, Bursa Province in Turkey. Its population is 75 (2022).
