= Ekinli, Karacabey =

Village in Turkey

Ekinli
- Neighbourhood
- Country: Turkey
- Province: Bursa
- District: Karacabey
- Population (2022): 288
- Time zone: UTC+3 (TRT)

Ekinli is a neighbourhood in the municipality and district of Karacabey, Bursa Province in Turkey. Its population is 288 (2022).
