= Garipçe, Karacabey =

Village in Turkey

Garipçe
- Neighbourhood
- Location in Turkey Garipçe (Marmara)
- Coordinates: 40°13′5″N 28°21′29″E
- Country: Turkey
- Province: Bursa
- District: Karacabey
- Population (2022): 1,193
- Time zone: UTC+3 (TRT)

Garipçe is a neighbourhood in the municipality and district of Karacabey, Bursa Province in Turkey. Its population is 1,193 (2022).
