= Akçasusurluk, Karacabey =

Village in Turkey

Akçasusurluk
- Neighbourhood
- Location in Turkey Akçasusurluk (Marmara)
- Coordinates: 40°18′N 28°26′E
- Country: Turkey
- Province: Bursa
- District: Karacabey
- Population (2022): 182
- Time zone: UTC+3 (TRT)

Akçasusurluk is a neighbourhood in the municipality and district of Karacabey, Bursa Province in Turkey. Its population is 182 (2022).
