= Tatkavaklı =

- Neighbourhood
- Location in Turkey Tatkavaklı (Marmara)
- Coordinates: 40°02′N 28°22′E
- Country: Turkey
- Province: Bursa
- District: Mustafakemalpaşa
- Elevation: 35 m (115 ft)
- Population (2022): 5,179
- Time zone: UTC+3 (TRT)
- Postal code: 16550
- Area code: 0224

Tatkavaklı (formerly: Kavaklı) is a neighbourhood of the municipality and district of Mustafakemalpaşa, Bursa Province, Turkey. Its population is 5,179 (2022). Before the 2013 reorganisation, it was a town (belde).

== Geography ==
Tatkavaklı is on Turkish state road D.573 which connects Bursa to İzmir. Its distance to Mustafakemalpaşa is 4 kilometres (2.5 mi) and to Bursa is 89 kilometres (55 mi).

== History ==
The settlement was founded by a group of families that migrated from Kangal (Sivas Province, east of Central Anatolia), in the early 16th century. The first building of the settlement was a mosque commissioned by Sipahi Kapucu, a tımarlı sipahi (fief holder) of the Ottoman Empire, in 1505. The earlier name of the settlement was Kavaklı ("with poplar"). In 1973, it was given its current name, after the Tat Canning Factory.

== Economy ==
The economy of the town depends on agriculture. There is a tomato paste factory and a dairy products factory around the town.
