= Bayramdere, Karacabey =

Village in Turkey

Bayramdere
- Neighbourhood
- Location in Turkey Bayramdere (Marmara)
- Coordinates: 40.3781°N 28.3884°E
- Country: Turkey
- Province: Bursa
- District: Karacabey
- Population (2022): 1,527
- Time zone: UTC+3 (TRT)

Bayramdere is a neighbourhood in the municipality and district of Karacabey, Bursa Province in Turkey. Its population is 1,527 (2022).
