= Camandar, Mustafakemalpaşa =

Village in Turkey

Camandar
- Neighbourhood
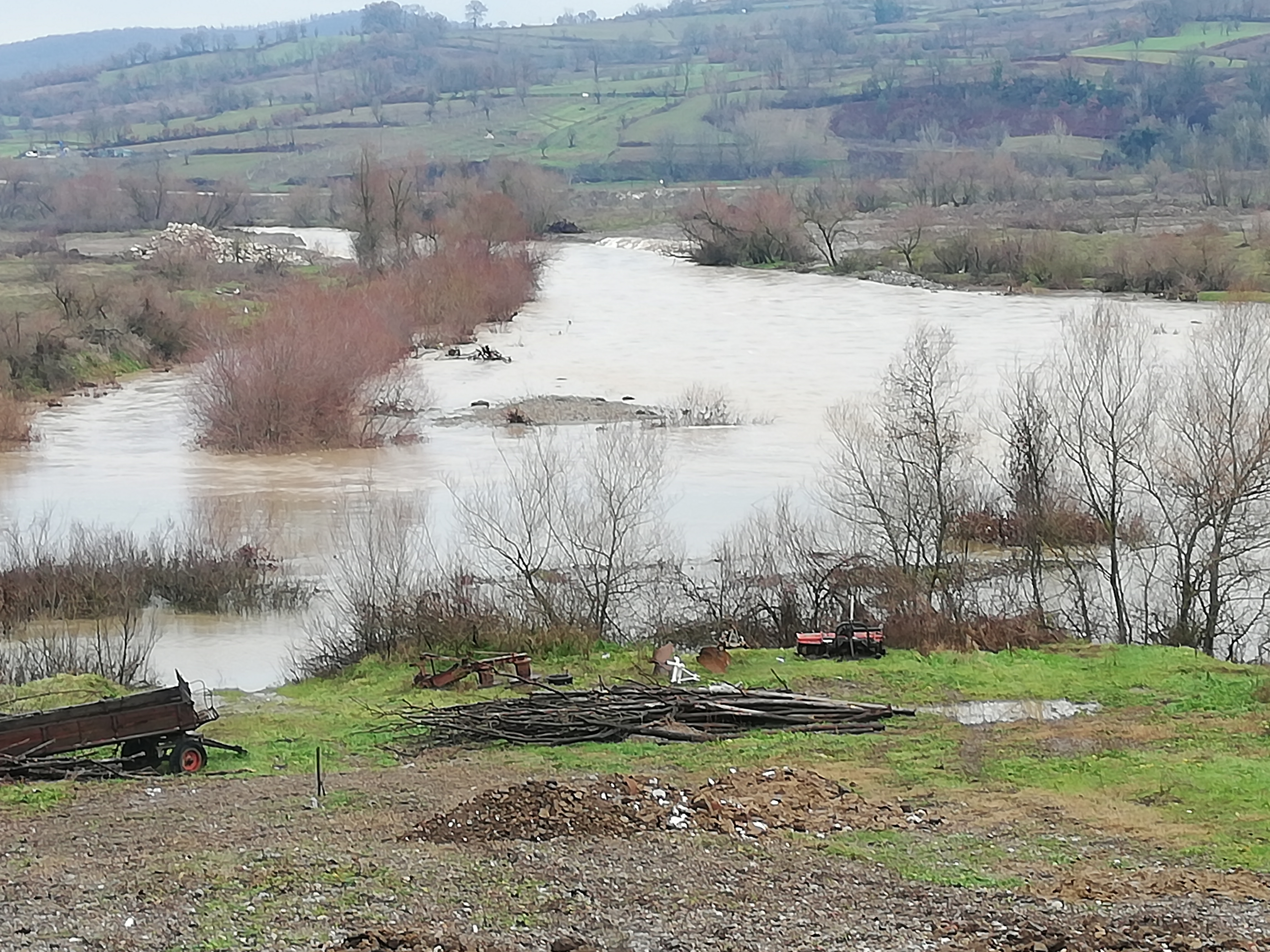

- Location within Turkey Location within Marmara
- Coordinates: 39°56′46″N 28°32′03″E
- Country: Turkey
- Province: Bursa
- District: Mustafakemalpaşa
- Population (2022): 137
- Time zone: UTC+3 (TRT)

Camandar is a neighbourhood in the municipality and district of Mustafakemalpaşa, Bursa Province in Turkey. Its population is 137 (2022).
