= Dereköy, Orhaneli =

Village in Turkey

Dereköy
- Neighbourhood
- Country: Turkey
- Province: Bursa
- District: Orhaneli
- Population (2022): 62
- Time zone: UTC+3 (TRT)

Dereköy is a neighbourhood in the municipality and district of Orhaneli, Bursa Province in Turkey. Its population is 62 (2022).
