= Bostandere, Mustafakemalpaşa =

Village in Turkey

Bostandere
- Neighbourhood
- Location in Turkey Bostandere (Marmara)
- Coordinates: 39.9807°N 28.2641°E
- Country: Turkey
- Province: Bursa
- District: Mustafakemalpaşa
- Population (2022): 243
- Time zone: UTC+3 (TRT)

Bostandere is a neighbourhood in the municipality and district of Mustafakemalpaşa, Bursa Province in Turkey. Its population is 243 (2022).
