= Fevzipaşa, Karacabey =

Village in Turkey

Fevzipaşa
- Neighbourhood
- Country: Turkey
- Province: Bursa
- District: Karacabey
- Population (2022): 234
- Time zone: UTC+3 (TRT)

Fevzipaşa is a neighbourhood in the municipality and district of Karacabey, Bursa Province in Turkey. Its population is 234 (2022).
