= Subaşı, Karacabey =

Village in Turkey

Subaşı
- Neighbourhood
- Location in Turkey Subaşı (Marmara)
- Coordinates: 40°16′8″N 28°32′10″E
- Country: Turkey
- Province: Bursa
- District: Karacabey
- Population (2022): 648
- Time zone: UTC+3 (TRT)

Subaşı is a neighbourhood in the municipality and district of Karacabey, Bursa Province in Turkey. Its population is 648 (2022).
