= Kumkadı, Mustafakemalpaşa =

Village in Turkey

Kumkadı
- Neighbourhood
- Location in Turkey Kumkadı (Marmara)
- Coordinates: 40°09′N 28°28′E
- Country: Turkey
- Province: Bursa
- District: Mustafakemalpaşa
- Population (2022): 787
- Time zone: UTC+3 (TRT)

Kumkadı is a neighbourhood in the municipality and district of Mustafakemalpaşa, Bursa Province in Turkey. Its population is 787 (2022).
