= Doğanalan, Mustafakemalpaşa =

Village in Turkey

Doğanalan
- Neighbourhood
- Location in Turkey Doğanalan (Marmara)
- Coordinates: 40°05′34″N 28°40′12″E
- Country: Turkey
- Province: Bursa
- District: Mustafakemalpaşa
- Population (2022): 187
- Time zone: UTC+3 (TRT)

Doğanalan is a neighbourhood in the municipality and district of Mustafakemalpaşa, Bursa Province in Turkey. Its population is 187 (2022).
