= Beylik, Karacabey =

Village in Turkey

Beylik
- Neighbourhood
- Location in Turkey Beylik (Marmara)
- Coordinates: 40.0958°N 28.1826°E
- Country: Turkey
- Province: Bursa
- District: Karacabey
- Population (2022): 610
- Time zone: UTC+3 (TRT)

Beylik is a neighbourhood in the municipality and district of Karacabey, Bursa Province in Turkey. Its population is 610 (2022).
