= Karıncalı, Orhaneli =

Karıncalı
- Neighbourhood
- Location in Turkey Karıncalı (Marmara)
- Coordinates: 39°58′N 28°52′E
- Country: Turkey
- Province: Bursa
- District: Orhaneli
- Elevation: 400 m (1,300 ft)
- Population (2022): 1,308
- Time zone: UTC+3 (TRT)
- Postal code: 16980
- Area code: 0224

Karıncalı is a neighbourhood of the municipality and district of Orhaneli, Bursa Province, Turkey. Its population is 1,308 (2022). Before the 2013 reorganisation, it was a town (belde). It is situated to the north of Orhaneli creek. The distance to Orhaneli is 8 kilometres (5 mi).

Although the present name of the town Karıncalı means "with ant" the original name Karın refers to maternal brothers. The settlement was founded by 10 families of Turkmen Kayı tribe after Orhan of Ottoman Empire captured Orhaneli in early 14th century. In 1994, the settlement was declared a seat of township.
