= Hotanlı, Karacabey =

Village in Turkey

Hotanlı
- Neighbourhood
- Location in Turkey Hotanlı (Marmara)
- Coordinates: 40.210°N 28.309°E
- Country: Turkey
- Province: Bursa
- District: Karacabey
- Population (2022): 354
- Time zone: UTC+3 (TRT)

Hotanlı is a neighbourhood in the municipality and district of Karacabey, Bursa Province in Turkey. Its population is 354 (2022).
