= İkizce, Karacabey =

Village in Turkey

İkizce
- Neighbourhood
- Location in Turkey İkizce (Marmara)
- Coordinates: 40.225°N 28.658°E
- Country: Turkey
- Province: Bursa
- District: Karacabey
- Population (2022): 430
- Time zone: UTC+3 (TRT)

İkizce is a neighbourhood in the municipality and district of Karacabey, Bursa Province in Turkey. Its population is 430 (2022).
