= Dağesemen, Karacabey =

Village in Turkey

Dağesemen
- Neighbourhood
- Location in Turkey Dağesemen (Marmara)
- Coordinates: 40°18′N 28°20′E
- Country: Turkey
- Province: Bursa
- District: Karacabey
- Population (2022): 82
- Time zone: UTC+3 (TRT)

Dağesemen is a neighbourhood in the municipality and district of Karacabey, Bursa Province in Turkey. Its population is 82 (2022).
