= Danişment, Karacabey =

Village in Turkey

Danişment
- Neighbourhood
- Location in Turkey Danişment (Marmara)
- Coordinates: 40.227°N 28.133°E
- Country: Turkey
- Province: Bursa
- District: Karacabey
- Population (2022): 348
- Time zone: UTC+3 (TRT)

Danişment is a neighbourhood in the municipality and district of Karacabey, Bursa Province in Turkey. Its population is 348 (2022).
