= Güngörmez, Karacabey =

Village in Turkey

Güngörmez
- Neighbourhood
- Country: Turkey
- Province: Bursa
- District: Karacabey
- Population (2022): 110
- Time zone: UTC+3 (TRT)

Güngörmez is a neighbourhood in the municipality and district of Karacabey, Bursa Province in Turkey. Its population is 110 (2022).
