= Sünlük, Mustafakemalpaşa =

Village in Turkey

Sünlük
- Neighbourhood
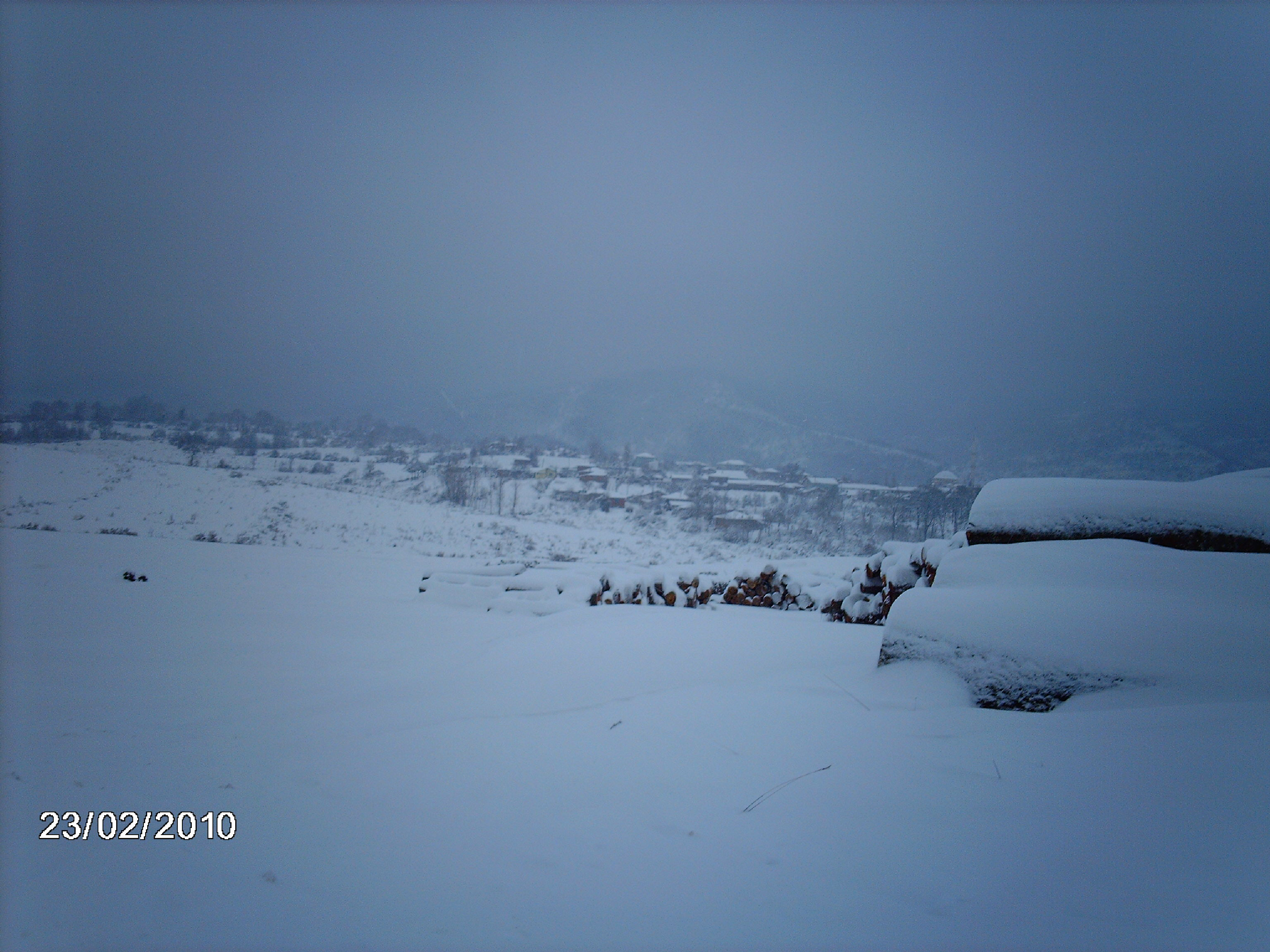

- Location within Turkey Location within Marmara
- Country: Turkey
- Province: Bursa
- District: Mustafakemalpaşa
- Population (2022): 448
- Time zone: UTC+3 (TRT)

Sünlük is a neighbourhood in the municipality and district of Mustafakemalpaşa, Bursa Province in Turkey. Its population is 448 (2022).
