= Aralık, Mustafakemalpaşa =

Village in Turkey

Aralık
- Neighbourhood
- Location in Turkey Aralık (Marmara)
- Coordinates: 40.0343°N 28.4613°E
- Country: Turkey
- Province: Bursa
- District: Mustafakemalpaşa
- Population (2022): 258
- Time zone: UTC+3 (TRT)

Aralık is a neighbourhood in the municipality and district of Mustafakemalpaşa, Bursa Province in Turkey. Its population is 258 (2022).
