= Muratlı, Karacabey =

Village in Turkey

Muratlı
- Neighbourhood
- Location in Turkey Muratlı (Marmara)
- Coordinates: 40.285°N 28.606°E
- Country: Turkey
- Province: Bursa
- District: Karacabey
- Population (2022): 262
- Time zone: UTC+3 (TRT)

Muratlı is a neighbourhood in the Karacabey district, Bursa Province, Turkey. Its population is 262 (2022).
