= Hayırlar, Karacabey =

Village in Turkey

Hayırlar
- Neighbourhood
- Country: Turkey
- Province: Bursa
- District: Karacabey
- Population (2022): 119
- Time zone: UTC+3 (TRT)

Hayırlar is a neighbourhood in the municipality and district of Karacabey, Bursa Province in Turkey. Its population is 119 (2022).
