= Ekmekçi, Karacabey =

Village in Turkey

Ekmekçi
- Neighbourhood
- Location in Turkey Ekmekçi (Marmara)
- Coordinates: 40.325°N 28.458°E
- Country: Turkey
- Province: Bursa
- District: Karacabey
- Population (2022): 289
- Time zone: UTC+3 (TRT)

Ekmekçi is a neighbourhood in the municipality and district of Karacabey, Bursa Province in Turkey. Its population is 289 (2022).
