= Çardakbelen, Mustafakemalpaşa =

Village in Turkey

Çardakbelen
- Neighbourhood
- Location in Turkey Çardakbelen (Marmara)
- Coordinates: 39°58′N 28°30′E
- Country: Turkey
- Province: Bursa
- District: Mustafakemalpaşa
- Population (2022): 182
- Time zone: UTC+3 (TRT)

Çardakbelen is a neighbourhood in the municipality and district of Mustafakemalpaşa, Bursa Province in Turkey. Its population is 182 (2022).
