= Tophisar, Karacabey =

Village in Turkey

Tophisar
- Neighbourhood
- Location in Turkey Tophisar (Marmara)
- Coordinates: 40°13′N 28°10′E
- Country: Turkey
- Province: Bursa
- District: Karacabey
- Population (2022): 326
- Time zone: UTC+3 (TRT)

Tophisar is a neighbourhood in the municipality and district of Karacabey, Bursa Province in Turkey. Its population is 326 (2022).

It is located 15 km west of Karacabey district centre.
