= Küçükorhan, Orhaneli =

Village in Turkey

Küçükorhan
- Neighbourhood
- Location in Turkey Küçükorhan (Marmara)
- Coordinates: 39°48′N 29°02′E
- Country: Turkey
- Province: Bursa
- District: Orhaneli
- Population (2022): 94
- Time zone: UTC+3 (TRT)

Küçükorhan is a neighbourhood in the municipality and district of Orhaneli, Bursa Province in Turkey. Its population is 94 (2022).
