= Koşuboğazı, Mustafakemalpaşa =

Village in Turkey

Koşuboğazı
- Neighbourhood
- Location in Turkey Koşuboğazı (Marmara)
- Coordinates: 40°03′N 28°15′E
- Country: Turkey
- Province: Bursa
- District: Mustafakemalpaşa
- Population (2022): 966
- Time zone: UTC+3 (TRT)

Koşuboğazı is a neighbourhood in the municipality and district of Mustafakemalpaşa, Bursa Province in Turkey. Its population is 966 (2022).
