= Güveçdere, Mustafakemalpaşa =

Village in Turkey

Güveçdere
- Neighbourhood
- Location in Turkey Güveçdere (Marmara)
- Coordinates: 39°57′N 28°25′E
- Country: Turkey
- Province: Bursa
- District: Mustafakemalpaşa
- Population (2022): 68
- Time zone: UTC+3 (TRT)

Güveçdere is a neighbourhood in the municipality and district of Mustafakemalpaşa, Bursa Province in Turkey. Its population is 68 (2022).
