= Çaltılıbük, Mustafakemalpaşa =

Village in Turkey

Çaltılıbük
- Neighbourhood
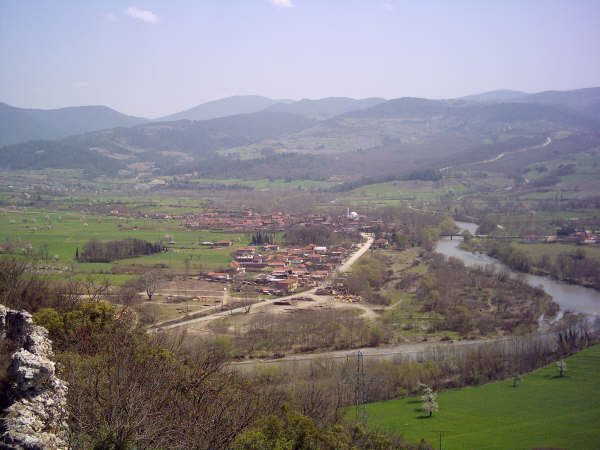

- Location within Turkey Location within Marmara
- Coordinates: 39°57′N 28°36′E
- Country: Turkey
- Province: Bursa
- District: Mustafakemalpaşa
- Population (2022): 274
- Time zone: UTC+3 (TRT)

Çaltılıbük is a neighbourhood in the municipality and district of Mustafakemalpaşa, Bursa Province in Turkey. Its population is 274 (2022).
