= Kabulbaba, Mustafakemalpaşa =

Village in Turkey

Kabulbaba
- Neighbourhood
- Location in Turkey Kabulbaba (Marmara)
- Coordinates: 40°01′N 28°35′E
- Country: Turkey
- Province: Bursa
- District: Mustafakemalpaşa
- Population (2022): 183
- Time zone: UTC+3 (TRT)

Kabulbaba is a neighbourhood in the municipality and district of Mustafakemalpaşa, Bursa Province in Turkey. Its population is 183 (2022).
