= Derecik, Mustafakemalpaşa =

Village in Turkey

Derecik
- Neighbourhood
- Country: Turkey
- Province: Bursa
- District: Mustafakemalpaşa
- Population (2022): 257
- Time zone: UTC+3 (TRT)

Derecik is a neighbourhood in the municipality and district of Mustafakemalpaşa, Bursa Province in Turkey. Its population is 257 (2022).
