= Ayaz, Mustafakemalpaşa =

Village in Turkey

Ayaz
- Neighbourhood
- Location in Turkey Ayaz (Marmara)
- Coordinates: 40.0974°N 28.4890°E
- Country: Turkey
- Province: Bursa
- District: Mustafakemalpaşa
- Population (2022): 362
- Time zone: UTC+3 (TRT)

Ayaz is a neighbourhood in the municipality and district of Mustafakemalpaşa, Bursa Province in Turkey. Its population is 362 (2022).
