= Kurşunlu, Karacabey =

Village in Turkey

Kurşunlu
- Neighbourhood
- Location in Turkey Kurşunlu (Marmara)
- Coordinates: 40.398°N 28.278°E
- Country: Turkey
- Province: Bursa
- District: Karacabey
- Population (2022): 761
- Time zone: UTC+3 (TRT)

Kurşunlu is a neighbourhood in the municipality and district of Karacabey, Bursa Province in Turkey. Its population is 761 (2022).
