= Eskibalçık, Mustafakemalpaşa =

Village in Turkey

Eskibalçık
- Neighbourhood
- Location in Turkey Eskibalçık (Marmara)
- Coordinates: 39°54′N 28°36′E
- Country: Turkey
- Province: Bursa
- District: Mustafakemalpaşa
- Population (2022): 112
- Time zone: UTC+3 (TRT)

Eskibalçık is a neighbourhood in the municipality and district of Mustafakemalpaşa, Bursa Province in Turkey. Its population is 112 (2022).
