= Çöreler, Orhaneli =

Village in Turkey

Çöreler
- Neighbourhood
- Location in Turkey Çöreler (Marmara)
- Coordinates: 39°57′N 28°57′E
- Country: Turkey
- Province: Bursa
- District: Orhaneli
- Population (2022): 552
- Time zone: UTC+3 (TRT)

Çöreler is a neighbourhood in the municipality and district of Orhaneli, Bursa Province in Turkey. Its population is 552 (2022).
