= Orhaneli =

- District and municipality
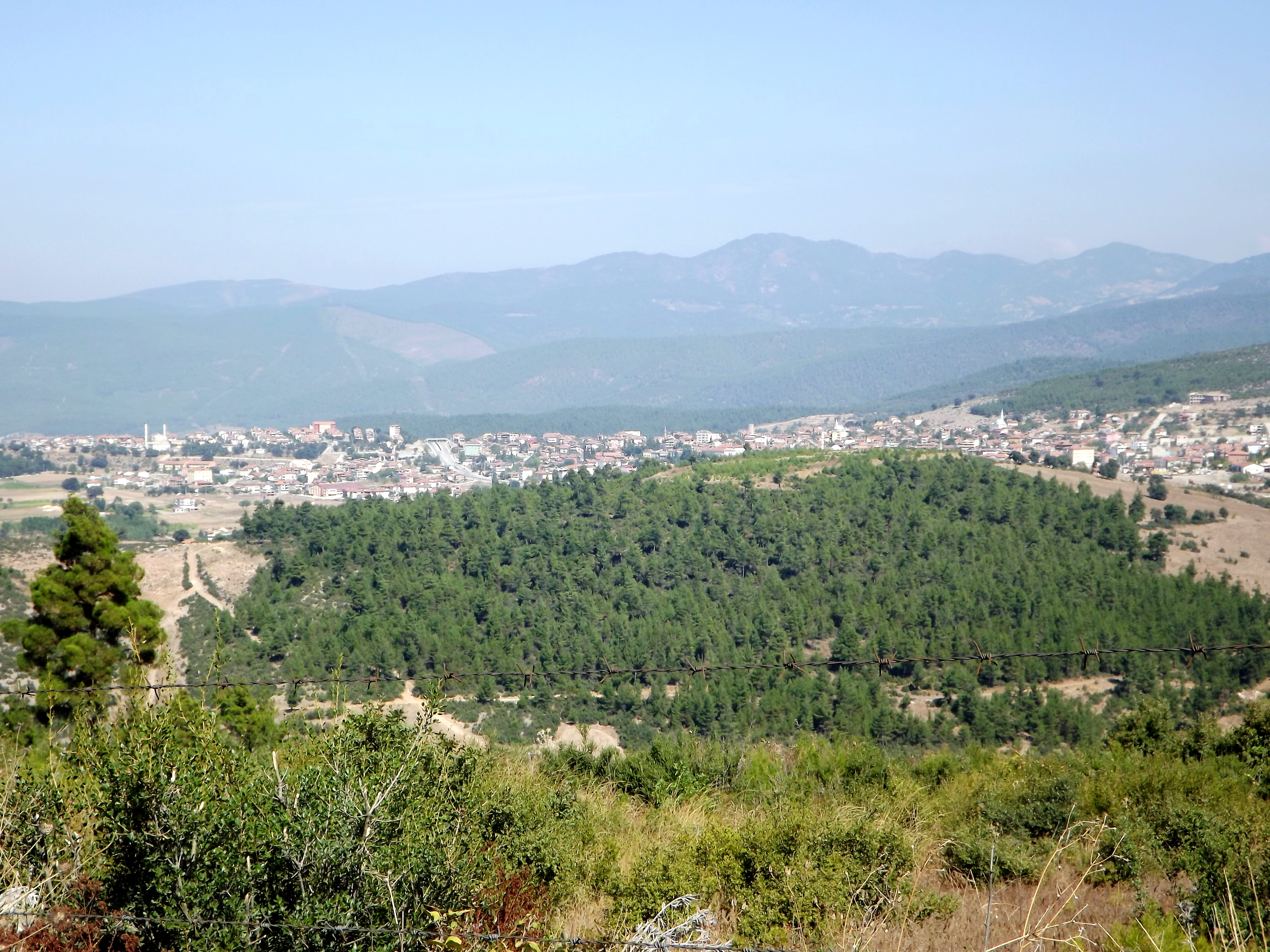

- Map showing Orhaneli District in Bursa Province

- Location within Turkey Location within Marmara
- Coordinates: 39°54′10″N 28°59′15″E
- Country: Turkey
- Province: Bursa

Government
  - Mayor: Ali Osman Tayir (AKP)
- Area: 838 km^{2} (324 sq mi)
- Population (2022): 18,543
  - Density: 22.1/km^{2} (57.3/sq mi)
- Time zone: UTC+3 (TRT)
- Postal code: 16980
- Area code: 0224
- Website: www.orhaneli.bel.tr

Orhaneli is a municipality and district of Bursa Province, Turkey. Its area is 838 km^{2}, and its population is 18,543 (2022).

== History ==
From 1867 until 1922, Orhaneli (then named Adranos) was part of Hüdavendigâr vilayet. The district has been significantly impacted by wildfires during the summer of 2025.

== Composition ==
There are 61 neighbourhoods in Orhaneli District:

- 300 Evler
- Ağaçhisar
- Akalan
- Akçabük
- Altıntaş
- Argın
- Balıoğlu
- Başköy
- Belenoluk
- Çeki
- Celepler
- Çınarcık
- Çivili
- Çöreler
- Dağgüney
- Deliballılar
- Demirci
- Dereköy
- Dündarköy
- Emirköy
- Erenler
- Esentepe
- Eskidanişment
- Fadılköy
- Fevzipaşa
- Firuzköy
- Gazioluk
- Gazipaşa
- Girencik
- Göktepe
- Göynükbelen
- Gümüşpınar
- İkizoluk
- İsmetpaşa
- Kabaklar
- Kadıköy
- Karabekirpaşa
- Karaoğlanlar
- Karasiköy
- Karıncalı
- Koçu
- Küçükorhan
- Kusumlar
- Letafet
- Mahaller
- Nalınlar
- Ortaköy
- Osmaniyeçatak
- Sadağı
- Semerci
- Serçeler
- Sırıl
- Söğüt
- Şükriye
- Süleymanbey
- Tepecik
- Topuk
- Yakuplar
- Yenidanişment
- Yeşiller
- Yürücekler
