= Dündarköy, Orhaneli =

Village in Turkey

Dündarköy
- Neighbourhood
- Location in Turkey Dündarköy (Marmara)
- Coordinates: 39°53′28″N 28°51′29″E
- Country: Turkey
- Province: Bursa
- District: Orhaneli
- Population (2022): 148
- Time zone: UTC+3 (TRT)

Dündarköy is a neighbourhood in the municipality and district of Orhaneli, Bursa Province in Turkey. Its population is 148 (2022).
