= Sincansarnıç, Mustafakemalpaşa =

Neighborhood in Bursa Province, Turkey

Sincansarnıç
- Neighbourhood
- Location in Turkey Sincansarnıç (Marmara)
- Coordinates: 40°3′44″N 28°41′18″E
- Country: Turkey
- Province: Bursa
- District: Mustafakemalpaşa
- Population (2022): 435
- Time zone: UTC+3 (TRT)

Sincansarnıç is a neighbourhood in the municipality and district of Mustafakemalpaşa, Bursa Province in Turkey. Its population is 435 (2022).

== Geography ==
It is 115 km from Bursa city center and 30 km from Mustafakemalpaşa district center.

== Population ==
Historical population
| Year | Pop. | ±% p.a. |
|---|---|---|
| 1997 | 397 | — |
| 2007 | 415 | +0.44% |
| 2012 | 396 | −0.93% |
| 2017 | 360 | −1.89% |
| 2022 | 435 | +3.86% |
Source: 1997 census and TÜIK (2007-2022)
