= Döllük, Mustafakemalpaşa =

Village in Turkey

Döllük
- Neighbourhood
- Location in Turkey Döllük (Marmara)
- Coordinates: 39.959°N 28.518°E
- Country: Turkey
- Province: Bursa
- District: Mustafakemalpaşa
- Population (2022): 80
- Time zone: UTC+3 (TRT)

Döllük is a neighbourhood in the municipality and district of Mustafakemalpaşa, Bursa Province in Turkey. Its population is 80 (2022).
