= Gündoğdu, Mustafakemalpaşa =

Village in Turkey

Gündoğdu
- Neighbourhood
- Location in Turkey Gündoğdu (Marmara)
- Coordinates: 39°53′56″N 28°33′43″E
- Country: Turkey
- Province: Bursa
- District: Mustafakemalpaşa
- Population (2022): 181
- Time zone: UTC+3 (TRT)

Gündoğdu is a neighbourhood in the municipality and district of Mustafakemalpaşa, Bursa Province in Turkey. Its population is 181 (2022).
