= Gölecik, Karacabey =

Village in Turkey

Gölecik
- Neighbourhood
- Location in Turkey Gölecik (Marmara)
- Coordinates: 40.279°N 28.299°E
- Country: Turkey
- Province: Bursa
- District: Karacabey
- Population (2022): 71
- Time zone: UTC+3 (TRT)

Gölecik is a neighbourhood in the municipality and district of Karacabey, Bursa Province in Turkey. Its population is 71 (2022).
