= Demirci, Orhaneli =

Village in Turkey

Demirci
- Neighbourhood
- Country: Turkey
- Province: Bursa
- District: Orhaneli
- Population (2022): 142
- Time zone: UTC+3 (TRT)

Demirci is a neighbourhood in the municipality and district of Orhaneli, Bursa Province in Turkey. Its population is 142 (2022).
