= Hürriyet, Karacabey =

Village in Turkey

Hürriyet
- Neighbourhood
- Location in Turkey Hürriyet (Marmara)
- Coordinates: 40.282°N 28.645°E
- Country: Turkey
- Province: Bursa
- District: Karacabey
- Population (2022): 267
- Time zone: UTC+3 (TRT)

Hürriyet is a neighbourhood in the municipality and district of Karacabey, Bursa Province in Turkey. Its population is 267 (2022).
