= Kıranlar, Karacabey =

Village in Turkey

Kıranlar
- Neighbourhood
- Location in Turkey Kıranlar (Marmara)
- Coordinates: 40°16′N 28°19′E
- Country: Turkey
- Province: Bursa
- District: Karacabey
- Population (2022): 147
- Time zone: UTC+3 (TRT)

Kıranlar is a neighbourhood in the municipality and district of Karacabey, Bursa Province in Turkey. Its population is 147 (2022).
