= Ortaköy, Orhaneli =

Village in Turkey

Ortaköy
- Neighbourhood
- Location in Turkey Ortaköy (Marmara)
- Coordinates: 40.049°N 28.852°E
- Country: Turkey
- Province: Bursa
- District: Orhaneli
- Population (2022): 146
- Time zone: UTC+3 (TRT)

Ortaköy is a neighbourhood in the municipality and district of Orhaneli, Bursa Province in Turkey. Its population is 146 (2022).
