= Ortasarıbey, Karacabey =

Village in Turkey

Ortasarıbey
- Neighbourhood
- Location in Turkey Ortasarıbey (Marmara)
- Coordinates: 40°09′N 28°14′E
- Country: Turkey
- Province: Bursa
- District: Karacabey
- Population (2022): 373
- Time zone: UTC+3 (TRT)

Ortasarıbey is a neighbourhood in the municipality and district of Karacabey, Bursa Province in Turkey. Its population is 373 (2022).
