= Nalınlar, Orhaneli =

Village in Turkey

Nalınlar
- Neighbourhood
- Location in Turkey Nalınlar (Marmara)
- Coordinates: 40°01′26″N 28°53′46″E
- Country: Turkey
- Province: Bursa
- District: Orhaneli
- Population (2022): 251
- Time zone: UTC+3 (TRT)

Nalınlar is a neighbourhood in the municipality and district of Orhaneli, Bursa Province in Turkey. Its population is 251 (2022).
