= Harmanlı, Karacabey =

Village in Turkey

Harmanlı
- Neighbourhood
- Location in Turkey Harmanlı (Marmara)
- Coordinates: 40.246°N 28.424°E
- Country: Turkey
- Province: Bursa
- District: Karacabey
- Population (2022): 490
- Time zone: UTC+3 (TRT)

Harmanlı is a neighbourhood in the municipality and district of Karacabey, Bursa Province in Turkey. Its population is 490 (2022).
