= Ballıkaya, Karacabey =

Village in Turkey

Ballıkaya
- Neighbourhood
- Location in Turkey Ballıkaya (Marmara)
- Coordinates: 40.3660°N 28.5298°E
- Country: Turkey
- Province: Bursa
- District: Karacabey
- Population (2022): 89
- Time zone: UTC+3 (TRT)

Ballıkaya is a neighbourhood in the municipality and district of Karacabey, Bursa Province in Turkey. Its population is 89 (2022).
