= Karakoca, Karacabey =

Village in Turkey

Karakoca
- Neighbourhood
- Location in Turkey Karakoca (Marmara)
- Coordinates: 40°15′48″N 28°33′44″E
- Country: Turkey
- Province: Bursa
- District: Karacabey
- Population (2022): 749
- Time zone: UTC+3 (TRT)

Karakoca is a neighbourhood in the municipality and district of Karacabey, Bursa Province in Turkey. Its population is 749 (2022).
