= Girencik, Orhaneli =

Village in Turkey

Girencik
- Neighbourhood
- Country: Turkey
- Province: Bursa
- District: Orhaneli
- Population (2022): 64
- Time zone: UTC+3 (TRT)

Girencik is a neighbourhood in the municipality and district of Orhaneli, Bursa Province in Turkey. Its population is 64 (2022).
