= Başköy, Orhaneli =

Village in Turkey

Başköy
- Neighbourhood
- Location in Turkey Başköy (Marmara)
- Coordinates: 40.0572°N 28.8409°E
- Country: Turkey
- Province: Bursa
- District: Orhaneli
- Population (2022): 266
- Time zone: UTC+3 (TRT)

Başköy is a neighbourhood in the municipality and district of Orhaneli, Bursa Province in Turkey. Its population is 266 (2022).
