= Kestelek, Mustafakemalpaşa =

Village in Turkey

Kestelek
- Neighbourhood
- Location in Turkey Kestelek (Marmara)
- Coordinates: 39°57′27″N 28°34′21″E
- Country: Turkey
- Province: Bursa
- District: Mustafakemalpaşa
- Population (2022): 291
- Time zone: UTC+3 (TRT)

Kestelek is a neighbourhood in the municipality and district of Mustafakemalpaşa, Bursa Province in Turkey. Its population is 291 (2022).
