= Osmaniyeçatak, Orhaneli =

Village in Turkey

Osmaniyeçatak
- Neighbourhood
- Location in Turkey Osmaniyeçatak (Marmara)
- Coordinates: 40°01′48″N 28°58′41″E
- Country: Turkey
- Province: Bursa
- District: Orhaneli
- Population (2022): 46
- Time zone: UTC+3 (TRT)

Osmaniyeçatak is a neighbourhood in the municipality and district of Orhaneli, Bursa Province in Turkey. Its population is 46 (2022).
