= Yeşiller, Orhaneli =

Village in Turkey

Yeşiller
- Neighbourhood
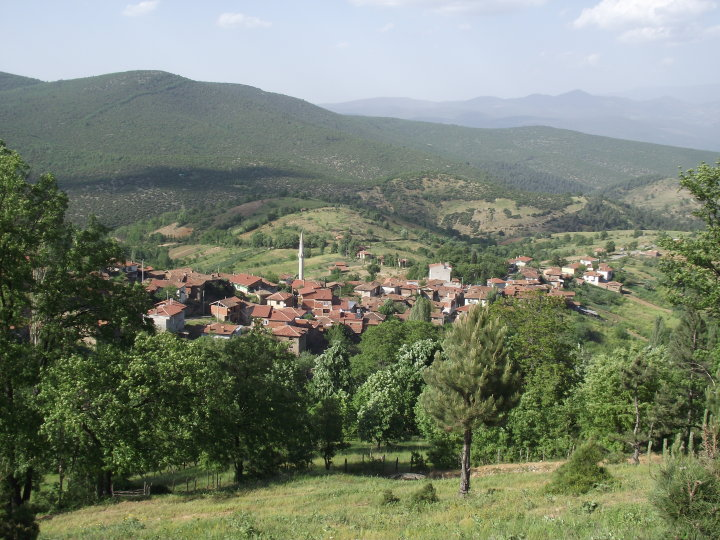

- Location within Turkey Location within Marmara
- Country: Turkey
- Province: Bursa
- District: Orhaneli
- Population (2022): 191
- Time zone: UTC+3 (TRT)

Yeşiller is a neighbourhood in the municipality and district of Orhaneli, Bursa Province in Turkey. Its population is 191 (2022).
