= Gönü, Karacabey =

Village in Turkey

Gönü
- Neighbourhood
- Location in Turkey Gönü (Marmara)
- Coordinates: 40°07′05″N 28°18′34″E
- Country: Turkey
- Province: Bursa
- District: Karacabey
- Population (2022): 366
- Time zone: UTC+3 (TRT)

Gönü is a neighbourhood in the municipality and district of Karacabey, Bursa Province in Turkey. Its population is 366 (2022).
