= Arız, Karacabey =

Village in Turkey

Arız
- Neighbourhood
- Location in Turkey Arız (Marmara)
- Coordinates: 40.2543°N 28.2286°E
- Country: Turkey
- Province: Bursa
- District: Karacabey
- Population (2022): 165
- Time zone: UTC+3 (TRT)

Arız is a neighbourhood in the municipality and district of Karacabey, Bursa Province in Turkey. Its population is 165 (2022).
