= Mustafakemalpaşa =

- District and municipality
- Map showing Mustafakemalpaşa District in Bursa Province

- Location in Turkey Mustafakemalpaşa (Marmara)
- Coordinates: 40°02′07″N 28°24′42″E
- Country: Turkey
- Province: Bursa

Government
  - Mayor: Şükrü Erdem (CHP)
- Area: 1,641 km^{2} (634 sq mi)
- Population (2022): 102,284
  - Density: 62/km^{2} (160/sq mi)
- Time zone: UTC+3 (TRT)
- Postal code: 16500
- Area code: 0224
- Website: www.mustafakemalpasa.bel.tr

Mustafakemalpaşa is a municipality and district of Bursa Province, Turkey. Its area is 1,641 km^{2}, and its population is 102,284 (2022). The Mustafakemalpaşa River (Mustafakemalpaşa Çayı) flows through it.

== History ==
The ancient Greek name of the town was Kremaste (Κρεμαστή in Ancient Greek, Kırmasti in modern Turkish), under the Kingdom of Bithynia. Around 300 AD, the town became important when it became a Christian diocese. In 1336, the town was incorporated into the Ottoman Empire by Orhan. From 1867 until 1922, Kırmasti was part of Hüdavendigâr vilayet. The town was devastated in 1920 during the Greco-Turkish war. After the War of Independence, led by Mustafa Kemal Atatürk, the town council decided to rename the city Mustafakemalpaşa in his honor.

== Composition ==
There are 131 neighbourhoods in Mustafakemalpaşa District:

- Adaköy
- Adalet
- Ağaçlı
- Akarca
- Akçapınar
- Alacaat
- Aliseydi
- Alpagut
- Aralık
- Aşağıbalı
- Atariye
- Atatürk
- Ayaz
- Bahariye
- Barış
- Behramköy
- Boğazköy
- Bostandere
- Bükköy
- Çakallar
- Çaltılıbük
- Camandar
- Çamlıca
- Çardakbelen
- Çavuşköy
- Çeltikçi
- Çırpan
- Çiviliçam
- Çömlekçi
- Çördük
- Cumhuriyet
- Dallıca
- Demirdere
- Demireli
- Dere
- Derecik
- Derekadı
- Devecikonağı
- Doğanalan
- Doğancı
- Döllük
- Dorak
- Durumtay
- Eskibalçık
- Eskikızılelma
- Fevzidede
- Fındıcak
- Garipçetekke
- Güller
- Güllüce
- Gündoğdu
- Güveçdere
- Güvem
- Hacıahmet
- Hacıali
- Hamidiye
- Hamidiyeköyü
- Hamzabey
- Hisaraltı
- İlyasçılar
- İncealipınar
- Işıklar
- Kabulbaba
- Kadirçeşme
- Kapaklıoluk
- Karacalar
- Karaköy
- Karaoğlan
- Karaorman
- Karapınar
- Kayabaşı
- Kazanpınar
- Keltaş
- Kestelek
- Killik
- Kocakoru
- Kömürcükadı
- Körekem
- Kösehoroz
- Kosova
- Koşuboğazı
- Kumkadı
- Kurşunlu
- Lalaşahin
- Lütfiye
- Melik
- Muradiyesarnıç
- Ocaklı
- Ömeraltı
- Onaç
- Orhaniye
- Ormankadı
- Orta
- Osmaniye
- Ovaazatlı
- Paşalar
- Şapçı
- Sarımustafalar
- Şehriman
- Selimiye
- Şerefiye
- Şevketiye
- Şeyhmüftü
- Sincansarnıç
- Soğucak
- Soğukpınar
- Söğütalan
- Sünlük
- Taşköprü
- Taşpınar
- Tatkavaklı
- Tepecik
- Tırnova
- Üçbeyli
- Uğurlupınar
- Vıraca
- Yalıntaş
- Yamanlı
- Yavelli
- Yaylaçayır
- Yenibalçık
- Yenice
- Yenidere
- Yenikızılelma
- Yeşilova
- Yoncaağaç
- Yukarıbalı
- Yumurcaklı
- Yunusemre
- Yüzbaşı Sabribey
- Züferbey

== Sister towns ==
- (Italy) Sciacca
- (North Macedonia) Lipkovo
- (Bosnia and Herzegovina) Mostar
- (Kosovo) Kamenicë
- (Moldova) Copceac
