= List of municipalities in Bursa Province =

This is the List of municipalities in Bursa Province, Turkey as of October 2007.

== Municipalities ==
List is sorted alphabetically A-Z, as Districts->Municipalities.

District	Municipality
Büyükorhan	Büyükorhan
Büyükorhan	Kınık
Gemlik	Gemlik
Gemlik	Kurşunlu
Gemlik	Küçükkumla
Gemlik	Umurbey
Gürsu	Gürsu
Harmancık	Harmancık
İnegöl	Alanyurt
İnegöl	Cerrah
İnegöl	İnegöl
İnegöl	Kurşunlu
İnegöl	Tahtaköprü
İnegöl	Yeniceköy
İznik	Boyalıca
İznik	Elbeyli
İznik	İznik
Karacabey	Karacabey
Keles	Keles
Kestel	Barakfakih
Kestel	Kestel
Mudanya	Güzelyalı
Mudanya	Mudanya
Mudanya	Zeytinbağı
Mustafakemalpaşa	Çeltikçi
Mustafakemalpaşa	Mustafakemalpaşa
Mustafakemalpaşa	Ovaazatlı
Mustafakemalpaşa	Tatkavaklı
Mustafakemalpaşa	Tepecik
Mustafakemalpaşa	Yalıntaş
Mustafakemalpaşa	Yeşilova
Nilüfer	Akçalar
Nilüfer	Çalı
Nilüfer	Gölyazı
Nilüfer	Görükle
Nilüfer	Hasanağa
Nilüfer	Kayapa
Nilüfer	Nilüfer
Orhaneli	Göynükbelen
Orhaneli	Karıncalı
Orhaneli	Orhaneli
Orhangazi	Çakırlı
Orhangazi	Narlıca
Orhangazi	Orhangazi
Orhangazi	Sölöz
Orhangazi	Yeniköy
Orhangazi	Yenisölöz
Osmangazi	Demirtaş
Osmangazi	Emek
Osmangazi	Kirazlı
Osmangazi	Osmangazi
Osmangazi	Ovaakça
Yenişehir	Yenişehir
Yıldırım	Yıldırım

== Changes in 2014 ==
According to Law act no. 6360, belde (town) municipalities within provinces with more than 750,000 population (so called Metropolitan municipalities) were abolished as of 30 March 2014. 21 belde municipalities in the above list are now defunct. The list is kept for historical reference.
