= Hamitabat =

Hamitabat may refer to:

- Hamitabat, İnegöl
- Hamitabat, Söğüt
