= Oylat Cave =

Show cave in Turkey

- Oylat Mağarası
- Location within Turkey
- Location: Hilmiye, İnegöl, Bursa, Turkey
- Coordinates: 39°56′36″N 29°35′26″E
- Length: 730 m (2,400 ft)
- Height variation: 93 m (305 ft)
- Discovery: 2004; 22 years ago
- Show cave opened: 2006; 20 years ago

Oylat Cave (Turkish: Oylat Mağarası) is a show cave in Bursa Province, northwestern Turkey.

== Location and access ==
The cave is located 1 km (0.62 mi) south of Hilmiye village and 17 km (11 mi) southeast of İnegöl town in Bursa Province. It is accessible from İnegöl on the state road to Ankara D.200 E90 southwards, then taking İnegöl-Tavşanlı route D.595 until Gündüzlü village exit, thenafter changing to the provincial road 16-27 at the junction marked "Oylat Thermal Spring Resort" and passing through Hilmiye village.

== Characteristics ==
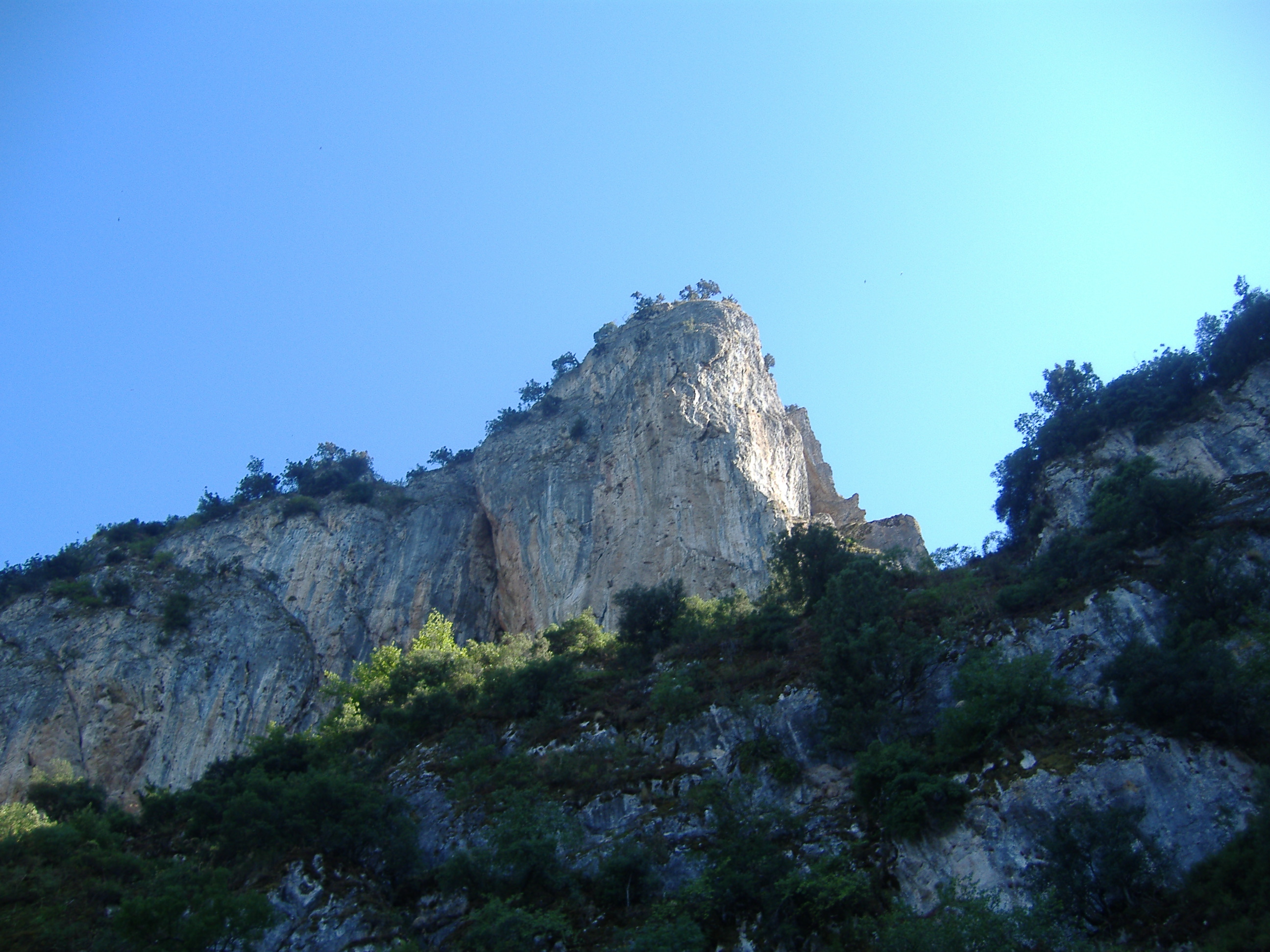
Oylat Mountain surrounding the Oylat Cave.

Oylat Cave was formed on a significant, east-west oriented fault line in the marble formation dating back to around 3 Ma. It is situated at the end of the Oylat Creek Canyon in a terrain of the Pliocene period. Fossils have been found in the cave.

The cave's main entrance is 5–6 m (16–20 ft) above the canyon floor, where at this place the canyon walls rise up 450–500 m (1,480–1,640 ft) high. There exist three more entrances high above the cave's main entrance. The cave has two interconnected levels, and has a meandering shape.

Discovered in 2004, the cave has an overall length of 730 m (2,400 ft) with a 93 m (305 ft) clearance. The stalactites and stalagmites in the cave are colorful. It has a rich natural ecosystem, and is inhabitad by bats, butterflies, worms and guanobites.

A large chamber is reached following a narrow gallery of 2–5 m (6.6–16.4 ft) width and around 15 m (49 ft) height after entry to the first floor cave. The chamber is occupied by dripstone ponds and gravel yards. The cave above is 25–55 m (82–180 ft) wide and 3–15 m (9.8–49.2 ft) high. It is composed of large blocks, pillars, stalactites and stalagmites as well as gravel, sand and clay layers.

The meteorological conditions inside the cave vary according to the location. Narrow galleries and gateways connecting chambers and floors are somewhat windy. At an outside temperature of 29 °C (84 °F) and a humidity of 47%, the temperature falls to 19 °C (66 °F) and the humidity rises to 55% in the cave entrance. In the narrow gallery, the temperature decreases to 17 °C (63 °F) while the humidity goes up to 78%. Finally in the chamber, the temperature is at its lowest value of 14 °C (57 °F) and the humidity reaches 90%.

== Tourism ==
Located in a spa resort, the cave was opened to tourism in 2006. It is believed that the cave is capable of curing respiratory complaints, such as asthma and bronchitis. The cave is visited by domestic and foreign tourists. While domestic tourists come all around the year, foreign tourists, mostly from Kuwait and the United Arab Emirates, visit the cave during the summer season, between June and October.

Only 750 m (2,460 ft) of the cave is open to the public. Visiting the cave takes about 90 minutes.
