= Kayapınar =

Kayapınar is a Turkish word. It may refer to:

== Surname ==
- Abdullah Kayapınar (born 1992), Turkish para powerlifter
- Hamdi Kayapınar (born 1979), Turkish serial killer

== Places ==
- Kayapınar, Balya, a village
- Kayapınar, Biga
- Kayapınar, Diyarbakır, a district and municipality of Diyarbakır Province, Turkey
- Kayapınar, Gercüş, a town in Gercüş district of Batman Province, Turkey
- Kayapınar, İnegöl
- Kayapınar, Taşköprü, a village in Turkey
- Kayapınar, Tavas
- Kayapınar, Tufanbeyli, a village in Tufanbeyli district of Adana Province, Turkey
