= Dömez =

Dömez can refer to:

- Dömez, İnegöl
- Dömez, Söğüt
- Domez (Spain)^{es}, a village in Spain
