= Esenköy =

Esenköy may refer to:

- Koilanemos, a village in Cyprus whose Turkish name is Esenköy
- Esenköy, Çınarcık, a town in Turkey
- Esenköy, İnegöl
- Esenköy, Nazilli, a village in Turkey
- Esenköy, Pınarbaşı, a village in Turkey
- Esenköy, Savaştepe, a village
- Esenköy, Yenipazar, a village in Turkey
- Esenköy, Zonguldak, a village in Turkey
