= Savcı =

Savcı or Savci is the Turkish word for prosecutor. It can refer to the following:

- Savcı Bey, Ottoman prince
- Saru Batu Savcı Bey, brother of Osman I

- Savcı Bey (fictional character), fictional character in Diriliş: Ertuğrul and Kuruluş: Osman, based on Saru Batu Savcı Bey

- Savcıbey, Söğüt, village in Turkey
- Savci, place in Slovenia
- Šavci, village in Serbia
