= Tuzaklı, Söğüt =

Tuzaklı
- Village
- Location within Turkey Location within Marmara
- Coordinates: 40.1173°N 30.2417°E
- Country: Turkey
- Province: Bilecik
- District: Söğüt
- Population (2021): 177
- Time zone: UTC+3 (TRT)

Tuzaklı is a village in the Söğüt District, Bilecik Province, Turkey. Its population is 177 (2021).
