= Sırhoca, Söğüt =

Sırhoca
- Village
- Location within Turkey Location within Marmara
- Coordinates: 40°01′N 30°12′E
- Country: Turkey
- Province: Bilecik
- District: Söğüt
- Population (2021): 46
- Time zone: UTC+3 (TRT)

Sırhoca is a village in the Söğüt District, Bilecik Province, Turkey. Its population is 46 (2021).
