= Dudaş, Söğüt =

Dudaş
- Village
- Location within Turkey Location within Marmara
- Coordinates: 40.0208°N 30.2422°E
- Country: Turkey
- Province: Bilecik
- District: Söğüt
- Population (2021): 63
- Time zone: UTC+3 (TRT)

Dudaş is a village in the Söğüt District, Bilecik Province, Turkey. Its population is 63 (2021).
