= Gülbahçe =

Gülbahçe can refer to:

- Gülbahçe, İnegöl
- Gülbahçe, İzmir
- Gülbahçe, Kemah
