= Bahariye =

Bahariye can refer to:

- Bahariye, İnegöl, a neighbourhood of İnegöl, Bursa Province in Turkey
- Bahariye, Mustafakemalpaşa, a neighbourhood in Mustafakemalpaşa, Bursa, Turkey
- Bahariye (Istanbul Metro), an underground station on the Istanbul Metro
