= Muratbey =

Muratbey can refer to:

- Muratbey, Bartın
- Muratbey, İnegöl
- Muratbey, Kaynaşlı
