= Oluklu, Söğüt =

Oluklu
- Village
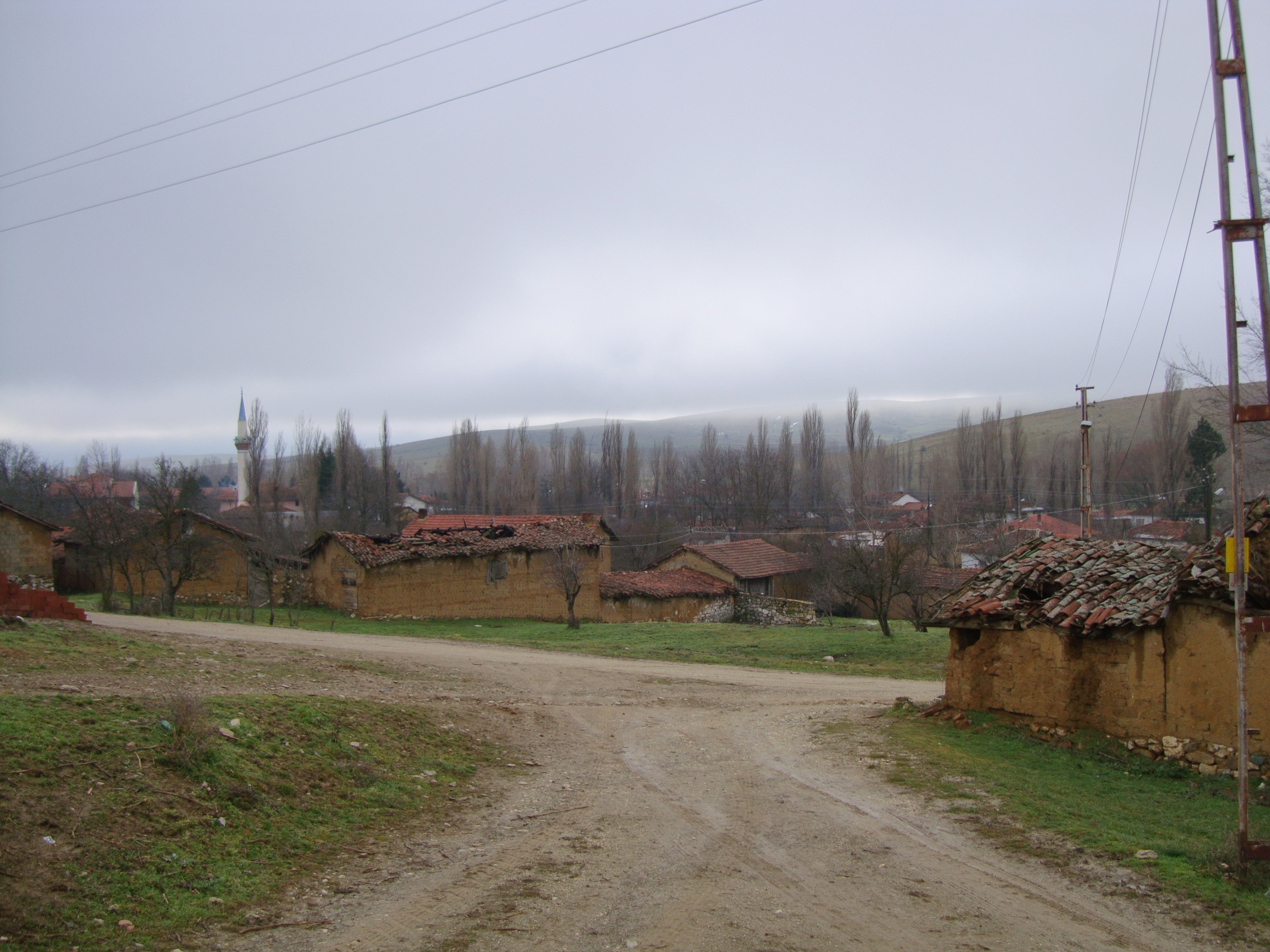

- Location within Turkey Location within Marmara
- Coordinates: 39.9064°N 30.2262°E
- Country: Turkey
- Province: Bilecik
- District: Söğüt
- Population (2021): 269
- Time zone: UTC+3 (TRT)

Oluklu is a village in the Söğüt District, Bilecik Province, Turkey. Its population is 269 (2021).
