= Kayabalı, Söğüt =

Kayabalı
- Village
- Location within Turkey Location within Marmara
- Coordinates: 40.1100°N 30.2921°E
- Country: Turkey
- Province: Bilecik
- District: Söğüt
- Population (2021): 25
- Time zone: UTC+3 (TRT)

Kayabalı is a village in the Söğüt District, Bilecik Province, Turkey. Its population is 25 (2021).
