= Çaltı =

- Village
- Location within Turkey Location within Marmara
- Coordinates: 40°03′N 30°15′E
- Country: Turkey
- Province: Bilecik
- District: Söğüt
- Elevation: 315 m (1,033 ft)
- Population (2021): 1,074
- Time zone: UTC+3 (TRT)
- Postal code: 11600
- Area code: 0228

Çaltı is a village in the Söğüt District, Bilecik Province, Turkey. Its population is 1,074 (2021). It is a few kilometers south of Sakarya River. The distance to Söğüt is 10 kilometres (6.2 mi) and the distance to Bilecik is 38 kilometres (24 mi). The settlement was founded by Yörüks (Nomadic Turkmens). The name of the town refers to a scrubby (Turkish: çalılık) hill at the east of the town. The settlement was declared a town (belde) in 1972. At the 2013 reorganisation, it became a village again.
