= Zemzemiye, Söğüt =

Zemzemiye
- Village
- Location within Turkey Location within Marmara
- Coordinates: 39°52′N 30°16′E
- Country: Turkey
- Province: Bilecik
- District: Söğüt
- Population (2021): 323
- Time zone: UTC+3 (TRT)

Zemzemiye is a village in the Söğüt District, Bilecik Province, Turkey. Its population is 323 (2021).
