= Dipsizgöl =

Dipsizgöl can refer to:

- Dipsizgöl, İnegöl
- Dipsizgöl, Kaynaşlı
