= Gündüzbey, Söğüt =

Gündüzbey
- Village
- Location within Turkey Location within Marmara
- Coordinates: 39.9503°N 30.2282°E
- Country: Turkey
- Province: Bilecik
- District: Söğüt
- Population (2021): 158
- Time zone: UTC+3 (TRT)

Gündüzbey is a village in the Söğüt District, Bilecik Province, Turkey. Its population is 158 (2021).
