= Karakadı =

Karakadı can refer to:

- Karakadı, Cide
- Karakadı, İnegöl
