= İclaliye =

İclaliye can refer to:

- İclaliye, İnegöl
- İclaliye, Susurluk
