= Geçitli, Söğüt =

Geçitli
- Village
- Location within Turkey Location within Marmara
- Coordinates: 40.1286°N 30.1708°E
- Country: Turkey
- Province: Bilecik
- District: Söğüt
- Population (2021): 209
- Time zone: UTC+3 (TRT)

Geçitli is a village in the Söğüt District, Bilecik Province, Turkey. Its population is 209 (2021).
