= Ortaca, Söğüt =

Ortaca
- Village
- Location within Turkey Location within Marmara
- Coordinates: 39.9622°N 30.3336°E
- Country: Turkey
- Province: Bilecik
- District: Söğüt
- Population (2021): 157
- Time zone: UTC+3 (TRT)

Ortaca is a village in the Söğüt District, Bilecik Province, Turkey. Its population is 157 (2021).
