= İhsaniye (disambiguation) =

İhsaniye can refer to:

- İhsaniye
- İhsaniye, Düzce
- İhsaniye, İnegöl
- İhsaniye, İznik
