= Söğüt District =

District of Bilecik Province, Turkey

- District
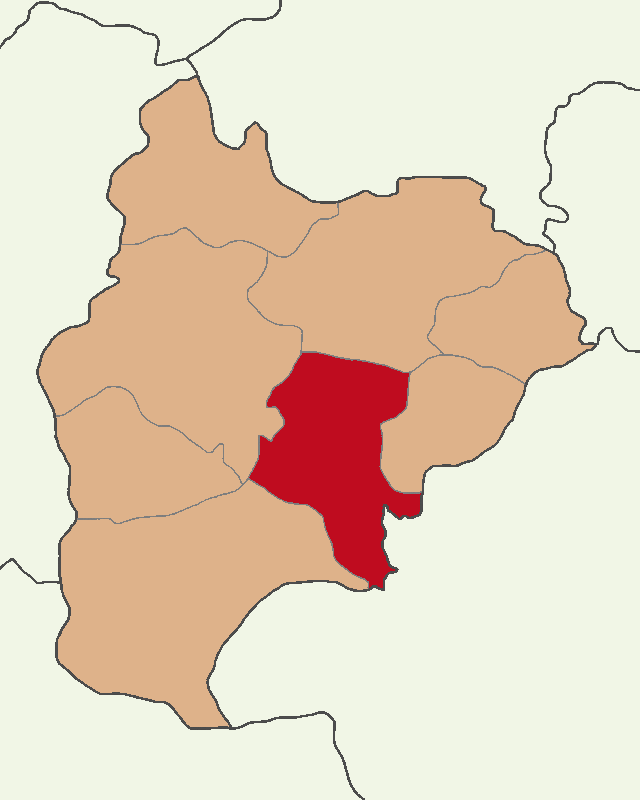
- Map showing Söğüt District in Bilecik Province

- Location in Turkey Söğüt District (Marmara)
- Coordinates: 40°1′N 30°11′E
- Country: Turkey
- Province: Bilecik
- Seat: Söğüt

Government
  - Kaymakam: Ömer Faruk Tuncer
- Area: 523 km^{2} (202 sq mi)
- Population (2021): 18,352
  - Density: 35/km^{2} (91/sq mi)
- Time zone: UTC+3 (TRT)
- Website: www.sogut.gov.tr

Söğüt District is a district of Bilecik Province of Turkey. Its seat is the town Söğüt. Its area is 523 km^{2}, and its population is 18,352 (2021). It is in the Marmara region in the north-west of the country, bordering Bilecik to the west, Gölpazarı to the north, İnhisar to the north-east, Tepebaşı (Eskişehir) to the south-east, and Bozüyük to the south-west.

== Composition ==
There is one municipality in Söğüt District:

- Söğüt

There are 23 villages in Söğüt District:

- Akçasu
- Borcak
- Çaltı
- Dereboyu
- Dömez
- Dudaş
- Geçitli
- Gündüzbey
- Hamitabat
- Hayriye
- Kayabalı
- Kepen
- Kızılsaray
- Küre
- Oluklu
- Ortaca
- Rızapaşa
- Savcıbey
- Sırhoca
- Tuzaklı
- Yakacık
- Yeşilyurt
- Zemzemiye
