= Hayriye, Söğüt =

Hayriye
- Village
- Location within Turkey Location within Marmara
- Coordinates: 39°56′50″N 30°11′20″E
- Country: Turkey
- Province: Bilecik
- District: Söğüt
- Population (2021): 120
- Time zone: UTC+3 (TRT)

Hayriye (also: Hayriyeköy) is a village in the Söğüt District, Bilecik Province, Turkey. Its population is 120 (2021).
