= Akçasu, Söğüt =

Akçasu
- Village
- Location within Turkey Location within Marmara
- Coordinates: 40.0852°N 30.3073°E
- Country: Turkey
- Province: Bilecik
- District: Söğüt
- Population (2021): 128
- Time zone: UTC+3 (TRT)

Akçasu is a village in the Söğüt District, Bilecik Province, Turkey. Its population is 128 (2021).
