= Rızapaşa, Söğüt =

Rızapaşa
- Village
- Location within Turkey Location within Marmara
- Coordinates: 39°55′N 30°14′E
- Country: Turkey
- Province: Bilecik
- District: Söğüt
- Population (2021): 32
- Time zone: UTC+3 (TRT)

Rızapaşa is a village in the Söğüt District, Bilecik Province, Turkey. Its population is 32 (2021).
