= Akbaşlar =

Akbaşlar can refer to:

- Akbaşlar, Dursunbey
- Akbaşlar, İnegöl
