= Hamzabey =

Hamzabey can refer to:

- Hamzabey, Bolu
- Hamzabey, İnegöl
- Hamzabey, Lüleburgaz
- Hamzabey, Yeniçağa
