= Çaylıca =

Çaylıca can refer to:

- Çaylıca, İnegöl
- Çaylıca, Kurşunlu
