= Küre, Bilecik =

Küre
- Village
- Location within Turkey Location within Marmara
- Coordinates: 40°05′N 30°09′E
- Country: Turkey
- Province: Bilecik
- District: Söğüt
- Elevation: 375 m (1,230 ft)
- Population (2021): 953
- Time zone: UTC+3 (TRT)
- Postal code: 11645
- Area code: 0228

Küre is a village in the Söğüt District, Bilecik Province, Turkey. Its population is 953 (2021). Before the 2013 reorganisation, it was a town (belde). It is 12 kilometres (7.5 mi) north of Söğüt and 24 kilometres (15 mi) east of Bilecik. The town was founded in the 13th century. Later Turkmen tribe of Kayı (founders of the Ottoman Empire) also settled in the village. The second sultan (then known as bey) Orhan commissioned a mosque in the town. Another building referring to the history of the town is a türbe ("tomb") which is thought to be of Dursun Fakih, brother in law of Osman I.
