= Borcak, Söğüt =

Borcak
- Village
- Location within Turkey Location within Marmara
- Coordinates: 40.0418°N 30.2125°E
- Country: Turkey
- Province: Bilecik
- District: Söğüt
- Population (2021): 84
- Time zone: UTC+3 (TRT)

Borcak is a village in the Söğüt District, Bilecik Province, Turkey. Its population is 84 (2021).

Isa Sofi in Borcak is an early Ottoman tomb.
