= Kestanealan =

Kestanealan can refer to:

- Kestanealan, Arhavi
- Kestanealan, İnegöl
