= Dereboyu, Söğüt =

Dereboyu
- Village
- Location within Turkey Location within Marmara
- Coordinates: 40.0177°N 30.1512°E
- Country: Turkey
- Province: Bilecik
- District: Söğüt
- Population (2021): 141
- Time zone: UTC+3 (TRT)

Dereboyu is a village that is located in the Söğüt District, Bilecik Province, Turkey. As of 2021, its population was 141.
