= Kızılsaray, Söğüt =

Kızılsaray
- Village
- Location within Turkey Location within Marmara
- Coordinates: 39.9869°N 30.1789°E
- Country: Turkey
- Province: Bilecik
- District: Söğüt
- Population (2021): 67
- Time zone: UTC+3 (TRT)

Kızılsaray is a village in the Söğüt District, Bilecik Province, Turkey. Its population is 67 (2021).
