= Yakacık, Söğüt =

Yakacık
- Village
- Location within Turkey Location within Marmara
- Coordinates: 40.0836°N 30.3160°E
- Country: Turkey
- Province: Bilecik
- District: Söğüt
- Population (2021): 160
- Time zone: UTC+3 (TRT)

Yakacık is a village in the Söğüt District, Bilecik Province, Turkey. Its population is 160 (2021).
