= Küçükyenice =

Küçükyenice is the name of several villages in Turkey:

- Küçükyenice, Gölpazarı
- Küçükyenice, İnegöl
- Küçükyenice, İvrindi
- Küçükyenice, Mudanya
