= Kepen, Söğüt =

Kepen
- Village
- Location within Turkey Location within Marmara
- Coordinates: 39.9853°N 30.1336°E
- Country: Turkey
- Province: Bilecik
- District: Söğüt
- Population (2021): 80
- Time zone: UTC+3 (TRT)

Kepen is a village in the Söğüt District, Bilecik Province, Turkey. Its population is 80 (2021).
