= Yeşilyurt, Söğüt =

Yeşilyurt
- Village
- Location within Turkey Location within Marmara
- Coordinates: 39.9239°N 30.2747°E
- Country: Turkey
- Province: Bilecik
- District: Söğüt
- Population (2021): 145
- Time zone: UTC+3 (TRT)

Yeşilyurt is a village in the Söğüt District, Bilecik Province, Turkey. Its population is 145 (2021).
