= Çeltikçi (disambiguation) =

Çeltikçi is a Turkish place name and may refer to the following places in Turkey:

- Çeltikçi, a district in Burdur Province
- Çeltikçi, Ankara, a town in Kızılcahamam district of Ankara Province
- Çeltikçi, Anamur, a village in Anamur district of Mersin Province
- Çeltikçi, İnegöl, a village in İnegöl district of Bursa Province
- Çeltikçi, Mustafakemalpaşa a village in Mustafakemalpaşa of Bursa Province
