= Babaoğlu, İnegöl =

Village in Turkey

Babaoğlu
- Neighbourhood
- Location in Turkey Babaoğlu (Marmara)
- Coordinates: 40.0657°N 29.7097°E
- Country: Turkey
- Province: Bursa
- District: İnegöl
- Population (2022): 46
- Time zone: UTC+3 (TRT)

Babaoğlu is a neighbourhood in the municipality and district of İnegöl, Bursa Province in Turkey. Its population is 46 (2022).
