= Mustafa Ülgen =

Turkish orthodontist

Mustafa Ülgen (1945-2025 born in İnegöl, Bursa Province) is a Turkish orthodontist.

== Biography ==
Ülgen completed primary and middle school in İnegöl. After his graduation from Bursa Boys High School, he graduated from Istanbul University Faculty of Dentistry in 1967. After two years of military service as a reserve officer, with a scholarship awarded from the Ministry of Education of Turkey, he studied orthodontics at the University of Zurich, Switzerland under Rudolf Hotz and Paul Walter Stöckli, where he got his PhD degree. After his five years education in Zurich followed by ten years of obligatory service, he worked for eight years at Ankara University and for two years in the University of Tigris (Dicle) Diyarbakır.

Ülgen became associate professor in 1979 and full professor in 1985. He was a dean for two years in the University of Tigris (Dicle) Diyarbakır. In 1983, he wrote his first text book, Principles of Orthodontic Treatment, about orthodontic therapy which is still read as the academic study book at Dentistry Faculties all over Turkey for more than 25 years continuously. In 1985 and 1986 with a scholarship provided from "Alexander von Humboldt Foundation", he made two researches in the University of Bonn which were later published in a German orthodontic journal. Then he also worked for six years at Istanbul University and for two years at Yeditepe University. In 2000, he wrote his second text book on orthodontic diagnosis, Orthodontics (Anomalies, Cephalometrics, Etiology, Growth and Development, Diagnosis). In 2002 he got retired with his own will. In 2006, he published his memoirs, Mustafa son of Mustafa.

Ülgen has published two text books (that are also e-books available free of charge online – please also find the links below on the e-books section), sixty-eight articles, fourteen which are printed in foreign journals. He hold thirty papers in different congresses. He gave thirty-nine conferences, including fourteen in foreign countries. He is married since 1968, has a daughter, a son and two grandchildren.

== Publications ==
=== Publications In Turkish ===
==== Videos ====
1. Ülgen, M.: Orthodontic Treatment Without Aperature Part 1, YouTube, 2012.
  Ülgen, M.: Apareysiz Ortodontik Tedavi Bölüm 1, YouTube, 2012. Video on YouTube
2. Ülgen, M.: Orthodontic Treatment Without Aperature Part 2, YouTube, 2012.
  Ülgen, M.: Apareysiz Ortodontik Tedavi Bölüm 2, YouTube, 2012. Video on YouTube

==== E-Books ====
1. Ülgen, M.: Principles of Orthodontic Treatment, 544 pages, Seventh Edition, Ankara University Press, Ankara, 2005.
  Ülgen, M.: Ortodontik Tedavi Prensipleri, 544 Sayfa, Yedinci Baskı, Ankara Üniversitesi Basımevi, Ankara, 2005.
2. Ülgen, M.: Orthodontics (Anomalies, Cephalometrics, Etiology, Growth and Development, Diagnosis), 405 pages, Second Edition, Ankara University Press, Ankara, 2001.
  Ülgen, M.: Ortodonti (Anamoliler, Sefâmoliler, Etioloji, Büyüme ve Gelişim, Tanı), 405 Sayfa, İkinci Baskı, Ankara Üniversitesi Basımevi, Ankara, 2001.
3. Ülgen, M.: Mustafa Oğlu Mustafa, 330 pages, First Edition, Vatan Kitap, Istanbul, 2006.
  Ülgen, M.: Mustafa Oğlu Mustafa, 330 pages, First Edition, Vatan Kitap, Istanbul, 2006.

==== Journals and other publications ====
1. Ülgen, M.: Orthodontic Model Analysis, Ankara University Faculty of Dentistry Journal, Volume 4, Number 1: 115–124, 1977.
  Ülgen, M.: Ortodontik Model Analizi, Ankara Ü. Dişhek. Fak. Dergisi, Cilt 4, Sayı1: 115–124, 1977.
2. Ülgen, M. : Cervical (Kloehn) Headgear and Effect Mechanism, Istanbul University Faculty of Dentistry Journal, Volume 11, Number 2: 123–129, 1977.
  Ülgen, M. : Servikal (Kloehn) Headgear ve Tesir Mekanizması, İstanbul Ü. Dişhek. Fak. Dergisi, Cilt 11, Sayı 2: 123–129, 1977.
3. Ülgen, M. : Clinical Periodontology-in Orthodontics cooperation, Journal of Periodontology, Volume 2, Issue 1: 19–23, 1977.
  Ülgen, M. : Klinikte Periodontoloji- Ortodonti İşbirligi, Periodontoloji Dergisi, Cilt 2, Sayı 1: 19–23, 1977.
4. Ülgen, M.: Combined Effect of External Force, Lip Force and Class III Elastics, Aegean University Faculty of Dentistry Journal, Volume 2, Issue 4: 589–597, 1977.
  Ülgen, M.: Ağız Dışı Kuvvet, Dudak Kuvveti ve Çenelerarası K1. III Elastik Kuvvetlerinin Birleştirilmesi, Ege Ü. Dişhek. Fak. Dergisi, Cilt 2, Sayı 4: 589–597, 1977.
5. Ülgen, M. : Presurgical and Preprosthetical Orthodontics (a case Presentation), Ankara University Faculty of Dentistry Journal, Volume 4, Issue 1: 63–70, 1977.
  Ülgen, M. : Cerrahi ve Protez Öncesi Ortodonti (Bir Vaka Takdimi) Ankara Ü. Dişhek. Fak. Dergisi, Cilt 4, Sayı 1: 63–70, 1977.
6. Ülgen, M. : Expansion of Sutura Palatina Mediana, Istanbul University Faculty of Dentistry Journal, Volume 11, Number 3: 180–185, 1977.
  Ülgen, M. : Sutura Palatina Mediana'nın Genişletilmesi, İstanbul Üniversitesi Dişhekimliği Fakültesi Dergisi, Cilt 11, Sayı 3: 180–185, 1977.
7. Ülgen, M.: Lip Gymnastics and Histology, Development and Physiology of the Striated Muscles, Ankara University Faculty of Dentistry Journal, Volume 5, Number 1-2-3: 75–85, 1978.
  Ülgen, M.: Dudak Jimnastiği ve Çizgili Kasların Histolojisi, Gelişim ve Fizyolojisi, Ankara Ü. Dişhek. Fak. Dergisi, Cilt 5, Sayı 1-2-3: 75–85, 1978.
8. Ülgen, M.: The Cases where The Space of the Missing Teeth can be Orthodontically Closed or Not, Istanbul University Faculty of Dentistry Journal, Volume 12, Number 1: 17–26, 1978.
  Ülgen, M.: Diş, Kavislerinin Diş Eksikliklerine Bağlı Boşluklarının Ortodontik Olarak Kapatılabileceği ve Kapatılmaması Gerektiği Vakalar, İstanbul Ü. Dişhek. Fak. Dergisi, Cilt 12, Sayı 1: 17–26, 1978.
9. Ülgen, M.: Measurement Error of the Cephalometric X-Ray, Ankara University Faculty of Dentistry Journal, Volume 6, Number 1-2: 17–23, 1979.
  Ülgen, M.: Uzak Röntgen Resimlerinin Değerlendirilmelerinde Ölçüm Hataları, Ankara Ü. Dişhek. Fak. Dergisi, Cilt 6, Sayı 1-2: 17–23, 1979.
10. Ülgen, M.: Investigation of the Cervical Headgear Treatment Effects on the Dentofacial Skeleton of the Angle Class II Division 1 Cases, Aegean University Faculty of Dentistry Journal, Volume 4, Number 3-4: 73–85, 1979.
  Ülgen, M.: Angle KL.II,1 Anomalilerde Servikal Headgear (Servikal Ağız Dışı Kuvvet) Tedavisinin Diş-Çene- Yüz İskeletine Etkilerinin Sefalometrik Olarak İncelenmesi, Ege Ü. Dişhek. Fak. Dergisi, Cilt 4, Sayı 3-4: 73–85, 1979.
11. Ülgen, M.: Investigation of the Activator Treatment Effects on the Dentofacial Skeleton of the Angle Class II Division 1 Cases, Ankara University Faculty of Dentistry Journal, Volume 7, Issue 1: 27–38, 1980.
  Ülgen, M.: Angle K1. II,1 Anomalilerinde Aktivatör Tedavisinin Diş - Çene- Yüz İskeletine Etkilerinin Sefalometrik Olarak incelenmesi, Ankara Ü. Dişhek. Fak. Dergisi, Cilt 7, Sayı 1: 27–38, 1980.
12. Ülgen, M.: Application of the Reverse Headgear for the Treatment of the Angle Class III Cases, Ankara University Faculty of Dentistry Journal, Volume 7, Number 2: 77–83, 1980.
  Ülgen, M.: KL. III Anomalilerin Tedavisinde Arkadan- Öne Doğru Ağız Dışı Kuvvet Uygulanması (Reverse Headgear) Ankara Ü. Dişhek. Fak. Dergisi, Cilt 7, Sayı 2: 77–83, 1980.
13. Ülgen, M.: Prof.. Dr. med. Rudolf Hotz, and Serial Extraction in Orthodontics, Ankara University Faculty of Dentistry Journal, Volume 7, issue 2: 93–98, 1980.
  Ülgen, M.: Prof. Dr. med. Rudolf Hotz ve Ortodontide Seri Çekim, Ankara Ü. Dişhek. Fak. Dergisi, Cilt 7, Sayı 2 : 93–98, 1980.
14. Ülgen, M.: Comparison of the Activator and Cervical Headgear Treatment Effects on the Dentofacial Skeleton of the Angle Class II Division 1 Cases, Hacettepe University Faculty of Dentistry Journal, Volume 4, Number 1-4: 42–54, 1980.
  Ülgen, M.: Angle K1.II,1 Anomalilerinde Aktivatör ve Servikal Headgear I (Servikal Ağız Dışı Kuvvet) Tedavisinin Diş-Çene-Yüz İskeletine Etkilerinin Karşılaştırılması, Hacettepe Ü. Dişhek. Fak. Dergisi, Cilt 4, Sayı 1-4: 42–54, 1980.
15. Ülgen, M.: Complication and Treatment of the Impacted Upper Canines, Ankara University Faculty of Dentistry Journal, Volume 7, Number 3: 175–182, 1980.
  Ülgen, M.: İndifa Edememiş Üst Kaninler, Komplikasyonu ve Ortodontik Tedavisi, Ankara Ü. Dişhek. Fak. Dergisi, Cilt 7, Sayı 3: 175–182, 1980.
16. Ülgen, M.: Adult Preprosthetic Orthodontic Treatment, Ankara University Faculty of Dentistry Journal, Volume 8, Number 2-3: 175–182, 1980.
  Ülgen, M.: Erişkinde Protez Öncesi Ortodontik Tedavi, Ankara Ü. Dişhek. Fak. Dergisi, Cilt 8, Sayı 2-3: 145–155, 1981.
17. Ülgen, M.: Morphology, Treatment and Torque Mechanics of the Angle Class II Division 2 Cases, Ankara University Faculty of Dentistry Journal, Volume 8, Number 2-3: 157–170, 1981.
  Ülgen, M.: K1. II,2 Morfoloji, Tedavi ve Torque Mekaniği, A.Ü. Dişhek. Fak. Dergisi, Cilt 8, Sayı 2-3: 157–170, 1981.
18. Ülgen, M.: Activator and Headgear Combination Treatment of the Angle Class II Division 1 Cases and Trimming of the Activator Acrylic, Istanbul University Faculty of Dentistry Journal, Volume 15, Number 2: 101–110, 1981.
  Ülgen, M.: Angle K1. II, 1 Anomalilerin, Aktivatör-Headgear Kombinasyonu ile Tedavisi ve Aktivatörün Möllenmesine göre Reaksiyonları, İstanbul Ü. Dişhek. Fak. Dergisi, Cilt 15, Sayı 2: 101–110, 1981.
19. Ülgen, M. and İşcan, HN: Total Luxation of the Upper Central Incisor and Orthodontic Treatment, Ankara University Faculty of Dentistry Journal, Volume 7, Number 3: 183–189, 1981.
  Ülgen, M. ve İşcan, H.N.: Üst Orta Kesici Diş Total Lüksasyonu ve Ortodontik Tedavisi, Ankara Ü. Dişhek. Fak. Dergisi, Cilt 7, Sayı 3: 183–189, 1981.
20. Ülgen, M. and Altug, Z. : Distal Driving of the Canines with the Sectional Arches, Ankara University Faculty of Dentistry Journal, Volume 8, Number 2-3: 183–193, 1981.
  Ülgen, M. ve Altuğ, Z. : Kanin Distalizasyonunda Bölümlü Vestibül Arklar, Ankara Ü. Dişhek. Fak. Dergisi, Cilt 8, Sayı 2-3: 183–193, 1981.
21. Ülgen, M.: The Philosophy, Physiology and Histology of the Functional Jaw Orthopedics, Ankara University Faculty of Dentistry Journal, Volume 9, Issue 2: 53–67, 1982.
  Ülgen, M.: Fonksiyonel Çene Ortopedisi Felsefesi, Fizyolojisi ve Histolojisi, Ankara Ü. Dişhek. Fak. Dergisi, Cilt 9, Sayı 2: 53–67, 1982.
22. Ülgen, M., İşcan, H.N. and Altug, Z. : Tracing and Measurement Errors of the Cephalometric Roentgenograms (I): The Differences Between First and Second Tracings and Measurements of the Same Investigators, Ankara University Faculty of Dentistry Journal, Volume 9, Issue 1: 37–49, 1982.
  Ülgen, M., İşcan, H.N. ve Altuğ, Z. : Sefalometride Çizim ve Ölçüm Hataları (I); Aynı Bireylerin Belirli Zaman Aralıklarıyla Birbirinden Bağımsız Olarak Tekrarladıkları Çizim ve Ölçümleri Arasındaki Bireysel Farklılıklar, A.Ü. Dişhek. Fak. Dergisi, Cilt 9, Sayı 1: 37–49, 1982.
23. Ülgen, M., Altug, Z. and İşcan, H.N. : Tracing and Measurement Errors of the Cephalometric Roentgenograms (II): The Differences Between Three Investigators, Ankara University Faculty of Dentistry Journal, Volume 9, Issue 1: 77–89, 1982.
  Ülgen, M., Altuğ, Z. ve İşcan, H.N. : Sefalometride Çizim ve Ölçüm Hataları (II), Aynı Uzak Röntgen Resimlerinin Üç Araştırıcı Tarafından Yapılan Sefalometrik Ölçümleri Arasındaki Araştırıcılar Arasındaki Farklılıklar, Ankara Ü. Dişhek. Fak. Dergisi, Cilt 9, Sayı 1: 77–89, 1982.
24. Ülgen, M.: The Influence of the Headgear Therapy on the Maxillofacial Sutures, Ankara University Faculty of Dentistry Journal, Volume 10, Issue 1: 277–282, 1983.
  Ülgen, M.: Ağız Dışı Kuvvet (Headgear) Etkisiyle Maksillo- Fasiyal Suturalarda Oluşan Degişiklikler, Ankara Ü. Dişhek. Fak. Dergisi, Cilt 10, Sayı 1: 277–282, 1983.
25. Ülgen, M.: Principles of Orthodontic Treatment, 544 pages, First Edition, Ankara University Press, Ankara, 1983.
  Ülgen, M.: Ortodontik Tedavi Prensipleri, 544 Sayfa, Birinci Baskı, Ankara Üniversitesi Basımevi, Ankara, 1983.
26. Ülgen, M.: Direct Bonding of the Brackets, Ankara University Faculty of Dentistry Journal, Volume 10, Issue 1: 283–295, 1983.
  Ülgen, M.: Braket'lerin Doğrudan Doğruya Dişler Üzerine Yapıştırılması (Direct Bonding), Ankara Ü. Dişhek. Fak. Dergisi, Cilt 10, Sayı 1: 283–295, 1983.
27. Ülgen, M. and Bekbölet, N.: Change of the Occlusal Plane Inclination through Orthodontic Treatment, Ankara University Faculty of Dentistry Journal, Volume 10, Number 1: 69–79, 1983.
  Ülgen, M. ve Bekbölet, N.: Ortodontik Tedavi Sonucu Oklüzal Düzlem Eğiminde Oluşan Değişiklikler, Ankara Ü. Dişhek. Fak. Dergisi, Cilt 10, Sayı 1: 69–79, 1983.
28. Ülgen, M. : Morphology of The Dentofacial Skeleton of the Non Anomalous Hyperdivergent and Hypodivergent Cases, Ankara University Faculty of Dentistry Journal, Volume 10, Number 1: 81–102, 1983.
  Ülgen, M. : Yüzün Dik Yön Boyutlarının Azalmış (Hypodivergent) veya Artmış, (Hyperdivergent) Olmasına Rağmen Ortodontik Anomalilerin Ortaya Çıkmadığı Vakalarda Yüz İskeleti Morfolojisi, Ankara Ü. Dişhek. Fak. Dergisi, Cilt 10, Sayı 1: 81–102, 1983.
29. Ülgen, M. and İşcan, HN: The Relationship Between the Overbite and Depth of the Curve of Spee, Ankara University Faculty of Dentistry Journal, Volume 10, Number 2-3: 33–40,1983.
  Ülgen, M. ve İşcan, H.N.: Ortodontik Anomalilerde Overbite ile Spee Eğrisi Derinliği Arasındaki İlişki, Ankara Ü. Dişhek. Fak. Dergisi, Cilt 10, Sayı 2-3: 33–40,1983.
30. Ülgen, M. and Altug, Z.: Comparison of Spontan Changes and Changes through Edgewise Treatment of Increased Overbite, Ankara University Faculty of Dentistry Journal, Volume 10, Number 2-3: 55–64, 1983.
  Ülgen, M. ve Altuğ, Z.: Artmış Overbite'lı Olgulardaki Egdewise Teknikle Tedaviye Bağlı Değişikliklerle Spontan Değişiklikler Arasında Farkların Araştırılması, Ankara Ü. Dişhek. Fak. Dergisi, Cilt 10, Sayı 2-3: 55–64, 1983.
31. Ülgen, M.: Orthodontic Model Investigation of the Changes during Orthodontic Treatment and After Treatment (Residiv), Ankara University Faculty of Dentistry Journal, Volume 10, Number 2-3: 85–99, 1983.
  Ülgen, M.: Ortodontik Tedaviyle Oluşan Değişiklikler ve Tedaviden Sonra Görülen Nüksün (Residiv) Ortodontik Modeller Üzerinde Araştırılması, A.Ü. Dişhek. Fak. Dergisi, Cilt 10, Sayı 2-3: 85–99, 1983.
32. Ülgen, M.: Cephalometric Investigation of the Changes during Orthodontic Treatment and After Treatment (Residiv), Ankara University Faculty of Dentistry Journal, Volume 11, Issue 1: 135–152, 1984.
  Ülgen, M.: Ortodontik Tedaviyle Oluşan Değişiklikler ve Tedaviden Sonra Görülen Nüksün (Residiv) Profil Sefalometrik Röntgenleri Üzerinde Araştırılması, A.Ü. Dişhek. Fak. Dergisi, Cilt 11, Sayı 1: 135–152, 1984.
33. Ülgen, M., Altug, Z. and İşcan, H.N.: The Effects and Differences of "Monobloc + Cervical Headgear" and "Monobloc + Occipital Headgear" Combination Therapy of Angle Class II Division 1 Cases, Ankara University Faculty of Dentistry Journal, Volume 11, Issue 1: 161–175, 1984.
  Ülgen, M., Altuğ, Z. ve İşcan, H.N.: K1. II,1 Anomalilerin "Monoblok + Servikal Headgear" ve "Monoblok + Oksipital Headgear" Kombinasyonu Tedavisiyle Meydana Gelen Değişiklikler ve İki Tedavi Metodu Arasındaki Farkların İncelenmesi, A.Ü. Dişhek. Fak. Dergisi, Cilt 11, Sayı 1: 161–175, 1984.
34. Ülgen, M.: Corrections Between Overbite and Dentoskeletal Factors, Ankara University Faculty of Dentistry Journal, Volume 11, Number 2-3: 1–23, 1984.
  Ülgen, M.: Overbite ile Dişsel ve İskeletsel Faktörler Arasındaki İlişkiler (Korelasyonlar), Ankara Ü. Dişhek. Fak. Dergisi, Cilt 11, Sayı 2-3: 1–23, 1984.
35. Ülgen, M., and Altug, Z.: Cephalometric Investigation of the Extraction Therapy in Upper and Lower Jaw with the Edgewise Technique, Ankara University Faculty of Dentistry Journal, Volume 13, Number 1-2-3: 61–72, 1986.
  Ülgen, M., ve Altuğ, Z.: Çekim Yapılarak Edgewise Teknik ile Tedavi Edilen Vakalarda Oluşan Değişikliklerin Sefalometrik Olarak Araştırılması (Alt Keser Kontrolu). Ankara Ü. Dişhek. Fak. Dergisi, Cilt 13, Sayı 1-2-3: 61–72, 1986.
36. Ülgen, M.: Principles of Orthodontic Treatment, 544 pages, Second Edition, Tigris (Dicle) University Press, Ankara, 1986.
  Ülgen, M.: Ortodontik Tedavi Prensipleri, 544 Sayfa, İkinci Baskı, Dicle Üniversitesi Basımevi, Diyarbakır, 1986.
37. Ülgen, M.: Soft Tissue Profile Changes After Extraction and Non-Extraction Therapy of the Angle Class II Division 1 Cases, Ankara University Faculty of Dentistry Journal, Volume 13, Issue 1-2-3 -: 159–166, 1986.
  Ülgen, M.: Angle K1. II,1 Anomalilerin Çekimli ve Çekimsiz Tedavileri Sonucu Oluşan Yumuşak Doku Profil Değişiklikleri, A.Ü. Dişhek. Fak. Dergisi, Cilt 13, Sayı 1-2-3-: 159–166, 1986.
38. Ülgen, M. : Lingual Technique, Turkish Oral Journal, Volume 3, Number 32: 6–8, December 1986.
  Ülgen, M. : Lingual Teknik, Oral Dergisi, Cilt 3, Say 32: 6–8, Aralık 1986.
39. Ülgen, M., and Yolalan, C.: Evaluation of Angle Class II Division 1 Malocclusions with Coben Cephalometric Analysis, Gazi University Faculty of Dentistry Journal, Volume 4, Number 2: 23–34, 1987.
  Ülgen, M., ve Yolalan, C.: Angle K1. II, 1 Anomalilerin Coben Sefalometrik Analizi ile İncelenmesi, Gazi Ü. Dişhek. Fak. Derg., Cilt 4, Say 2: 23–34, 1987.
40. Ülgen, M., and Yolalan, C.: Evaluation of Angle Class III Malocclusions with Coben Cephalometric Analysis, Turkish Journal of Orthodontics, Volume 1, Number 1: 1–6, 1988.
  Ülgen, M., ve Yolalan, C.: Angle K1. III Anomalilerin Coben Sefalometrik Analizi ile İncelenmesi, Türk Ortodonti Dergisi, Cilt 1, Sayı 1: 1–6, 1988.
41. Ülgen, M., and Gögen, H.: Effect on the B-point of Cervical Headger Therapy of Angle Class II Division ! Malocclusions, Turkish Journal of Orthodontics, Volume 2, Number 2: 281–286, 1989.
  Ülgen, M., ve Gögen, H.: Angle K1. II,1 Anomalilerinde Servikal Headgear Tedavisinin B Noktasına Olan Etkisi, Türk Ortodonti Dergisi, Cilt 2, Say 2: 281–286, 1989.
42. Ülgen, M., İşcan, H.N. and Gögen, H.: Changes of Mandibular Morphology After Cervical Headgear Treatment of Angle Class II Division 1 Malocclusions, Turkish Journal of Orthodontics, Volume 3, Number 2: 71–78, 1990.
  Ülgen, M., İşcan, H.N. ve Gögen, H.: K1. II,1 Vakalarının Servikal Headgear ile Tedavisinde Alt Çene Morfolojisinde Oluşan Değişiklikler, Türk Ortodonti Dergisi, Cilt 3, Sayı 2: 71–78, 1990.
43. Ülgen, M.: Principles of Orthodontic Treatment, 544 pages, Third Edition, Ankara University Press, Ankara, 1990.
  Ülgen, M.: Ortodontik Tedavi Prensipleri, 544 Sayfa, Üçüncü Baskı, Ankara Üniversitesi Basımevi, Ankara, 1990.
44. Erbay, E., and Ülgen, M.: Soft Tissue Profile Changes Through Fränkel's Function Regulator (FR-4) Therapy and Lip Gymnastics of the Angle Class I Malocclusions with Skeletal Open Bite, Turkish Journal of Orthodontics, Volume 6, Number 1: 20–28, 1993.
  Erbay, E., ve Ülgen, M.: İskeletsel Ön Açık Kapanış Gösteren Angle I.Sınıf Anomalilerin Frankel'in Fonksiyon Düzenleyici FR-4 Aygıtı ve Dudak Kapatma Alıştırmaları ile Tedavisinin Yumuşak Doku Profili Üzerindeki Etkilerinin Sefalometrik Olarak İncelenmesi. Türk Ortodonti Dergisi, Cilt 6, Sayı 1: 20–28, 1993.
45. Ülgen, M.: Principles of Orthodontic Treatment, 544 pages, Fourth Edition, Publication of Istanbul University Faculty of Dentistry, Dilek Örünç Printing Office, Istanbul, 1993.
  Ülgen, M.: Ortodontik Tedavi Prensipleri, Dördüncü Baskı, İstanbul Üniversitesi Dişhekimligi Fakültesi Yayını, Dilek Örünç Matbaası, İstanbu, 1993.
46. Ülgen, M. and Dalaman, D.: Non-Surgical Orthodontic Treatment of A Skeletal Prognathia Inferior Case which is Beyond the Borders of Orthodontics, Turkish Journal of Orthodontics, Volume 7, Issue 2: 220–226, 1994.
  Ülgen, M. ve Dalaman, D.: Ortodonti Sınırlarını Aşan Bir Prognati İnferior Olgusunun Ameliyatsız Ortodontik Tedavisi. Türk Ortodonti Dergisi, Cilt 7, Sayı 2: 220–226, 1994.
47. Ertan A. and Ülgen, M.: Transposition of the Upper Canine (A case Presentation), Turkish Journal of Orthodontics, Volume 8 Issue 2: 303–310, 1995.
  Ertan A. ve Ülgen, M.: Üst Kanin Transpozisyonu (Bir Vaka Takdimi) Türk Ortodonti Dergisi, Cilt 8 Sayı 2: 303–310, 1995.
48. Erbay, E., Dalaman Guner, D., and Ülgen, M.: Methodical Error Investigation of the Orthodontic Model Analysis done on the Mixed Dentition Period, Turkish Pededontic Journal, Volume 2, Issue 1: 50–57, 1995.
  Erbay, E., Dalaman Güner, D., ve Ülgen, M.: Karışık Dişlenme Döneminde Yapılan Ortodontik Model Analizinde Metod Hatasının İncelenmesi. Pedodonti Dergisi, Cilt 2,Sayı 1: 50–57, 1995.
49. Erbay, E., and Ülgen, M.: Profile Changes of the Angle Class I Malocclusions Treated with and without Extraction, Turkish Journal of Orthodontics, Volume 8, Number 2: 231–241, 1995.
  Erbay, E., ve Ülgen, M.: Çekimli ve Çekimsiz Olarak Tedavi Edilen Angle I. Sınıf Anomalilerde Profil Değişikliklerinin İncelenmesi. Türk Ortodonti Dergisi, Cilt 8,Sayı 2: 231–241, 1995.
50. Bekbölet, N., Ülgen, M., and Fıratlı, S.: Change of the Occlusal Plane Inclination Through Growth and Development, Turkish Journal of Orthodontics, Volume 8, Number 2: 194–201, 1995.
  Bekbölet, N., Ülgen, M., ve Fıratlı, S.: Gelişimle Oklüzal Düzlem Eğiminde Meydana Gelen Değişiklikler. Türk Ortodonti Dergisi, Cilt 8, Sayı 2: 194–201, 1995.
51. Fıratlı, S., and Ülgen M.: Soft Tissue Profile Changes Through Fränkel's Function Regulator (FR-3) Therapy of the Angle Class III Malocclusions, Turkish Journal of Orthodontics, Volume 8, Number 2: 187–193, 1995.
  Fıratlı, S., ve Ülgen M.: Fränkel'in Fonksiyon, Düzenleyicisi FR-3'ün K1. III Vakalarda Yumuşak Doku Profilinde Meydana Getirdiği Değişikliklerin Sefalometrik Olarak İncelenmesi. Türk Ortodonti Dergisi, Cilt 8, Sayı 2: 187–193, 1995.
52. Fıratlı, S., and Ülgen M.: The Effects of Cervical Headgear on the Cervical Vertebra, Turkish Journal of Orthodontics, Volume 8, Number 2: 214–224, 1995.
  Fıratlı, S., ve Ülgen M.: Servikal Headgear'in Boyun Omurlarına Etkisi. Türk Ortodonti Dergisi, Cilt 8, Sayı 2: 214–224, 1995.
53. Ülgen, M.: Orthodontics (Anomalies, Cephalometrics, Etiology, Growth and Development, Diagnosis), 405 pages, First Edition, Yeditepe University Publication, Number 2 Istanbul, 2000.
  Ülgen, M.: Ortodonti (Anamoliler, Sefalometri, Etioloji, Büyüme ve Gelişim, Tanı), 405 Sayfa, Birinci Baskı, Yeditepe Üniversitesi Yayınları, Sayı: 2, İstanbul, 2000.
54. Ülgen, M., Karadede, I., Kaya, H., and Baran, S.: The influence of Calcium Malnutrition on the Craniofacial Growth and Development in Rats, Turkish Journal of Orthodontics, Volume 14, Number 1: 1–15, 2001
  Ülgen, M., Karadede, I., Kaya, H., ve Baran, S.; Sıçanlarda Kalsiyum Malnutrisyonunun Kraniyofasiyal Büyüme ve Gelişim Üzerine Etkisi, Türk Ortodonti Dergisi, Cilt 14, Sayı 1: 1–15, 2001.
55. Ülgen, M., Karadede, I., Kaya, H., and Baran, S.: The influence of Protein Malnutrition on the Craniofacial Growth and Development in Rats, Turkish Journal of Orthodontics, Volume 14, Number 1: 16–30, 2001.
  Ülgen, M., Kaya, H., Karadede, I. ve Baran, S., Sıçanlarda Protein Malnutrisyonunun Çene-Yüz İskeletinin Büyüme ve Gelişimine Etkisi, Türk Ortodonti Dergisi, Cilt 14,Sayı 1: 16–30, 2001.
56. Ülgen, M.: Orthodontics (Anomalies, Cephalometrics, Etiology, Growth and Development, Diagnosis), 405 pages, Second Edition, Ankara University Press, Ankara, 2001.
  Ülgen, M.: Ortodonti (Anamoliler, Sefâmoliler, Etioloji, Büyüme ve Gelişim, Tanı), 405 Sayfa, İkinci Baskı, Ankara Üniversitesi Basımevi, Ankara, 2001.
57. Ülgen, M.: Principles of Orthodontic Treatment, 544 pages, Seventh Edition, Ankara University Press, Ankara, 2005.
  Ülgen, M.: Ortodontik Tedavi Prensipleri, 544 Sayfa, Yedinci Baskı, Ankara Üniversitesi Basımevi, Ankara, 2005.

=== Journals In German ===
1. Ülgen, M.: Investigation of the Activator Treatment and Cervical Headgear Treatment Effects on the Dentofacial Skeleton of the Angle Class II Division 1 Malocclusion and Comparison of these Methods, German Journal of Progress in Jaw Orthopedics, Volume 42: 337–348, 1981.
  Ülgen, M.: Kephalometrische Untersuchung der Auswirkungen der Distalbissbehandlung mit dem Aktivator und dem Zervikalheadgear auf das Gesichtsskelett und deren Verleich, Fortschr. Kieferorthop. 42: 337–348, 1981.
2. Ülgen, M.:Cephalometric Investigation of the Non-Anomalous Hyperdivergent and Hypodivergent Cases, German Journal of Progress in Jaw Orthopedics, Volume 45: 348–459, 1984.
  Ülgen, M.: Kephalometrische Untersuchung der keine Anomalie zeigenden, gut kompensierten hyper und hypodivergierenden Faelle, Fortschr. Kieferorthop., 45: 348–359, 1984.
3. Ülgen, M.: Residiv During and After the Retention Phase, German Journal of Progress in Jaw Orthopedics, Volume 45: 475–448, 1984.
  Ülgen, M.: Rezidive waehrend und nach der Retention, Fortschr. Kieferorthop. 45: 475–488, 1984.
4. Ülgen, M.: Correlations Between Overbite and Dentoskeletal Factors, GErman Journal of Progress in Jaw Orthopedics, Volume46: 369–382, 1985.
  Ülgen, M.: Overbite- Korrelationen zwischen dentalen und skelettalen Faktoren des Gesichtsschaedels, Fortschr. Kieferorthop. 46: 369–382, 1985.
5. Ülgen, M. and Schmuth, G.P.F. : Effects of Activator Therapy on the Angle Class II Division 1 Malocclusions, German Journal of Progress in Jaw Orthopedics, Volume 48: 41–51, 1987.
  Ülgen, M., und Schmuth, G.P.F. : Effekte des Aktivators bei der K1. II, 1- Therapie, Fortschr. Kieferorthop. 48: 41–51, 1987.
6. Ülgen, M. and Altuğ, Z.: Correction of Deep Overbite with the Edgewise Technique, German Journal of Progress in Jaw Orthopedics, Volume 48: 147–153, 1987.
  Ülgen, M., und Altuğ, Z.: Korrektur des tiefen. Bisses mit der Edgewise-Technik. Fortschr. Kieferorthop. 48: 147–153, 1987.
7. Ülgen, M.Schmuth, G.P.F. and Schumacher, H.A : Expansion and Residiv, German Journal of Progress in JawOrthopedics, Volume 49: 324–330, 1988.
  Ülgen, M., Schmuth, G.P.F. und Schumacher, H.A : Dehnung und Residiv. Fortschr. Kieferorthop. 49: 324–330, 1988.

=== Journals In English ===
1. Ülgen, M.: Cephalometric Investigation and Comparison of the Effect of Distal- Bite Class II Therapy on the Facial Skeleton, using the Activator and Cervical Headgear (Kephalometrische Untersuchung der Auswirkungen der Distalbissbehandlung mit dem Aktivator und dem Zervikalheadgear auf das Gesichtsskelett und deren Vergleich), Amer. J. Orthodont. Rev. and Abst. 81:346, 1982.
2. Ülgen, M.: Relapse During and After Retention (Rezidive Waehrend und Nach der RetentionRelapse) Amer. J. Orthodont. Rev.and Abst. 87: 411, 1985.
3. Ülgen, M., and Yolalan, C.: Evaluation of Class III Malocclusions Through Coben Cephalometric Analysis (Angle K1. III Anomalilerin Coben Sefalometrik Analizi ile İncelenmesi) Amer. J. Orthodont. Rev. and Abst. 95 (3): 269, 1989.
4. Ülgen, M. and Fıratlı, S. : The effects of the Fränkel's Function Regulator On The Class III Malocclusion. Am. J. Orthod. Dentofac. Orthop. 105: 561–567, 1994.
5. Fıratlı, S. and Ülgen M.: The Effects of the FR-3 Appliance on the Transversal Direction. Am. J. Orthod. Dentofac. Orthop 110: 55–60, 1996.
6. Erbay, E., Uğur, T., and Ülgen, M.: The Effects of Fränkel's Function Regulator (FR-4) Therapy on the Treatment of Angle Class I Skeletal OpenBite Malocclusion. Am. J. Orthod. Dentofac. Orthop. 108: 9–21, 1995.
7. Ülgen, M., Baran, S., Kaya, H., and Karadede, I.: The Influence of the Masticatory Hypofunction on the Craniofacial Growth and Development in Rats. Am. J. Orthod. Dentofac. Orthop. 111: 189–198, 1997.
