= Yahma, Kozlu =

Yahma
- Neighbourhood
- Location in Turkey
- Coordinates: 41°22′36″N 31°44′3″E
- Country: Turkey
- Province: Zonguldak
- District: Kozlu
- Municipality: Kozlu
- Population (2022): 504
- Time zone: UTC+3 (TRT)

Yahma is a neighbourhood of the town Kozlu, Kozlu District, Zonguldak Province, Turkey. Its population is 504 (2022).
