= Şipali, İnegöl =

Village in Turkey

Şipali
- Neighbourhood
- Location in Turkey Şipali (Marmara)
- Coordinates: 40°05′31″N 29°33′27″E
- Country: Turkey
- Province: Bursa
- District: İnegöl
- Population (2022): 620
- Time zone: UTC+3 (TRT)

Şipali is a neighbourhood in the municipality and district of İnegöl, Bursa Province in Turkey. Its population is 620 (2022).
