= Akıncılar, Bursa Province =

Village in Turkey

Akıncılar
- Neighbourhood
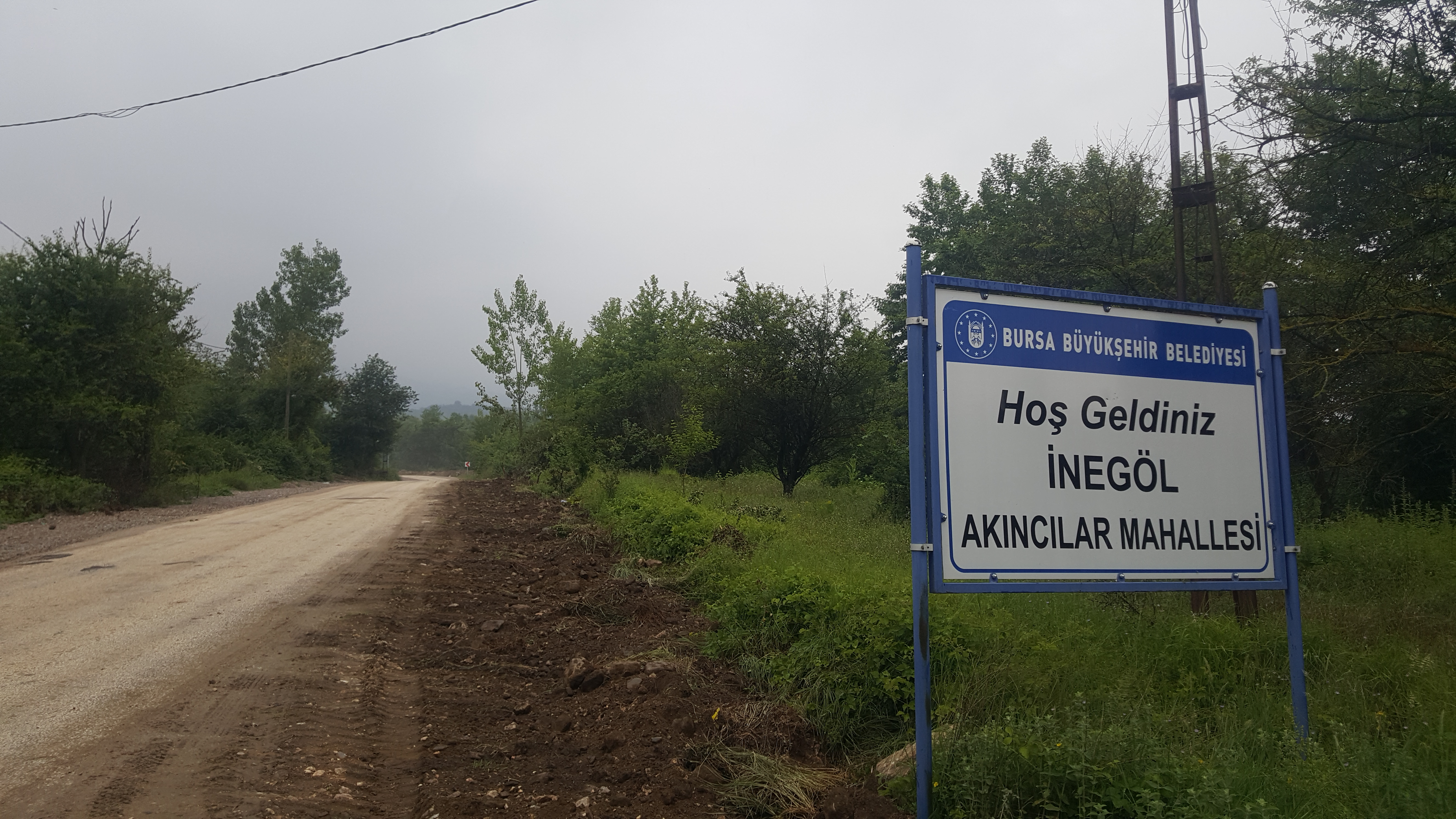

- Location within Turkey Location within Marmara
- Coordinates: 40.1118°N 29.3949°E
- Country: Turkey
- Province: Bursa
- District: İnegöl
- Population (2022): 334
- Time zone: UTC+3 (TRT)

Akıncılar is a neighbourhood in the municipality and district of İnegöl, Bursa Province in Turkey. Its population is 334 (2022).
