= Tuzla, İnegöl =

Village in Turkey

Tuzla
- Neighbourhood
- Location in Turkey Tuzla (Marmara)
- Coordinates: 40°00′39″N 29°24′50″E
- Country: Turkey
- Province: Bursa
- District: İnegöl
- Population (2022): 135
- Time zone: UTC+3 (TRT)

Tuzla (formerly: İnayet) is a neighbourhood in the municipality and district of İnegöl, Bursa Province in Turkey. Its population is 135 (2022).
