= Kozluca, İnegöl =

Village in Turkey

Kozluca
- Neighbourhood
- Location in Turkey Kozluca (Marmara)
- Coordinates: 40.1212°N 29.5634°E
- Country: Turkey
- Province: Bursa
- District: İnegöl
- Population (2022): 382
- Time zone: UTC+3 (TRT)

Kozluca is a neighbourhood in the municipality and district of İnegöl, Bursa Province in Turkey. Its population is 382 (2022).
