= Boğazköy, İnegöl =

Village in Turkey

Boğazköy
- Neighbourhood
- Location in Turkey Boğazköy (Marmara)
- Coordinates: 40.1759°N 29.5294°E
- Country: Turkey
- Province: Bursa
- District: İnegöl
- Population (2022): 453
- Time zone: UTC+3 (TRT)

Boğazköy is a neighbourhood in the municipality and district of İnegöl, Bursa Province in Turkey. Its population is 453 (2022).
