= Karalar, İnegöl =

Village in Turkey

Karalar
- Neighbourhood
- Location in Turkey Karalar (Marmara)
- Coordinates: 40.130°N 29.488°E
- Country: Turkey
- Province: Bursa
- District: İnegöl
- Population (2022): 438
- Time zone: UTC+3 (TRT)

Karalar is a neighbourhood in the municipality and district of İnegöl, Bursa Province, Turkey. Its population is 438 (2022).

== Geography ==
It is 52 km from Bursa city center and 7 km from İnegöl.

== Population ==
Historical population
| Year | Pop. | ±% p.a. |
|---|---|---|
| 1997 | 223 | — |
| 2007 | 278 | +2.23% |
| 2012 | 236 | −3.22% |
| 2017 | 359 | +8.75% |
| 2022 | 438 | +4.06% |
Source: 1997 census and TÜIK (2007-2022)
