= Akhisar, İnegöl =

Village in Turkey

Akhisar
- Neighbourhood
- Location in Turkey Akhisar (Marmara)
- Coordinates: 40°07′10″N 29°28′00″E
- Country: Turkey
- Province: Bursa
- District: İnegöl
- Population (2022): 15,198
- Time zone: UTC+3 (TRT)

Akhisar is a neighbourhood in the municipality and district of İnegöl, Bursa Province in Turkey. Its population is 15,198 (2022).
