= Isa Sofi =

İsa Sofi

General information
- Type: Tomb
- Location: Borcak, Söğüt, Bilecik Province, Turkey
- Coordinates: 40.04548139861482°N 30.20884811311386°E

The Tomb of İsa Sofi (Turkish: İsa sofu türbesi) is an early 14th century tomb located in Borcak, Söğüt in the district of Bilecik, Turkey. The tomb contains "shamanic" decorations of Gök Tanrı (sky god), related to Central Asian Turkish beliefs—the first such decorations found in Anatolia. The tomb was dedicated to İsa Sofi, a friend of Ertuğrul, father of Osman Gazi (Osman I), founder of the dynasty that ruled the Ottoman Empire. İsa Sofi had a lodge in the area at the time of Osman I.

It is similar architecturally to the tombs of Gülruh Sultan and Gülşah Hatun in Bursa.

== Decorations ==
The decorations, which are in good condition, were discovered during the tomb's renovation, revealed when plaster was scraped away. The decorations of the tomb bear no Islamic imagery, and they are unlike those of any other tomb in Turkey.

The tomb contains no Islamic elements except for its orientation.

== Use ==
Up until recently, the site continued to have social and religious importance for the village, serving as a local pilgrimage site and location for Hıdırellez celebrations.
