= Kınık, İnegöl =

Village in Turkey

Kınık
- Neighbourhood
- Location in Turkey Kınık (Marmara)
- Coordinates: 40°01′09″N 29°39′22″E
- Country: Turkey
- Province: Bursa
- District: İnegöl
- Population (2022): 151
- Time zone: UTC+3 (TRT)

Kınık is a neighbourhood in the municipality and district of İnegöl, Bursa Province in Turkey. Its population is 151 (2022).
