= Doğanyurdu, İnegöl =

Village in Turkey

Doğanyurdu
- Neighbourhood
- Location in Turkey Doğanyurdu (Marmara)
- Coordinates: 40°03′N 29°26′E
- Country: Turkey
- Province: Bursa
- District: İnegöl
- Population (2022): 133
- Time zone: UTC+3 (TRT)

Doğanyurdu is a neighbourhood in the municipality and district of İnegöl, Bursa Province in Turkey. Its population is 133 (2022).
