= Dömez, Söğüt =

Dömez
- Village
- Location within Turkey Location within Marmara
- Coordinates: 40.0034°N 30.1091°E
- Country: Turkey
- Province: Bilecik
- District: Söğüt
- Population (2021): 71
- Time zone: UTC+3 (TRT)

Dömez is a village in the Söğüt District, Bilecik Province, Turkey. Its population is 71 (2021).
