= Sulhiye, İnegöl =

Village in Turkey

Sulhiye
- Neighbourhood
- Location in Turkey Sulhiye (Marmara)
- Coordinates: 39°56′N 29°42′E
- Country: Turkey
- Province: Bursa
- District: İnegöl
- Population (2022): 219
- Time zone: UTC+3 (TRT)

Sulhiye is a neighbourhood in the municipality and district of İnegöl, Bursa Province in Turkey. Its population is 219 (2022).
