= Eski Bahçekaya, İnegöl =

Village in Turkey

Eski Bahçekaya
- Neighbourhood
- Location in Turkey Eski Bahçekaya (Marmara)
- Coordinates: 39°55′23″N 29°36′36″E
- Country: Turkey
- Province: Bursa
- District: İnegöl
- Population (2022): 148
- Time zone: UTC+3 (TRT)

Eski Bahçekaya (formerly: Mesruriye) is a neighbourhood in the municipality and district of İnegöl, Bursa Province in Turkey. Its population is 148 (2022).
