= Ortaköy, İnegöl =

Village in Turkey

Coordinates: 40.024°N 29.569°E

Ortaköy
- Neighbourhood
- Location in Turkey Ortaköy (Marmara)
- Coordinates
- Country: Turkey
- Province: Bursa
- District: İnegöl
- Population (2022): 810
- Time zone: UTC+3 (TRT)

Ortaköy is a neighbourhood in the municipality and district of İnegöl, Bursa Province in Turkey. Its population is 810 (2022).
