= Kozlu, Zonguldak =

Kozlu
- Municipality
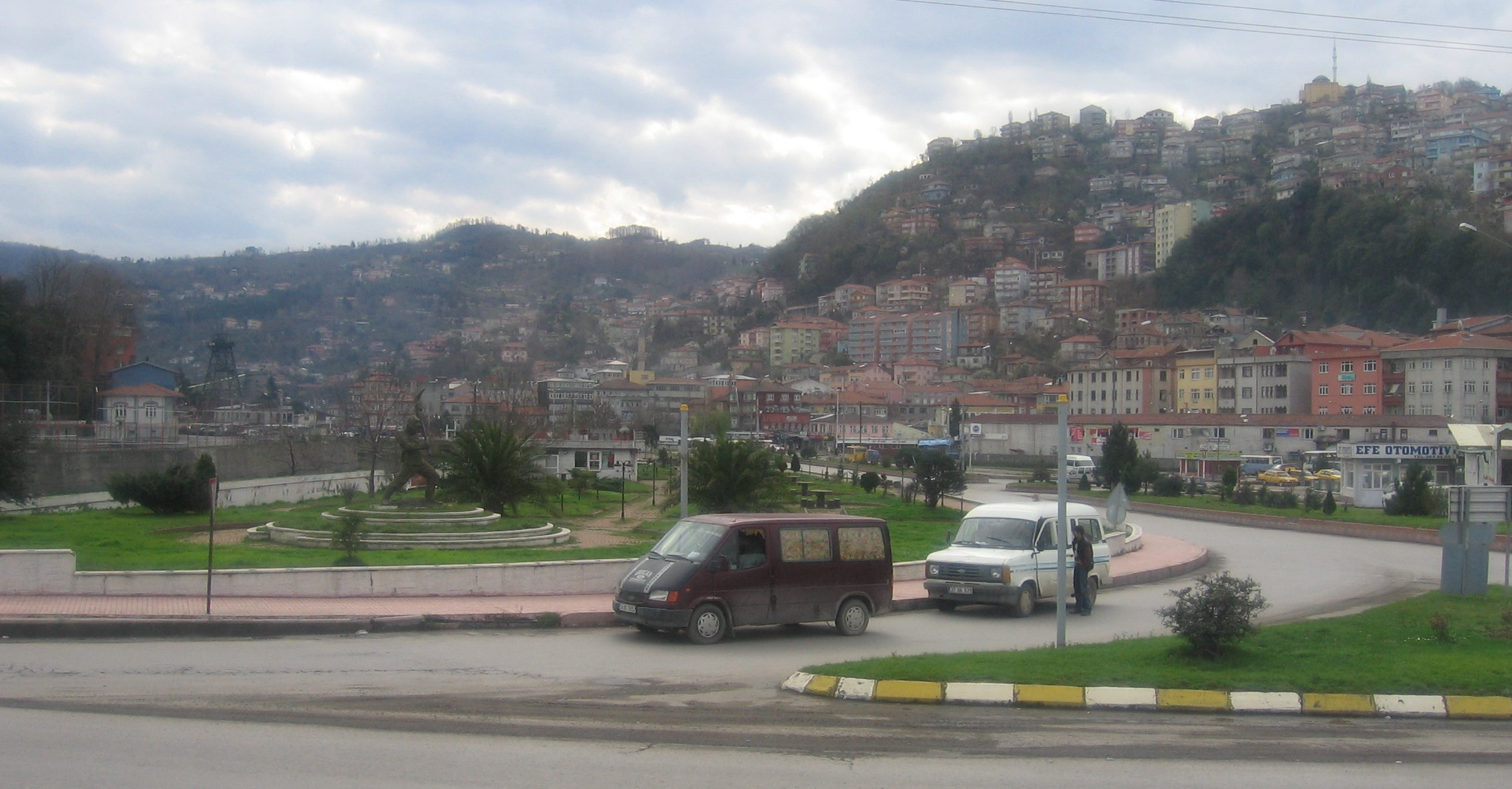
- A view of Kozlu

- Location within Turkey
- Coordinates: 41°26′N 31°45′E
- Country: Turkey
- Province: Zonguldak
- District: Kozlu

Government
  - Mayor: Altuğ Dökmeci (CHP)
- Elevation: 25 m (82 ft)
- Population (2022): 43,140
- Time zone: UTC+3 (TRT)
- Postal code: 67600
- Area code: 0372
- Climate: Cfb
- Website: www.kozlu.bel.tr

Kozlu is a town in the central part of Zonguldak Province, Turkey. It is situated at the coast of the Black Sea, west of Zonguldak city. It is almost merged with Zonguldak. It is the seat of Kozlu District. Its population is 43,140 (2022). It is a relatively new town, founded after coal deposits around Zonguldak were discovered. In 1926 the coal company of Kozlu was founded. In 1936 the government of Turkey bought Kozlu's coal mines and the surrounding other mines. At the present Kozlu is a typical mining town. It consists of 9 neighbourhoods: Merkez, Güney, Ihsaniye, Kılıç, 19 Mayıs, Taşbaca, Fatih Sitesi, Esenköy and Yahma.
