= Bayramşah, İnegöl =

Village in Turkey

Bayramşah
- Neighbourhood
- Location in Turkey Bayramşah (Marmara)
- Coordinates: 40.1095°N 29.6582°E
- Country: Turkey
- Province: Bursa
- District: İnegöl
- Population (2022): 96
- Time zone: UTC+3 (TRT)

Bayramşah is a neighbourhood in the municipality and district of İnegöl, Bursa Province in Turkey. Its population is 96 (2022).
