= Halhalca, İnegöl =

Village in Turkey

Halhalca
- Neighbourhood
- Location in Turkey Halhalca (Marmara)
- Coordinates: 40°10′N 29°26′E
- Country: Turkey
- Province: Bursa
- District: İnegöl
- Population (2022): 250
- Time zone: UTC+3 (TRT)

Halhalca is a neighbourhood in the municipality and district of İnegöl, Bursa Province in Turkey. Its population is 250 (2022).
