= Eskiköy, İnegöl =

Village in Turkey

Eskiköy
- Neighbourhood
- Country: Turkey
- Province: Bursa
- District: İnegöl
- Population (2022): 71
- Time zone: UTC+3 (TRT)

Eskiköy is a neighbourhood in the municipality and district of İnegöl, Bursa Province in Turkey. Its population is 71 (2022).
