= Yeniyörük, İnegöl =

Village in Turkey

Yeniyörük
- Neighbourhood
- Location in Turkey Yeniyörük (Marmara)
- Coordinates: 40°09′N 29°36′E
- Country: Turkey
- Province: Bursa
- District: İnegöl
- Population (2022): 194
- Time zone: UTC+3 (TRT)

Yeniyörük is a neighbourhood in the municipality and district of İnegöl, Bursa Province in Turkey. Its population is 194 (2022).
