= Hamdi Kayapınar =

Turkish serial killer (born 1979)

- Born: 1979 (age 46–47); Melikgazi, Kayseri Province, Turkey
- Other name: Avcı ("The Hunter")
- Occupation: Scrap collecting
- Criminal charges: Murder
- Capture status: Arrested

Details
- Victims: 8
- Span of crimes: 1994–2018
- Weapons: rifle, knife

Hamdi Kayapınar (born 1979) is a Turkish serial killer who dubbed himself as "Avcı" ("The Hunter").

In his youth, he strangled his younger sibling to death. Later, he killed six other people, and was sentenced to life in prison. In 2017, after 16 years of imprisonment, he was released on probation. In 2018, he was arrested on charges of killing his eighth victim and pleaded guilty.

== Early life ==
Hamdi Kayapınar was born in the Erenköy neighbourhood of the Melikgazi district in Kayseri Province, Turkey, in 1979. He had three siblings, and earned his livelihood by collecting scrap. In 2001, he was living with his mother and sister in a shack along the city water canal in Kayseri's Yıldırım Bayezıt neighbourhood.

== First murder ==
In 1994, at the age of 14, he committed his first murder by strangling his one-year younger sibling with a cord on the grounds of jealousy, as he believed his parents liked his sibling more than they liked him. He was imprisoned, but was released on probation after four years.

== Six more victims ==
In 2002, he was arrested and accused of killing six people, namely Yaşar Sezer, Ali Aras, Abdullah Aslan, Memiş Dinçaslan, İbrahim Genç, and Cafer Şahin, and wounding four others with the intention to kill, including Bedrettin Duvar, and police officer İlhan Duruş, between March 1998 and February 2001.

On the night of 30 March 1998, businessman Yaşar Sezer (46) was shot dead by a single bullet in the back of the neck in front of his home. His body was found the next morning in the nearby water canal. His money and wristwatch had been stolen. About one year later, around midnight, in April 1999, İbrahim Aydemir (37) was shot as he was riding a bicycle along the canal to his home. He was hit by a shotgun, and severely wounded. The attacker left him, although he noticed that his victim was not dead. Three days after the attack on Aydemir, a worker, Bünyamin Selvitop (25), was shot in the same area at midnight. He was only wounded. The attacker left the scene. One week after the attack on Selvitop, the body of Memiş Dinçaslan (52) was found in the canal. His money had been stolen. The residents around the canal dubbed the perpetrator "Kanal canavarı" ("The Canal Monster"). Police officer İlhan Duruş was shot and severely wounded in the leg while chasing a suspect on foot. The attacker apparently shot at his police car and fled. However, the police were able to identify him as a 1.60 m (5 ft 3 in)-tall, slim man in his twenties.

No crime happened in the area for the next two years. Towards the end of 2000, İbrahim Genç, the nightwatchman of a gas station located along the canal, was found dead by the employees. He had been shot at close range and his valuables had been taken. A murder attempt occurred one month later. Shortly before midnight on 31 January 2001, Bedrettin Duvar (47), a coal trader, was shot by an attacker wielding a shotgun on his return home. The perpetrator ran away, as he saw the victim was only wounded. A couple of days later, three bodies were found along the canal. Cafer Şahin and Abdullah Aslan had been shot in the neck. Construction worker Ali Araz was shot dead in the chest by a shotgun. Again, the victims' valuables were missing. The perpetrator had left a shell casing at the scene, which became important evidence for the police.

== Police investigation ==
A few days after the murder of Yaşar Sezer, in April 1998, Kayapınar was arrested together with his brother, Ümit Kayapınar, after the two confessed to the robbery of a hunting equipment shop. They served four months in prison. However, the police could not link them to Sezer's murder.

In 2001, the Kayseri Police homicide department sought advice in Ankara from Robert W. Taylor, lecturer of criminal law at the University of North Texas, and his colleague Edward Huesken, on the matter of methods of investigation of serial killers. Further investigations revealed that the five attacks committed over the past two years were centred in a 10 km (6.2 mi)-long area along the canal. Police speculated that the perpetrator must have lived close to the canal and so know the area very well. Kayapınar was the only suspect from that area, who was absent during the 19 months when no crimes were committed. During this period, he had been in Çanakkale for his compulsory military service. He had been interrogated right after the wounding of police officer Duruş but had been released due to lack of evidence.

== Arrest ==
In 2001, the police raided Kayapınar's home in a midnight action. However, Kayapınar was able to escape barefoot. The police found a pair of bloodstained trousers on which the blood matched the DNA of the last victim, Cafer Şahin. Kayapınar's sister, who said that he had threatened her with death, showed the police the place where the shotgun was buried. Surprisingly, Kayapınar appeared at the police station the next morning asking why he was wanted. After he was confronted with the evidence, he began to talk.

At the time of his arrest, Kayapınar asserted that he developed resentment towards people because he had been marginalized by his family and the community after his release from prison. He dubbed himself "Avcı" ("The Hunter"), his victims as "av" ("prey"), and the money or goods he usurped as "ganimet" ("bounty").

== Trial and conviction ==
During the trial in 2001, Kayapınar told the judge and the court that he won the bet he had made with another serial killer, Seyit Ahmet Demirci, on the number of people killed. In 2002, Kayapınar was sentenced to 169 years and 7 months in prison, which amounted to two life imprisonments, 12 1/2 years for stealing the victims' money, and 16 years for causing injury.

Kayapınar was kept in solitary confinement for two years. After serving his sentence in the closed prisons in Kayseri and Sivas, he was transferred to a semi-open prison in Ankara in accordance with the old Law on Incarceration. When he did not return to the prison following an official free daytime leave, he was treated as an escapee due to an on-leave violation. In February 2016, he was caught in the house of a relative at Talas, Kayseri. He was tried and incarcerated in the closed prison in Kayseri. Kayapınar was released on probation in February 2017.

== Eighth murder ==
On 2 August 2018, retired specialist sergeant Sami Yılmaz (47), who was on duty as the security guard of a villa in Kayseri, was attacked and killed with a shotgun in his cabin by an unknown man who wore a balaclava and gloves. The perpetrator arrived by bicycle. He stole the guard's handgun and some other valuables before escaping. A special police team identified the murderer as Kayapınar, after viewing 950 hours of MOBESE (Turkish for "Mobile Electronic System Integration") public safety CCTV camera footage. The perpetrator rode a red bicycle, as he had done during his previous crimes. On 7 August, Kayapınar was arrested and a search in his home uncovered the balaclava, gloves, two handguns that he had stolen from the guard, the shotgun used as the murder weapon, and 83 shotgun shells. Kayapınar pleaded guilty. He said that he planned the crime over a period of three days and killed the guard because "he liked his gun".

== See also ==
- List of serial killers by country
