= Tüfekçikonak, İnegöl =

Village in Turkey

Tüfekçikonak
- Neighbourhood
- Location in Turkey Tüfekçikonak (Marmara)
- Coordinates: 39°56′N 29°40′E
- Country: Turkey
- Province: Bursa
- District: İnegöl
- Population (2022): 185
- Time zone: UTC+3 (TRT)

Tüfekçikonak is a neighbourhood in the municipality and district of İnegöl, Bursa Province in Turkey. Its population is 185 (2022).
