= Sungurpaşa, İnegöl =

Village in Turkey

Sungurpaşa
- Neighbourhood
- Location in Turkey Sungurpaşa (Marmara)
- Coordinates: 40°11′00″N 29°29′05″E
- Country: Turkey
- Province: Bursa
- District: İnegöl
- Population (2022): 333
- Time zone: UTC+3 (TRT)

Sungurpaşa is a neighbourhood in the municipality and district of İnegöl, Bursa Province in Turkey. Its population is 333 (2022).
