= Aşağıballık, İnegöl =

Village in Turkey

Aşağıballık
- Neighbourhood
- Location in Turkey Aşağıballık (Marmara)
- Coordinates: 40°00′N 29°37′E
- Country: Turkey
- Province: Bursa
- District: İnegöl
- Population (2022): 359
- Time zone: UTC+3 (TRT)

Aşağıballık is a neighbourhood in the municipality and district of İnegöl, Bursa Province in Turkey. Its population is 359 (2022).
