= Hocaköy, İnegöl =

Village in Turkey

Hocaköy
- Neighbourhood
- Location in Turkey Hocaköy (Marmara)
- Coordinates: 40°3′18″N 29°28′34″E
- Country: Turkey
- Province: Bursa
- District: İnegöl
- Population (2022): 1,000
- Time zone: UTC+3 (TRT)

Hocaköy is a neighbourhood in the municipality and district of İnegöl, Bursa Province in Turkey. Its population is 1,000 (2022).
