= Savcıbey, Söğüt =

Savcıbey
- Village
- Location within Turkey Location within Marmara
- Coordinates: 39°57′N 30°11′E
- Country: Turkey
- Province: Bilecik
- District: Söğüt
- Population (2021): 144
- Time zone: UTC+3 (TRT)

Savcıbey is a village in the Söğüt District, Bilecik Province, Turkey. Its population is 144 (2021).
