= Yeniceköy, Bursa =

Yeniceköy
- Neighbourhood
- Location in Turkey Yeniceköy (Marmara)
- Coordinates: 40°05′18″N 29°25′16″E
- Country: Turkey
- Province: Bursa
- District: İnegöl
- Elevation: 380 m (1,250 ft)
- Population (2022): 15,287
- Time zone: UTC+3 (TRT)
- Postal code: 16400
- Area code: 0224

Yeniceköy (formerly: Yenice) is a neighbourhood of the municipality and district of İnegöl, Bursa Province, Turkey. Its population is 15,287 (2022). Before the 2013 reorganisation, it was a town (belde). It is 9 kilometres (5.6 mi) west of İnegöl and 40 kilometres (25 mi) east of Bursa.

Although no document exists about the history of the settlement, the ruins of a historical hamam suggest that the history of the town goes back to 15th century. There was a sizeable Armenian population in the past. In the early years of the 20th century migrants from Bulgaria, Greece and Georgia settled in Yeniceköy. In 1956 the settlement was declared a seat of township. Most of the town residents work in the factories around Yeniceköy and İnegöl.
