= Hamzabey, İnegöl =

Village in Turkey

Hamzabey
- Neighbourhood
- Location in Turkey Hamzabey (Marmara)
- Coordinates: 40°8′9″N 29°31′35″E
- Country: Turkey
- Province: Bursa
- District: İnegöl
- Population (2022): 982
- Time zone: UTC+3 (TRT)

Hamzabey is a neighbourhood in the municipality and district of İnegöl, Bursa Province in Turkey. Its population is 982 (2022).
