= Kestanealanı, İnegöl =

Village in Turkey

Kestanealanı
- Neighbourhood
- Location in Turkey Kestanealanı (Marmara)
- Coordinates: 40°00′06″N 29°29′45″E
- Country: Turkey
- Province: Bursa
- District: İnegöl
- Population (2022): 53
- Time zone: UTC+3 (TRT)

Kestanealanı is a neighbourhood in the municipality and district of İnegöl, Bursa Province in Turkey. Its population is 53 (2022).
