= Bahariye, İnegöl =

Village in Turkey

Bahariye
- Neighbourhood
- Location in Turkey Bahariye (Marmara)
- Coordinates: 39.9640°N 29.5817°E
- Country: Turkey
- Province: Bursa
- District: İnegöl
- Population (2022): 125
- Time zone: UTC+3 (TRT)

Bahariye is a neighbourhood in the municipality and district of İnegöl, Bursa Province in Turkey. Its population is 125 (2022).
