= Çeltikçi, İnegöl =

Village in Turkey

Çeltikçi
- Neighbourhood
- Location in Turkey Çeltikçi (Marmara)
- Coordinates: 40°4′16″N 29°28′23″E
- Country: Turkey
- Province: Bursa
- District: İnegöl
- Population (2022): 1,452
- Time zone: UTC+3 (TRT)

Çeltikçi is a neighbourhood in the municipality and district of İnegöl, Bursa Province in Turkey. Its population is 1,452 (2022).
