= Hamitabat, İnegöl =

Village in Turkey

Hamitabat
- Neighbourhood
- Country: Turkey
- Province: Bursa
- District: İnegöl
- Population (2022): 304
- Time zone: UTC+3 (TRT)

Hamitabat is a neighbourhood in the municipality and district of İnegöl, Bursa Province in Turkey. Its population is 304 (2022).
