= Karakadı, İnegöl =

Village in Turkey

Karakadı
- Neighbourhood
- Country: Turkey
- Province: Bursa
- District: İnegöl
- Population (2022): 109
- Time zone: UTC+3 (TRT)

Karakadı is a neighbourhood in the municipality and district of İnegöl, Bursa Province in Turkey. Its population is 109 (2022).
