= Muratbey, İnegöl =

Village in Turkey

Muratbey
- Neighbourhood
- Country: Turkey
- Province: Bursa
- District: İnegöl
- Population (2022): 146
- Time zone: UTC+3 (TRT)

Muratbey is a neighbourhood in the municipality and district of İnegöl, Bursa Province in Turkey. Its population is 146 (2022).
