= İnegöl =

- District and municipality
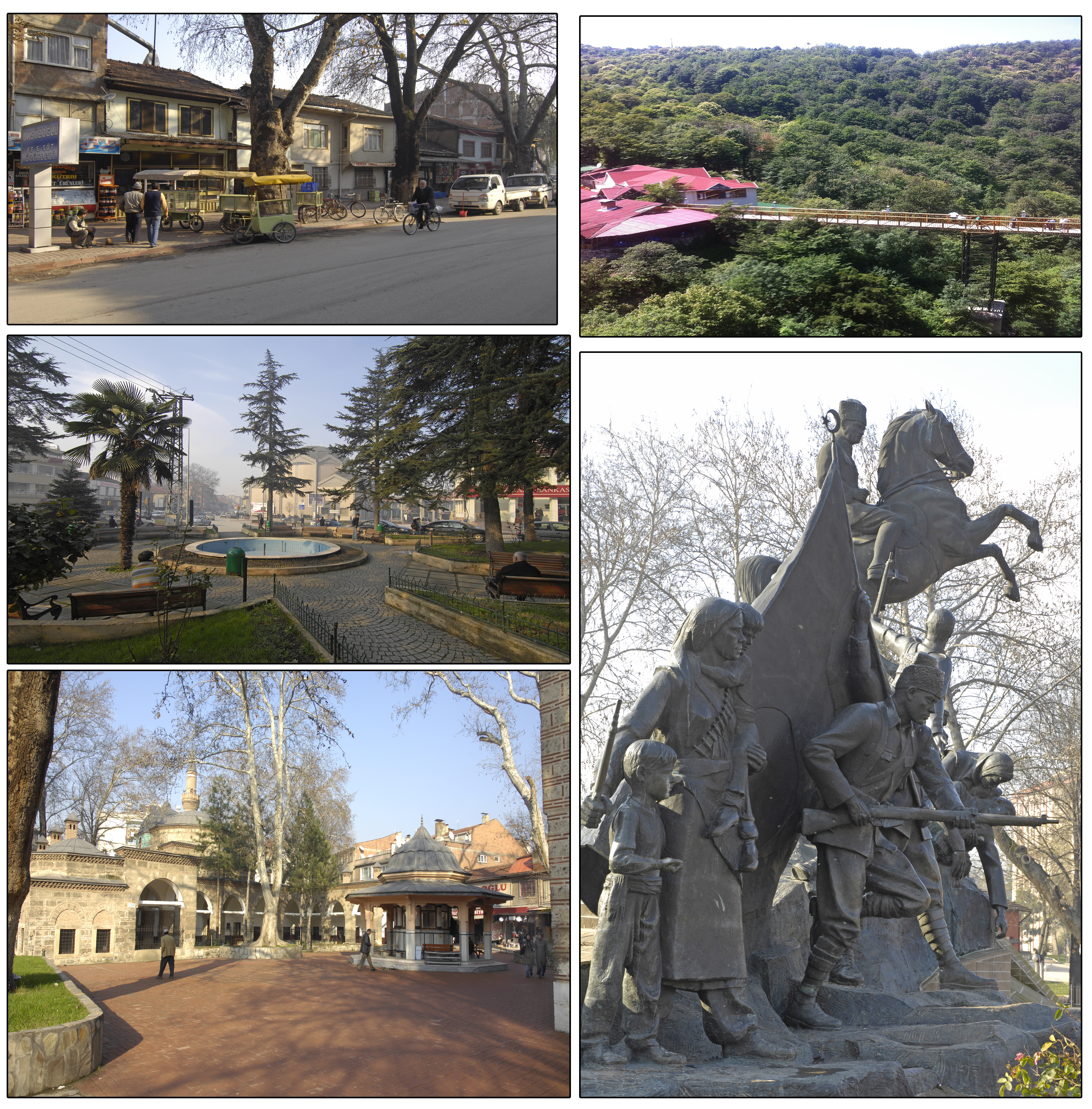
- İnegöl District

- Logo

- Map showing İnegöl District in Bursa Province

- Location within Turkey Location within Marmara
- Coordinates: 40°04′50″N 29°30′35″E
- Country: Turkey
- Province: Bursa

Government
  - Mayor: Alper Taban (AKP)
- Area: 1,118 km^{2} (432 sq mi)
- Population (2022): 294,485
  - Density: 263.4/km^{2} (682.2/sq mi)
- Time zone: UTC+3 (TRT)
- Postal code: 16400
- Area code: 0224
- Website: www.inegol.bel.tr

İnegöl (known as Ἀγγελόκωμις, Angelokomis in the Byzantine period) is a municipality and district of Bursa Province, Turkey. Its area is 1,118 km^{2} (432 sq mi), and its population is 302,251 (2024). İnegöl is one of the centers of the Turkish furniture industry, and is also known for its meatball (İnegöl köftesi) which has its origins in ćevapi brought to the region by Bosnian immigrants (Bosniaks) during the Balkan Wars.

Although considerably quieter than the neighbouring Bursa and Eskişehir, İnegöl has notable tourist attractions, such as the İnegöl City Museum and, directly next to it, the İshakpaşa Historical Mosque. Near İnegöl is the health resort of Oylat (also known as the Oylat Hotspring), adjacent to the Oylat Cave. İnegöl is also located near Uludağ, a popular skiing resort during the winter months.

== History ==
From 1867 until 1922, İnegöl was part of Hüdavendigâr vilayet. It was occupied by the Greek Army during the Greco-Turkish War (1919–1922); however, it was retaken by the Turks during the Great Offensive.

== Composition ==
There are 116 neighbourhoods in İnegöl District:

- Akbaşlar
- Akhisar
- Akıncılar
- Alibey
- Aşağıballık
- Babaoğlu
- Bahariye
- Bahçekaya
- Baykoca
- Bayramşah
- Bilalköy
- Boğazköy
- Burhaniye
- Çavuşköy
- Çaylıca
- Çayyaka
- Çeltikçi
- Cemiyet
- Cerrah
- Çiftlikköy
- Çitli
- Cuma
- Cumhuriyet
- Deydinler
- Dipsizgöl
- Doğanyurdu
- Dömez
- Edebey
- Elmaçayır
- Ertuğrulgazi
- Esenköy
- Esentepe
- Eski Bahçekaya
- Eskikaracakaya
- Eskiköy
- Eymir
- Fatih
- Fevziye
- Fındıklı
- Gazelli
- Gedikpınar
- Gülbahçe
- Gündüzlü
- Güneykestane
- Güzelyurt
- Hacıkara
- Halhalca
- Hamamlı
- Hamidiye
- Hamitabat
- Hamzabey
- Hasanpaşa
- Hayriye
- Hilmiye
- Hocaköy
- Huzur
- İclaliye
- İhsaniye
- İsaören
- Karagölet
- Karahasanlar
- Karakadı
- Karalar
- Kayapınar
- Kemalpaşa
- Kestanealanı
- Kınık
- Kıran
- Kocakonak
- Konurlar
- Kozluca
- Küçükyenice
- Kulaca
- Kurşunlu
- Lütfiye
- Madenköy
- Mahmudiye
- Mesudiye
- Mezit
- Muratbey
- Olukman
- Orhaniye
- Ortaköy
- Osmaniye
- Osmaniyeköy
- Özlüce
- Paşaören
- Rüştiye
- Saadet
- Sarıpınar
- Şehitler
- Sinanbey
- Şipali
- Soğukdere
- Süle
- Süleymaniye
- Sulhiye
- Sultaniye
- Sülüklügöl
- Sungurpaşa
- Süpürtü
- Tahtaköprü
- Tekkeköy
- Tokuş
- Tüfekçikonak
- Turgutalp
- Turgutalpköy
- Tuzla
- Yeni
- Yenice
- Yeniceköy
- Yeniköy
- Yeniyörük
- Yiğit
- Yukarıballık
- Yunusemre

== Furniture ==
İnegöl is a city surrounded by natural resources, especially forests; therefore, wood-processing businesses have always been a significant part of the city's economy. The first official record of wood-processing business was recorded in 1523 in the Hüdavendigar cadastral record book. Some villages produced oars for the galleys of the Ottoman Empire.

The furniture sector of İnegöl accounts for 88.5% of all industry. 42% of İnegöl's exports were furniture exports in 2019 ($574.559.944,38). The city is number three in Turkish furniture exports when ranked by total volume, after İstanbul and Kayseri.

There are two large furniture shopping malls in İnegöl.

== Gallery ==
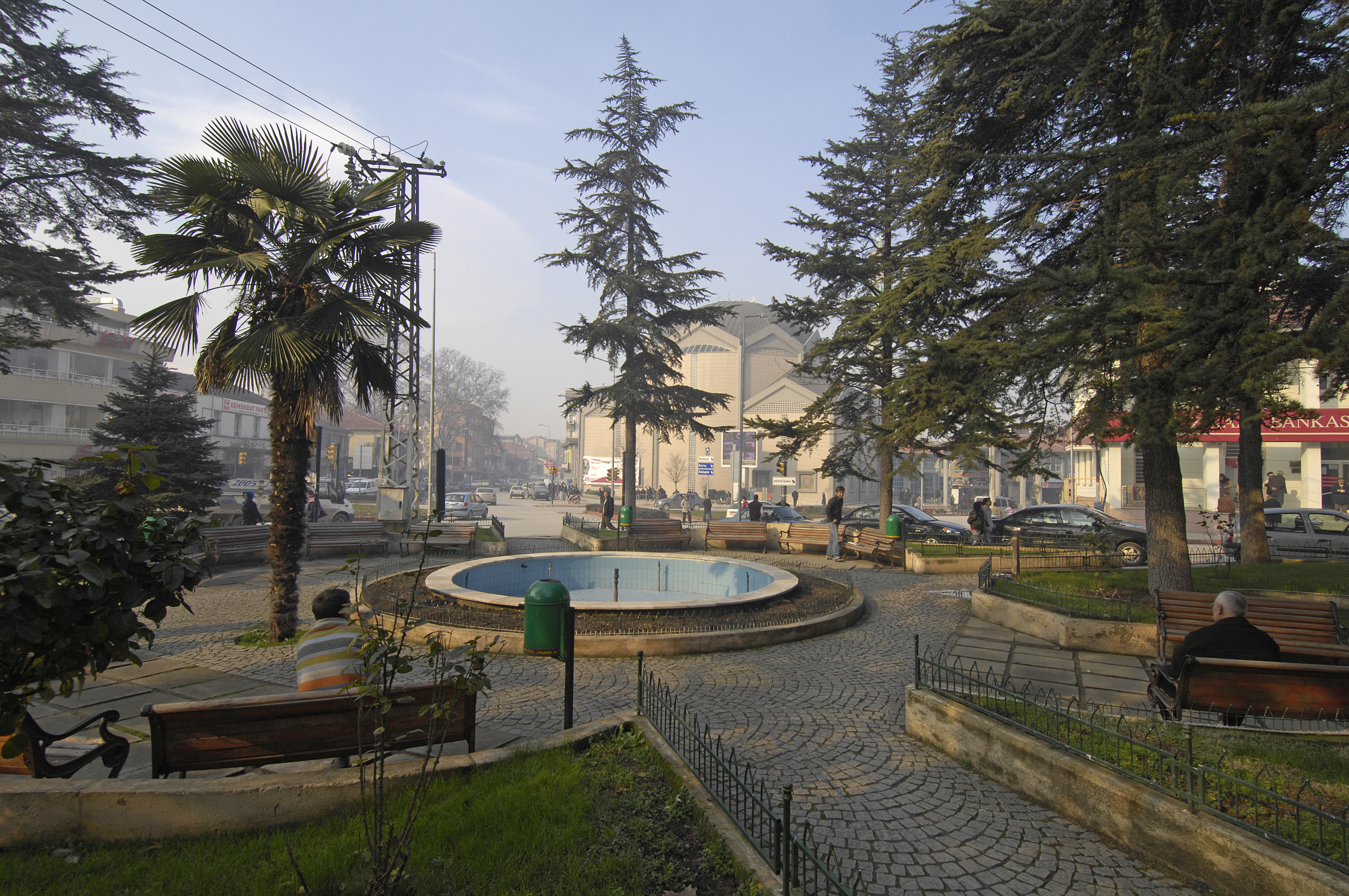
Inegöl general view

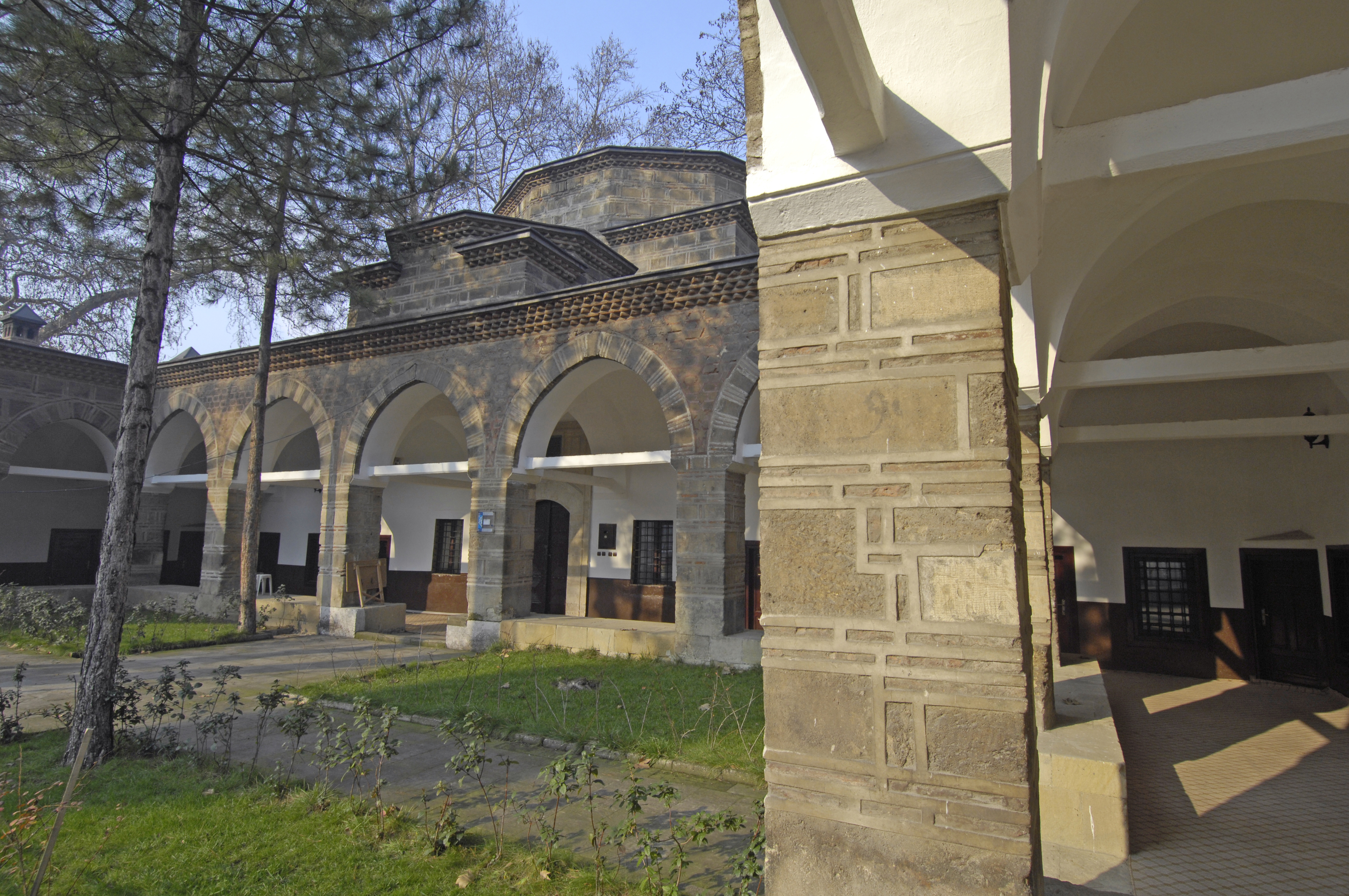
Front view of Inegöl Işak Paşa Külliyesi

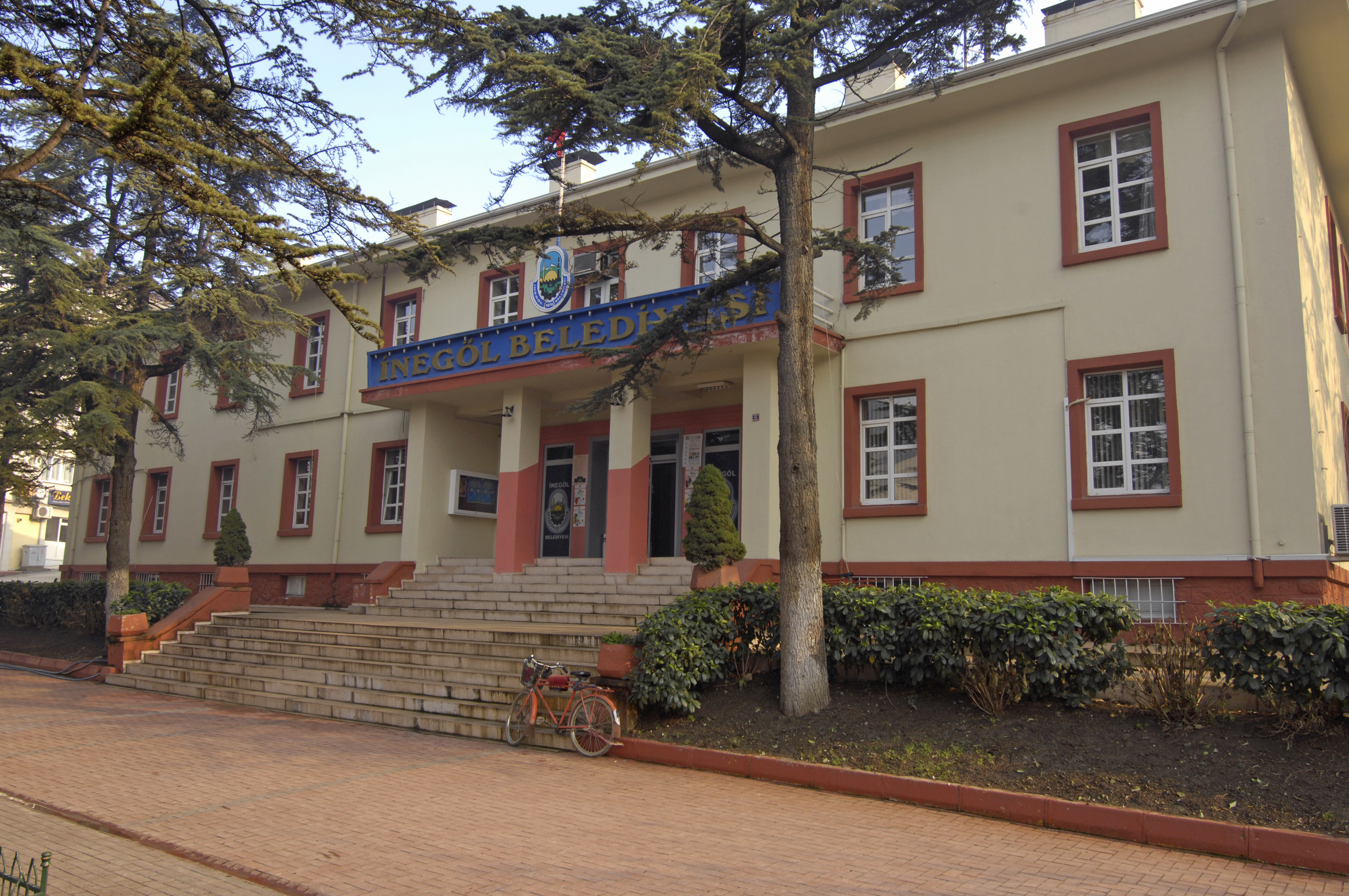
Inegöl city hall

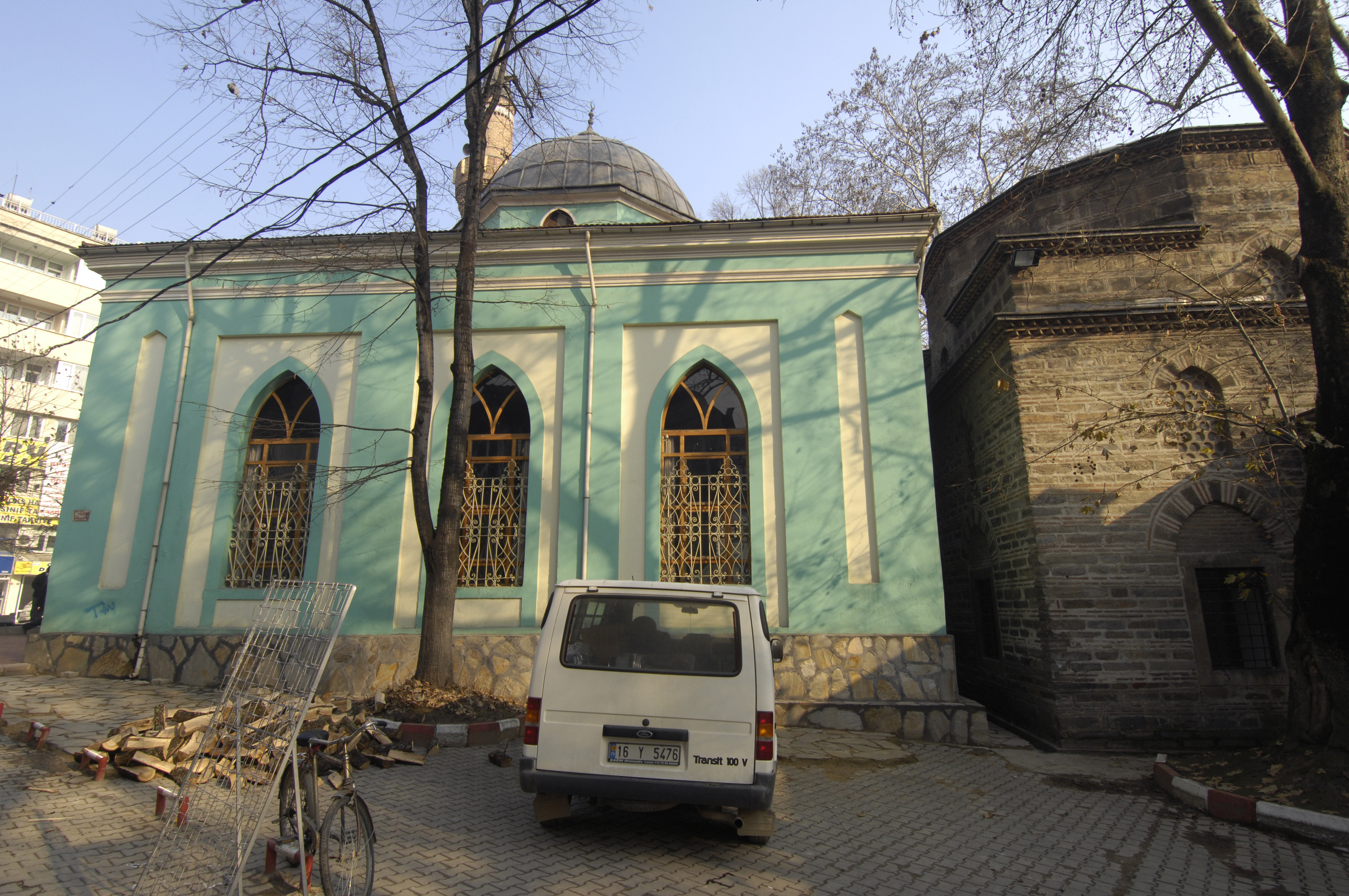
Inegöl Yıldırım Mosque, also known as Yıldırım Camii

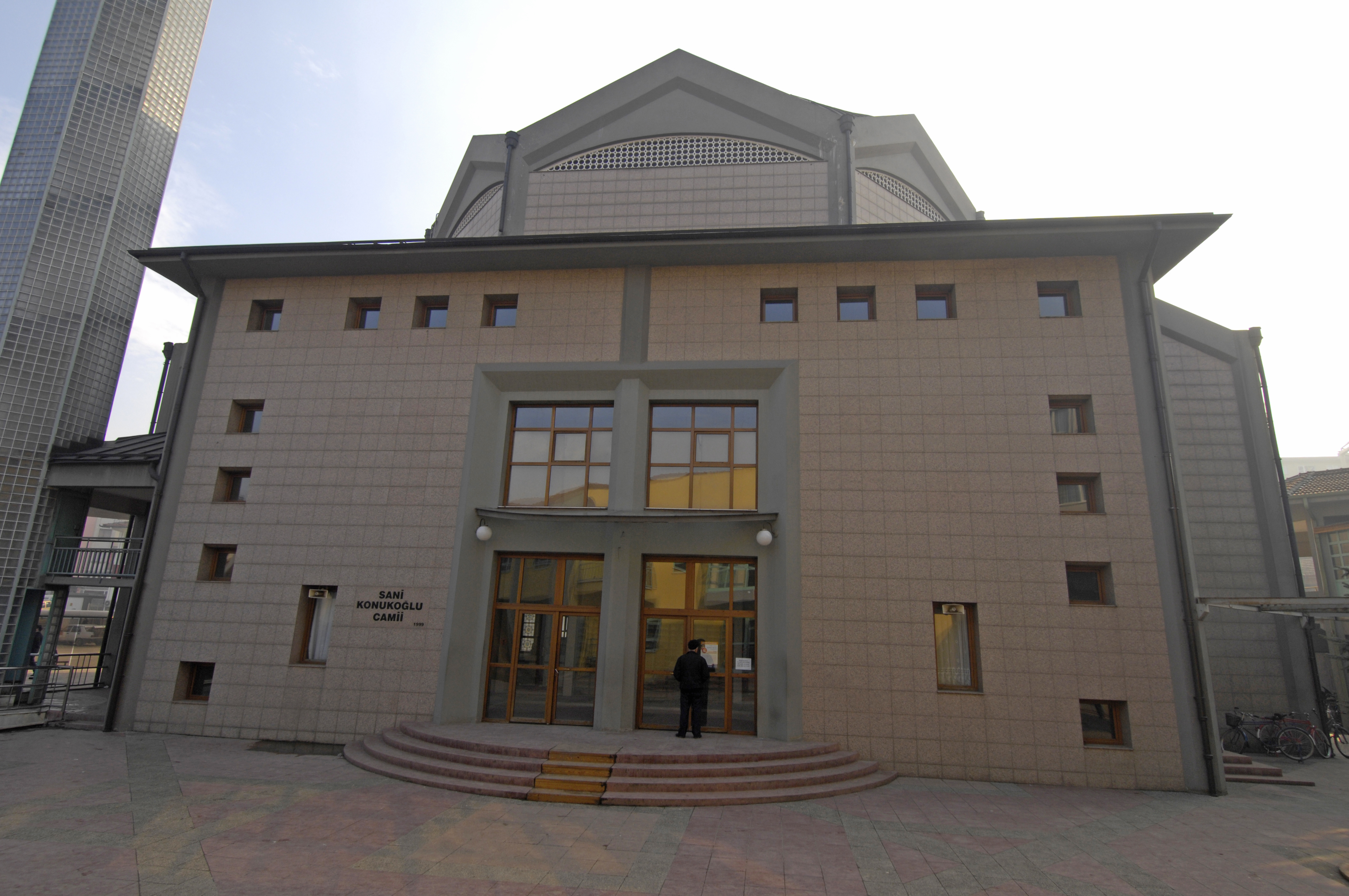
Inegöl Sani Konukoĝlu Mosque, also known as Sani Konukoĝlu Camii

== Notable people ==
Notable residents include Mustafa Ülgen, an orthodontist. A section of the İnegöl Kent Müzesi (museum) is dedicated to him.

== Twin cities ==
- Donji Vakuf, Bosnia and Herzegovina
- Dunaújváros, Hungary
- Mitrovica, Kosovo
- Takhtamukaysky District, Russia
- Novi Pazar, Bulgaria, Bulgaria
