= Esenköy, Kozlu =

Esenköy
- Neighbourhood
- Location in Turkey
- Coordinates: 41°24′43″N 31°41′42″E
- Country: Turkey
- Province: Zonguldak
- District: Kozlu
- Municipality: Kozlu
- Population (2022): 3,430
- Time zone: UTC+3 (TRT)

Esenköy is a neighbourhood of the town Kozlu, Kozlu District, Zonguldak Province, Turkey. Its population is 3,430 (2022).
