= Akbaşlar, İnegöl =

Village in Turkey

Akbaşlar
- Neighbourhood
- Location in Turkey Akbaşlar (Marmara)
- Coordinates: 40.0979°N 29.5942°E
- Country: Turkey
- Province: Bursa
- District: İnegöl
- Population (2022): 165
- Time zone: UTC+3 (TRT)

Akbaşlar is a neighbourhood in the municipality and district of İnegöl, Bursa Province in Turkey. Its population is 165 (2022).
