= Seyit Ahmet Demirci =

Turkish serial killer

- Born: 10 November 1970 (age 55); Fatsa, Ordu Province, Turkey
- Other name: "Mobilyacı katili" ("The Furniture Dealers' Killer"
- Criminal charges: Murder
- Capture status: Arrested

Details
- Victims: 3
- Span of crimes: May 5, 1998 – June 6, 1998

Seyit Ahmet Demirci (born 10 November 1970) is a Turkish serial killer, who is dubbed "Mobilyacı katili" ("The Furniture Dealers' Killer") in the media. He was convicted of killing three different furniture dealers.

Seyit Ahmet Demirci grew up in Fatsa, Ordu Province, northern Turkey.

As a child, he worked in a furniture shop. He claimed that at the age of 11, the elderly shop owner had sexually abused him in the basement of the shop. He also claimed to have witnessed the molestation of a co-worker by the same employer in the shop basement.

He moved to Istanbul and developed hatred towards furniture dealers, particularly those who said they had some other furniture in the basement. He committed his first murder shooting Ali Osman Beldek in the neck at the Turgut Reis neighborhood of Esenler, Istanbul on 5 May 1998. Then, he shot Mehmet Kayatuzu dead in Bağcılar, Istanbul on 4 June 1998, and two days later killed Celal Pınargöz, also in Esenler. All three victims were selected randomly and unknown to him. His modus operandi was to shoot them with a single bullet in the neck in their shop's basement. He was dubbed by the media as "Mobilyacı katili" ("The Furniture Dealers' Killer").

He was arrested and prosecuted for serial murder. The judge focused on the possibility that mental illness was the cause of his criminality, despite the fact that three forensic medicine institutions attested that he had a sound mind. The court wanted to sentence him with leniency, however, he was sentenced to the death penalty on three counts.

Demirci stated that, had he not been caught, he would have continued until he had killed eleven victims. The significance of the number eleven for him was that was his age at the time of the alleged molestation.

== See also ==
- List of serial killers by country
