= Cerrah =

- Neighbourhood
- Location in Turkey Cerrah (Marmara)
- Coordinates: 40°04′16″N 29°26′48″E
- Country: Turkey
- Province: Bursa
- District: İnegöl
- Elevation: 330 m (1,080 ft)
- Population (2022): 4,949
- Time zone: UTC+3 (TRT)
- Postal code: 16415
- Area code: 0224

Cerrah is a neighbourhood of the municipality and district of İnegöl, Bursa Province, Turkey. Its population is 4,949 (2022). Before the 2013 reorganisation, it was a town (belde). It is 5 kilometres (3 mi) west of İnegöl and 45 kilometres (28 mi) east of Bursa.

The historical settlement was declared a seat of township in 1989. In addition to farming, furniture industry and trade in the nearby İnegöl constitute a major source of revenue for the town. Along the Cerrah creek from Uludağ there are picnic areas established by the municipality. There is also a low power hydroelectric plant (800 000 kW-hr/year) on the creek.
