= Hayriye, İnegöl =

Village in Turkey

Hayriye
- Neighbourhood
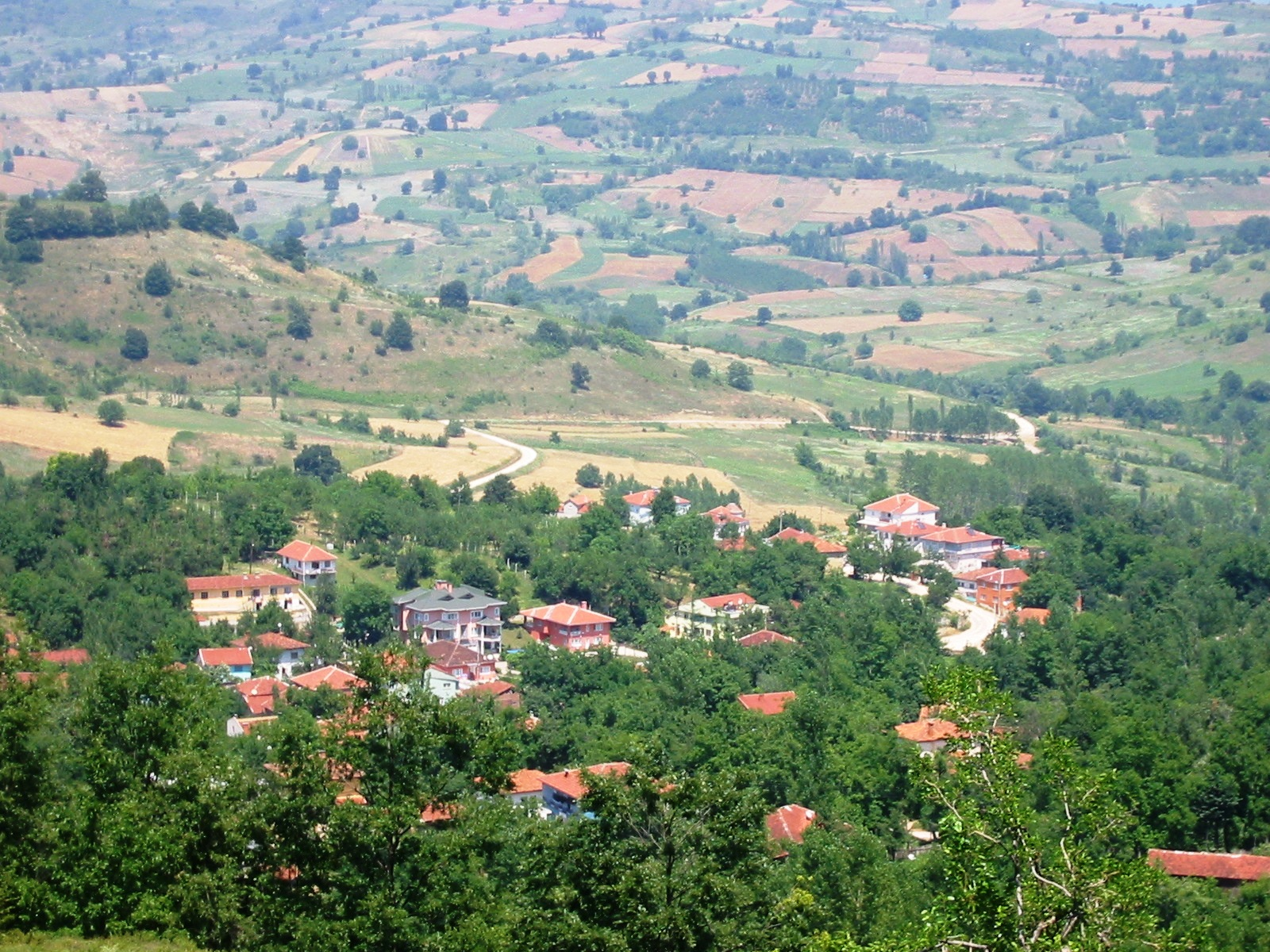

- Location within Turkey Location within Marmara
- Coordinates: 39°58′2″N 29°33′15″E
- Country: Turkey
- Province: Bursa
- District: İnegöl
- Population (2022): 317
- Time zone: UTC+3 (TRT)

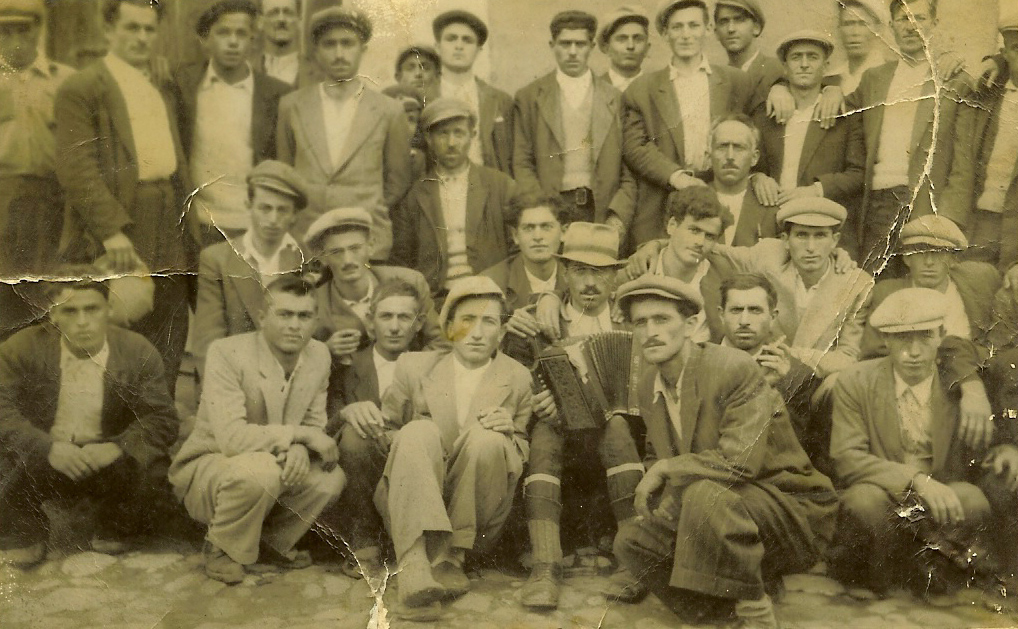
Young villagers, most of them farmers, before the first wave of emigration to Germany.

Hayriye is a neighbourhood in the municipality and district of İnegöl, Bursa Province, in the Marmara region of Turkey. Its population is 317 (2022). It is 13 km towards the east of the town of Inegöl.

== History ==
Hayriye was founded in 1877–78 by Georgian families of Muslim faith who migrated to Turkey from the border area between Georgia and Turkey (near Artvin) (situated in the province of Adjara in today's Republic of Georgia). They are Sunni Muslims of the Hanafi denomination. 250 people had left their native land, fleeing from the war between the Russian and Ottoman Empires. Haci Mehmet Efendi from the neighboring village of Maden led them to the place called Hayriye where they finally were given by the Turkish authorities the right to settle after clashes with Chechen refugees, who themselves had fled from persecution in the Russian Empire. (Haci Effendi had chosen the area of Hayriye because it resembled the conditions of the Georgian area the settlers came from.) The village is still almost exclusively inhabited by the descendants of the original Georgian families. Since the 1960s, many inhabitants of Hayriye went as migrant workers to Germany (most live in and around Bergneustadt, North Rhine-Westphalia) and Austria. They still keep their ancestral homes in Hayriye where they return to in the summer. (During the 1950s and 1960s the number of permanent residents was over 1,000; since the 1970s, the number steadily decreased due to emigration to Germany and Austria .) The older people still speak the Georgian language.

== See also ==
- Georgians in Turkey (Chveneburi)
