= Hilmiye, İnegöl =

Village in Turkey

Hilmiye
- Neighbourhood
- Country: Turkey
- Province: Bursa
- District: İnegöl
- Population (2022): 354
- Time zone: UTC+3 (TRT)

Hilmiye is a neighbourhood in the municipality and district of İnegöl, Bursa Province in Turkey. Its population is 354 (2022).
