= Tahtaköprü =

- Neighbourhood
- Location in Turkey Tahtaköprü (Marmara)
- Coordinates: 39°57′N 29°39′E
- Country: Turkey
- Province: Bursa
- District: İnegöl
- Elevation: 570 m (1,870 ft)
- Population (2022): 1,222
- Time zone: UTC+3 (TRT)
- Postal code: 16400
- Area code: 0224

Tahtaköprü (literally "Wooden bridge") is a neighbourhood of the municipality and district of İnegöl, Bursa Province, Turkey. Its population is 1,222 (2022). Before the 2013 reorganisation, it was a town (belde). It is 22 kilometres (14 mi) southeast of İnegöl and 95 kilometres (59 mi) east of Bursa.

The area around Tahtaköprü was always inhabited throughout the history. Hittites, Pergamon and the Byzantine Empire were among the states ruled over the area. Tahtaköprü was one of the early acquisitions of the rising Ottoman Empire. In 1886 Tahtaköprü hosted Muslim refugees from the territory annexed by Russia during Russo-Turkish War (1877-1878). Tahtaköprü was occupied three times by the Greek army; first on 6 January 1921, the second on 23 March 1921 and the third on 10 June 1921. But on 6 September 1922 Tahtaköprü was returned to Turkey. Furniture industry is one of the main sectors of Tahtaköprü economy. Farming, animal husbandry and forestry are among the other economic activities.
