= Küçükyenice, İnegöl =

Village in Turkey

Küçükyenice
- Neighbourhood
- Location in Turkey Küçükyenice (Marmara)
- Coordinates: 40.048°N 29.648°E
- Country: Turkey
- Province: Bursa
- District: İnegöl
- Population (2022): 901
- Time zone: UTC+3 (TRT)

Küçükyenice is a neighbourhood in the municipality and district of İnegöl, Bursa Province in Turkey. Its population is 901 (2022).
