= Villages of Turkey =

Second smallest settlement unit in Turkey

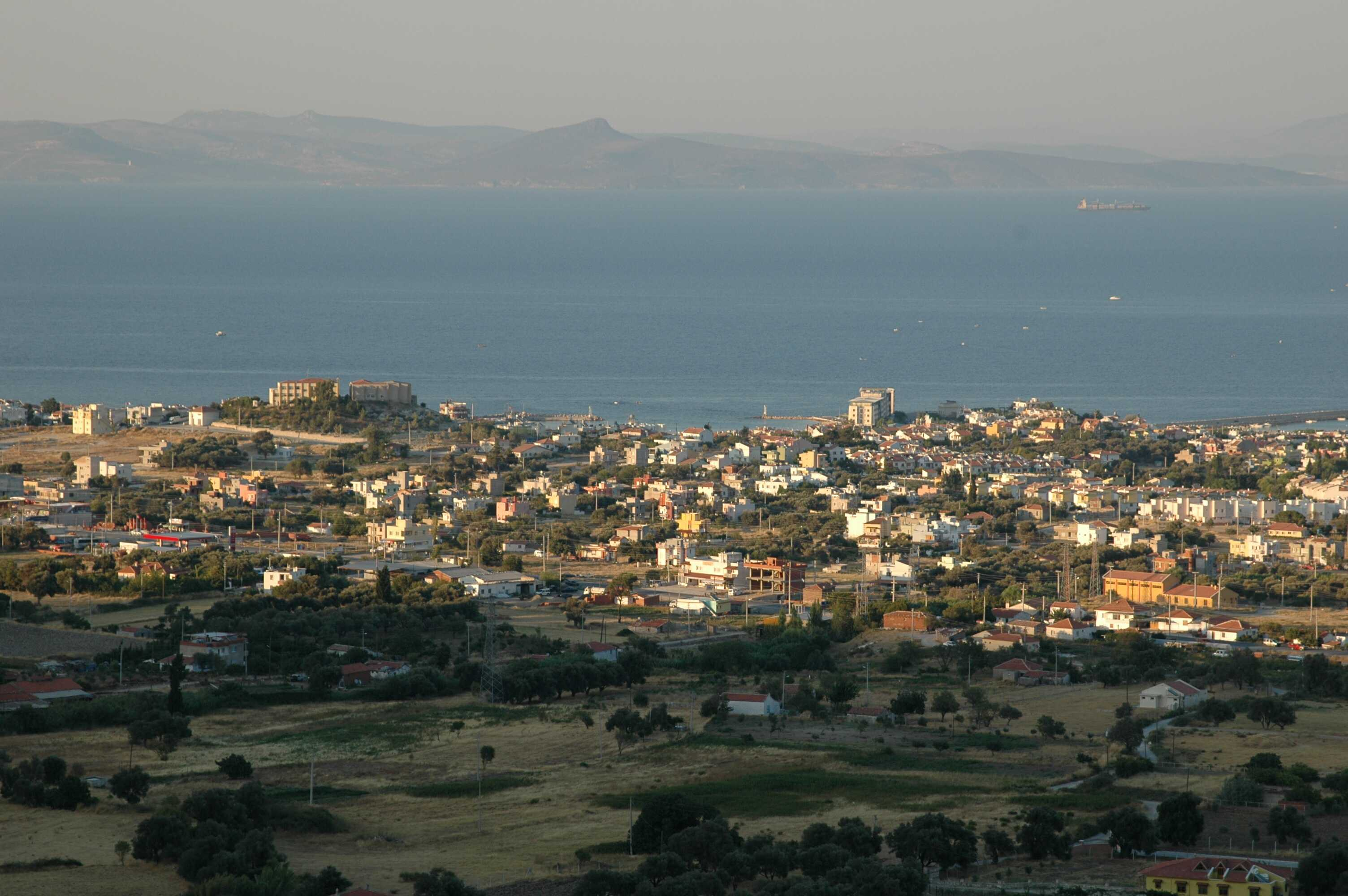
Mordoğan (Karaburun district of İzmir Province)

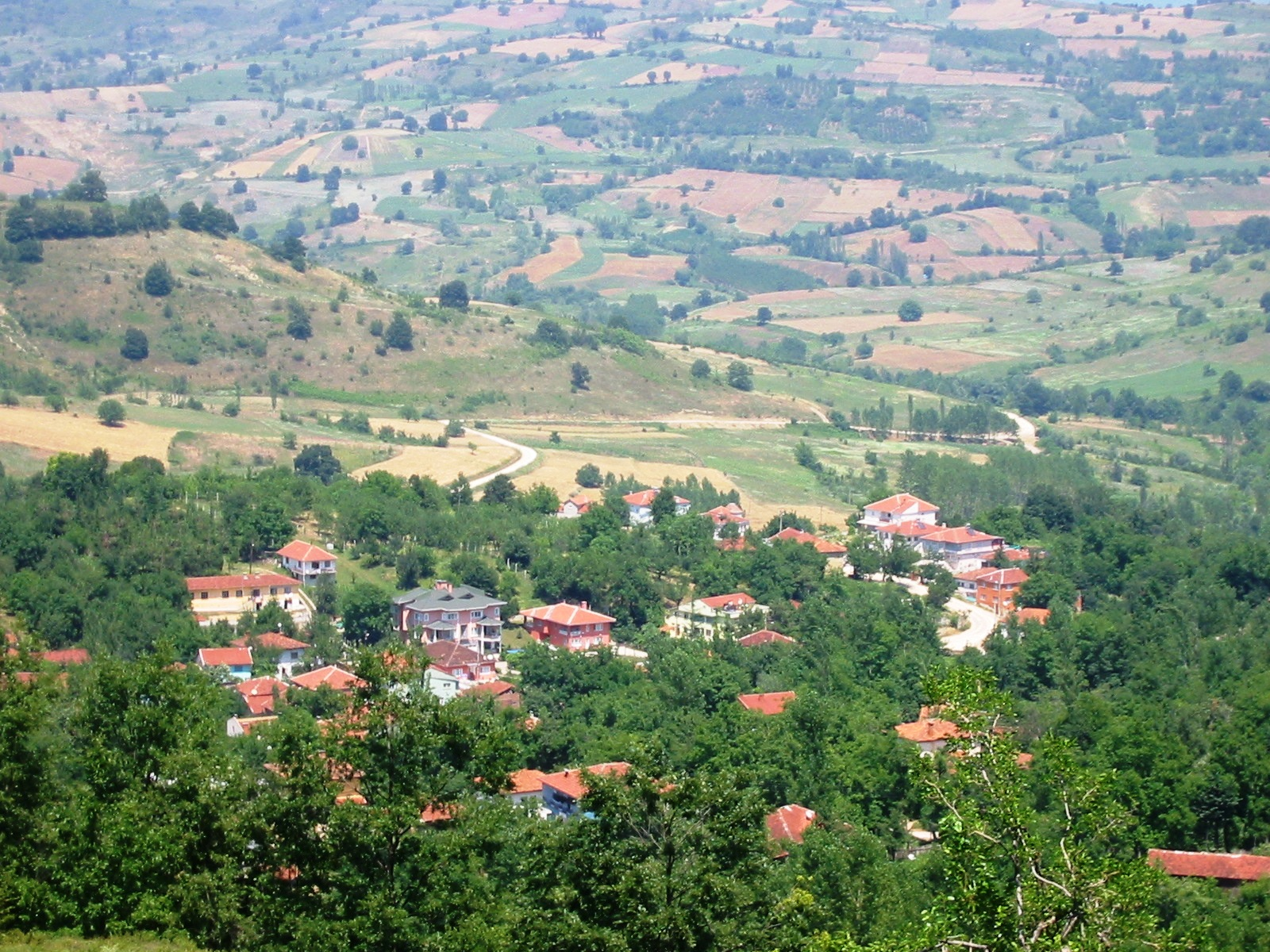
Hayriye (İnegöl district of Bursa Province)

A village (Turkish: köy, karye in the Ottoman era) is the second smallest settlement unit in Turkey.

The 51 regular provinces of Turkey and 30 province-level metropolitan municipalities are divided into districts.

A 2013 reform converted all 16,803 villages in the metropolitan municipalities, into neighborhoods (Turkish: mahalle) of the districts.

Remaining villages are in the rural areas of the districts in regular provinces, and have about 8.7% of the country's population. Each village or neighborhood elects a muhtar. Some more populous villages have been incorporated as towns (Turkish: belde), but in the others, the muhtar is responsible for all village services.

As of 2023, there are 18,277 villages and 32,261 neighbourhoods in Turkey.

== Abolished subdistricts ==
During the early years of the Turkish Republic, subdistricts called bucak had been established for the villages in remote areas. The center of the sub district was chosen as one of the villages. The last bucak were abolished in 2014.
