= Boğazköy =

Boğazköy can refer to the following places:

== In Turkey ==
- Boğazkale, a town and district in Çorum Province
  - Hattusa, the ancient Hittite site located near Boğazkale
- Boğazköy, Amasya
- Boğazköy, Bucak
- Boğazköy, Dicle
- Boğazköy, Ergani
- Boğazköy, Gercüş
- Boğazköy, İnegöl
- Boğazköy, Karacabey
- Boğazköy, Mustafakemalpaşa
- Boğazköy, Sarıyahşi

== Elsewhere ==
- Boğazköy, Cyprus, in Kyrenia District
- Boğazköy, the Turkish name for Cernavodă, Romania
