= Tombs of the Kings =

There are a number of sites known as the Tombs of the Kings:

- Tombs of the Kings (Paphos), Cyprus
- Tombs of the Kings (Jerusalem), East Jerusalem
- Tombs of the kings of Pontus, Amasya, Turkey

== See also ==
- Valley of the Kings, Egypt
