= Fındıklı =

Fındıklı (Turkish for "with hazelnuts" or "place with hazelnuts") may refer to:

- Fındıklı, Amasya, a village in Amasya Province, Turkey
- Fındıklı, Beyoğlu, a neighborhood in the Beyoğlu district of Istanbul, Turkey
- Fındıklı, Borçka, a village in Artvin Province, Turkey
- Fındıklı, Gelibolu
- Fındıklı, Gönen, a village
- Fındıklı, Kaynaşlı
- Fındıklı, Mecitözü
- Fındıklı, Ortaköy
- Fındıklı, Pozantı, a village in Adana Province, Turkey
- Fındıklı, Rize, a town and district of Rize Province, Turkey
- Fındıklı, Tercan
- Fındıklıçalı, Kahta, a village in Adıyaman Province, Turkey
