= Amasya Museum =

Coordinates: 40°38′58″N 35°49′29″E

- Amasya Müzesi
- Location of Amasya Museum in Turkey
- Established: 1958; 68 years ago
- Location: Mustafa Kemal Paşa Cad., Amasya, Turkey
- Type: Archaeology museum, Ethnographic museum
- Collections: Early Bronze Age, Hittites, Kingdom of Urartu Phrygians, Scythians, Hellenistic period, Roman Empire, Byzantine Empire, Ilkhanate, Seljuk Empire, Ottoman Empire
- Collection size: 5,574 archaeological; 17,287 ethnographic; 1,247 for study
- Owner: Ministry of Culture and Tourism

Amasya Museum, also known as Archaeological Museum of Amasya (Turkish: Amasya Müzesi or Amasya Arkeoloji Müzesi), is a national museum in Amasya, northern Turkey, exhibiting archaeological artifacts found in and around the city as well as ethnographic items related to the region's history of cultural life. Established in 1958, the museum owns nearly twenty-four thousand items for exhibition belonging to eleven historic civilizations.

== Background ==
In 1925, a museum depot was formed in two rooms of the madrasa within the Sultan Bayezid II Complex when a few archaeological artifacts and some Islamic era mummies were stored up together. The official establishment of the museum took place by June 1958. As more space became needed due to the increased number of items for exhibition, the inventory was transferred in 1962 to the 13th-century monumental Seljuk era-building at Gökmedrese Mosque. The museum was moved to its newly built current modern building on March 22, 1977. It was opened to the public on June 14, 1980, after rearrangement of the exhibition items in chronological order.

== Museum ==
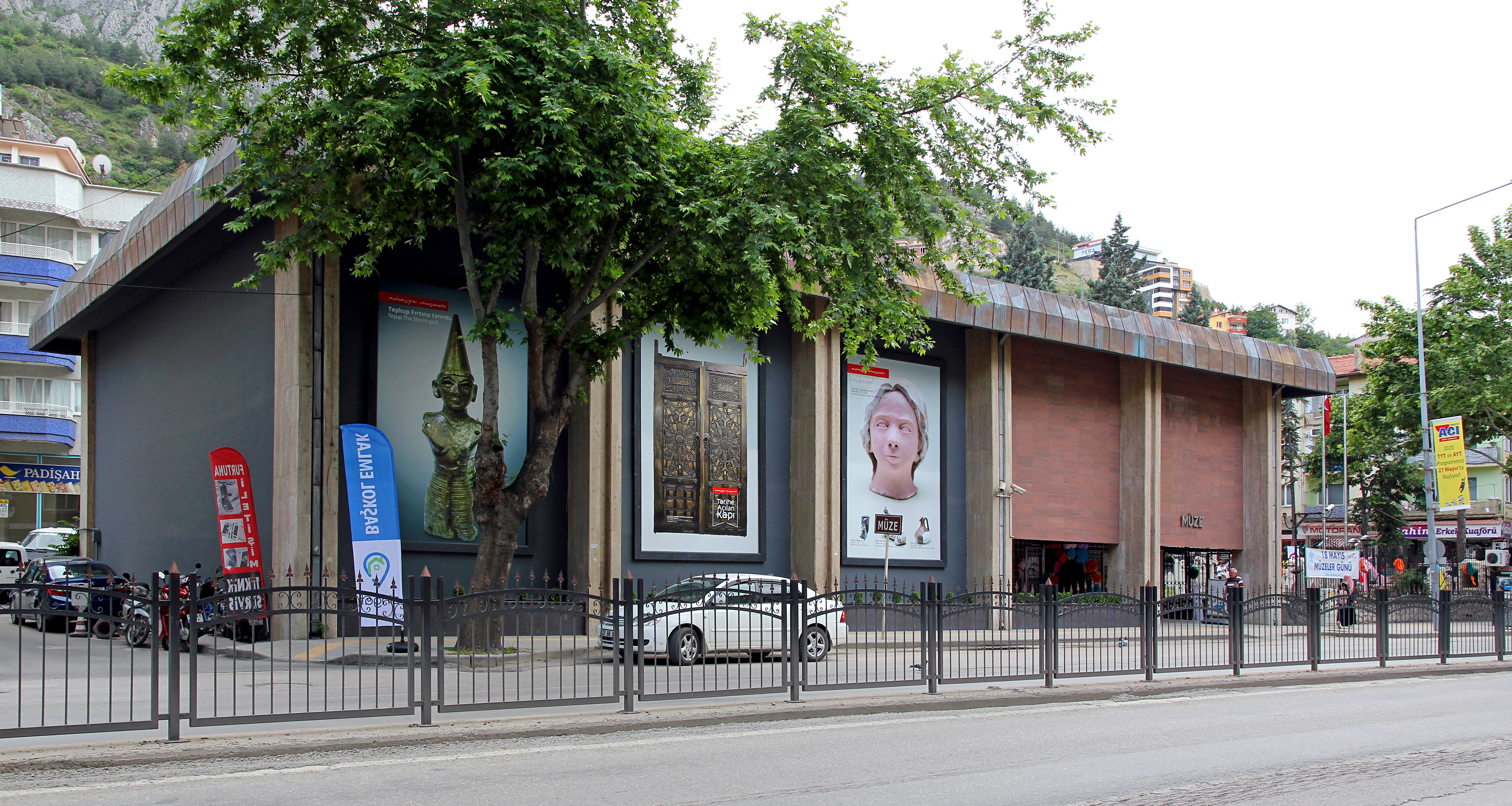
Amasya Museum building

The museum is housed in a three-story building. The basement contains storeroom, laboratory and service units. In the ground floor, a small exhibition room, a kiosk and a lounge is situated. The upper floor comprises two large exhibition halls containing archaeological artifacts and ethnographic items. In the museum's garden, stone artifacts and mummies from the Ilkhanate period inside the Tomb of Mesud I are on exhibition.

The museum has 5,574 archaeological and 17,287 ethnographic objects as well as 1,247 items for study purposes.

=== Ground floor ===
The exhibits in the ground floor include amphoras of the Roman and Byzantine eras found in a shipwreck off Bafra, three Roman-era terracotta and a Byzantine-era bronze sarcophagus, a Hellenistic period relief featuring Dionysus and son, a torso statue of a priest from the Roman era, original marble inscriptions of the Seljuk and Ottoman era mosques and madrasas, a wooden door leaf with figures from the Late Byzantine period, double-winged wooden doors of Gökmedrese Mosque from the Seljuk era and Mehmed Pasha Mosque from the Ottoman era. There are also carpets, prayer rugs and saddlebags on display, which were brought to the region by Azerbaijanis who immigrated during the Russo-Turkish War.

=== Upper floor - archaeological section ===
The archaeological section in the upper floor contains artifacts unearthed inat local archaeological excavations, including earthenware, bronze daggers and axes, needles, loom weights and seals of the Early Bronze Age (3500–2100 BC) and Hittites (1400–1200 BC), figurine of Hittite storm deity Teshub, best known as the Amasya figurine, acquired bronze bracelets and pots of Kingdom of Urartu (900–600 BC), libation bowls of Phrygians (850–600 BC), iron sword and diverse metallic fighting tools of a Scythian cavalry (6th century BC), dishes and kantharos from the Hellenistic period, tear catchers, glass perfume cups, bowls, terracotta kantharos, theatrical masks, bronze containers, various golden, silver and glass women's jewellery of the Roman era, Hellenistic and Roman oil lamps and bronze coins, copper coins of Byzantine, silver coins of Seljuk and golden coins of Ottoman period, and finally diverse Byzantine period (476-1453 AD) items.

=== Upper floor - ethnographic section ===
This museum's section exhibits copper-ware utensils such as kettles, washbowls, buckets, hand-basins and cooking pots used in the Ottoman households during the 19th century; various jewellery worn by Ottoman women; nacre-inlay wooden spoons, boxes, trunks and clogs from the Ottoman period; all types of Ottoman weapons; Seljuk and Ottoman ceramic plates and water jugs; astronomical tools like wooden astrolabes, compasses and globes; Ottoman bath objects such as bundles made of tinsel embroidery velvet and bath clothes; timekeeping instruments including silver and enamelled hunter-case pocket watches and wooden-case pendulum clocks; lighting devices like glass and ceramic kerosene lamps; Ottoman period tea, coffee and smoking utensils; thuribles; talismans; hand-written books of the Quran; writing utensils; lecterns; decree documents with Sultan's tughra, and colours, standards and guidons.

=== Open-air exhibition ===
In the garden to the west of the museum, large-sized stone artifacts are on display from the periods of Hittites, Hellenistic, Byzantine, Ilkhanate, Seljuk and Ottoman. These are Hittite gate lion statues, Hellenistic and Roman epigraphies, Ionic order and Corinthian order capitals, Roman sarcophagi made of marble and limestone, inscriptions and milestones, Byzantine steles and architectural elements as well as inscriptions of buildings, headstones, terracotta jars and mosque column capitals from the Ilkhanate, Seljuk and Ottoman periods.

Six mummies from the Ilkhanate period (1256–1335/1353) are on display inside the Tomb of Mesud I. This part of the museum is the most visited. The mummies were transferred here from two mosque graveyards in Amasya.

== Access ==
The museum is located on Mustafa Kemal Paşa Cad. in the city center. It is open every day from 8:30 to 19:00 local time (17:00 in winter months). The admission fee is ₺ 5.00 (approx. US$1.67).
