= Yeşilyenice =

- Neighbourhood
- Location in Turkey
- Coordinates: 40°41′N 35°57′E
- Country: Turkey
- Province: Amasya
- District: Amasya
- Municipality: Amasya
- Population (2021): 866
- Time zone: UTC+3 (TRT)

Yeşilyenice is a neighbourhood of the city Amasya, Amasya District, Amasya Province, Turkey. Its population is 866 (2021). Before the 2013 reorganisation, it was a town (belde).
