= Ali Rıza Özdarende =

Turkish politician

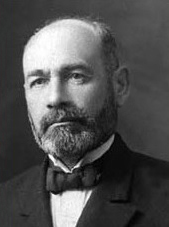

Member of the Grand National Assembly

Personal details
- Born: 1876 Amasya, Ottoman Empire
- Died: 1952 (aged 75–76)

Ali Rıza Özdarende (1876–1952) was a Turkish conservative politician.
