= Sabuncuoğlu Şerafeddin =

Ottoman surgeon and physician (1385–1468)

Şerafeddin Sabuncuoğlu
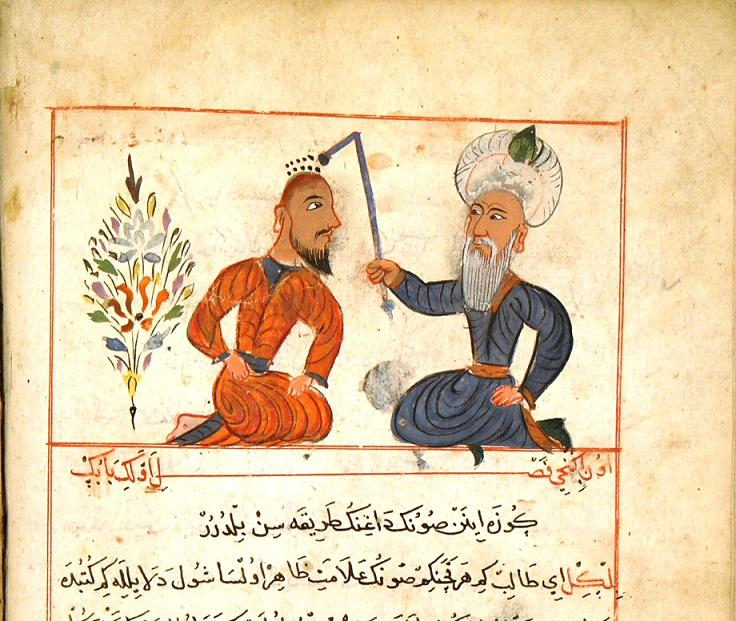
- Illustration from the Cerrahiyyetu'l-Haniyye, Şerafeddin Sabuncuoğlu 15th-century medicine book
- Born: 1385
- Died: 1468 (aged 82–83)
- Known for: Surgical atlas
- Scientific career
- Fields: Surgeon physician

Şerafeddin Sabuncuoğlu (1385–1468) (Ottoman Turkish: شرف‌الدّین صابونجی‌اوغلی) was a medieval Ottoman surgeon and physician. Şerafeddin Sabuncuoğlu started his medical interests at the age of 17. He would continue with this medical interest and practice in Amasya Dar-es Sifa Hospital until he died. Şerafeddin Sabuncuoğlu was the director of the Amasya Dar-es Sifa Hospital for almost 14 years.

== Biography ==
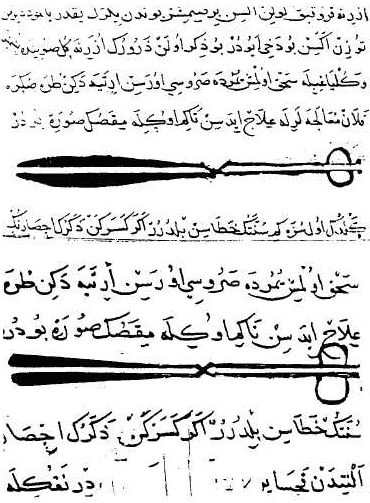
Text and illustration of two types of scissors for circumcision. From the Cerrahiyyetu'l-Haniyye

Şerafeddin Sabuncuoğlu lived during the 15th century in Amasya. During the early period of the Ottoman Empire, Amasya was a center of commerce, culture, and arts. During this period, Serafeddin Sabuncuoglu practiced medicine in Amasya Hospital, which was built in 1308.

Sabuncuoğlu was the author of the Cerrahiyyetu'l-Haniyye (Imperial Surgery), the first illustrated surgical atlas, and the Mücerrebname (On Attemption).

Sabuncuoğlu authored Imperial Surgery, the first illustrated Turkish-written medical textbook, in 1465 at the age of 80. Imperial Surgery is divided into three chapters dealing with 191 topics in the course of 412 pages. Three original handwritten copies survive, two in Sabuncuoglu's own hand; each copy is slightly different and none is complete. The originals are housed in Istanbul's Fatih Millet Library, the Capa Medical History Department of Istanbul University, and in the Bibliothèque Nationale in Paris. Sabuncuoğlu 's Imperial Surgery was the first surgical atlas and the last major medical encyclopedia from the Islamic world. Though his work was largely based on Abu al-Qasim al-Zahrawi's Al-Tasrif, Sabuncuoğlu introduced many innovations of his own. Female surgeons were also illustrated for the first time in the Imperial Surgery. One of the surgical techniques described by Sabuncuoğlu was the ligating of the temporal artery for migraine.

== Cerrahiyyet'u¨l Haniye (Imperial Surgery) ==
Cerrahiyyet’u¨l Haniye (Imperial Surgery) was Şerafeddin Sabuncuoğlu's most important book for medicine out of his known seven books. Cerrahiyyet’u¨l Haniye was rediscovered by the historian Süheyl Ünver in 1939. This book was then studied in 1992 by Ilter Uzel and then translated into modern Turkish, English, and Arabic. In Şerafeddin Sabuncuoğlu's medical textbook, Cerrahiyyet’u¨l Haniye, the descriptions of the diagnosis, classifications, and techniques used are explained in detail in the Turkish language. Cerrahiyyet’u¨l Haniye was written in rhyme and meter in describing the different treatments, which was common practice for writers of the time. This book was mostly a modification and compilation of other medical techniques from Al-Zahrawi, but Sabuncuoğlu did contribute to unique ideas in this textbook. These include three new chapter that incorporate 134 surgical interventions and 156 surgical instruments. These three chapters discussed cauterization treatments, surgical procedures, fractures and dislocations, and cancer related issues. Şerafeddin Sabuncuoğlu made sure to describe surgical complications and cite any knowledge he attained from others. When Cerrahiyyet’u¨l Haniye was completed, it was presented to the Ottoman emperor Sultan Mehmet II. Cerrahiyyet’u¨l Haniye shows that Şerafeddin Sabuncuoğlu believed that women had an important role as physicians. Female surgeons were depicted in his illustrations involving gynecology. The female surgeons were called “tabiba” in the book. These gynecology illustrations were also important in portraying the correct position of the patient.

In these treatments, Şerafeddin Sabuncuoğlu used his own observations from experimenting with animals to develop new treatments. Successful treatments were then performed on humans. Şerafeddin Sabuncuoğlu would only transcribe and illustrate the treatments after he completed the treatments himself. He would even test therapeutic treatments on himself before applying them on patients. Şerafeddin Sabuncuoğlu was also aware of sepsis. In order to prevent the spread of a pathogen, he would wear a surgical attire that involved wine and olive oil as antiseptics. In one such treatment, Şerafeddin Sabuncuoğlu discussed a breast cancer treatment in which the suggested treatment was to surgically remove the small cancers in their early stage. Many of these treatments in Cerrahiyyet’u¨l Haniye have illustrations accompanied next to them, which ensure that the intended audience are able to follow the treatment correctly. Every illustration contains a distinct physician and patient along with the tools used in the treatment.

In Şerafeddin Sabuncuoğlu treatment of epilepsy, he used the technique of skull cauterization as a way of purifying the body from evil spirits. This demonstrates the religious and incomplete understanding of some of the medical issues that were prevalent in the past. This was evident in the recovery phase of his epilepsy treatment where he states, “you’ll have to give the patient the following foods to enable the dehydration in order that the patient can recover, with the permission of Allah.” Şerafeddin Sabuncuoğlu recommended using a non-invasive and less intense treatment first before moving on to a stronger treatment. In his epilepsy treatment, herbal mixtures were recommended to be used first, then a cauterization on the forehead could be used if the herbal mixtures did not work. Şerafeddin Sabuncuoğlu was also careful in not over-treating a patient. In Şerafeddin Sabuncuoğlu's description and diagnosis of spinal dislocations, he mentions how swelling after the treatment is normal and that repeating the treatment could lead to the death of the patient.

== Medical Innovations ==
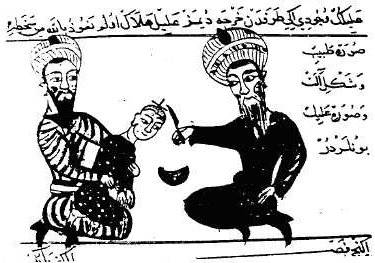
Hydrocephalus Sabuncuoğlu

Serafeddin Sabuncuoglu was one of the first to describe hydrocephalic drainage techniques in children. However, Şerafeddin Sabuncuoğlu did not have specific descriptions and understanding of hydrocephalus. It was after 150 years from Şerafeddin Sabuncuoğlu's initial description and diagnosis that Marco Aurelio Severino would officially describe and classify this procedure. He also pioneered the usage of a wooden splint after hand surgery. An important observation that Şerafeddin Sabuncuoğlu made in Cerrahiyyet’u¨l Haniye was that a fast delivery of a baby can occur if the patient holds their breath and exerts a strong force. He recommended herbal drugs that would cause the patient to sneeze in order to exert a stronger force. Şerafeddin Sabuncuoğlu also describes complications that occur during pregnancy and how to prevent the death of the mother. His main techniques involve the insertion of a hook on a dead fetus to extract the baby out of the mother. Şerafeddin Sabuncuoğlu also suggested crushing the fetus’ skull with the “Mi dah” instrument if the hydrocephaly was causing the obstruction.

== See also ==
- Al-Zahrawi
- Amirdovlat of Amasia
