= Amasya Castle =

Castle in Amasya, northern Turkey

- Amasya, Turkey
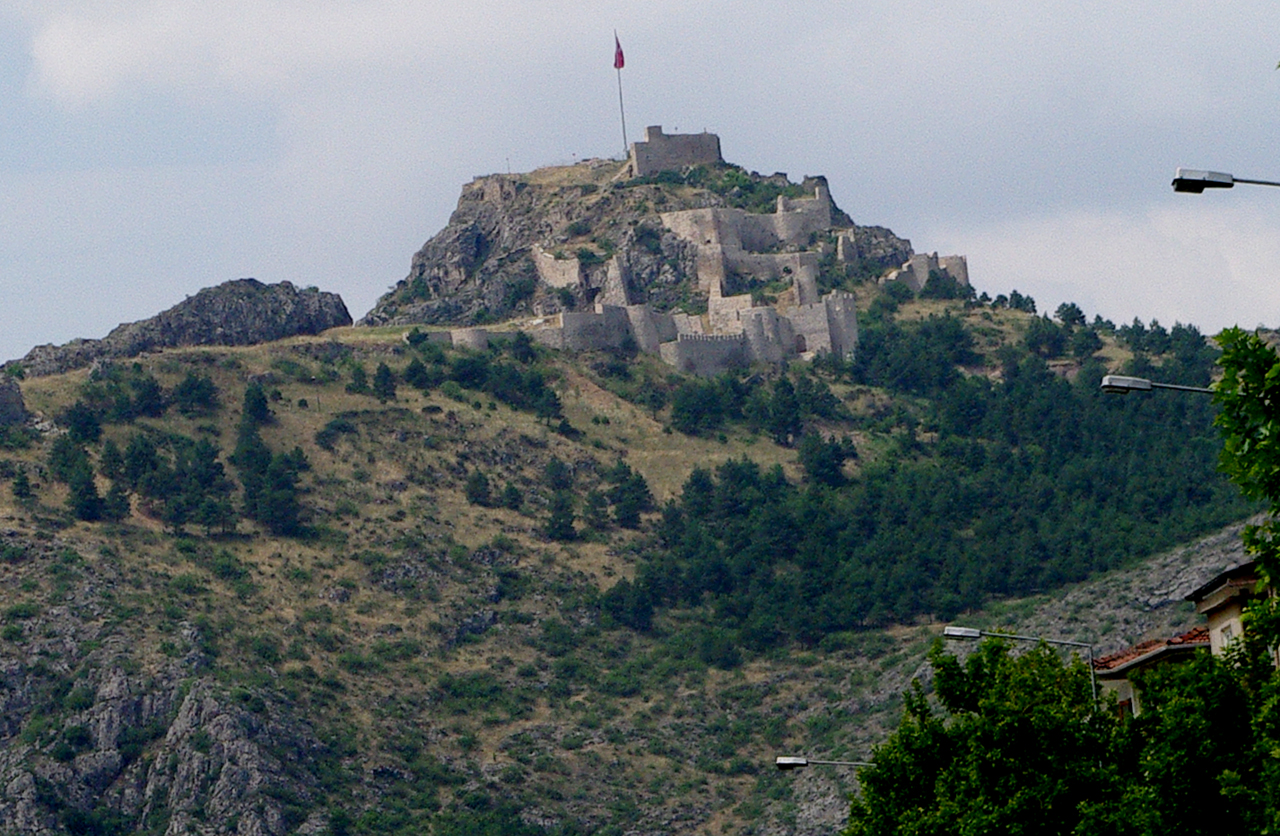
- Amasya Castle

Site information
- Type: Fortress
- Open to the public: Yes

Location
- Location of Amasya Castle in Turkey
- Coordinates: 40.65528°N 35.82667°E

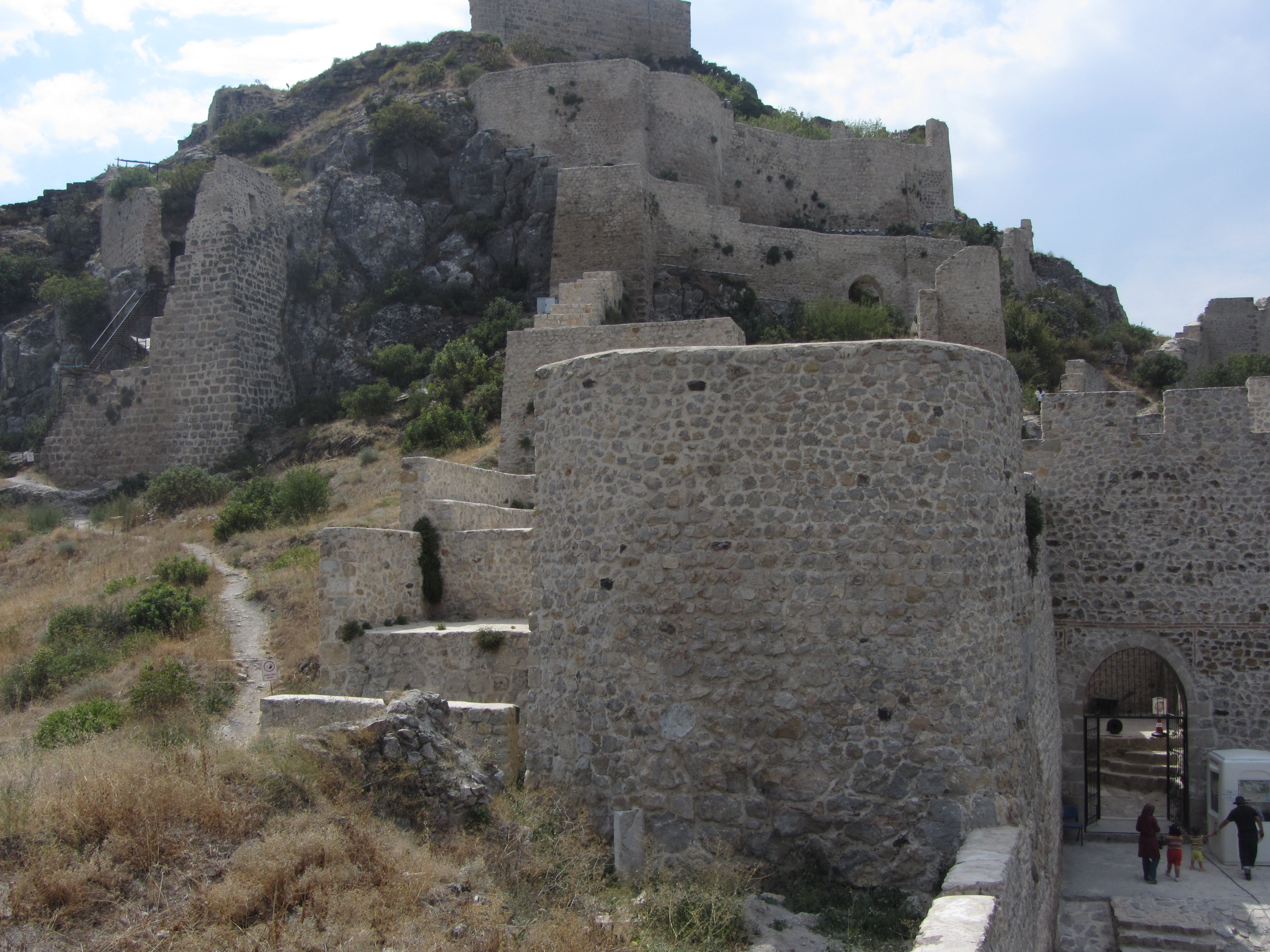
A view from Amasya Castle.

Amasya Castle (Turkish: Amasya Kalesi), a.k.a. Harşene Castle, is a fortress located in Amasya, northern Turkey.

The castle is located north of Amasya and the river Yeşilırmak on the steep rocks of Mount Harşena.

== History ==
The castle was attacked, ruined, and changed hands many times over the course of the Persian, Roman, Pontic and Byzantine eras, and was restored each time. The castle was severely ruined during the battles between the Romans and Pontics. It was substantially restored after the 1075 conquest of Amasya by the Danishmends, an Oghuz Turk dynasty. It remained in use until the 18th century when it lost its military importance.

While fleeing the invading troops of Timur in the first years of the 15th century, Ottoman then-şehzade Çelebi Mehmed took refuge in Amasya Castle.

== Description ==
The castle has four gates, named Helkıs, Saray, Maydonos and Meydan. It includes dungeons, cisterns, wells and galleried monumental rock-tombs.

The castle has eight-level defensive emplacements outside the castle down to the banks of Yeşilırmak River. The top-level fortification is constructed in ashlar masonry while the defensive walls – two kilometres (1.2 mi) in length – are made of rubble masonry.

A system of rock-carved cisterns and connecting tunnels is situated in the middle of the castle. Several steep stair-tunnels descend from exterior portals on the fortress hillsides to reach the enclosed wells, cisterns, and tombs below. One cistern, the "Cilanbolu", is reached by a tunnel stairway that descends 186 metres (610 ft). This tunnel's diameter is 8 m (26 ft) and it contains 150 steps leading downward. When built, the tunnel had a greater number: the steps at the tunnel's lower reaches have not survived. The Cilanbolu Cistern itself is 300 metres (980 ft) long.

== Other landmarks ==
Below the castle stand the ruins of a bastion and a mosque. On the southern hillside, there are ruins of the Kızlar Sarayı (lit. 'Maidens' Palace'), used during the Ottoman period.

At about 20–25 m (66–82 ft) height, in a sheer rock face, there are 18 large and small tombs of Pontic kings, dating to the 3rd century BC and carved into the limestone cliff.

At about 800 m (2,600 ft) of the ancient fortress walls along the Yeşilırmak River, typical Amasya houses, hamams and mosques were built.
