= Yeniköy, Amasya =

Yeniköy
- Neighbourhood
- Location in Turkey
- Coordinates: 40°40′34″N 35°52′58″E
- Country: Turkey
- Province: Amasya
- District: Amasya
- Municipality: Amasya
- Population (2021): 422
- Time zone: UTC+3 (TRT)

Yeniköy (formerly: Sarılar) is a neighbourhood of the city Amasya, Amasya District, Amasya Province, Turkey. Its population is 422 (2021).
