= Basil of Amasea =

Saint Basil of Amasea
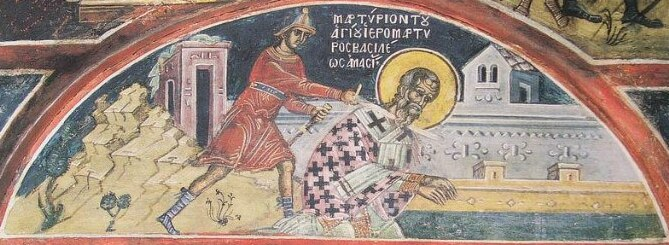
- Fresco of Saint Basil's martyrdom from Dionysiou Monastery

Bishop of Amasea
- Born: 3rd century AD
- Died: 322 AD; Nicomedia, Bithynia
- Venerated in: Roman Catholic Church; Eastern Orthodox Church
- Major shrine: Docheiariou Monastery, Mount Athos (skull); Monastery of Iviron, Mount Athos (hands)
- Feast: April 26 (Roman Catholic, Eastern Orthodox)

Basil of Amasea (Basileus or Basilius) was a fourth-century Christian bishop and martyr. In Jerome's Latin version of the Chronicle of Eusebius, the statement occurs under the 275th Olympiad (321–324) that Basileus, Bishop of Amasea in Pontus, suffered martyrdom in the reign of Licinius. Among the signatures of the bishops who attended the Council of Ancyra and Council of Neo-Caesarea (314) is to be found the name of Basileus of Amasea. Eusebius also relates that in the time of Licinius Christians were treated with great cruelty, especially in Amasea and the other cities of Pontus, and that, in particular, the governor inflicted upon several bishops the ordinary punishments of evildoers.

Athanasius mentions Basileus of Pontus among the bishops of the early part of the fourth century who held firmly to the like substance of the Son with the Father; the reference is evidently to the martyr-bishop of Amasea. The statement of Philostorgius, that Basileus attended the Council of Nicaea, cannot be quoted against this proof of the martyrdom of Basileus under Licinius, as there is evidently a mistake in what Philostorgius says; among the signatures at the Council of Nicaea appears that of Eutychianus as Bishop of Amasea.

The Acts of the martyrdom of Basileus, supposedly written by an eyewitness, a presbyter named Johannes, are not authentic and the narrative is entirely legendary.

The feast of Basileus falls on 26 April, on which date it occurs both in the Greek synaxaria and menaion and in the Roman martyrology.
