= Amirdovlat of Amasia =

15th-century Armenian physician and writer

Amirdovlat Amasiatsi
- Ամիրդովլաթ Ամասիացի
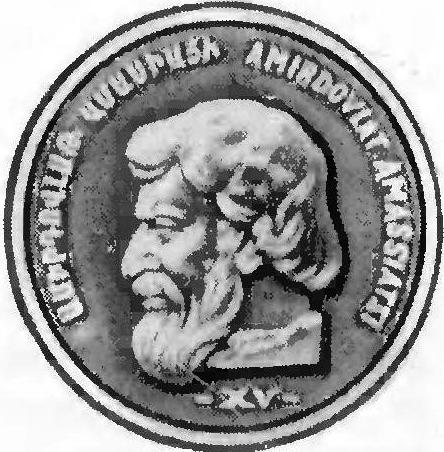
- Born: c. 1420; Amasia
- Died: December 8, 1496; Amasia or Bursa
- Occupations: Physician and Writer
- Writing career
- Notable works: The Lore of Medicine; Akhrabadin; The Benefits of Medicine; Folk Medicine; Useless for Ignoramuses

Amirdovlat Amasiatsi (Armenian: Ամիրդովլաթ Ամասիացի; c. 1420–1496), also called Amirdovlat of Amasia, was a 15th-century Armenian physician and writer. He wrote several works on medicine and science, some aimed at professional audiences and some at ordinary people. All his works were written in Middle Armenian, making them accessible to ordinary readers and not just to scholars.

Amirdovlat was born in Amasia around 1420. He travelled extensively. He wrote the majority of his works in Constantinople, where he was chief physician to Mehmed II.

He died in Amasia or Bursa on December 8, 1496.

== Chronology ==
In Amirdovlat's biography, Stella A. Vardanyan gives the following chronology of his life:

Between 1420 and 1430: born in Amasia

1450s: Attended Armenian schools in Amasia and Sebastia. Wandered as a travelling physician in Asia and Iran collecting plant samples

End of 1450s: Moved to Constantinople by sea. Further studies of medicinal arts, natural sciences and philosophy.

1460s: Selected as a chief physician to Mehmed II, and received an honorary title of chief physician-ophthalmologist. Afterwards he had ten years of exile and wanderings around Balkan countries.

1470s: Returned to Constantinople, regained his position of a chief physician to Mehmed II, enjoying his confidence until the ruler's death in 1481.

1480s: Returned to his motherland upon the invitation of the son of Mehmed II, Ahmed, who became a ruler of Amasia.

1490: Journeyed to the city of Bursa for treatment with mineral waters.

1496, December 8: Died in Amasia (though other sources suggest Bursa).

== Main works ==
Vardanyan also lists his major works:

1459: The Lore of Medicine and the first Akhrabadin (an extensive work on pharmacology), manuscript 8871 in the Matenadaran in Yerevan, Armenia

1466—1469: His major work on clinical medicine, The Benefits of Medicine, written in the city of Phillipopolis, now Plovdiv, in Bulgaria.

1474: Folk Medicine, with elements of magic medicine and astrology.

1481: The second Akhrabadin.

1478-1492: Useless for Ignoramuses, his major compendium of over 3000 plants and plant names, with their medical uses.

=== Gallery ===
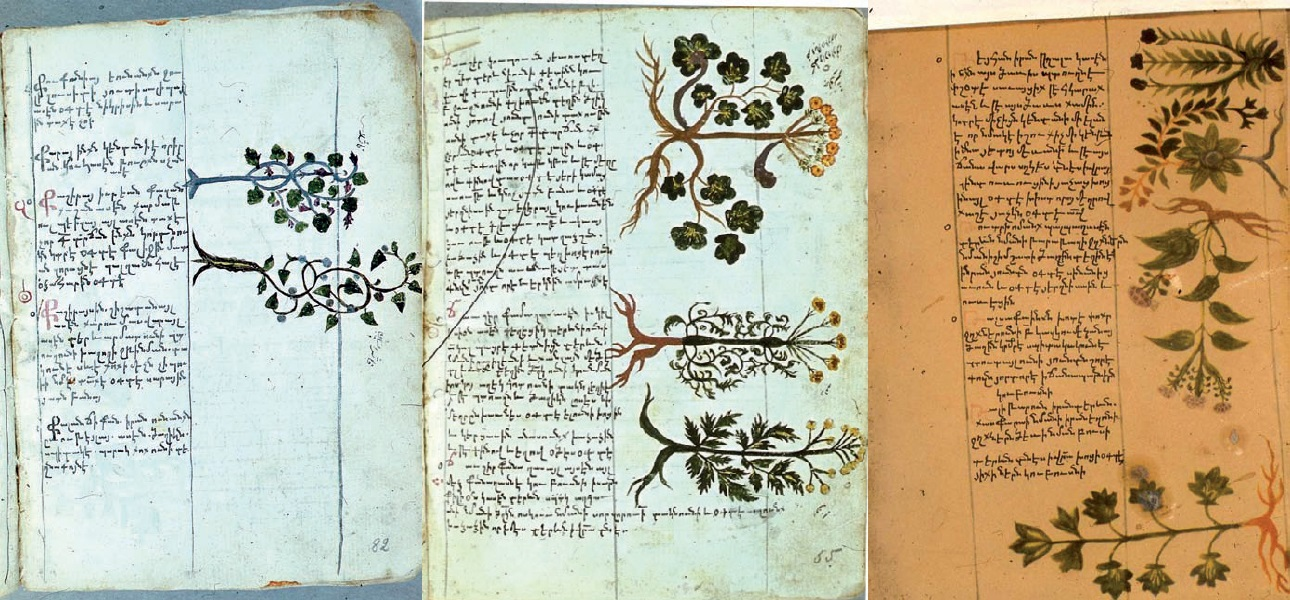
Pages from the Illustrated Dictionary of Simple Medicinal Substances

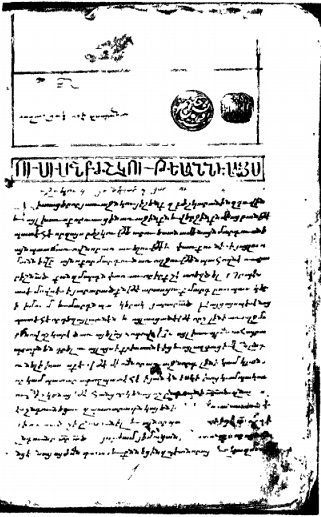
Title page of the author's manuscript “Teaching of Medicine”

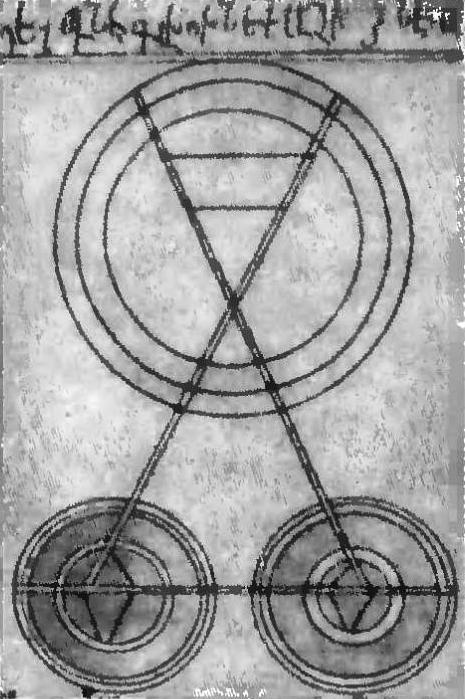
Illustration of the optic nerves from the "Benefits of Medicine" manuscript

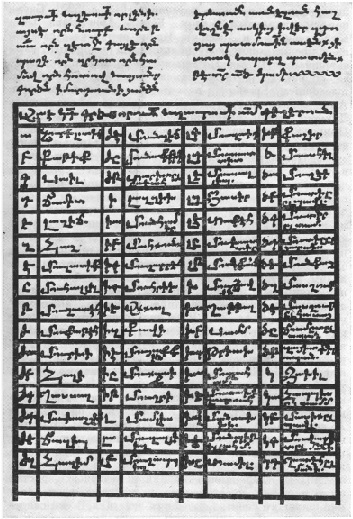
Classification of medicinal properties according to Amirdovlat

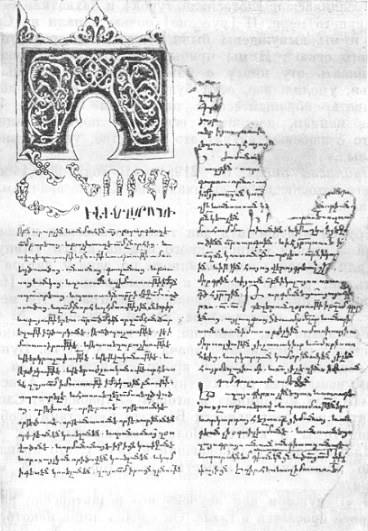
Title page of the book “Unnecessary for the Ignorant” (manuscript of 1626)

== See also ==
- Şerafeddin Sabuncuoğlu
