= Boğazköy, Amasya =

Boğazköy
- Neighbourhood
- Location in Turkey
- Coordinates: 40.7311°N 35.7763°E
- Country: Turkey
- Province: Amasya
- District: Amasya
- Municipality: Amasya
- Population (2021): 682
- Time zone: UTC+3 (TRT)

Boğazköy is a neighbourhood of the city Amasya, Amasya District, Amasya Province, Turkey. Its population is 682 (2021).
