= Tombs of the kings of Pontus =

Tombs in Turkey

Tombs of the kings of Pontus Kral Kaya Mezarları
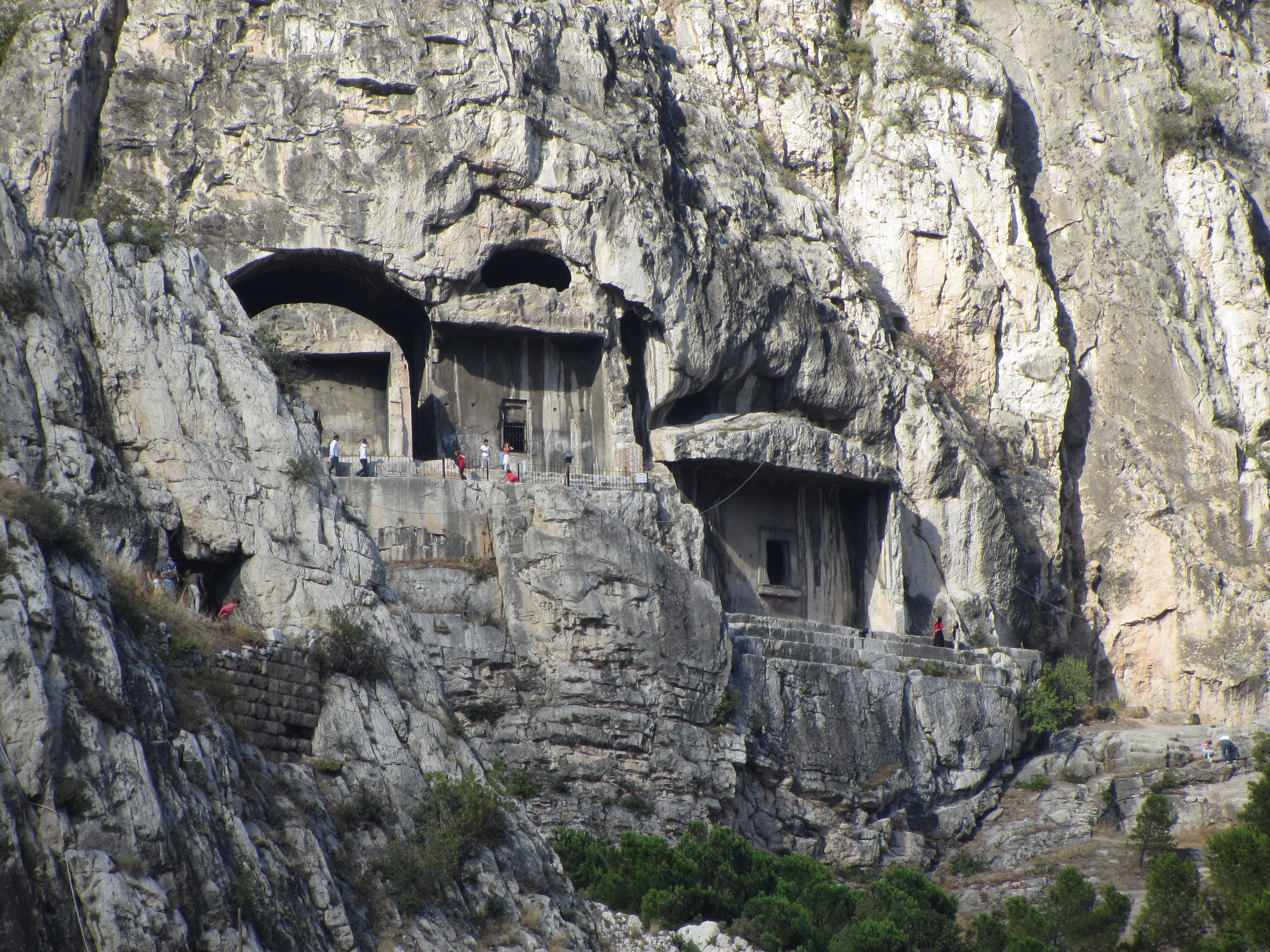
- A view of the rock-tombs of the Pontic kings
- Interactive map of Tombs of the kings of Pontus; Kral Kaya Mezarları

Details
- Location: Amasya
- Country: Turkey
- Coordinates: 40°39′12″N 35°49′49″E

The Tombs of the kings of Pontus (Turkish: Kral Kaya Mezarları), located in Amasya, northern Turkey, are rock-carved tombs of different sizes, forming the royal necropolis of the Pontic kings.

The site was added to the tentative list in the cultural category of UNESCO World Heritage Site on April 13, 2014.

The royal necropolis is located on the southern hillside of the 272 m (892 ft)-high Mount Harşena north of the city Amasya and the river Yeşilırmak. The monumental king tombs are carved in limestone rock formation after Mithridates I (reigned 281–266 BC) established the Kingdom of Pontus and made Amaseia (modern Amasya) the capital city. The tombs contain big stone grave chambers inside. The area is called "Valley of the Kings" in respect to the kingdom's size as the largest in northern Anatolia and its glorious past for hundreds of years during the Hellenistic period.

Five king tombs are situated in the Maidens' Palace area and belong to Mithridates I (died 266 BC), Ariobarzanes (died 250 BC), Mithridates II (died c. 210 BC), Mithridates III (died c. 190 BC) and Pharnaces I (c. 155 BC). There are nine more rock-tombs inside the Amasya Fortress on the slope of the Mt. Harşena. The total number of rock-carved royal tombs around the city amounts to 21.

The rock tombs are 8 to 15 m (26 to 49 ft) high. Three of the group of five tombs are reached by two separate staircases cut into the rock, and the other two tombs by a tunnel with steps. The grave chambers inside each of the five tombs are accessible only by a ladder due to their high position of the entrance. Three of the tombs have columns in the facade, one tomb with six and the other two tombs have four columns. The other two tombs without columns have rounded tops. The largest tomb, which is known to belong to Pharnaces I, has dimensions of 15 m × 8 m × 6 m (49 ft × 26 ft × 20 ft). An inscription is carved above the rock-tomb, which reads as "the phrourarch (commander of the castle) Metrodorus dedicated an altar and a flower-bed for the king Pharnaces I to the gods".

== See also ==
- Mithridatic dynasty
- List of colossal sculptures in situ
