= Fındıklı, Amasya =

Fındıklı
- Neighbourhood
- Country: Turkey
- Province: Amasya
- District: Amasya
- Municipality: Amasya
- Population (2021): 524
- Time zone: UTC+3 (TRT)

Fındıklı is a neighbourhood of the city Amasya, Amasya District, Amasya Province, Turkey. Its population is 524 (2021).
