= Boğazköy, Cyprus =

Boğazköy Μπογάζι (Greek) Boğazköy (Turkish)
- Location within Cyprus
- Coordinates: 35°17′29″N 33°17′01″E
- Country: Cyprus
  - District: Kyrenia District
- Country (controlled by): Northern Cyprus
  - District: Girne District

Population (2011)
  - Total: 1,943

Boğazköy or simply Boğaz (Greek: Μπογάζι) is a village east of Agirda in Cyprus. It was established in the 1960s as a Turkish Cypriot village. De facto, Boğazköy is under the control of Northern Cyprus.
