= Mining in Tajikistan =

Overview of mining industry in Tajikistan

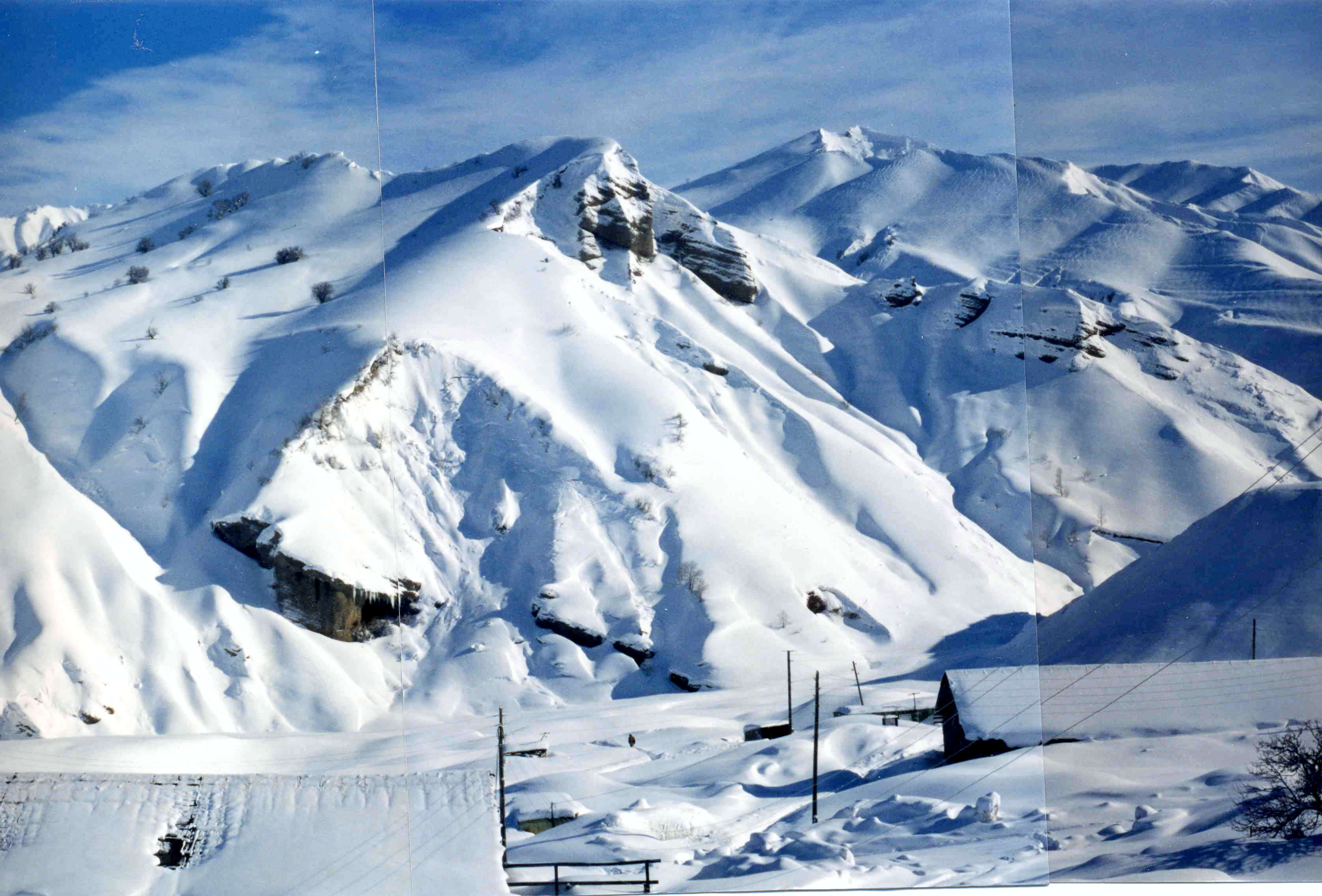
Mine near Darwaz, Tajikistan.

Tajikistan has rich deposits of gold, silver, and antimony. The largest silver deposits are in Sughd Province, where Tajikistan's largest gold mining operation is also located. Russia's Norilsk nickel company has explored a large new silver deposit at Bolshoy Kanimansur. More than 400 mineral deposits of some 70 different minerals have been discovered in Tajikistan, including strontium, tungsten, molybdenum, bismuth, salt, lead, zinc, fluorspar, and mercury. These minerals have been found suitable for mining. Uranium, an important mineral in the Soviet era, remains in some quantity but is no longer being extracted. The Tajikistan Aluminium Company (TALCO), an aluminium smelter, is the country's only large-scale production enterprise in the mining sector. Tajikistan hosts the annual Mining World Tajikistan, an international exhibition on mining in Dushanbe.

== History ==
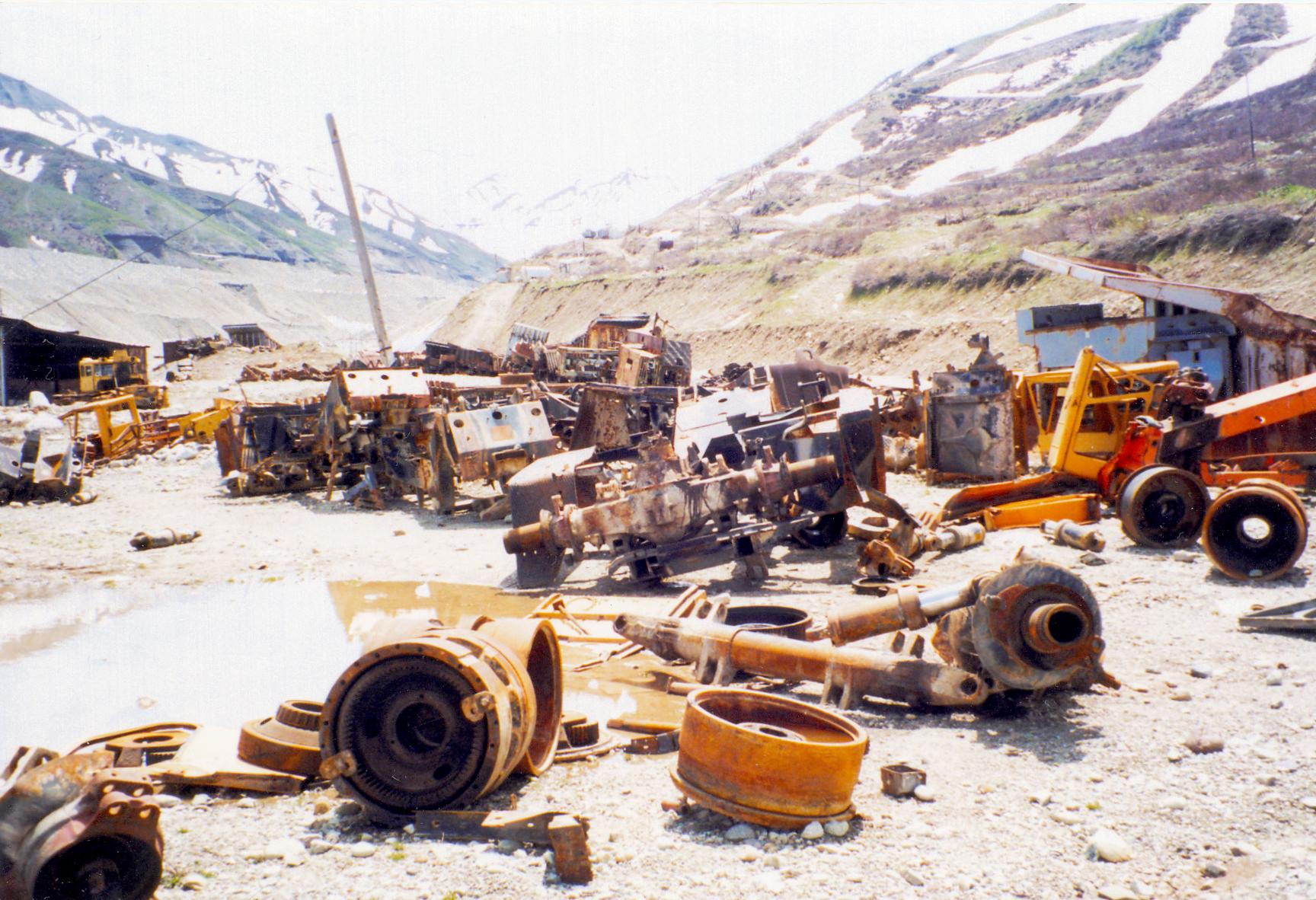
Mine equipment destroyed during the civil war in Tajikistan

The mining industry reached a notable level in the 9th–11th centuries, visible by ancient mining openings and metallurgical operations. These are evident in the Karamazar Mountains' Mansura mine, in the Kondara Ore Gorge, the Koninukra Silver Mine, Pamir, Darvaza, Kukhilal, and the Lyadzhvardara Lazurite Gorge. The archaeologist Mikhail Evgenievich Masson explored early mining sites in the eastern Tajikistan mountains.

Rare metals were not mined in Tajikistan before the World War II. The output of concentrates of rare metals in 1943, however, exceeded that of 1941 by sixty times, and that of 1942 by ten times.

No copper, molybdenum, tungsten, or zinc has been produced in recent years and mining activity since the 1990s has been severely disrupted due to civil war and political conflict. Mineral exports contribute substantially to the national economy of Tajikistan. According to the 2008 statistics of the World Bank, aluminium contributed about 50% to the national exchequer, with aluminium and cotton accounting for 9% of the gross domestic product.

== Minerals ==
=== Gold ===
Gold mining in Tajikistan is significant to the world mineral market. According to estimates from the Tajik Academy of Sciences, gold deposits are estimated at 429.3 tonnes. Tajikistan's largest gold mining operation is located in Sughd Province, with most gold being mined southeast of Gharm, in the Pamir Mountains, in the Yakhsu Valley, Chkalovsk and Jilau. It has taken off since independence from Russia with 2,700 kilograms (6,000 lb) of gold mined in 2000 compared to 1,100 in 1996. The Darvaz joint venture, in the Hatlon region of Eastern Tajikistan, did exploit the gold from 1997 to 1999, producing 110 kilograms (kg) of gold in 1997. However, operational problems arose following damage to the placer mining operation that took place during hostilities in the area in December 1996. Mills and the living quarters at the facility were damaged as result of the hostilities. As of 2011, Tajikistan produces up to 1.3–1.5 tonnes of gold annually, with a significant investment from China, with Zijin Mining working in the country. In January 2011, according to geologist Azim Ibrokhim, two massive gold deposits were discovered, one in the centre of the country contains 118 tonnes and the other in the north, which is believed to have 59 tonnes of gold. Tajikistan plans to produce 2,441 kg of gold by the end of the year 2012.

=== Silver ===
Proven silver reserves at Big Kon-i Mansur (کلان کان منصور) were determined during the Soviet era at about 50,000 tonnes, according to Tajikistan's Main Directorate of Geology (MDG). That total equals about 49g of silver per tonne of ore. The same tonne contains 480g of lead and 380g of zinc. The deposit has one billion tonnes of ore. The silver deposit is the world's second largest, according to the Tajik government. The world's most productive silver mine is Cannington in Australia. However, Soviet-era projections took only the most conservative estimates into account, geologists say; the ore could be richer than the Soviet estimates.

=== Aluminium ===
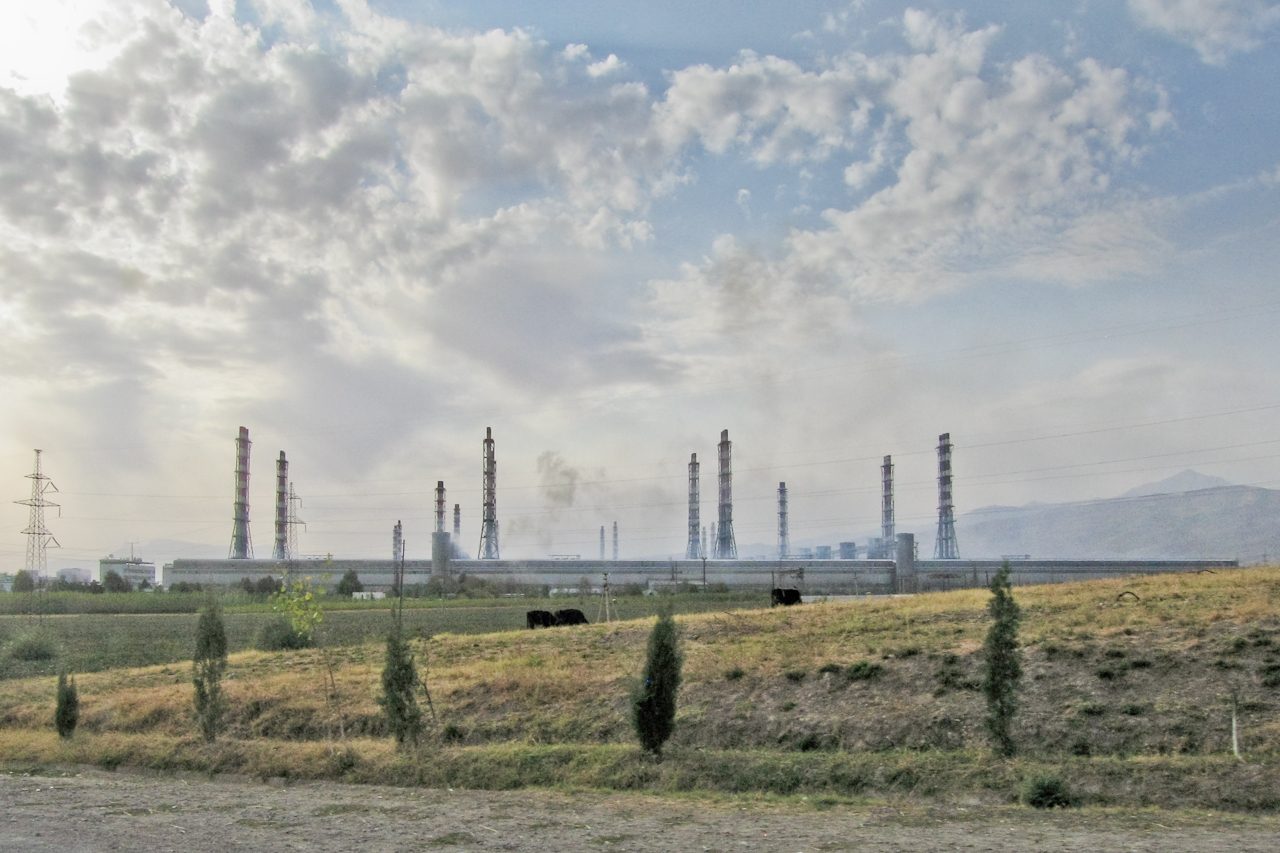
The TALCO plant in Tursunzade

The Tajikistan Aluminium Company (TALCO; previously TadAZ, "Tajikistan Aluminium Smelter"), an aluminium smelter, is Tajikistan's only large-scale production enterprise in the mining sector, and runs one of the world's largest aluminium manufacturing plants, located in Tursunzade, in the country's western area. Its production capacity is reported to be 517,000 t/year (accounting for consumption of 40% of electrical energy generated in the country) and most of it is exported with only about 5000 t/year consumed within the country. As of 2006, the company was responsible for some 416,000 tonnes of aluminium in their ball mills, connected to two 500 kW 6 kV motors. Tajikistan's extensive aluminium processing industry depends entirely on imported ore.

=== Uranium ===
Uranium and graphite were formerly exploited by the Soviets in the area northeast of Khudzhand. At its peak, it generated around 170 tonnes of waste rock annually. The Leninabad Mining and Chemical Combine was founded in 1945 in Sughd Province, and the city of Chkalovsk was established to support it. The facility was the centre of the uranium industry in the Tajik SSR until its closure in 1992, with IA Vostokredmet succeeding the plant. It's estimated that the plant holds approximately 55 tonnes of uranium reserves.

=== Other ===
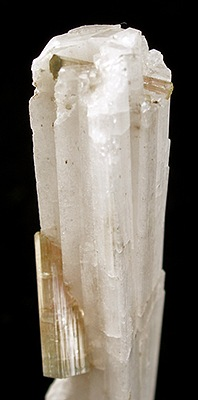
Hambergite (a type of borate) mined in the Pamir Mountains

Mercury was mined at the Dzhizhikrutskoye deposit, north of Dushanbe. Antimony was extracted at Isfara and Dzhizhikrutskoye (2,000 tonnes in 2000); and arsenic, cadmium, tungsten, and lead-zinc in the Yuzhno-Yangikanskiy deposit, north of the Zeravshan River. Copper-bismuth, antimony-mercury, and lead-silver ores are also extracted. Antimony deposits are stated to be the largest in the Commonwealth of Independent States (CIS) region. Silver deposits have been reported from the northeastern region of Bol'shoy Kanimansur region, which are also considered as one of the largest in the world, apart from being the largest in CIS region.

Rare metals reserves of gallium, germanium, indium, selenium, tellurium and thallium have been established; some amount of thallium was mined in the 1990s. Some of the rarer minerals are said to be located in the Zerafshan region. Northern Tajikistan has resources required for construction such as granite, limestone, marble and volcanic tuff. Coal extraction is also reported from Fan-Yagnon and Shurab areas.

Strontium deposits have been established in the southern region of Tajikistan in the Chilkultan and Davgir region and these deposits are in the process of commercial exploitation. Deposits of boron, sodium chloride, carbonates, fluorite, precious and semiprecious stones have also been reported. Among the Central Asian republics, Tajikistan ranks first in lead, zinc, and fluorspar resources.

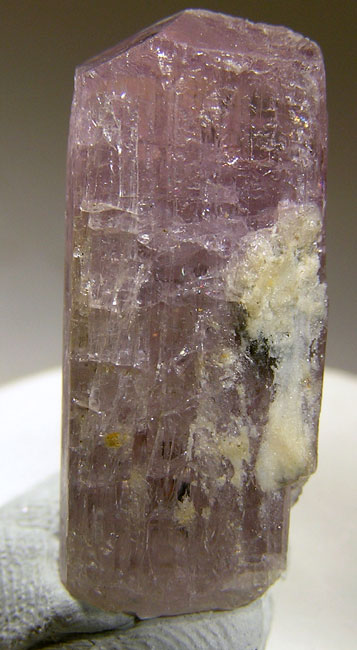
Scapolite

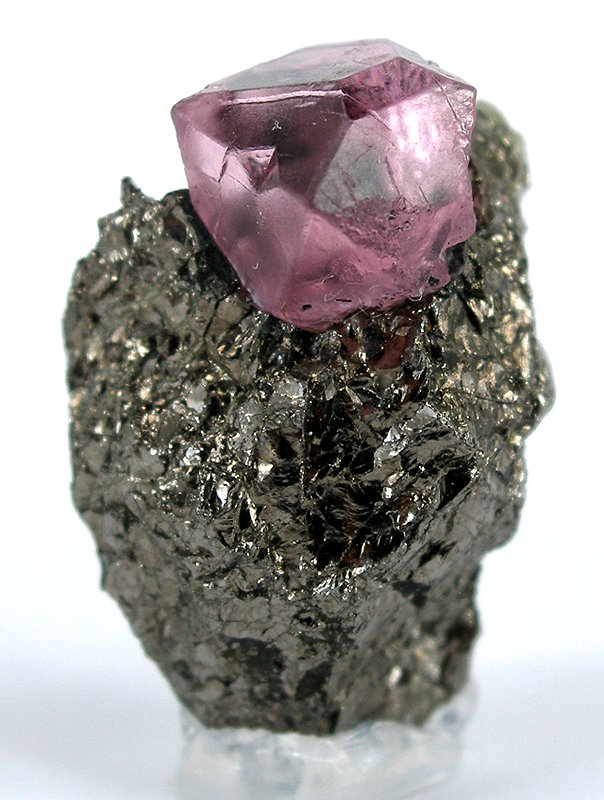
Spinel on pyrrhotite

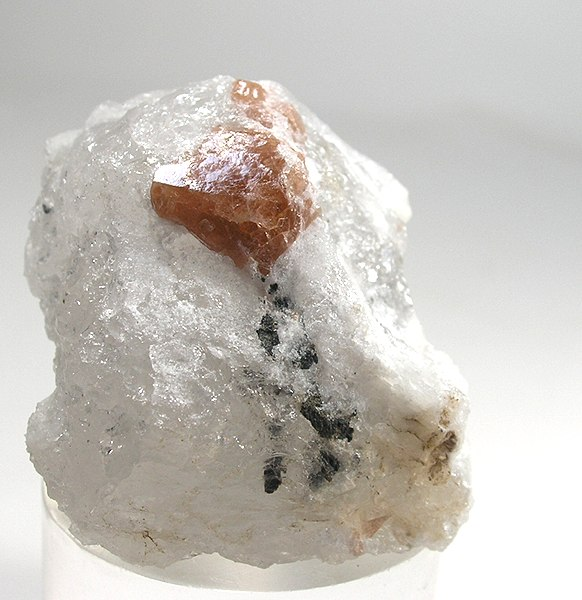
Stillwellite-(Ce)

== Fossil fuels ==
Natural gas is produced in the Gissar Valley and Vakhsh Valley, oil in both the north and south and brown coal is produced at Shurab in the Leninabad region. Coal exploitation in the country has been a major contributor to the national economy in recent years with output of hard coal increasing by 39% to 31,200 tonnes, and brown coal increasing by 70% to 15,200 tonnes. The bulk of foreign investment into Tajik mining activities derives from companies from Canada, United States, United Kingdom, Korea, Germany, Switzerland, Italy, Hungary and Russia, although compared to some of the other Asian countries, investment is extremely low due to the proximity of Tajikistan to Afghanistan and political barriers.

== Waste management ==
Heavy metals from mining can be harmful to the environment when left exposed, and failures to manage wastes may cause pollution. Wastes from the Anzob processing plant contain antimony, mercury, and sulfates. Wastes from the Adrasman plant contain cadmium, lead, and zinc. Wastes from the Leninabad rare metals plant contain cobalt, molybdenum, nickel, and tungsten. Wastes from the Takob smelter contain lead and zinc. Mining and heavy industry in the Ferghana Valley have contaminated the soil with toxic heavy metals.

== Gallery ==
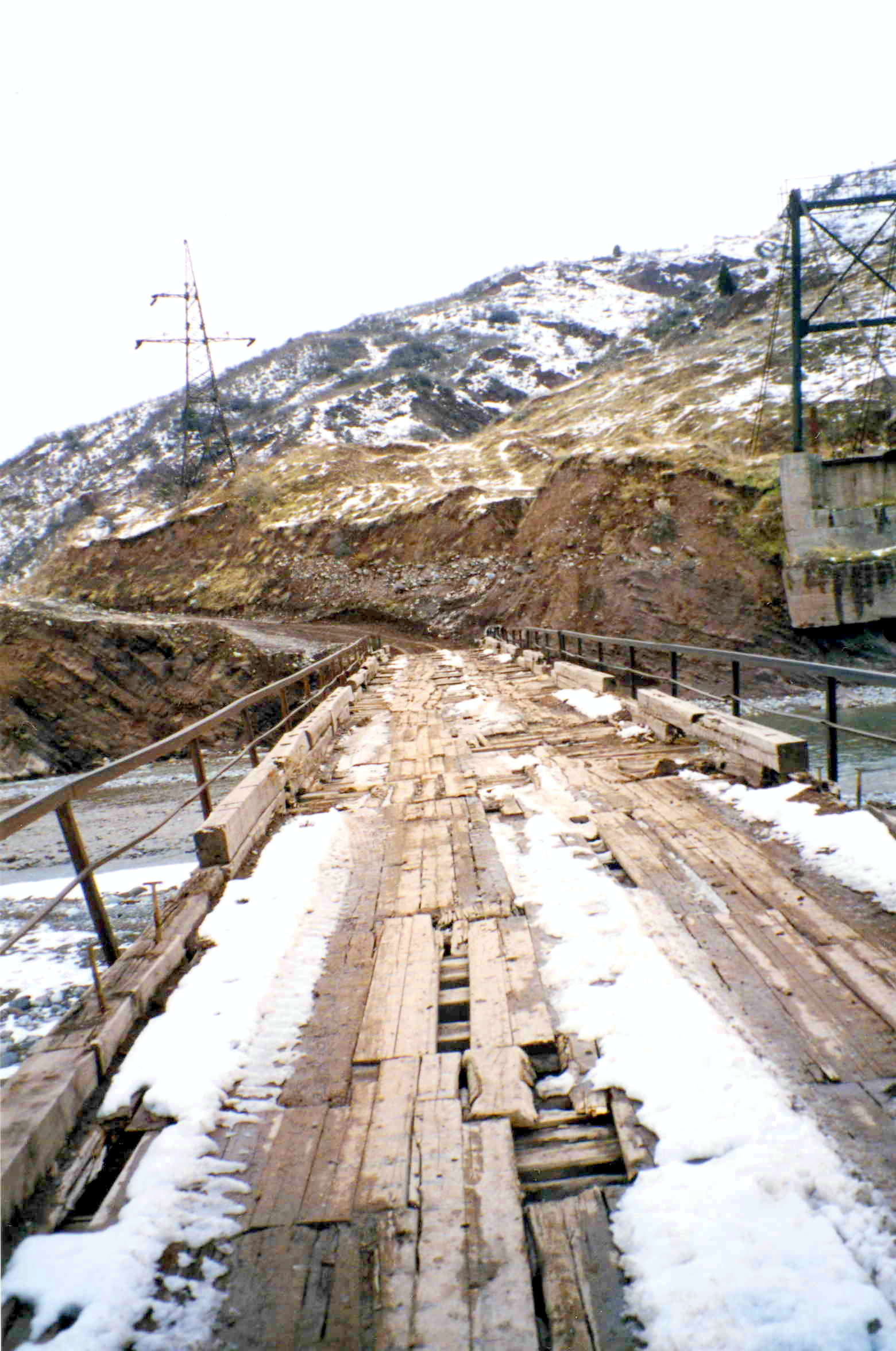
Bridge from Siafark to the mine.

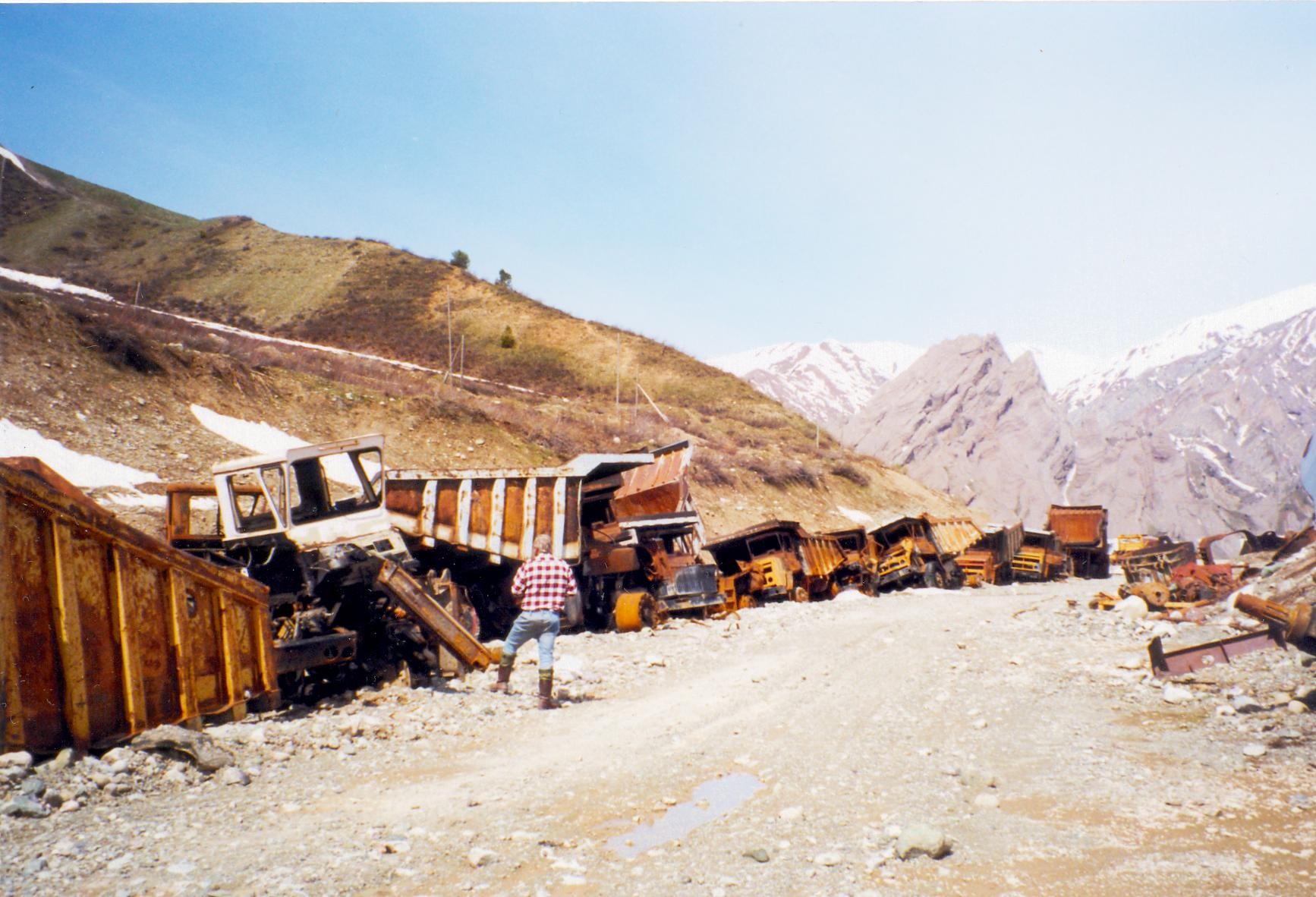
Destruction of machinery during Civil War in Tajikistan.

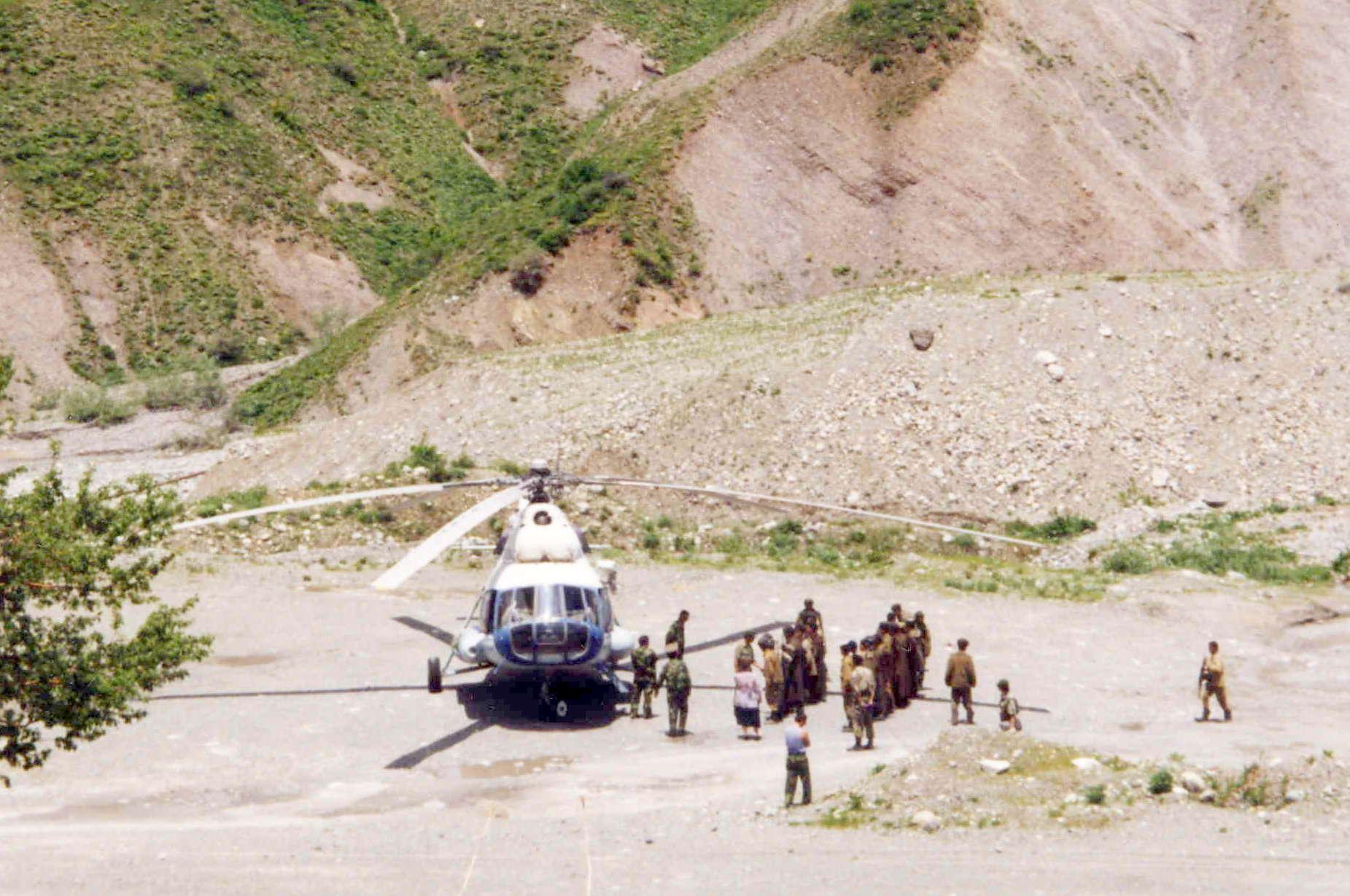
Tajik soldiers guarding the Darwaz mine.
