= Aktash =

Aktash, which means 'white rock' in many Turkic languages, may refer to:

- Aktash (river), a river in the Republic of Dagestan, Russia
- Ak-Tash (disambiguation), several villages in Kyrgyzstan
- Aktash, Russia, several rural localities in Russia
- Aktash Massif Important Bird Area, Tajikistan
- Aktashite, a mineral
- Oqtosh, a town in the Narpay District, Uzbekistan
- Oqtosh, Namangan Region, a town in the Toʻraqoʻrgʻon District, Uzbekistan

== See also ==
- Aktaş (disambiguation)
