= Aktaş =

Aktaş (literally "white stone") is a Turkish name that may refer to:

== Surname ==
- Ceyda Aktaş (born 1994), Turkish female volleyball player
- Emre Aktaş (born 1986), Turkish footballer
- Gülşen Aktaş (born 1957), Turkish schoolteacher and political scientist
- Kubilay Aktaş (born 1995), Turkish footballer
- Metin Aktaş (born 1977), Turkish footballer
- Serap Aktaş (born 1971), Turkish female long-distance runner
- Serenay Aktaş (born 1993), Turkish women's footballer, and television and film actress
- Süleyman Aktaş, Turkish serial killer
- Uğur Aktaş (karateka) (born 1995), Turkish karateka

== Places ==
- Lake Aktaş, on the Georgia–Turkey border
- Aktaş Dağı, a mountain on the Iran–Turkey border

=== Turkey ===
Alphabetical by province, then district

- Aktaş, Karaisalı, Adana Province
- Aktaş, Kahta, Adıyaman Province
- Aktaş, Amasya, Amasya Province
- Aktaş, Şereflikoçhisar, Ankara Province
- Aktaş, Sındırgı, Balıkesir Province
- Aktaş, Ulus, Bartın Province
- Aktaş, Gölpazarı, Bilecik Province
- Aktaş, Adaklı, Bingöl Province
- Aktaş, Gerede, Bolu Province
- Aktaş, Büyükorhan, Bursa Province
- Aktaş, Ilgaz, Çankırı Province
- Aktaş, Buldan, Denizli Province
- Aktaş, Çivril, Denizli Province
- Aktaş, Çüngüş, Diyarbakır Province
- Aktaş, Akçakoca, Düzce Province
- Aktaş, Kemah, Erzincan Province
- Aktaş, Tercan, Erzincan Province
- Aktaş, İspir, Erzurum Province
- Aktaş, Şenkaya, Erzurum Province
- Aktaş, Kumlu, Hatay Province
- Aktaş, Araç, Kastamonu Province
- Aktaş, Niğde, Niğde Province
- Aktaş, Pazar, Rize Province
- Aktaş, Siirt, Siirt Province
- Aktaş, Ovacık, Tunceli Province

== See also ==
- Aktash (disambiguation), an alternate spelling
