= Zarchasma =

- Location in Tajikistan
- Coordinates: 40°40′15″N 69°57′40″E
- Country: Tajikistan
- Region: Sughd Region
- City: Guliston
- Official languages: Russian (Interethnic); Tajik (State)

Zarchasma (Russian and Tajik: Зарчашма, formerly: Qaromazor) is a village in Sughd Region, northern Tajikistan. It is part of the jamoat Adrasmon in the city of Guliston.
