= Leninabad Mining and Chemical Combine =

Former uranium processing plant in the Soviet Union

The Leninabad Mining and Chemical Combine was a uranium processing plant in the Soviet Union. It was founded in 1945 in Leninabad, Tajikistan, as a hydro-metallurgical uranium enterprise to exploit uranium deposits across Central Asia. It was the first plant in the Soviet Union to produce yellowcake (a concentrated form of uranium).

The plant provided material for the Soviet Union's defense and power industries, and contributed to the production of its first nuclear bomb test. By 1953, it annually processed up to 1,000,000 tons of uranium ore. Operations stopped in 1992 when uranium mining ceased in Tajikistan. The plant left an environmental impact by dispersing radioactive waste into the surrounding areas, which has posed health hazards to nearby communities. Its successor, IA Vostokredmet, focuses on underground metal heap leaching.

== Establishment and operations ==
The origins of the plant trace back to 1925, when a uranium deposit was discovered in Taboshary, and then in 1943, an experimental radium production center was established near Leninabad. By resolution of the State Defense Committee, the plant was established on May 15, 1945. In 1946, Chkalovsk was built within 10 kilometers of the plant to support it. During the Soviet period, it was a strategically important location and classified as a closed city. The Leninabad Mining and Chemical Combine comprised seven mines and five processing plants for the extraction and enrichment of uranium ore, becoming the first Soviet plant to produce yellowcake.

The uranium ore was mined domestically from deposits such as Adrasmon and Taboshar in Tajikistan, as well as from neighboring regions including Kyzyl-Jhar, Mayluu-Suu, Shekaftar, Töömoyun in Kyrgyzstan, and the Fergana Valley. Most of the mining and transportation operations were performed manually, with ore transported by donkeys and camels along the trails of the Pamir Mountains. After processing, the enriched uranium was transported to a facility in the Ural region.

From 1945 to 1950, the plant also treated uranium concentrates imported from East Germany, Bulgaria, Poland, and Czechoslovakia, making it a hub for Soviet uranium enrichment. By 1947, it had processed 176,600 tons of uranium ore, and 66 tons of uranium, producing yellowcake for Soviet nuclear power and the production of the Soviet Union's first atomic bomb test. By 1953, its annual processing capacity had expanded to process 1,000,000 tons of uranium ore to produce over 400 tons of uranium.

Following the dissolution of the Soviet Union in 1991, and the cessation of uranium mining in Tajikistan in 1992, IA Vostokredmet succeeded the Leninabad Mining and Chemical Combine, and specializes in heap leaching of ferromolybdenum, gold, and silver.

== Environmental impact ==
Uranium waste was returned to the rural spaces, and the valuable material was transported to Kazakhstan and Russia. The plant's operations dispersed approximately 550 million tons of radioactive waste across nearby settlements, and polluted at least 180 hectares of land. Among the most notable tailing sites is the Digmai dump, located a few kilometers from Khujand, in the plains, posing an environmental threat. Unaware of uranium dangers, Chkalovsk residents housed livestock on waste sites and learned the risks when sheep drinking pond water collapsed and died.
