= Demirler =

Demirler can refer to:

- Demirler, Büyükorhan
- Demirler, Gerede
