= Choruqdayrron =

Choruqdayrron Russian: Чорух-Дайрон Tajik: Чоруқдайррон
- Location in Tajikistan
- Coordinates: 40°23′49″N 69°40′7″E
- Country: Tajikistan
- Region: Sughd Region
- City: Guliston

Population (2020)
  - Total: 3,700

Choruqdayrron (Russian: Чорух-Дайрон, Tajik: Чоруқдайррон, romanized: Chorukh-Dayron) is a town in northern Tajikistan. It is located in Sughd Region. It is part of the city of Guliston.
