= Sirdaryo, Tajikistan =

Sirdaryo Russian: Сырдарьинский Tajik: Сирдарё
- Location in Tajikistan
- Coordinates: 40°15′09″N 69°43′49″E
- Country: Tajikistan
- Region: Sughd Region
- City: Guliston

Population (2020)
  - Total: 2,800
- Official languages: Russian (Interethnic); Tajik (State)

Sirdaryo (Tajik: Сирдарё, Russian: Сырдарьинский Syrdaryinsky) is a town in Sughd Region, northern Tajikistan. It is part of the city of Guliston.
