= Armutçuk =

Armutçuk can refer to the following places in Turkey:

- Armutçuk, Gölpazarı, a village in Bilecik Province
- Armutçuk, Büyükorhan, a village in Bursa Province
- Armutcuk, Yenice, a village in Çanakkale Province
- the former name of Kandilli, a town in Zonguldak Province
