= Balaban, Büyükorhan =

Village in Turkey

Balaban
- Neighbourhood
- Location in Turkey Balaban (Marmara)
- Coordinates: 39.7658°N 28.9340°E
- Country: Turkey
- Province: Bursa
- District: Büyükorhan
- Population (2022): 214
- Time zone: UTC+3 (TRT)

Balaban is a neighbourhood in the municipality and district of Büyükorhan, Bursa Province in Turkey. Its population is 214 (2022).
