= Büyükorhan =

- District and municipality
- Map showing Büyükorhan District in Bursa Province

- Location in Turkey Büyükorhan (Marmara)
- Coordinates: 39°45′N 28°55′E
- Country: Turkey
- Province: Bursa

Government
  - Mayor: Kamil Turhan (AKP)
- Area: 505 km^{2} (195 sq mi)
- Population (2022): 8,940
  - Density: 17.7/km^{2} (45.9/sq mi)
- Time zone: UTC+3 (TRT)
- Area code: 0224
- Website: www.buyukorhan.bel.tr

Büyükorhan is a municipality and district of Bursa Province, Turkey. Its area is 505 km^{2}, and its population is 8,940 (2022).

== Composition ==
There are 39 neighbourhoods in Büyükorhan District:

- Akçasaz
- Aktaş
- Armutçuk
- Bademlik
- Balaban
- Bayındır
- Burunca
- Çakıryenice
- Çeribaşı
- Danaçalı
- Danacılar
- Demirler
- Derecik
- Düğüncüler
- Durhasan
- Elekçalı
- Ericek
- Gedikler
- Geynik
- Hacıahmetler
- Hacılar
- Hemşeriler
- Karaağız
- Karaçukur
- Karalar
- Kayapa
- Kınık
- Kuşlar
- Mazlumlar
- Örencik
- Osmanlar
- Özlüce
- Perçin
- Pınarköy
- Pirebeyler
- Sarnıçköy
- Tekerler
- Yenice
- Zaferiye
