= Kuşlar, Büyükorhan =

Village in Turkey

Kuşlar
- Neighbourhood
- Country: Turkey
- Province: Bursa
- District: Büyükorhan
- Population (2022): 134
- Time zone: UTC+3 (TRT)

Kuşlar is a neighbourhood in the municipality and district of Büyükorhan, Bursa Province in Turkey. Its population is 134 (2022).
