= Elekçalı, Büyükorhan =

Village in Turkey

Elekçalı
- Neighbourhood
- Location in Turkey Elekçalı (Marmara)
- Coordinates: 39°45′15″N 28°45′04″E
- Country: Turkey
- Province: Bursa
- District: Büyükorhan
- Population (2022): 42
- Time zone: UTC+3 (TRT)

Elekçalı is a neighbourhood in the municipality and district of Büyükorhan, Bursa Province in Turkey. Its population is 42 (2022).
