= Burunca, Büyükorhan =

Village in Turkey

Burunca
- Neighbourhood
- Location in Turkey Burunca (Marmara)
- Coordinates: 39.7958°N 28.7270°E
- Country: Turkey
- Province: Bursa
- District: Büyükorhan
- Population (2022): 111
- Time zone: UTC+3 (TRT)

Burunca is a neighbourhood in the municipality and district of Büyükorhan, Bursa Province in Turkey. Its population is 111 (2022).
