= Akçasaz, Büyükorhan =

Village in Turkey

Akçasaz
- Neighbourhood
- Location in Turkey Akçasaz (Marmara)
- Coordinates: 39°39′37″N 28°55′01″E
- Country: Turkey
- Province: Bursa
- District: Büyükorhan
- Population (2022): 146
- Time zone: UTC+3 (TRT)

Akçasaz is a neighbourhood in the municipality and district of Büyükorhan, Bursa Province in Turkey. Its population is 146 (2022).
