= Kayapa, Büyükorhan =

Village in Turkey

Kayapa
- Neighbourhood
- Country: Turkey
- Province: Bursa
- District: Büyükorhan
- Population (2022): 145
- Time zone: UTC+3 (TRT)

Kayapa is a neighbourhood in the municipality and district of Büyükorhan, Bursa Province in Turkey. Its population is 145 (2022).
