= Bayındır, Büyükorhan =

Village in Turkey

Bayındır
- Neighbourhood
- Location in Turkey Bayındır (Marmara)
- Coordinates: 39.7218°N 28.7762°E
- Country: Turkey
- Province: Bursa
- District: Büyükorhan
- Population (2022): 92
- Time zone: UTC+3 (TRT)

Bayındır is a neighbourhood in the municipality and district of Büyükorhan, Bursa Province in Turkey. Its population is 92 (2022).
