= Özlüce, Büyükorhan =

Village in Turkey

Coordinates: 39.8138°N 28.9299°E

Özlüce
- Neighbourhood
- Location in Turkey Özlüce (Marmara)
- Coordinates
- Country: Turkey
- Province: Bursa
- District: Büyükorhan
- Population (2022): 76
- Time zone: UTC+3 (TRT)

Özlüce is a neighborhood in the municipality and district of Büyükorhan, Bursa Province in Turkey. Its population is 76 (2022).
