= Geynik, Büyükorhan =

Village in Turkey

Geynik
- Neighbourhood
- Location in Turkey Geynik (Marmara)
- Coordinates: 39°42′20″N 28°48′08″E
- Country: Turkey
- Province: Bursa
- District: Büyükorhan
- Population (2022): 144
- Time zone: UTC+3 (TRT)

Geynik is a neighbourhood in the municipality and district of Büyükorhan, Bursa Province, in Turkey. Its population is 144 (2022).
