= Pirebeyler, Büyükorhan =

Village in Turkey

Pirebeyler
- Neighbourhood
- Location in Turkey Pirebeyler (Marmara)
- Coordinates: 39°39′N 28°49′E
- Country: Turkey
- Province: Bursa
- District: Büyükorhan
- Population (2022): 83
- Time zone: UTC+3 (TRT)

Pirebeyler (also: Piribeyler) is a neighbourhood in the municipality and district of Büyükorhan, Bursa Province in Turkey. Its population is 83 (2022).

The village is over 400 years old. In the beginning of the 17th Century the village had Christian inhabitants. In the child levy of the winter between 1603-1604, teenagers were levied into the Devshirme system.
