= Adrasmon =

Adrasmon Russian: Адрасман Tajik: Адрасмон
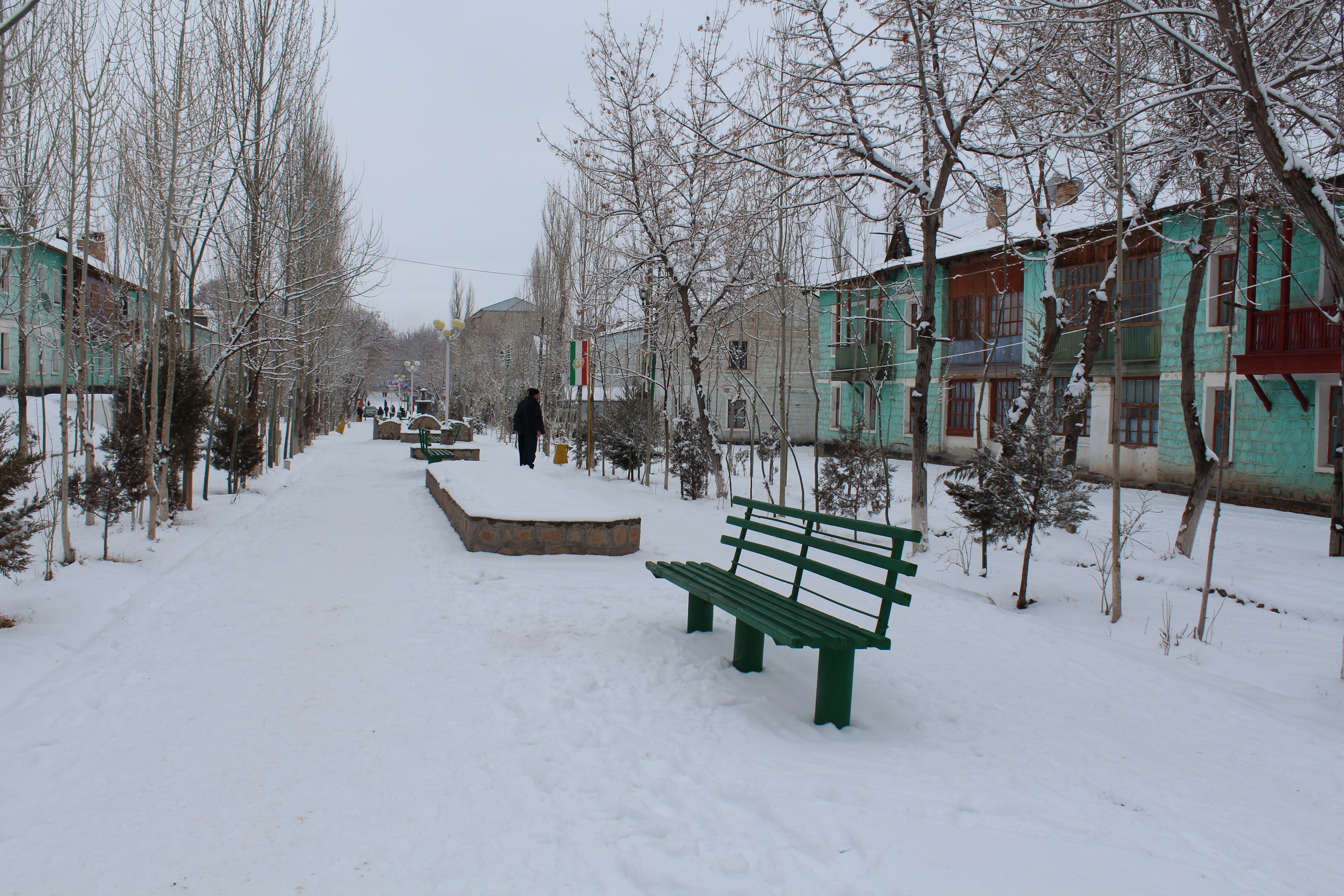

- Location in Tajikistan
- Coordinates: 40°38′55″N 69°59′8″E
- Country: Tajikistan
- Region: Sughd Region
- City: Guliston

Population (2020)
  - Total: 15,800

Adrasmon is a town and jamoat in northern Tajikistan. It is part of the city of Guliston, and lies in the extreme northeast of Sughd Region, about 60 km northeast of Guliston. The jamoat consists of the town of Adrasmon and three villages: Guldara, Gulshan and Zarchasma.
