= Mogoltau Massif Important Bird Area =

Tract of land in Sughd Province, Tajikistan

Coordinates: 40°52′38″N 70°24′16″E

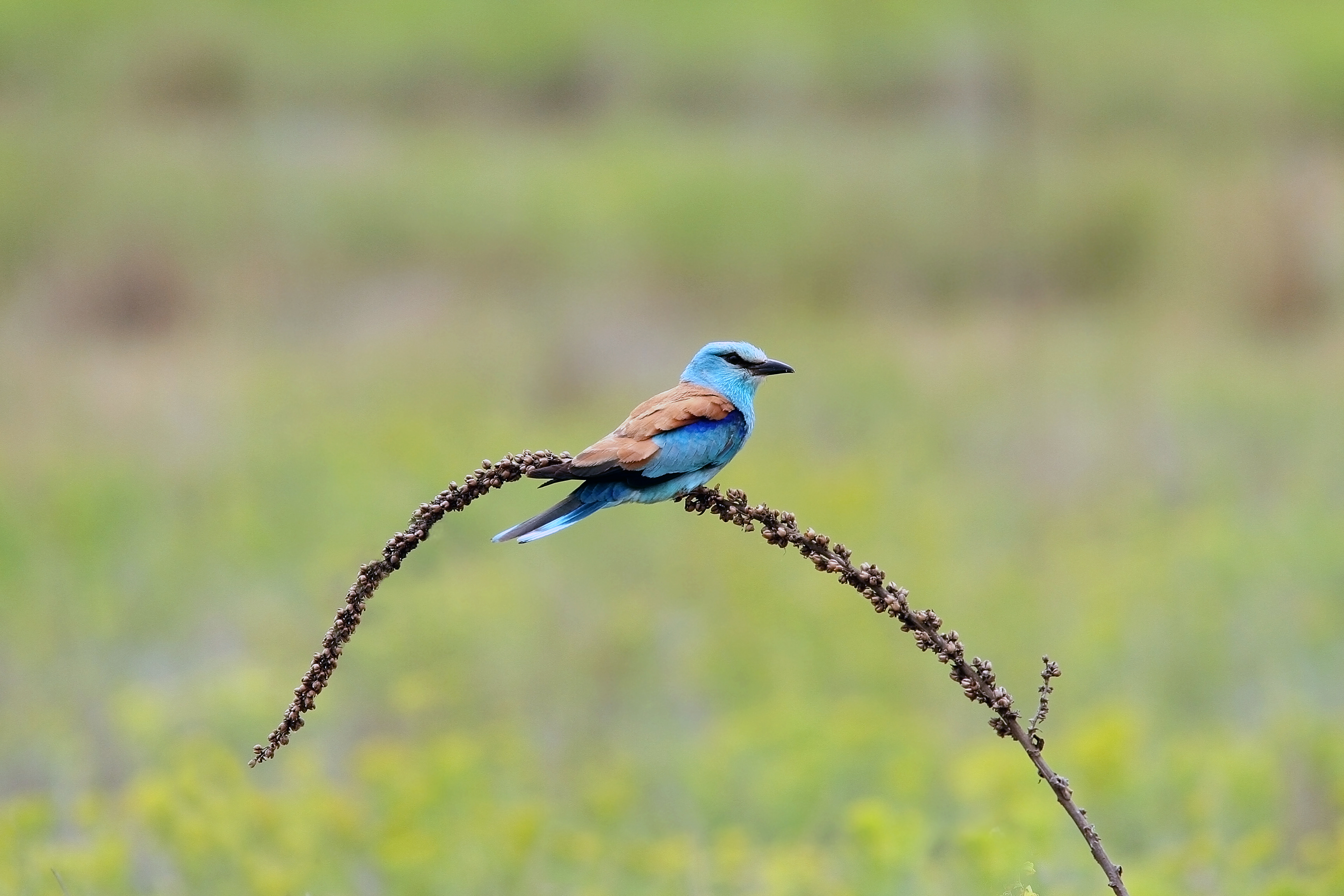
European rollers breed in the IBA.

The Mogoltau Massif Important Bird Area is a 268 km^{2} tract of land in north-eastern Sughd Province in northwestern Tajikistan. It has been identified by BirdLife International as an Important Bird Area (IBA).

== Description ==
The Mogoltau Massif is an isolated massif some 40 km long and 15–25 km wide, with an area of 350 km^{2}, reaching an altitude of about 1600 m above sea level. The central high point is Muzbek peak with a height of 1624 m. The massif comprises a broad plateau of rubble, boulders, pebbles, gravel and loess-like loam. It is incised by mainly dry riverbeds formed by ephemeral streams which flow during the spring rains. The area contains several small settlements and is surrounded, by cultivated land. As an ecological island it has a distinct avifauna which is different from the nearby Turkestan and Kuraminskiy Ranges.

== Birds ==
The site was classified as an IBA because it supports significant numbers of the populations of various bird species, either as residents, or as breeding or passage migrants. These include saker falcons, cinereous vultures, European rollers, Upcher's warblers, plain leaf-warblers, white-throated robins, Finsch's wheatears, variable wheatears, chestnut-breasted buntings and grey-necked buntings.
