= Yenice, Büyükorhan =

Village in Turkey

Yenice
- Neighbourhood
- Location in Turkey Yenice (Marmara)
- Coordinates: 39.7608°N 28.9072°E
- Country: Turkey
- Province: Bursa
- District: Büyükorhan
- Population (2022): 607
- Time zone: UTC+3 (TRT)

Yenice is a neighbourhood in the municipality and district of Büyükorhan, Bursa Province in Turkey. Its population is 607 (2022).
