= Buston, Sughd =

Buston Бӯстон
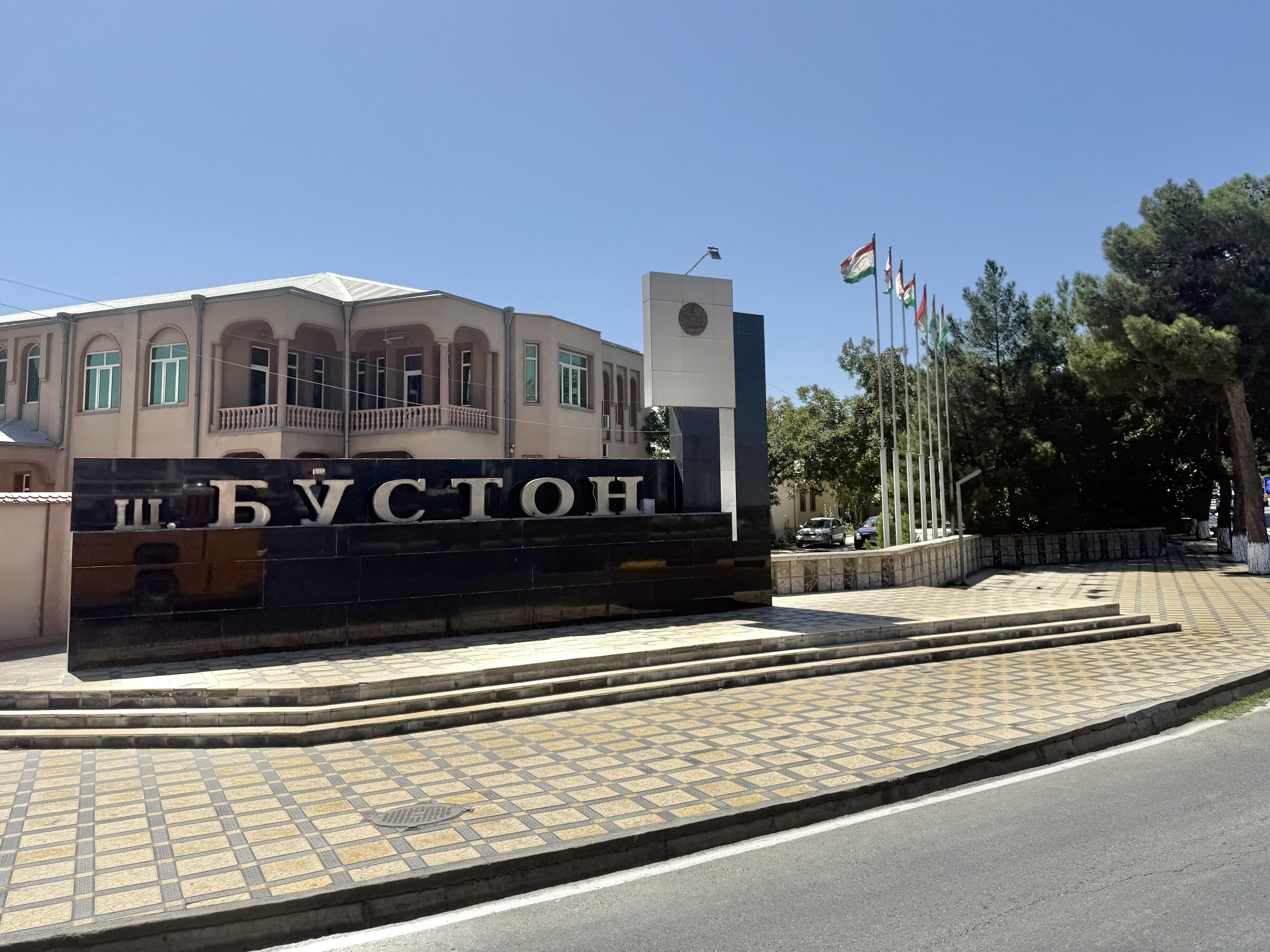

- Location in Tajikistan
- Coordinates: 40°14′19″N 69°41′48″E
- Country: Tajikistan
- Region: Sughd Region

Population (2020)
  - City: 36,900
  - Urban: 34,000
- Official languages: Russian (Interethnic); Tajik (State)

Buston (Tajik: Бӯстон; Persian: بوستان; Russian: Бустон, formerly Chkalovsk or Chkalov) is a town in northern Tajikistan. It is located in Sughd Region, between the cities of Khujand and Ghafurov. Buston is a city of regional subordination, and is not part of a district.

The population of Buston in 2020 is estimated at 34,000 for the city proper and 36,900 for the city with the outlying communities. The city of Guliston also covers the town Palos.

As a result of its involvement in the processing of uranium ore mined nearby, Chkalovsk was a closed city until the collapse of the USSR. The first Soviet uranium processing plant, Leninabad Mining and Chemical Combine was founded in Chkalovsk during the 1940s.

The Presidential National Guard of Tajikistan formed one of its new units here.

On February 1, 2016, the Government of Tajikistan decided to rename Chkalovsk as Buston (Бӯстон). According to TASS news agency, it was the last town in Tajikistan with a Russian name.

== Notable people ==
- Ruslan Ablayev (born 1972), Russian professional football coach and former player
- Lex Fridman, host of the Lex Fridman podcast and YouTube series, researcher at MIT

== See also ==
- List of cities in Tajikistan
