= Aktaş, Büyükorhan =

Village in Turkey

Aktaş
- Neighbourhood
- Location in Turkey Aktaş (Marmara)
- Coordinates: 39.8041°N 28.8140°E
- Country: Turkey
- Province: Bursa
- District: Büyükorhan
- Population (2022): 380
- Time zone: UTC+3 (TRT)

Aktaş is a neighbourhood in the municipality and district of Büyükorhan, Bursa Province in Turkey. Its population is 380 (2022).
