= Armutçuk, Büyükorhan =

Village in Turkey

Armutçuk
- Neighbourhood
- Location in Turkey Armutçuk (Marmara)
- Coordinates: 39.7949°N 28.8875°E
- Country: Turkey
- Province: Bursa
- District: Büyükorhan
- Population (2022): 233
- Time zone: UTC+3 (TRT)

Armutçuk is a neighbourhood in the municipality and district of Büyükorhan, Bursa Province in Turkey. Its population is 233 (2022).
