= IA Vostokredmet =

The Industrial Association Eastern Combine for Rare Metals (IA Vostokredmet) is an industrial complex in the western part of the Fergana Valley, Tajikistan. It is the country's first raw materials base, incorporating seven mines and five plants.

Established as a large-scale uranium mining enterprise, its basis was the uranium deposits of Tajikistan, Kyrgyzstan and Uzbekistan. Its predecessor prior to 1992 was the Leninabad Mining and Chemical Combine, which is located in Khodjent, Tajikistan. It includes processing plants and laboratories. It is notable in the field of underground and heap leaching of metals.
