= Aktaş Dağı =

Mountain in Turkey and Iran

Aktas Dağı
- Location within Turkey

Highest point
- Elevation: 2,715 m (8,907 ft)
- Coordinates: 39°6′N 44°12′E

Geography
- Location: Iran – Turkey border

Aktas Dağı is a mountain in western Asia, on the international border between Iran and Turkey. It is 2,715 metres (8,907 ft) tall.
