= Ak-Tash =

Ak-Tash may refer to the following places in Kyrgyzstan:

- Ak-Tash, Jalal-Abad, a village in Chatkal District, Jalal-Abad Region
- Ak-Tash, Osh, a village in Kara-Suu District, Osh Region
- Ak-Tash, Talas, a village in Manas District, Talas Region
