= Guliston, Sughd =

Guliston Гулистон
- Location in Tajikistan
- Coordinates: 40°15′53″N 69°47′22″E
- Country: Tajikistan
- Region: Sughd Region

Population (2020)
  - City: 49,200
  - Urban: 18,000
- Website: www.guliston.tj

Guliston (Russian: Гулистон; Tajik: Гулистон, before 2016: Qayroqqum or Kayrakkum) is a city in north-western Tajikistan. It is located in Sughd Region, at the western tip of the Kayrakkum Reservoir. Guliston is a city of regional subordination, and is not part of a district.

The population of Guliston in 2020 is estimated at 18,000 for the city proper and 49,200 including the outlying communities. The city of Guliston also covers the towns Adrasmon, Zarnisor, Konsoy, Navgarzan, Sirdaryo and Choruqdayrron.

== Etymology ==
The name Guliston and variations is a very common name in the Persians speaking world and means "Rose Garden ".

== See also ==
- List of cities in Tajikistan
- Guliston, Rudaki District
- Gulistan, Zafarabod District
- Gulistan, Hamadoni District a village outside of Moskovskiy, Tajikistan.
- Guliston Temurmalik District. A town on the Kulob railway line.
- Gulaston, Kulob, a suburb of Kulob.
- Gulastan, Uzbekistan.
- Guliston, Uzbekistan.
