= Aktash, Russia =

Aktash (Russian: Акташ), from Turkic "Aktaş" (lit. whitestone), is the name of several rural localities in Russia.

Modern localities

- Aktash, Altai Republic, a selo in Aktashskoye Rural Settlement of Ulagansky District of the Altai Republic
- Aktash, Republic of Tatarstan, a station in Almetyevsky District of the Republic of Tatarstan

Alternative names

- Aktash, alternative name of Russky Aktash, a selo in Almetyevsky District of the Republic of Tatarstan
- Aktash, alternative name of Verkhny Aktash, a selo in Almetyevsky District of the Republic of Tatarstan

See also

- Maly Aktash, a settlement in Aksubayevsky District of the Republic of Tatarstan
