= Demirler, Büyükorhan =

Village in Turkey

Demirler
- Neighbourhood
- Country: Turkey
- Province: Bursa
- District: Büyükorhan
- Population (2022): 90
- Time zone: UTC+3 (TRT)

Demirler is a neighbourhood in the municipality and district of Büyükorhan, Bursa Province in Turkey. Its population is 90 (2022).
