= Aktash Massif Important Bird Area =

Protected area in Sughd Province, Tajikistan

Coordinates: 40°52′38″N 70°24′16″E

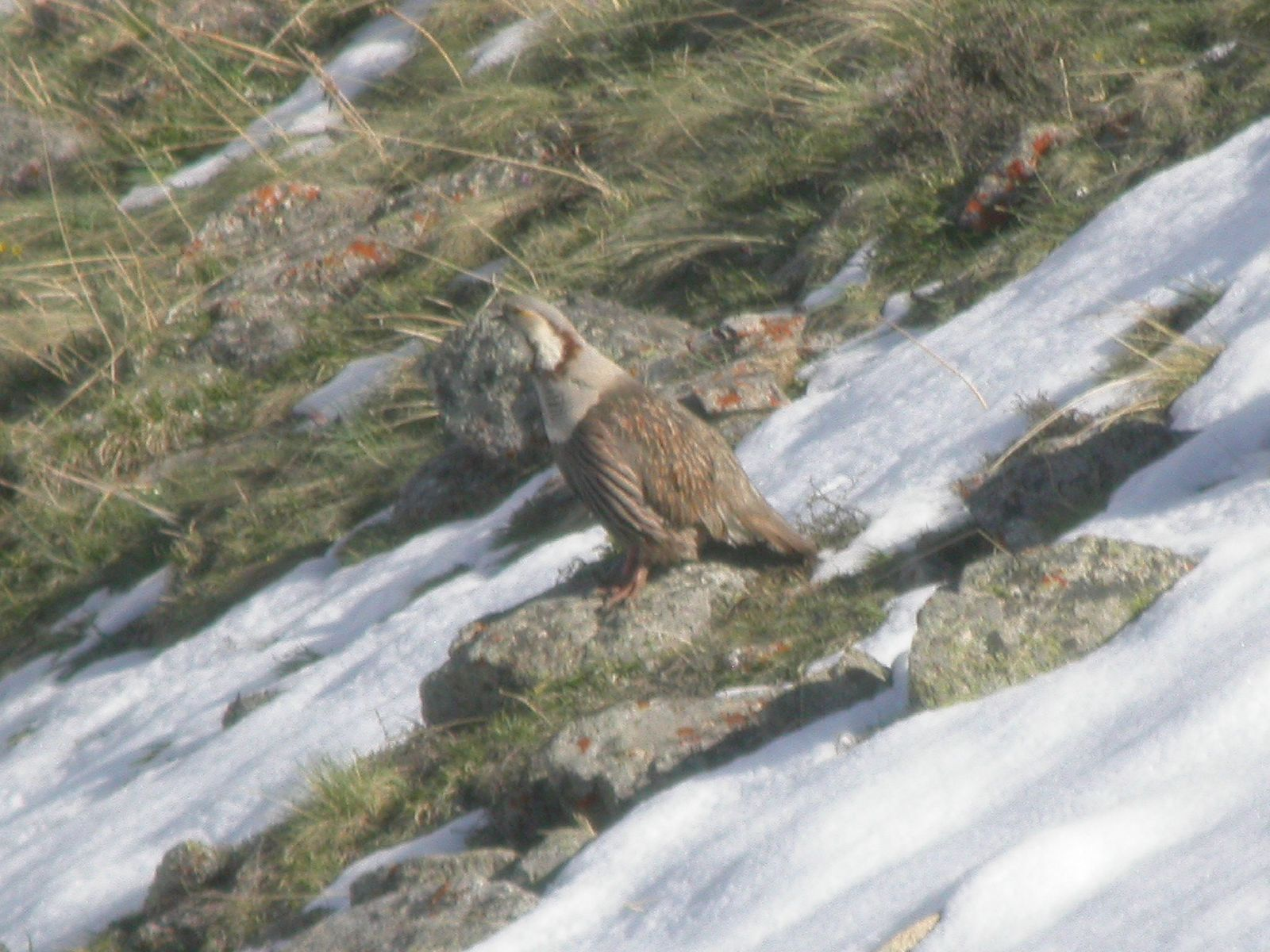
The IBA supports 7-8 breeding pairs of Himalayan snowcocks.

The Aktash Massif Important Bird Area lies in Sughd Province, the northernmost part of Tajikistan.

== Description ==
The Important Bird Area (IBA) is a mountainous 47,421 ha site covering the southern slope of the Kuraminskiy ridge on the border with Uzbekistan, which forms the eastern, northern and western limits of the IBA. Its altitude ranges from 1700 to 3000 m above sea level. It contains many snowfield- and spring-fed streams which flow into the Aktash and Ashtsay rivers – tributaries of the Syr Darya. Its juniper forests consist largely of old trees with a relatively open canopy, with regeneration restricted by overgrazing. The site includes the Aktashsky Zakaznik (nature reserve) which was established for the conservation of Menzbier's marmot, at the time the only place in Tajikistan where the species occurred, though it has since become extinct there.

== Birds ==
The site was identified as an IBA by BirdLife International because it supports populations of 162 species of birds, including Himalayan snowcocks, saker falcons, cinereous vultures, solitary snipes, European rollers, Alpine choughs, Hume's short-toed larks, sulphur-bellied warblers, wallcreepers, white-winged snowfinches, brown accentors, water pipits, red-fronted serins, crimson-winged finches, red-mantled rosefinches and white-winged grosbeaks.
