= Ruslan Ablayev =

Russian footballer and coach

Personal information
- Full name: Ruslan Zudiyevich Ablayev
- Date of birth: 29 June 1972 (age 54)
- Place of birth: Chkalovsk, Tajik SSR
- Height: 1.86 m (6 ft 1 in)
- Position: Goalkeeper

Team information
- Current team: FC Fakel-M Voronezh (GK coach)

Senior career*
Years	Team	Apps	(Gls)
1988–1991	FK Yangier	85	(0)
1992–1995	FC Fakel Voronezh	40	(0)
1996–2002	FC Lokomotiv Liski	247	(0)
2003	FC Severstal Cherepovets	7	(0)
2005–2008	FC Lokomotiv Liski	73	(0)

Managerial career
- 2010–2013: FC Lokomotiv Liski (assistant)
- 2013: FC Fakel Voronezh (GK coach)
- 2018–2021: FC Fakel Voronezh (GK coach)
- 2021–: FC Fakel-M Voronezh (GK coach)
- 2021: FC Fakel-M Voronezh (caretaker)
- * Club domestic league appearances and goals

Ruslan Zudiyevich Ablayev (Russian: Руслан Зудиевич Аблаев; born 29 June 1972) is a Russian professional football coach and a former player. He works as a goalkeeping coach with FC Fakel Voronezh.

== Club career ==
He played one season in the Russian Premier League in 1992 for FC Fakel Voronezh.
