= Sughd Region =

Region of Tajikistan

Sughd Province Вилояти Суғд (Tajik) Согдийская область (Russian)
- Province
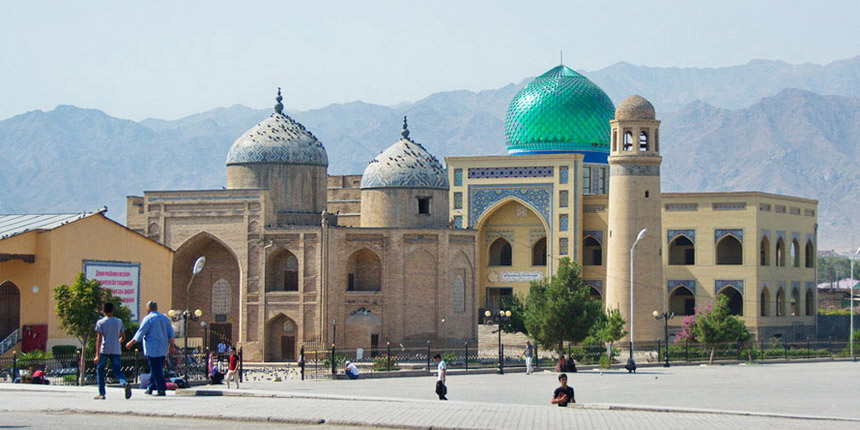
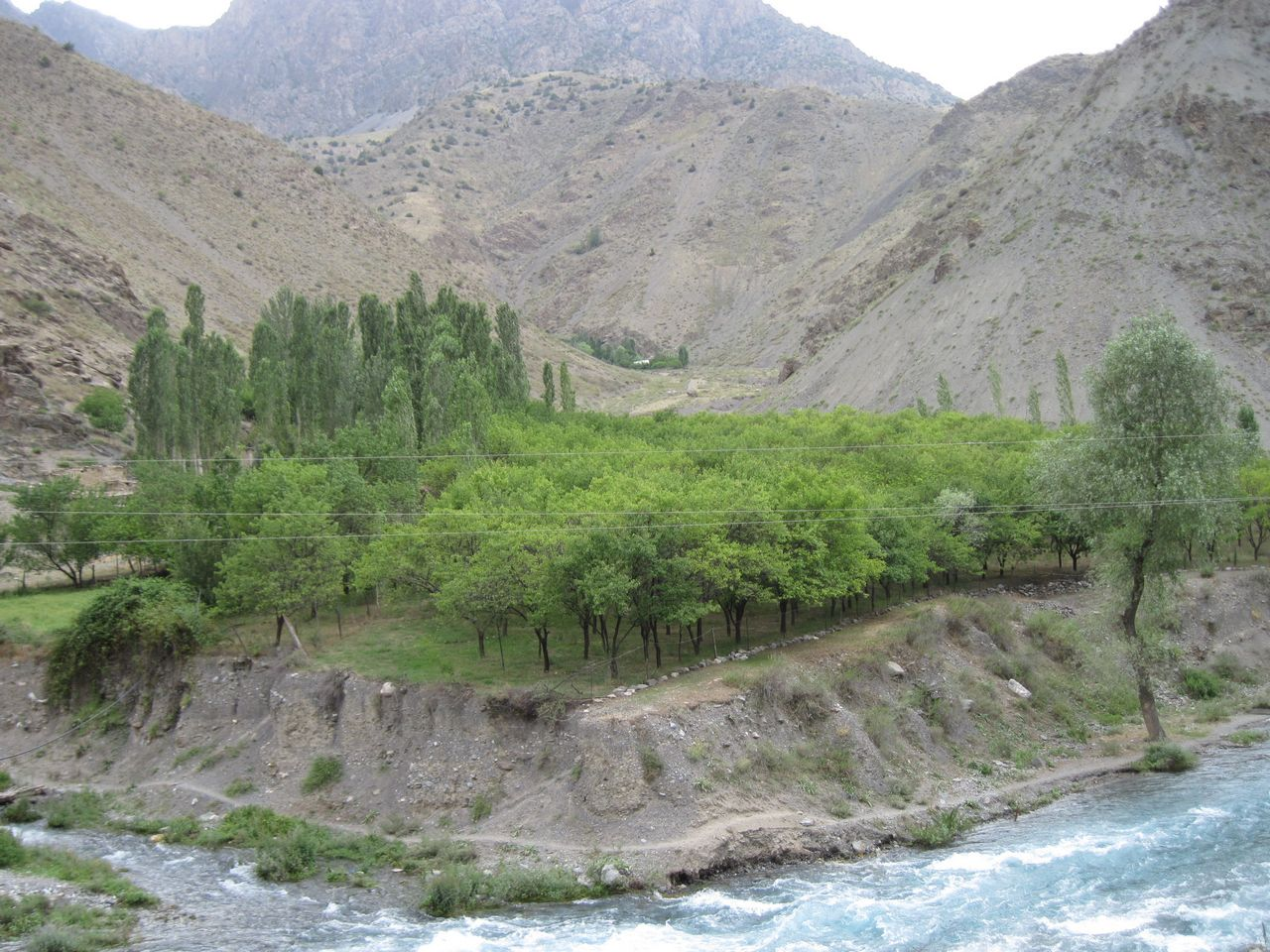
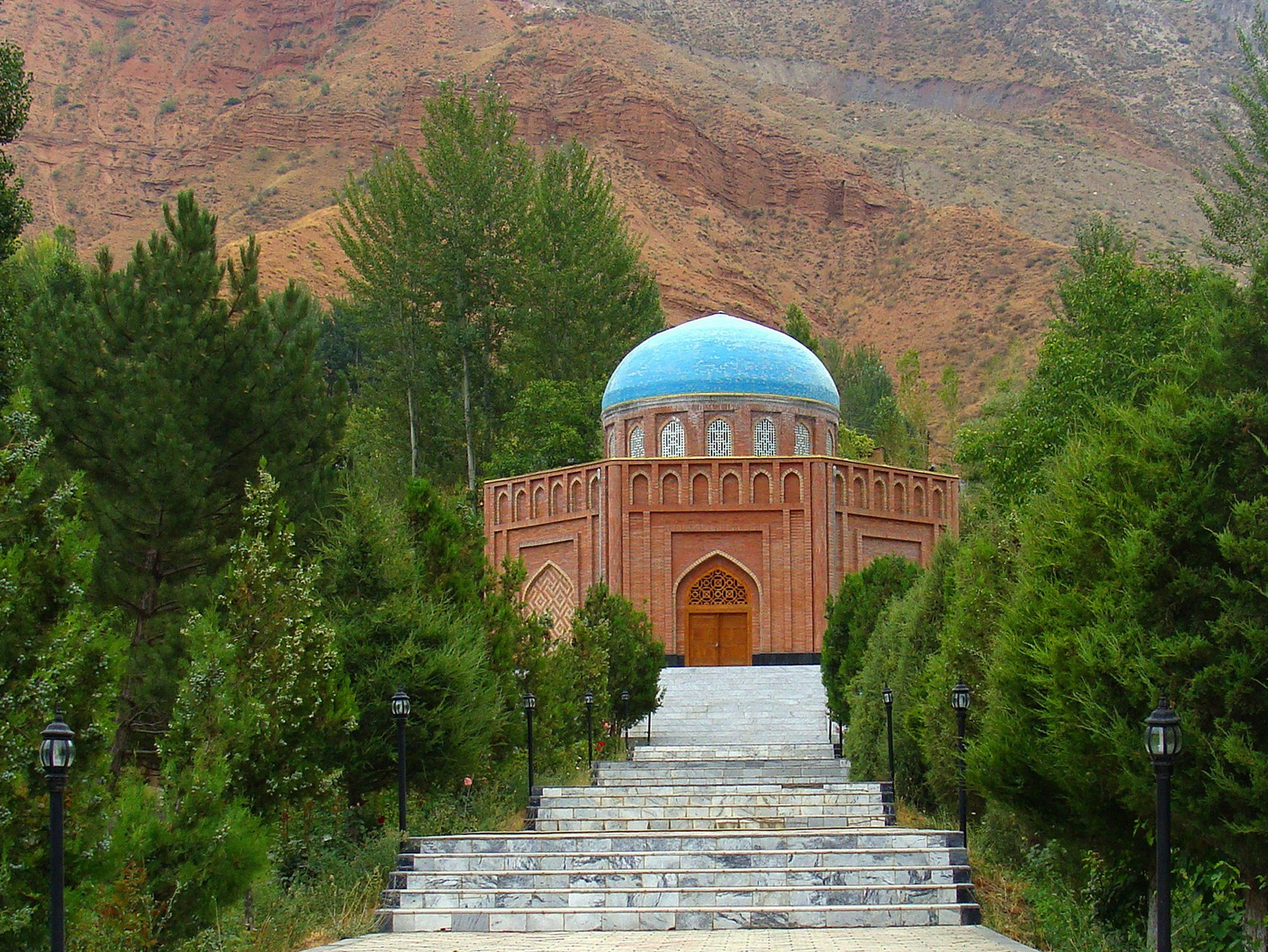
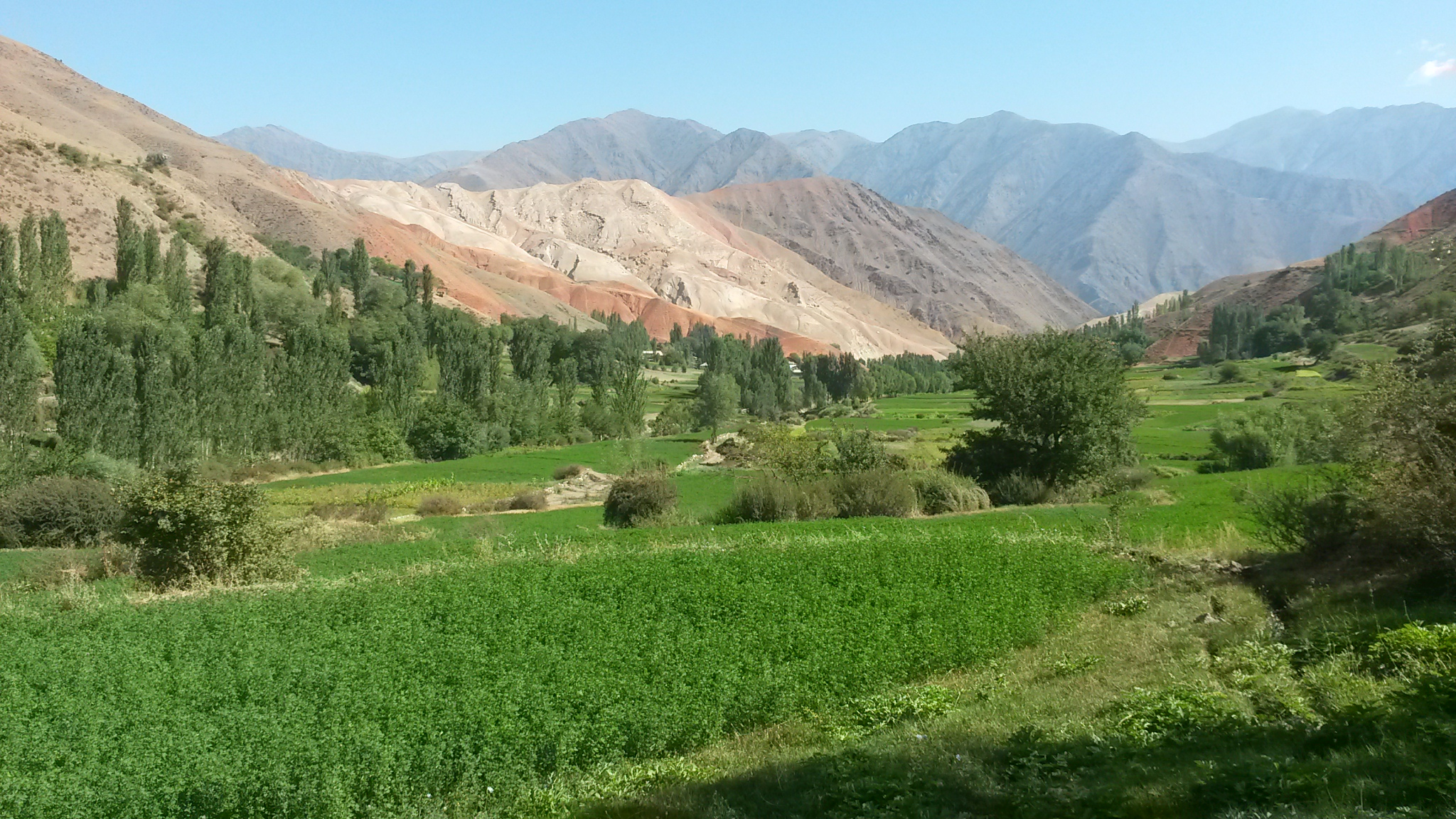
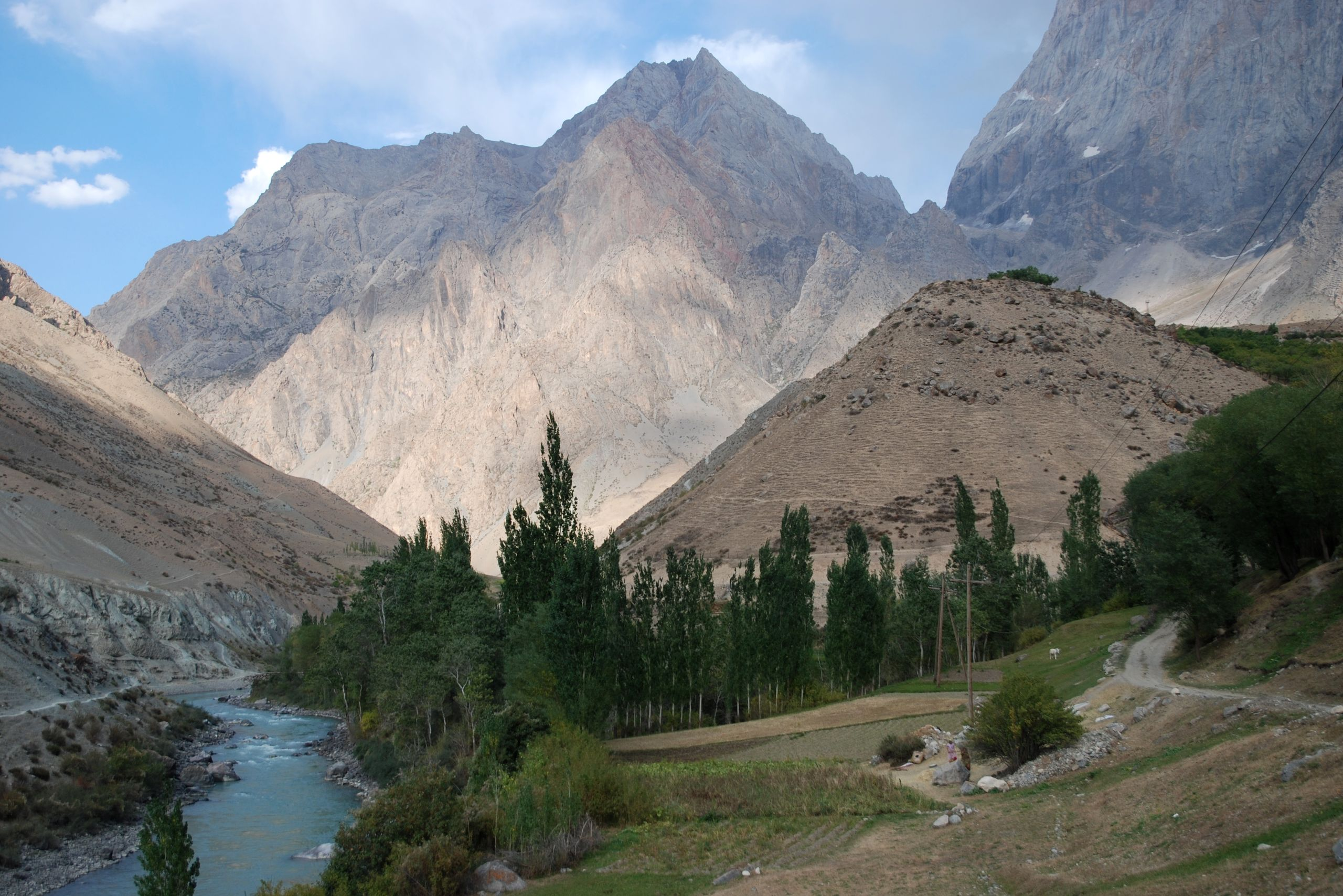
- From the top to bottom-right, Khujand, Panjakent District, Rudaki's Tomb, Ayni District, Yaghnob River

- Sughd in Tajikistan
- Coordinates: 39°30′N 69°0′E
- Country: Tajikistan
- Capital: Khujand

Area
  - Total: 25,200 km^{2} (9,700 sq mi)

Population (2020)
  - Total: 2,707,300
  - Density: 107/km^{2} (278/sq mi)
- ISO 3166 code: TJ-SU
- HDI (2023): 0.695 medium
- Official languages: Russian (Interethnic); Tajik (State)

Sughd Province, (Note: Tajik: Вилояти Суғд, romanized: Viloyati Sug‘d, Persian alphabet: ولایت سغد, IPA: [ʋɪlɔˈjatʰɪ ˈsʊʁd]; Uzbek: Суғд вилояти, romanized: Sugʻd viloyati; Russian: Согдийская область) also referred to as the Sogdia Region, and Leninabad before 2001, is one of the four administrative divisions and one of the three provinces that make up Tajikistan. Centered in historical Sogdiana, it is located in the northwest of the country, with an area of some 25,400 square kilometers and a population of 2,707,300 (2020 estimate), up from 2,233,550 according to the 2010 census and 1,871,979 in 2000. The capital is Khujand. The Province's ethnic composition in 2010 was 84% Tajik, 14.8% Uzbek, 0.6% Kyrgyz, 0.4% Russian and 0.1% Tatar.

The province shares a border with Uzbekistan (Surxondaryo, Qashqadaryo, Jizzakh, Sirdaryo, Namangan, Samarkand, Tashkent and Fergana regions), Kyrgyzstan (Osh and Batken regions) and Districts of Republican Subordination. The Syr Darya river flows through it. It contains the Akash Massif and Mogoltau Massif Important Bird Areas. Sughd is separated from the rest of Tajikistan by the Gissar Range (passes may be closed in winter). The southern part of the region is the east-west valley of the upper Zarafshan River. North, over the Turkestan Range, is the Ferghana Valley. The region has 29% of Tajikistan's population and one-third of its arable land. It produces two-thirds of the country's GDP.

== Economy ==
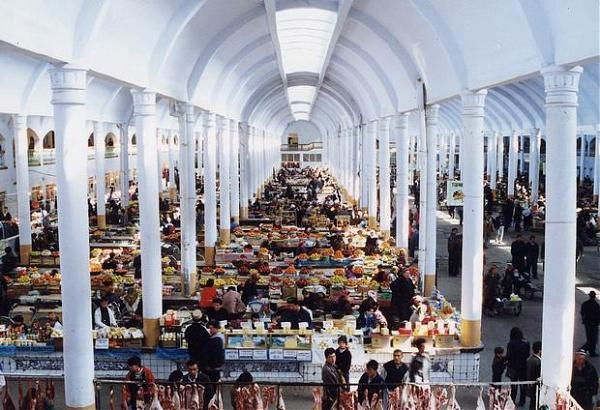
Indoor market in Khujand

The economy of Sughd has been growing steadily since 2000, at the average rate of 13.2% in 2008 and 13.3% in 2009. In 2009, farming, trade and industrial production contributed 28.2%, 25.8% and 14.0% to the GRP (gross regional product) of Sughd, respectively. Since 2000, the output of industrial production increased two-fold, at an average annual growth rate of 5–8%.

A free economic zone has been established in the region called Sughd Free Economic Zone.

== Demographics ==
Historical population
Year	Pop.	±% p.a.
1979	1,194,683	—
1989	1,558,158	+2.69%
1999	1,871,979	+1.85%
2010	2,233,550	+1.62%
2020	2,707,300	+1.94%
Source: Citypopulation

== Districts ==
The province is divided into 10 districts (Tajik: ноҳия, nohiya or Russian: район, raion) and 8 district-level cities. Furthermore, several cities (shahr) also cover other towns (shahrak) and rural localities. These are listed under "city districts".

=== Districts of Sughd ===
- Asht District
- Ayni District
- Devashtich District
- Ghafurov District
- Kuhistoni Mastchoh District
- Mastchoh District
- Spitamen District
- Jabbor Rasulov District
- Shahriston District
- Zafarobod District

=== City districts ===
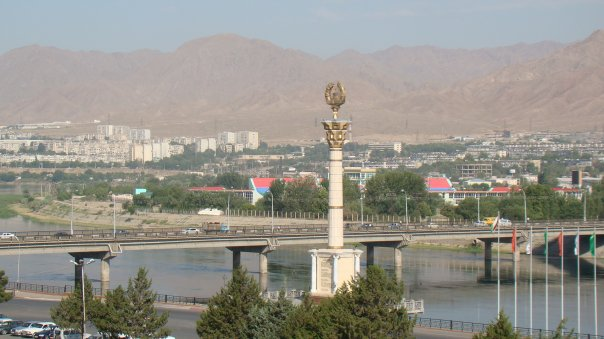
Khujand

Sughd province counts the following 8 district-level cities (with population estimate as of 2020):

- Khujand (Leninabad) (183,600)
- Buston (Chkalovsk) (34,000)
- Guliston (Kayrakkum) (18,000)
- Istiqlol (Taboshar) (17,600)
- Isfara (51,700)
- Istaravshan (Ura-Tyube) (65,600)
- Konibodom (52,500)
- Panjakent (43,300)

== Notable people ==
- Ruslan Ablayev (born 1972), Russian professional football coach and former player
- Lex Fridman (born 1983), host of the Lex Fridman podcast and Youtube series, researcher at MIT

== See also ==
- Yaghnobi people
- Yagnob Valley
- Extreme points of Tajikistan
