= List of populated places in Afyonkarahisar Province =

A list of populated places in Afyonkarahisar Province, Turkey by district:

== Afyonkarahisar (Central district) ==
- Afyonkarahisar
- Alcalı, Afyonkarahisar
- Anıtkaya, Afyonkarahisar
- Ata, Afyonkarahisar
- Bayatcık, Afyonkarahisar
- Bayramgazi, Afyonkarahisar
- Belkaracaören, Afyonkarahisar
- Beyyazı, Afyonkarahisar
- Bostanlı, Afyonkarahisar
- Halımoru, Afyonkarahisar
- Burhaniye, Afyonkarahisar
- Büyükkalecik, Afyonkarahisar
- Çakır, Afyonkarahisar
- Çavdarlı, Afyonkarahisar
- Çayırbağ, Afyonkarahisar
- Çıkrık, Afyonkarahisar
- Değirmenayvalı, Afyonkarahisar
- Değirmendere, Afyonkarahisar
- Demirçevre, Afyonkarahisar
- Erenler, Afyonkarahisar
- Erkmen, Afyonkarahisar
- Fethibey, Afyonkarahisar
- Gebeceler, Afyonkarahisar
- Gözsüzlü, Afyonkarahisar
- Işıklar, Afyonkarahisar
- İsmail, Afyonkarahisar
- Kaplanlı, Afyonkarahisar
- Karaarslan, Afyonkarahisar
- Kışlacık, Afyonkarahisar
- Kızıldağ, Afyonkarahisar
- Kozluca, Afyonkarahisar
- Köprülü, Afyonkarahisar
- Küçükçobanlı, Afyonkarahisar
- Küçükkalecik, Afyonkarahisar
- Nuribey, Afyonkarahisar
- Olucak, Afyonkarahisar
- Omuzca, Afyonkarahisar
- Saadet, Afyonkarahisar
- Sadıkbey, Afyonkarahisar
- Salar, Afyonkarahisar
- Saraydüzü, Afyonkarahisar
- Sarık, Afyonkarahisar
- Susuz, Afyonkarahisar
- Sülümenli, Afyonkarahisar
- Sülün, Afyonkarahisar
- Yarımca, Afyonkarahisar

== Bayat ==
- Bayat, Afyonkarahisar
- Akpınar, Bayat
- Aşağıçaybelen, Bayat
- Derbent, Bayat
- Eskigömü, Bayat
- Kuzören, Bayat
- Mallıca, Bayat
- Muratkoru, Bayat
- Sağırlı, Bayat
- Yukarıçaybelen, Bayat
- Çukurkuyu, Bayat
- İmrallı, Bayat
- İnpınar, Bayat

== Başmakçı ==
- Başmakçı, Afyonkarahisar
- Akkeçili, Başmakçı
- Akkoyunlu, Başmakçı
- Akpınar, Başmakçı
- Beltarla, Başmakçı
- Ekinlik, Başmakçı
- Hırka, Başmakçı
- Küllüce, Başmakçı
- Ovacık, Başmakçı
- Sarıköy, Başmakçı
- Yaka, Başmakçı
- Yassıören, Başmakçı
- Yukarıbeltarla, Başmakçı
- Çevlik, Başmakçı
- Çığrı, Başmakçı

== Bolvadin ==
- Bolvadin
- Büyükkarabağ, Bolvadin
- Derekarabağ, Bolvadin
- Dipevler, Bolvadin
- Dişli, Bolvadin
- Güney Bolvadin
- Güney, Bolvadin
- Hamidiye, Bolvadin
- Karayokuş, Bolvadin
- Kemerkaya, Bolvadin
- Kurucaova, Bolvadin
- Kutlu, Bolvadin
- Nusratlı, Bolvadin
- Ortakarabağ, Bolvadin
- Taşağıl, Bolvadin
- Taşlıdere, Bolvadin
- Yürükkaracaören, Bolvadin
- Özburun, Bolvadin

== Çay ==
- Çay
- Akkonak, Çay
- Armutlu, Çay
- Aydoğmuş, Çay
- Bulanık, Çay
- Cumhuriyet, Çay
- Deresinek, Çay
- Devederesi, Çay
- Eber, Çay
- Göcen, Çay
- Kadıköy, Çay
- Karacaören, Çay
- Karamık, Çay
- Kılıçkaya, Çay
- Kılıçyaka, Çay
- Koçbeyli, Çay
- Maltepe, Çay
- Orhaniye, Çay
- Pazarağaç, Çay
- Pınarkaya, Çay
- Yeşilyurt, Çay
- Çay, Afyonkarahisar
- Çayırpınar, Çay
- Çayıryazı, Çay
- İnli, Çay

== Çobanlar ==
- Çobanlar
- Akkoyunlu, Çobanlar
- Göynük, Çobanlar
- Kaleköy, Çobanlar
- Kocaöz, Çobanlar
- Çobanlar, Afyonkarahisar

== Dazkırı ==
- Dazkırı
- Akarca, Dazkırı
- Arıköy, Dazkırı
- Aşağıyenice, Dazkırı
- Bozan, Dazkırı
- Darıcılar, Dazkırı
- Hasandede, Dazkırı
- Hisaralan, Dazkırı
- Karaağaçkuyusu, Dazkırı
- Sarıkavak, Dazkırı
- Yaylaköy, Dazkırı
- Yukarıyenice, Dazkırı
- Yüreğil, Dazkırı
- Çiftlikköy, Dazkırı
- Örtülü, Dazkırı
- İdrisköy, Dazkırı

== Dinar ==
- Dinar, Afyonkarahisar
- Afşar, Dinar
- Akgün, Dinar
- Akpınarlı, Dinar
- Aktoprak, Dinar
- Akça, Dinar
- Akçin, Dinar
- Alacaatlı, Dinar
- Alparslan, Dinar
- Avdan, Dinar
- Bademli, Dinar
- Bağcılar, Dinar
- Belenpınar, Dinar
- Bilgiç, Dinar
- Burunkaya, Dinar
- Bülüçalan, Dinar
- Cerityaylası, Dinar
- Cumhuriyet, Dinar
- Dikici, Dinar
- Dombay, Dinar
- Doğanlı, Dinar
- Dumanköy, Dinar
- Eldere, Dinar
- Ergenli, Dinar
- Gençali, Dinar
- Gökçeli, Dinar
- Göçerli, Dinar
- Haydarlı, Dinar
- Kabaklı, Dinar
- Kadılar, Dinar
- Karabedir, Dinar
- Karahacılı, Dinar
- Karakuyu, Dinar
- Karataş, Dinar
- Kazanpınar, Dinar
- Keklicek, Dinar
- Kınık, Dinar
- Kızıllı, Dinar
- Körpeli, Dinar
- Muratlı, Dinar
- Ocaklı, Dinar
- Okçular, Dinar
- Palaz, Dinar
- Pınarlı, Dinar
- Sütlaç, Dinar
- Tatarlı, Dinar
- Tekin, Dinar
- Tuğaylı, Dinar
- Uluköy, Dinar
- Yakaköy, Dinar
- Yapağılı, Dinar
- Yelalan, Dinar
- Yeşilhüyük, Dinar
- Yeşilyurt, Dinar
- Yeşilçat, Dinar
- Yıprak, Dinar
- Yüksel, Dinar
- Çakıcı, Dinar
- Çamlı, Dinar
- Çapalı, Dinar
- Çayüstü, Dinar
- Çağlayan, Dinar
- Çiçektepe, Dinar
- Çobansaray, Dinar
- Çürüklü, Dinar

== Emirdağ ==
- Emirdağ
- Ablak, Emirdağ
- Adayazı, Emirdağ
- Alibeyce, Emirdağ
- Avdan, Emirdağ
- Ağılcık, Emirdağ
- Aşağıaliçomak, Emirdağ
- Aşağıkurudere, Emirdağ
- Aşağıpiribeyli, Emirdağ
- Bademli, Emirdağ
- Balcam, Emirdağ
- Bağlıca, Emirdağ
- Başkonak, Emirdağ
- Beyköy, Emirdağ
- Beyören, Emirdağ
- Burunarkaç, Emirdağ
- Büyüktuğluk, Emirdağ
- Camili, Emirdağ
- Davulga, Emirdağ
- Daydalı, Emirdağ
- Dağılgan, Emirdağ
- Dağınık, Emirdağ
- Demircili, Emirdağ
- Dereköy, Emirdağ
- Ekizce, Emirdağ
- Elhan, Emirdağ
- Emirinköyü, Emirdağ
- Eskiakören, Emirdağ
- Eşrefli, Emirdağ
- Gedikevi, Emirdağ
- Gelincik, Emirdağ
- Gökçeyaka, Emirdağ
- Gömü, Emirdağ
- Gözeli, Emirdağ
- Güneyköy, Emirdağ
- Güneysaray, Emirdağ
- Güveççi, Emirdağ
- Hamzahacılı, Emirdağ
- Hisar, Emirdağ
- Karaağaç, Emirdağ
- Karacalar, Emirdağ
- Karakuyu, Emirdağ
- Karayatak, Emirdağ
- Kılıçlar, Emirdağ
- Kılıçlı Kavlaklı, Emirdağ
- Kılıçlı kavlaklı, Emirdağ
- Kırkpınar, Emirdağ
- Kuruca, Emirdağ
- Leylekli, Emirdağ
- Salihler, Emirdağ
- Sığracık, Emirdağ
- Soğukkuyu, Emirdağ
- Suvermez, Emirdağ
- Tabaklar, Emirdağ
- Tepeköy, Emirdağ
- Tezköy, Emirdağ
- Toklucak, Emirdağ
- Topdere, Emirdağ
- Türkmen, Emirdağ
- Türkmenakören, Emirdağ
- Umraniye, Emirdağ
- Veysel, Emirdağ
- Y. kurudere, Emirdağ
- Yarıkkaya, Emirdağ
- Yarımca, Emirdağ
- Yavuz, Emirdağ
- Yenikapı, Emirdağ
- Yenikoy
- Yeniköy, Emirdağ
- Yukarıkurudere, Emirdağ
- Yusufağa, Emirdağ
- Yüreğil, Emirdağ
- Çatallı, Emirdağ
- Çaykışla, Emirdağ
- Çiftlik, Emirdağ
- Çiftlikköy, Emirdağ
- Örenköy, Emirdağ
- Özkan, Emirdağ
- İncik, Emirdağ

== Evciler ==
- Evciler, Afyonkarahisar
- Akyarma, Evciler
- Altınova, Evciler
- Baraklı, Evciler
- Bostancı, Evciler
- Gökçek, Evciler
- Körkuyu, Evciler
- Madenler, Evciler

== Hocalar ==
- Hocalar
- Akçadere, Hocalar
- Avgancık, Hocalar
- Davulga, Hocalar
- Devlethan, Hocalar
- Güre, Hocalar
- Kocagöl, Hocalar
- Kozluca, Hocalar
- Uluköy, Hocalar
- Yağcı, Hocalar
- Yeşilhisar, Hocalar
- Çalca, Hocalar
- Çepni, Hocalar
- Örencik, Hocalar
- Örtülü, Hocalar
- İhsaniye, Hocalar

== İhsaniye ==
- İhsaniye
- Ablak, İhsaniye
- Ayazini, İhsaniye
- Aşağıtandır, İhsaniye
- Basırlar, İhsaniye
- Bayramaliler, İhsaniye
- Beyköy, İhsaniye
- Bozhüyük, İhsaniye
- Cumalı, İhsaniye
- Demirli, İhsaniye
- Döğer, İhsaniye
- Eskieymir, İhsaniye
- Eynehankuzviran, İhsaniye
- Gazlıgöl, İhsaniye
- Gazlıgölakören, İhsaniye
- Hacıbeyli, İhsaniye
- Kadımürsel, İhsaniye
- Karacaahmet, İhsaniye
- Kayıhan, İhsaniye
- Kıyır, İhsaniye
- Muratlar, İhsaniye
- Orhanlı, İhsaniye
- Osmanköy, İhsaniye
- Oğulbeyli, İhsaniye
- Sarıcaova, İhsaniye
- Susuzosmaniye, İhsaniye
- Yenice, İhsaniye
- Yiğitpınarı, İhsaniye
- Yukarıtandır, İhsaniye
- Üçlerkayası, İhsaniye
- İğdemir, İhsaniye

== İscehisar ==
- İscehisar
- Alanyurt, İscehisar
- Bahçecik, İscehisar
- Cevizli, İscehisar
- Doğanlar, İscehisar
- Doğlat, İscehisar
- Karaağaç, İscehisar
- Karakaya, İscehisar
- Konarı, İscehisar
- Olukpınar, İscehisar
- Selimiye, İscehisar
- Seydiler, İscehisar
- Çalışlar, İscehisar
- Çatağıl, İscehisar

== Kızılören ==
- Kızılören
- Ekinova, Kızılören
- Gülyazı, Kızılören
- Türkbelkavak, Kızılören
- Yenibelkavak, Kızılören

== Sandıklı ==
- Sandıklı
- Akharım, Sandıklı
- Akın, Sandıklı
- Alacami, Sandıklı
- Alagöz, Sandıklı
- Alamescit, Sandıklı
- Arızlar, Sandıklı
- Asmacık, Sandıklı
- Ballık, Sandıklı
- Başağaç, Sandıklı
- Başkuyucak, Sandıklı
- Baştepe, Sandıklı
- Bektaşköy, Sandıklı
- Celiloğlu, Sandıklı
- Daylık, Sandıklı
- Dodurga, Sandıklı
- Dutağacı, Sandıklı
- Ekinhisar, Sandıklı
- Emirhisar, Sandıklı
- Gökçealan, Sandıklı
- Gürsu, Sandıklı
- Hırka, Sandıklı
- Karacaören, Sandıklı
- Karadirek, Sandıklı
- Karasandıklı, Sandıklı
- Kargın, Sandıklı
- Kınık, Sandıklı
- Kızık, Sandıklı
- Kızılca, Sandıklı
- Koçgazi, Sandıklı
- Koçhisar, Sandıklı
- Kusura, Sandıklı
- Kuyucak, Sandıklı
- Menteş, Sandıklı
- Nasuhoğlu, Sandıklı
- Odaköy, Sandıklı
- Otluk, Sandıklı
- Reşadiye, Sandıklı
- Saltık, Sandıklı
- Selçik, Sandıklı
- Sorkun, Sandıklı
- Soğucak, Sandıklı
- Susuz, Sandıklı
- Yanıkören, Sandıklı
- Yavaşlar, Sandıklı
- Yayman, Sandıklı
- Yolkonak, Sandıklı
- Yumurca, Sandıklı
- Çambeyli, Sandıklı
- Çevrepınar, Sandıklı
- Çiğiltepe, Sandıklı
- Çomoğlu, Sandıklı
- Çukurca, Sandıklı
- Örenkaya, Sandıklı
- Örmekuyu, Sandıklı
- Ülfeciler, Sandıklı
- Ürküt, Sandıklı
- Şeyhyahşi, Sandıklı

== Sinanpaşa ==
- Sinanpaşa
- Ahmetpaşa, Sinanpaşa
- Akdeğirmen, Sinanpaşa
- Akçaşar, Sinanpaşa
- Akören, Sinanpaşa
- Ayvalı, Sinanpaşa
- Balmahmut, Sinanpaşa
- Başkimse, Sinanpaşa
- Boyalı, Sinanpaşa
- Bulca, Sinanpaşa
- Düzağaç, Sinanpaşa
- Elvanpaşa, Sinanpaşa
- Garipçe, Sinanpaşa
- Gezler, Sinanpaşa
- Güney, Sinanpaşa
- Karacaören, Sinanpaşa
- Kayadibi, Sinanpaşa
- Kılıçarslan, Sinanpaşa
- Kınık, Sinanpaşa
- Kırka, Sinanpaşa
- Küçükhüyük, Sinanpaşa
- Nuh, Sinanpaşa
- Saraycık, Sinanpaşa
- Savran, Sinanpaşa
- Tazlar, Sinanpaşa
- Taşoluk, Sinanpaşa
- Tınaztepe, Sinanpaşa
- Tokuşlar, Sinanpaşa
- Yıldırımkemal, Sinanpaşa
- Yörükmezarı, Sinanpaşa
- Çalışlar, Sinanpaşa
- Çatkuyu, Sinanpaşa
- Çayhisar, Sinanpaşa
- Çobanözü, Sinanpaşa
- İğdeli, Sinanpaşa

== Şuhut ==
- Şuhut
- Akyuva, Şuhut
- Anayurt, Şuhut
- Arızlı, Şuhut
- Atlıhisar, Şuhut
- Aydın, Şuhut
- Ağzıkara, Şuhut
- Bademli, Şuhut
- Balçıkhisar, Şuhut
- Başören, Şuhut
- Bozan, Şuhut
- Dadak, Şuhut
- Demirbel, Şuhut
- Efe, Şuhut
- Güneytepe, Şuhut
- Hallaç, Şuhut
- Karaadilli, Şuhut
- Karacaören, Şuhut
- Karahallı, Şuhut
- Karlık, Şuhut
- Kavaklı, Şuhut
- Kayabelen, Şuhut
- Kılınçkaya, Şuhut
- Koçyatağı, Şuhut
- Kulak, Şuhut
- Mahmutköy, Şuhut
- Ortapınar, Şuhut
- Oynağan, Şuhut
- Paşacık, Şuhut
- Senirköyü, Şuhut
- TekkeKöyü, Şuhut
- Uzunpınar, Şuhut
- Yarışlı, Şuhut
- Çakırözü, Şuhut
- Çobankaya, Şuhut
- İcikli, Şuhut
- İlyaslı, Şuhut
- İsalı, Şuhut

== Sultandağı ==
- Sultandağı
- Akbaba, Sultandağı
- Dereçine, Sultandağı
- Doğancık, Sultandağı
- Karakışla, Sultandağı
- Karapınar, Sultandağı
- Kırca, Sultandağı
- Taşköprü, Sultandağı
- Yakasinek, Sultandağı
- Yenikarabağ, Sultandağı
- Yeşilçiftlik, Sultandağı
- Çamözü, Sultandağı
- Çukurcak, Sultandağı
- Üçkuyu, Sultandağı
