= Veysel =

Veysel (IPA: [veːˈsel]) is a Turkish given name for males.

Veysel may refer to:

== Places ==
- Veysel, Emirdağ, village in the District of Emirdağ, Afyonkarahisar Province, Turkey

== Persons ==
People named Veysel include:

- Veysel Aksu (born 1985), Turkish footballer
- Veysel Cihan, Turkish footballer
- Veysel Eroğlu, Turkish politician
- Veysel Özgür (1877-1931), officer of the Ottoman Army and the Turkish Army
- Veysel Sarı, Turkish footballer
- Veysel Şatıroğlu, (1894-1973) Turkish aşık and folk poet
- Veysel Turan (1901-2007), one of the last Turkish veterans of the Turkish War of Independence (1919-1923)
