= Elhan =

Elhan may refer to:

== People ==
- Elhan Kastrati (born 1997), Albanian footballer
- Elhan Rasulov (born 1960), Soviet and Azerbaijani footballer
- Ebru Elhan (born 1982), Turkish volleyball player

== Other uses ==
- Elhan, Emirdağ, village in Turkey
