= Güney (disambiguation) =

Güney is a town and district of Denizli Province, Turkey.

Güney is the Turkish word for "south" and may refer to:

== People ==
- Güney (name)

== Places ==
- Güney, Acıpayam
- Güney, Bolvadin, a village in the district of Bolvadin, Afyonkarahisar Province, Turkey
- Güney, Bozdoğan, a village in the district of Bozdoğan, Aydın Province, Turkey
- Güney, Burdur, a town in the Yeşilova district, Burdur Province, Turkey
- Güney, Çamlıdere, a village in the district of Çamlıdere, Ankara Province, Turkey
- Güney, Çorum
- Güney, İspir
- Güney, Mengen, a village in the District of Mengen, Bolu Province, Turkey
- Güney, Sinanpaşa, a village in the district of Sinanpaşa, Afyonkarahisar Province, Turkey
- Güney, Yığılca
