= Kırkpınar (disambiguation) =

Kırkpınar is a Turkish oil-wrestling tournament, held annually since 1346.

- Kırkpınar, Bayburt, a village in Bayburt Province, Turkey
- Kırkpınar, Dicle
- Kırkpınar, Korkuteli, a village in Antalya Province, Turkey
- Kırkpınar, Emirdağ, a village in Afyonkarahisar Province, Turkey
- Kırkpınar, Kayapınar
- Yusuf Kırkpınar (1949–2025), Turkish politician
