= Yukarıkurudere, Emirdağ =

Yukarıkurudere Kurudere
- Village
- Location within Turkey Location within Turkey Aegean
- Coordinates: 38°55′36″N 31°01′46″E
- Country: Turkey
- Province: Afyonkarahisar
- District: Emirdağ
- Established: 1796

Government
  - Muhtar: Remzi Çalışır
- Elevation: 1,267 m (4,157 ft)
- Population (2021): 487
- Time zone: UTC+3 (TRT)
- Postal code: 03630

Yukarıkurudere is a village in the Emirdağ District, Afyonkarahisar Province, Turkey. Its population is 487 (2021). Yukarıkurudere is located south of Mount Emirdağ, about 1276 meters above sea level. It is located at the Foothills of Dedeli mountain. The village includes 3 neighbourhoods: Palıtlı, Mazı and Mahrumlu.

The name Yukarıkurudere means Upper Dry Creek.

== History ==
In the past the village was united with Aşağıkurudere (Lower Dry Creek) but they split because of the distance between them. The name of the village before the split was Kurudere. Both Yukarıkurudere and Aşağıkurudere were established after 3 Yörük (Turkish nomadic) brothers migrated from Yozgat in 1796.

=== Emigration ===
The majority of the people emigrated to Europe from 1965 to 1990. Most moved to Belgium, while others landed in The Netherlands, Germany and France. The first to migrate to Europe was Hasan Palıt, followed by Gazi Palıt, also known as Gazi Hoca.

=== 2010 Derbent-Kurudere water crisis ===
When a water source was found between Yukarıkurudere and Derbent in 2010, both villages claimed the water source, launching a conflict. The court awarded the water source to Derbent. After this decision the Yukarikurudere village held a referendum in 2012 to join the Kemerkaya village so they could have access to water. The citizens voted "No" by four votes.

== Demographics ==
The village is an Oghuz village. The majority of the people are from the Morcalı tribe, which is a subtribe of the Avşar Tribe. They belong to the Bozulus tribal confederation.
