= Baraklı =

Baraklı can refer to:

- Baraklı, Evciler
- Baraklı, Keles
