= Çukurkuyu =

Çukurkuyu can refer to:

- Çukurkuyu, Bayat
- Çukurkuyu, Erzincan
- Çukurkuyu, Niğde
