= Gözeli =

Gözeli can refer to:

- Gözeli, Emirdağ
- Gözeli, Sivrice
