= Etsyena =

Town of ancient Phrygia

Coordinates: 38°59′26″N 30°55′41″E

Etsyena was a town of ancient Phrygia, inhabited during Roman times. Its name does not occur in ancient authors, but is inferred from epigraphic and other evidence.

Its site is located near Bayat in Asiatic Turkey.
