= Muratlı (disambiguation) =

Muratlı is a Turkish place name and it may refer to:

- Muratlı, a district in Tekirdağ Province
- Muratlı, Borçka a village in Borçka district of Artvin Province
- Muratlı, Dinar a village in Dinar district of Afyonkarahisar Province
- Muratlı, Karacabey a village in Karacabey district of Bursa Province
- Muratlı, Tarsus a village in Tarsus district of Mersin Province

== See also ==
- Muratlı Dam
