= İncik, Emirdağ =

İncik
- Neighbourhood
- Location in Turkey İncik (Turkey Aegean)
- Coordinates: 38.9894°N 31.3118°E
- Country: Turkey
- Province: Afyonkarahisar
- District: Emirdağ
- Municipality: Davulga
- Population (2021): 106
- Time zone: UTC+3 (TRT)

İncik is a neighbourhood of the town Davulga, Emirdağ District, Afyonkarahisar Province, Turkey. Its population is 106, as of 2021.
