= Gökçeyaka, Emirdağ =

Gökçeyaka
- Neighbourhood
- Country: Turkey
- Province: Afyonkarahisar
- District: Emirdağ
- Municipality: Gömü
- Population (2021): 87
- Time zone: UTC+3 (TRT)

Gökçeyaka is a neighbourhood of the town Gömü, Emirdağ District, Afyonkarahisar Province, Turkey. Its population is 87 (2021).
