= Evciler District =

- District
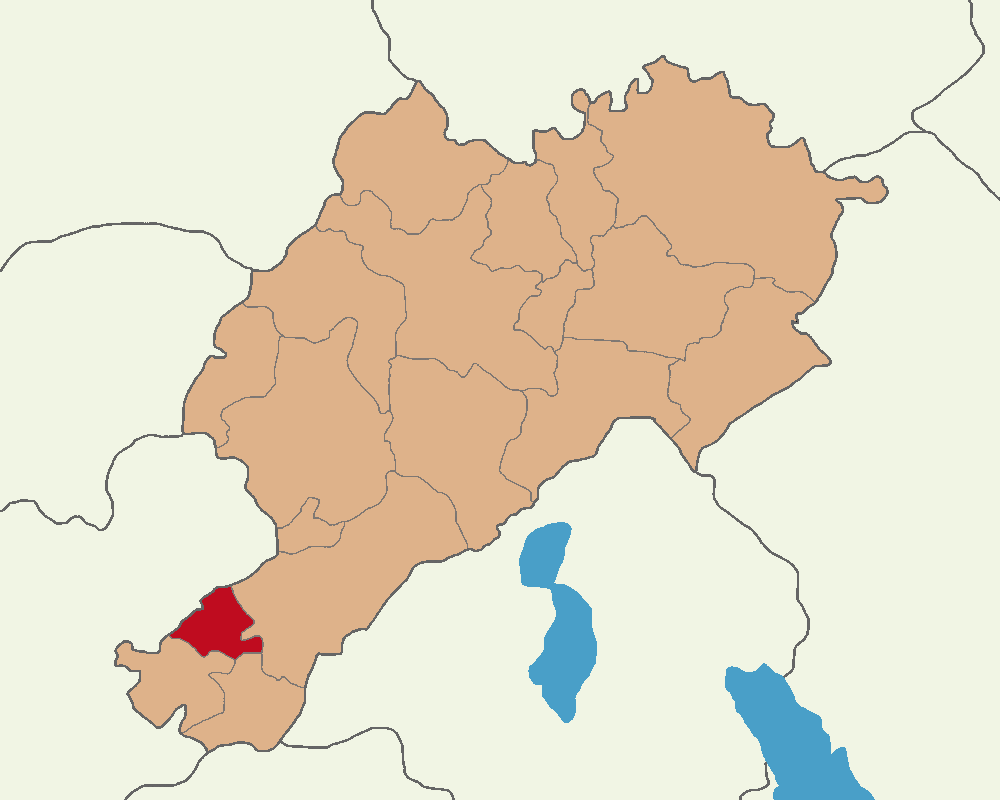
- Map showing Evciler District in Afyonkarahisar Province

- Location in Turkey Evciler District (Turkey Aegean)
- Coordinates: 38°02′N 29°53′E
- Country: Turkey
- Province: Afyonkarahisar
- Seat: Evciler
- Area: 252 km^{2} (97 sq mi)
- Population (2021): 7,183
  - Density: 28.5/km^{2} (73.8/sq mi)
- Time zone: UTC+3 (TRT)

Evciler District is a district of Afyonkarahisar Province of Turkey. Its seat is the town Evciler. Its area is 252 km^{2} (97 sq mi), and its population is 7,183 (2021). The district is near Lake Acıgöl and Işıklı reservoir. The average altitude is 981 m (3,219 ft).

== Composition ==
There is one municipality in Evciler District:

- Evciler

There are 7 villages in Evciler District:

- Akyarma
- Altınova
- Baraklı
- Bostancı
- Gökçek
- Körkuyu
- Madenler
