= Daydalı, Emirdağ =

Daydalı
- Village
- Location within Turkey Location within Turkey Aegean
- Coordinates: 39°02′N 31°20′E
- Country: Turkey
- Province: Afyonkarahisar
- District: Emirdağ
- Population (2022): 131
- Time zone: UTC+3 (TRT)
- Postal code: 03600

Daydalı is a village in the Emirdağ District, Afyonkarahisar Province, Turkey. Its population is 131 (2022). Daydalı is situated 88 km from the province capital Afyonkarahisar.

== Population ==
Historical population
Year	Pop.	±% p.a.
1997	68	—
2007	57	−1.75%
2012	52	−1.82%
2017	50	−0.78%
2022	131	+21.24%
Source: 1997 census and TÜIK (2007-2022)

== Infrastructure and facilities ==
Primary education is available in the village. It has a working drinking water network and a sewage network. There is a small health clinic, complicated healthcare is only available in larger cities like Emirdağ. The town has some asphalt roads and since 2014 there is WiFi available in the townhall.
