= Dereköy, Emirdağ =

Dereköy
- Village
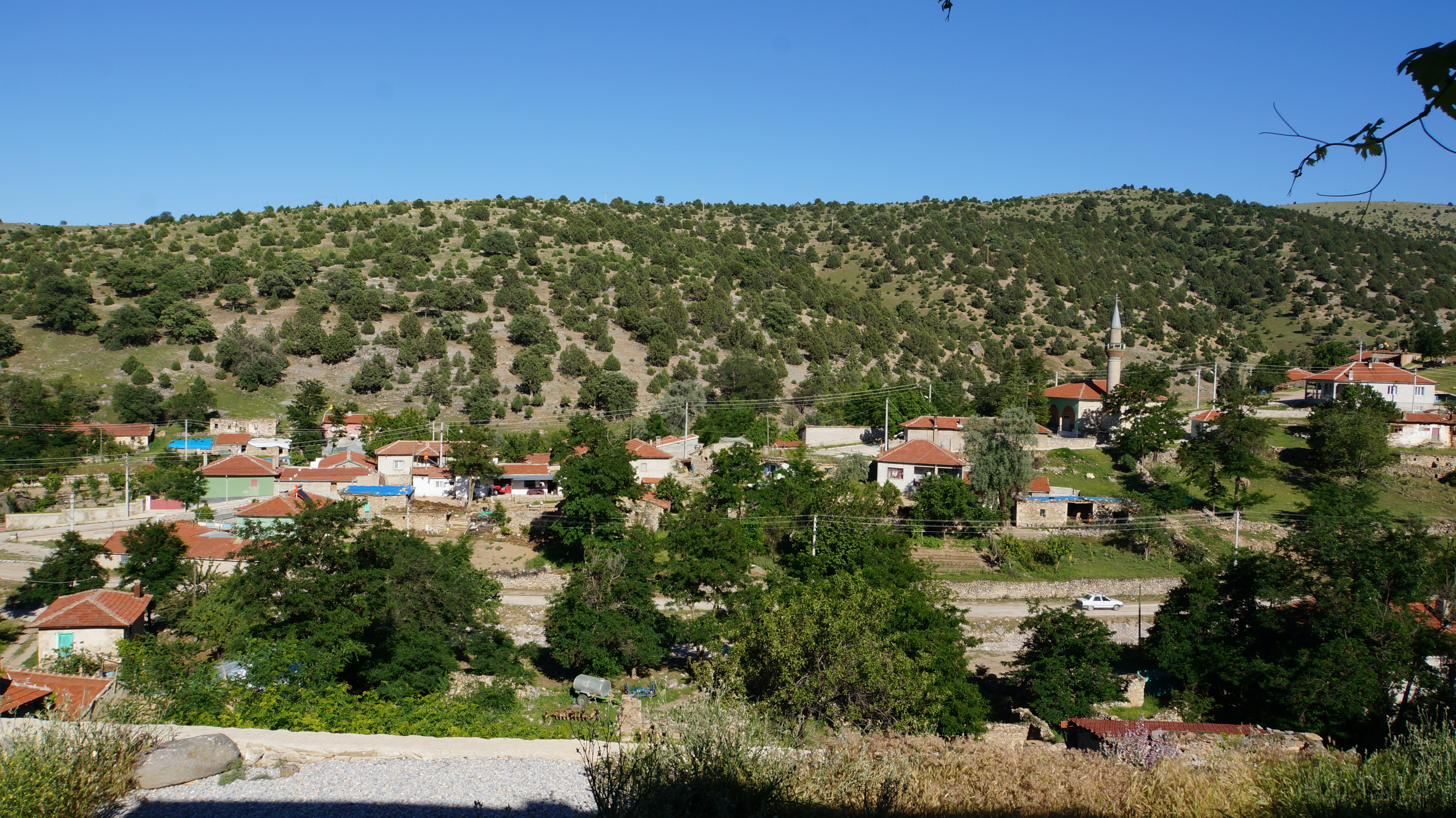

- Location within Turkey Location within Turkey Aegean
- Coordinates: 38.9706°N 31.1875°E
- Country: Turkey
- Province: Afyonkarahisar
- District: Emirdağ
- Population (2021): 227
- Time zone: UTC+3 (TRT)

Dereköy is a village in the Emirdağ District, Afyonkarahisar Province, Turkey. Its population is 227 (2021). The village takes its name from the creek which flows through it. The creek is usually dry, but when it rains heavily in the mountains, all the rain comes down through the creek.

== History ==
The village was founded by the Yörük people, who moved from the Yozgat district.

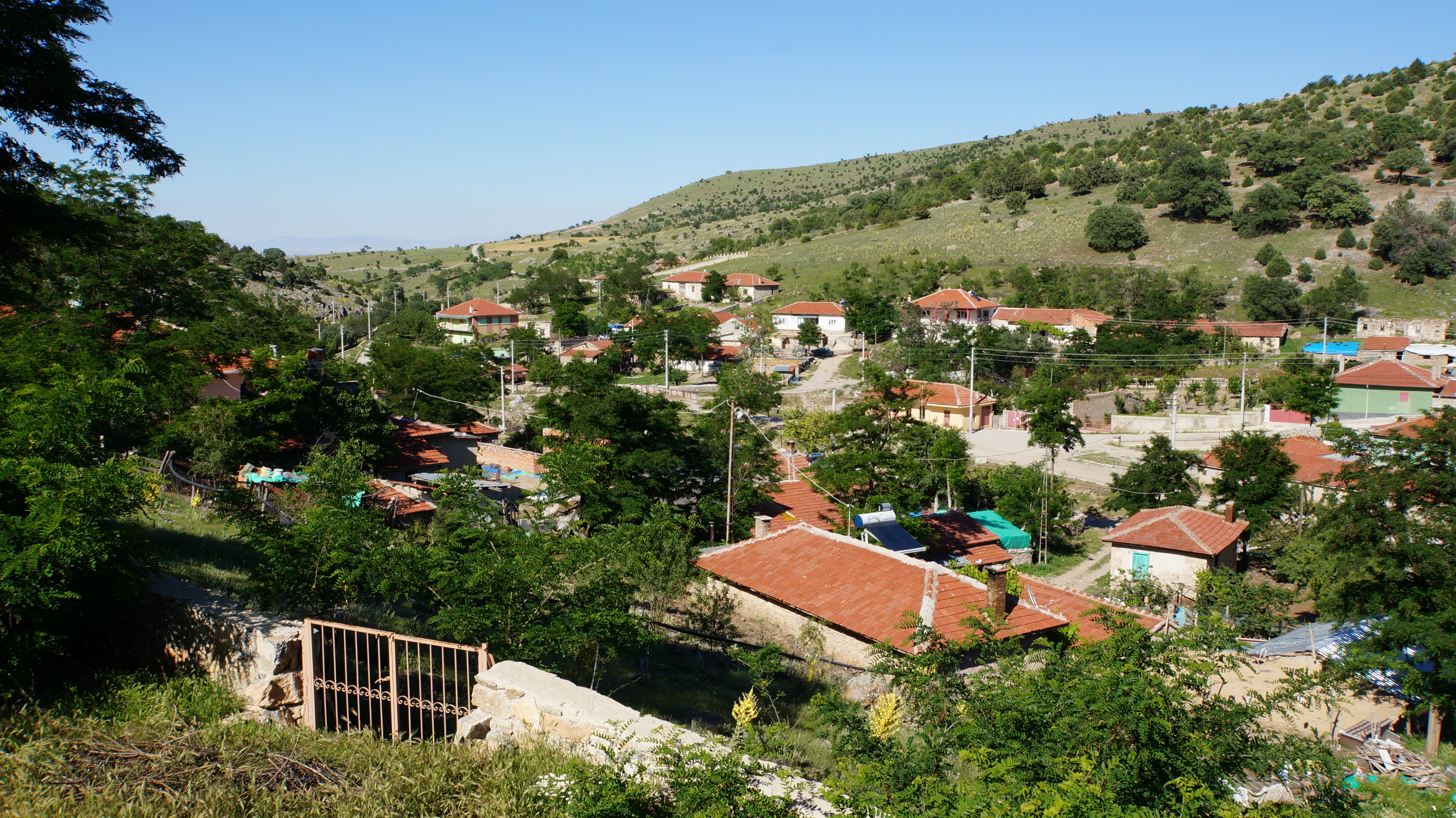
Image of Dereköy

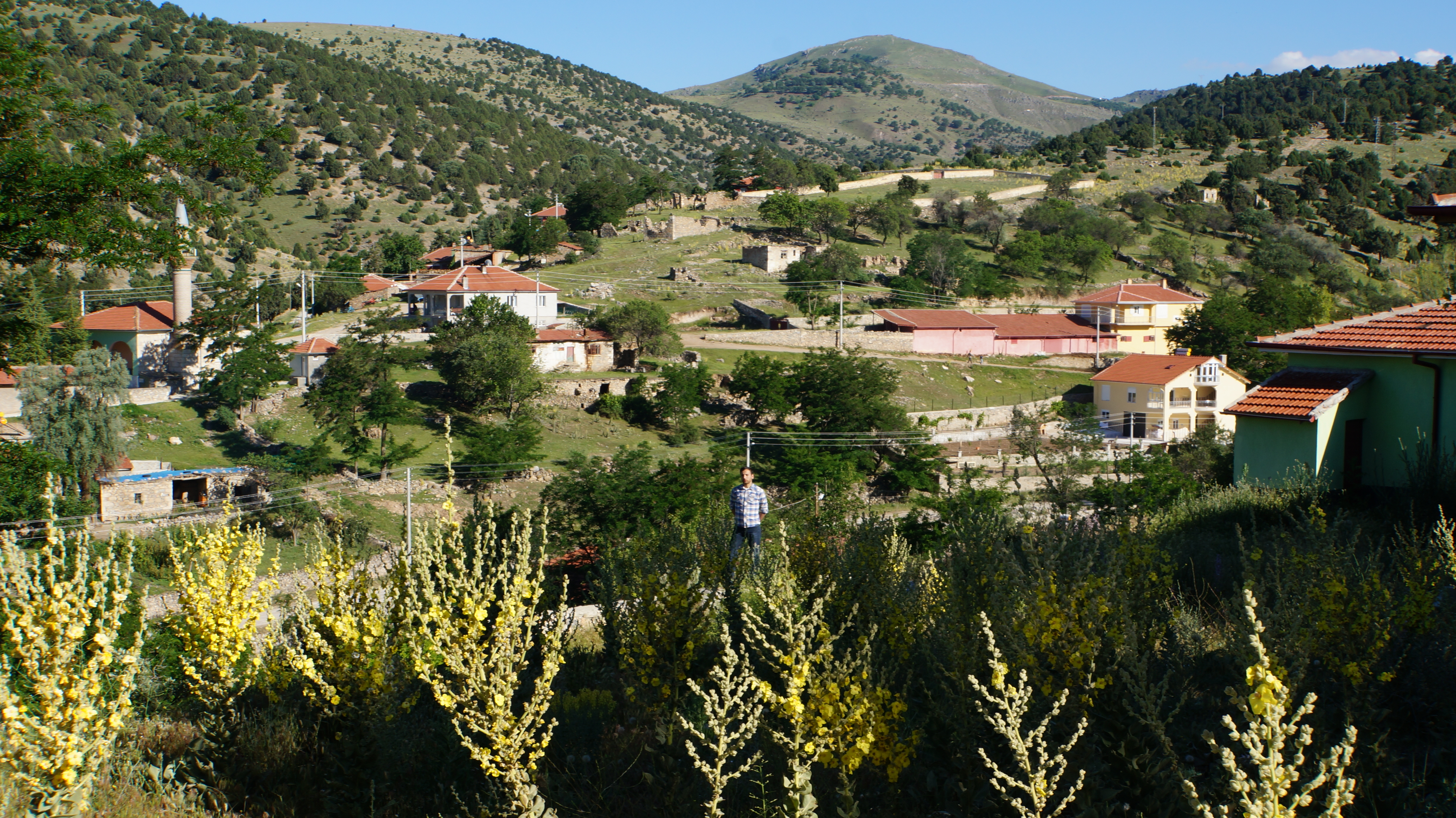
Image of Dereköy

== Geographic ==
The village lies 7 kilometers from Emirdağ and 77 kilometers from Afyonkarahisar.

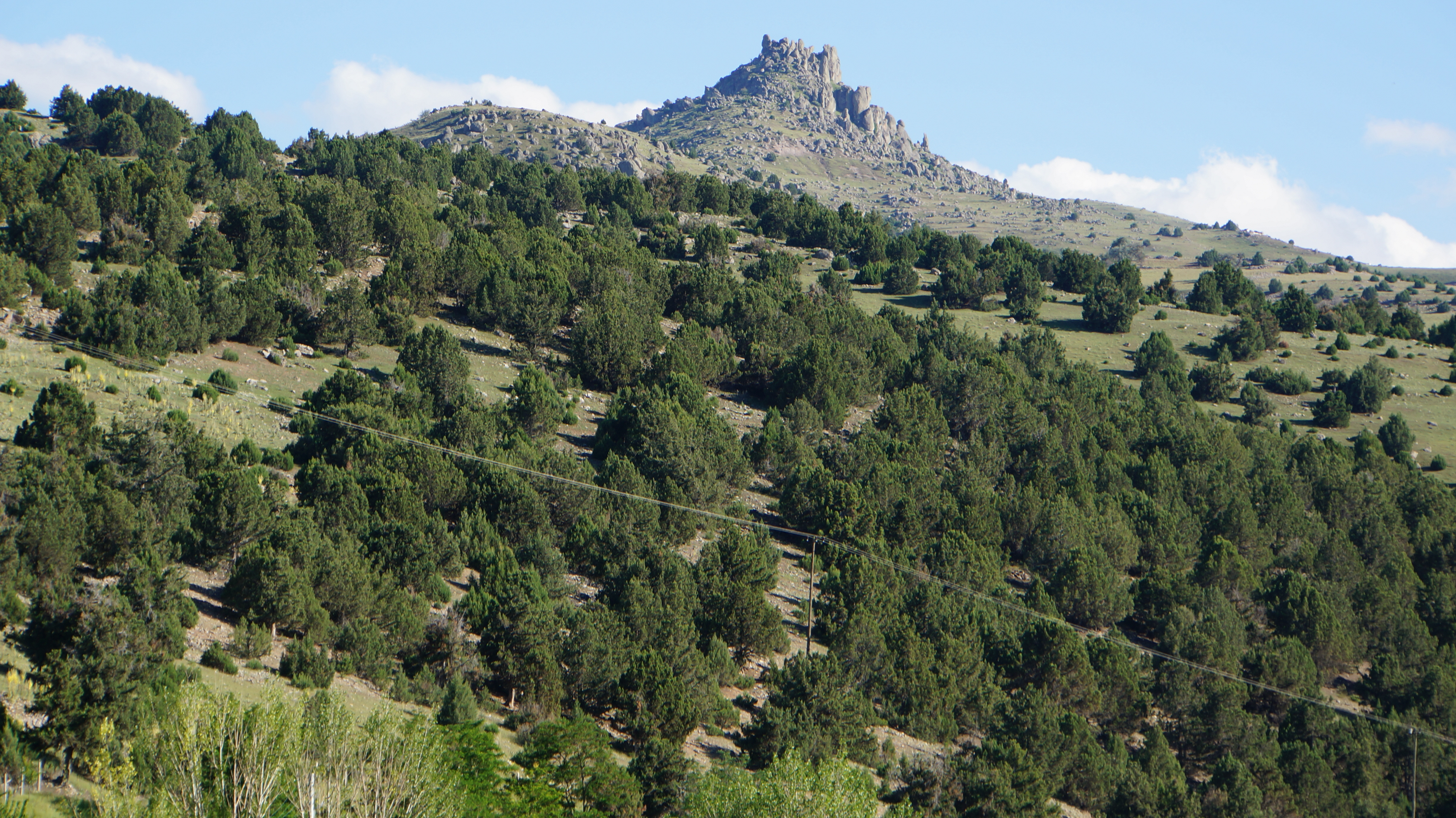
Image of Dereköy

== Economics ==
Most of the population are farmers.

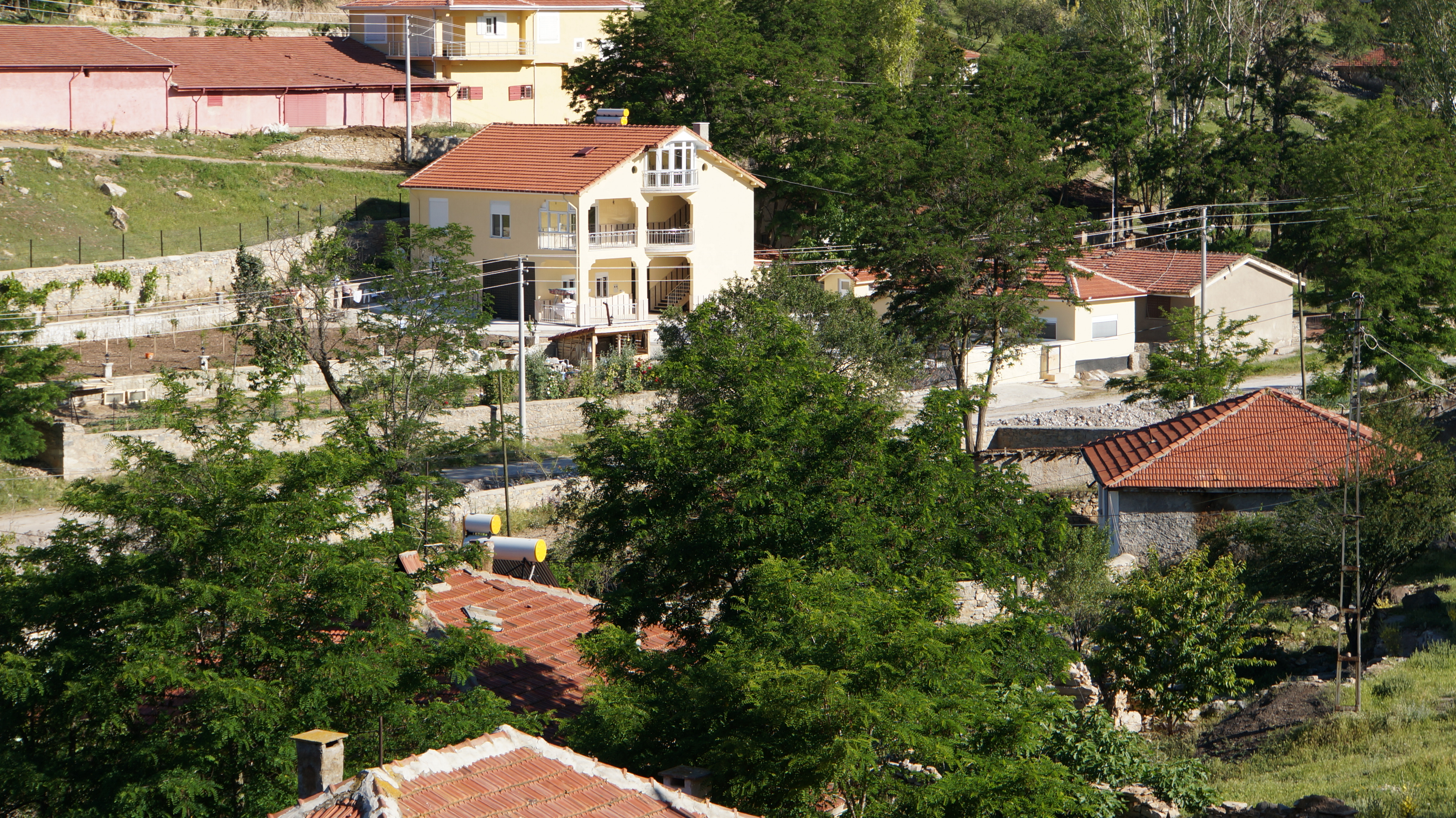
Image of Dereköy
