= Karakuyu, Emirdağ =

Karakuyu
- Neighbourhood
- Location in Turkey Karakuyu (Turkey Aegean)
- Coordinates: 38.9865°N 31.3360°E
- Country: Turkey
- Province: Afyonkarahisar
- District: Emirdağ
- Municipality: Davulga
- Population (2021): 182
- Time zone: UTC+3 (TRT)

Karakuyu is a neighbourhood of the town Davulga, Emirdağ District, Afyonkarahisar Province, Turkey. Its population is 182 (2021).
