= Bayat District, Afyonkarahisar =

Bayat District
- District
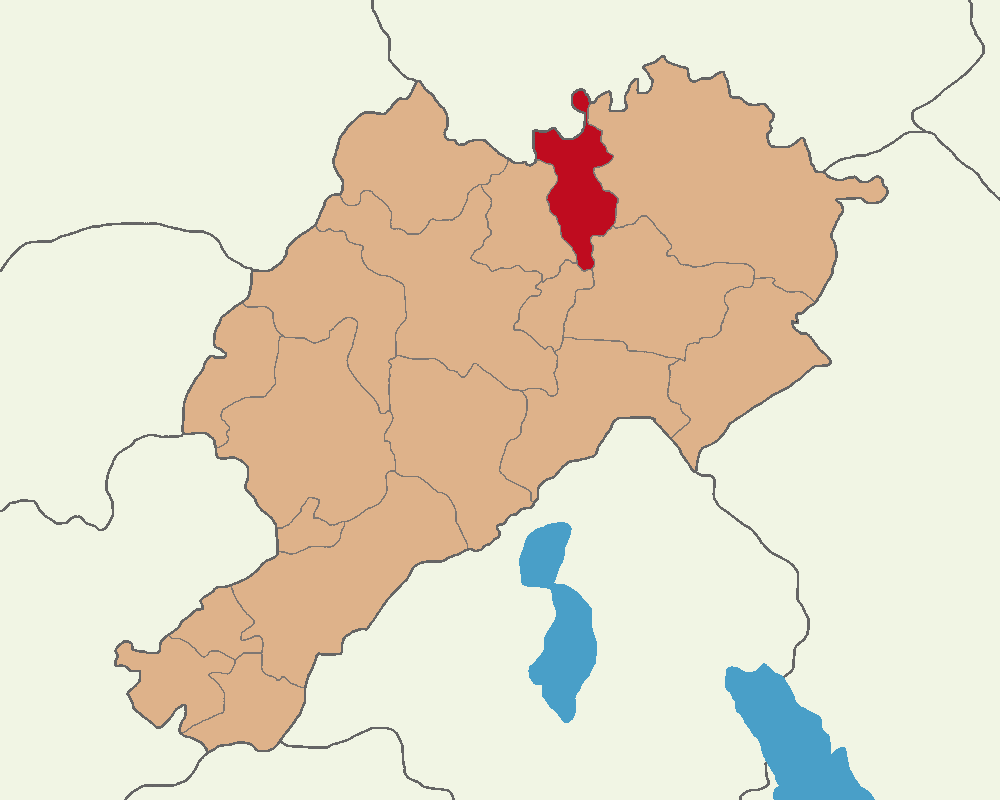
- Map showing Bayat District in Afyonkarahisar Province

- Location in Turkey Bayat District (Turkey Aegean)
- Coordinates: 38°59′N 30°55′E
- Country: Turkey
- Province: Afyonkarahisar
- Seat: Bayat

Government
  - Kaymakam: Halil İbrahim Acır
- Area: 411 km^{2} (159 sq mi)
- Population (2021): 7,687
  - Density: 18.7/km^{2} (48.4/sq mi)
- Time zone: UTC+3 (TRT)
- Website: bayat.gov.tr

Bayat District is a district of Afyonkarahisar Province of Turkey. Its seat is the town Bayat. Its area is 411 km^{2}, and its population is 7,687 (2021).

== Composition ==
There is one municipality in Bayat District:

- Bayat

There are 12 villages in Bayat District:

- Akpınar
- Aşağıçaybelen
- Çukurkuyu
- Derbent
- Eskigömü
- İmrallı
- İnpınar
- Kuzören
- Mallıca
- Muratkoru
- Sağırlı
- Yukarıçaybelen
