= Güney (name) =

Güney is a unisex Turkish given name. In Turkish, "Güney" means "south".

== People ==
=== Given name ===
- Güney Dal (born 1944), Turkish-German writer

=== Surname ===
- Alican Güney (born 1989), Turkish professional basketball player
- İsmet Güney (1932–2009), Cypriot artist
- Mehmet Güney (born 1936), Turkish judge
- Ramadan Güney (1932–2006), British-Turkish Cypriot businessman and politician
- Sadullah Güney (1883–1945), officer of the Ottoman Army and of the Turkish Army
- Salih Güney (born 1945), Turkish film actor
- Tuncay Güney (born 1972), Turkish spy
- Yusuf Güney (born 1984), Turkish singer
- Yılmaz Güney (1937–1984), Turkish film director
- Sinem Vatan Güney (born 1996), Turkish female handball player

== See also ==
- Güney (disambiguation)
