= Kızılören District =

- District
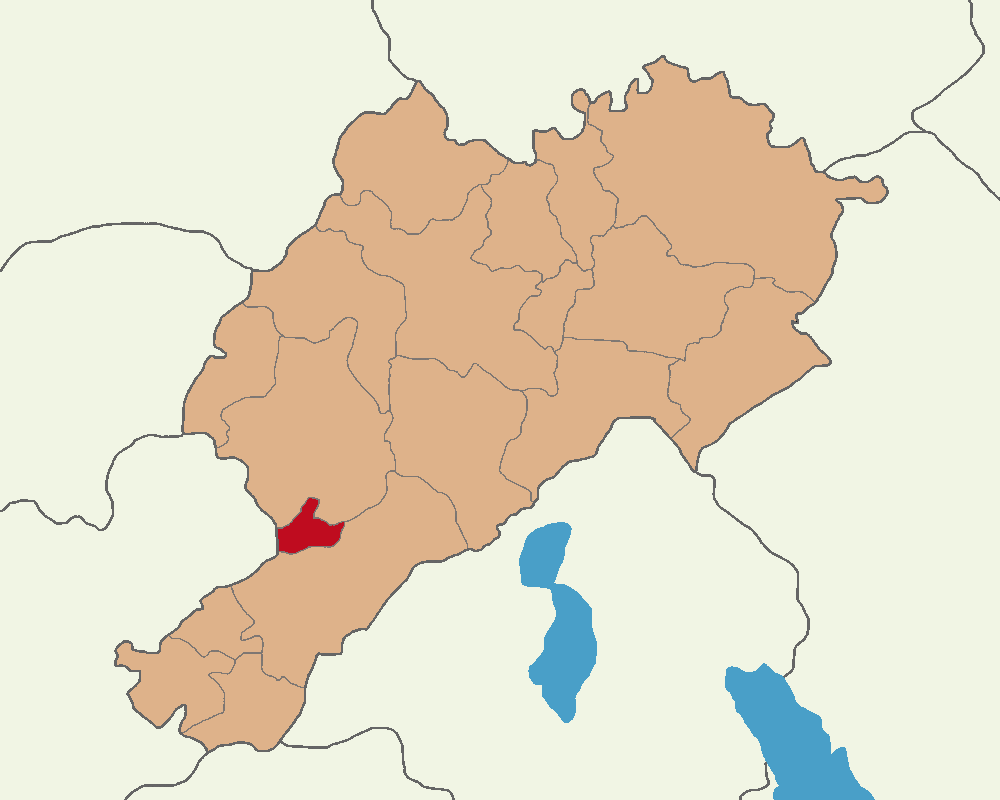
- Map showing Kızılören District in Afyonkarahisar Province

- Location in Turkey Kızılören District (Turkey Aegean)
- Coordinates: 38°15′N 30°09′E
- Country: Turkey
- Province: Afyonkarahisar
- Seat: Kızılören
- Area: 111 km^{2} (43 sq mi)
- Population (2021): 2,161
  - Density: 19.5/km^{2} (50.4/sq mi)
- Time zone: UTC+3 (TRT)

Kızılören District is a district of Afyonkarahisar Province of Turkey. Its seat is the town Kızılören. Its area is 111 km^{2}, and its population is 2,161 (2021).

== Composition ==
There is one municipality in Kızılören District:

- Kızılören

There are 4 villages in Kızılören District:

- Ekinova
- Gülyazı
- Türkbelkavak
- Yenibelkavak
