= Çalışlar, Sinanpaşa =

Coordinates: 38.8087°N 30.0431°E

Çalışlar
- Neighbourhood
- Location in Turkey Çalışlar (Turkey Aegean)
- Coordinates
- Country: Turkey
- Province: Afyonkarahisar
- District: Sinanpaşa
- Municipality: Güney
- Population (2021): 243
- Time zone: UTC+3 (TRT)

Çalışlar is a neighbourhood of the town Güney, Sinanpaşa District, Afyonkarahisar Province, Turkey. Its population is 243 (2021).
