= Akyarma, Evciler =

Akyarma
- Village
- Location within Turkey Location within Turkey Aegean
- Coordinates: 38°00′N 29°54′E
- Country: Turkey
- Province: Afyonkarahisar
- District: Evciler
- Population (2021): 274
- Time zone: UTC+3 (TRT)

Akyarma is a village in the Evciler District, Afyonkarahisar Province, Turkey. Its population is 274 (2021).
