= Güneyköy, Emirdağ =

Güneyköy
- Village
- Location within Turkey Location within Turkey Aegean
- Coordinates: 39.1369°N 30.9777°E
- Country: Turkey
- Province: Afyonkarahisar
- District: Emirdağ
- Population (2021): 26
- Time zone: UTC+3 (TRT)

Güneyköy (also: Güney) is a village in the Emirdağ District, Afyonkarahisar Province, Turkey. Its population is 26 (2021).
