= Leylekli, Emirdağ =

Leylekli
- Village
- Location within Turkey Location within Turkey Aegean
- Coordinates: 38°49′25″N 31°30′12″E
- Country: Turkey
- Province: Afyonkarahisar
- District: Emirdağ
- Population (2021): 19
- Time zone: UTC+3 (TRT)

Leylekli is a village in the Emirdağ District, Afyonkarahisar Province, Turkey. Its population is 19 (2021).
