= Gelincik, Emirdağ =

Gelincik
- Village
- Location within Turkey Location within Turkey Aegean
- Coordinates: 38.9342°N 31.4942°E
- Country: Turkey
- Province: Afyonkarahisar
- District: Emirdağ
- Population (2021): 74
- Time zone: UTC+3 (TRT)

Gelincik is a village in the Emirdağ District, Afyonkarahisar Province, Turkey. Its population is 74 (2021).
