= İhsaniye =

- Municipality
- Location within Turkey Location within Turkey Aegean
- Coordinates: 39°02′00″N 30°25′00″E
- Country: Turkey
- Province: Afyonkarahisar
- District: İhsaniye

Government
  - Mayor: Emine Gökçe (AKP)
- Elevation: 1,100 m (3,600 ft)
- Population (2024): 27,904
- Time zone: UTC+3 (TRT)
- Postal code: 03370
- Area code: 0272
- Climate: Csb
- Website: www.ihsaniye.bel.tr

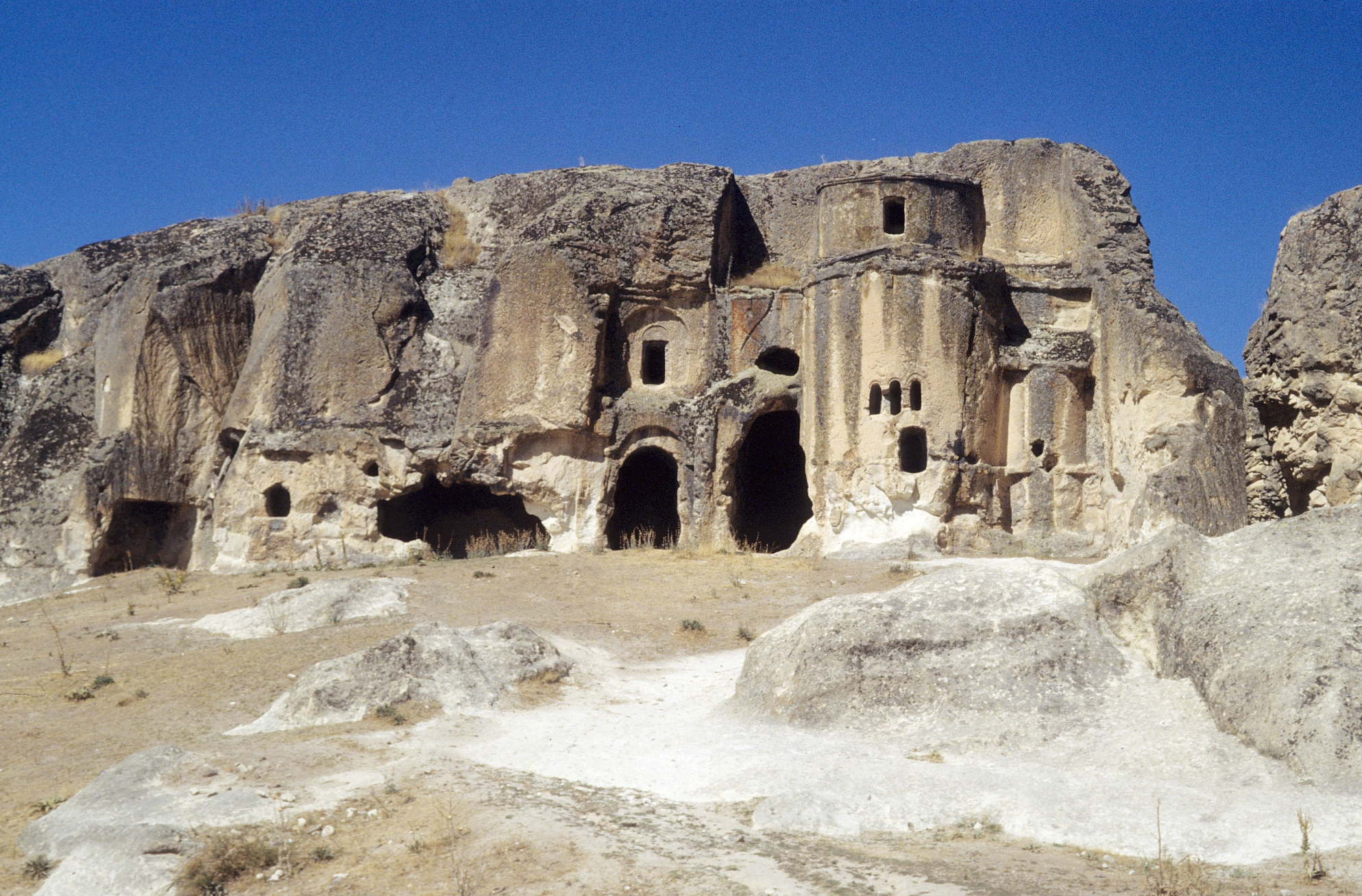
A photo of a monument in İhsaniye.

İhsaniye is a town of Afyonkarahisar Province in the Aegean region of Turkey. It is the seat of İhsaniye District. İhsaniye district has a total population of 27,904 according to the 2024 census. The mayor is Emine Gökçe (AKP). The town consists of 8 quarters: Cumhuriyet, Şahinler, Hürriyet, Zafer, Susuzosmaniye, Fatih, Yenikent and Akören.
