= Gökçek, Evciler =

Gökçek
- Village
- Location within Turkey Location within Turkey Aegean
- Coordinates: 38.0122°N 29.9569°E
- Country: Turkey
- Province: Afyonkarahisar
- District: Evciler
- Population (2021): 1,670
- Time zone: UTC+3 (TRT)

Gökçek is a village in the Evciler District, Afyonkarahisar Province, Turkey. Its population is 1,670 (2021). Before the 2013 reorganisation, it was a town (belde).
