= Örenköy, Emirdağ =

Örenköy
- Village
- Location within Turkey Location within Turkey Aegean
- Coordinates: 38.8486°N 31.5789°E
- Country: Turkey
- Province: Afyonkarahisar
- District: Emirdağ
- Population (2021): 208
- Time zone: UTC+3 (TRT)

Örenköy is a village in the Emirdağ District, Afyonkarahisar Province, Turkey. As of 2021, its population was 208.

== History ==
The name of the village is mentioned as Viran in the records of 1834.
