= Yeniköy, Emirdağ =

Yeniköy
- Village
- Location within Turkey Location within Turkey Aegean
- Coordinates: 39.0692°N 31.495°E
- Country: Turkey
- Province: Afyonkarahisar
- District: Emirdağ
- Population (2021): 447
- Time zone: UTC+3 (TRT)

Yeniköy is a village in the Emirdağ District, Afyonkarahisar Province, Turkey. Its population is 447 (2021).

It is a traditional Anatolian village. The head of local government (muhtar) is Abdil Koc (as of 2006).

== History ==
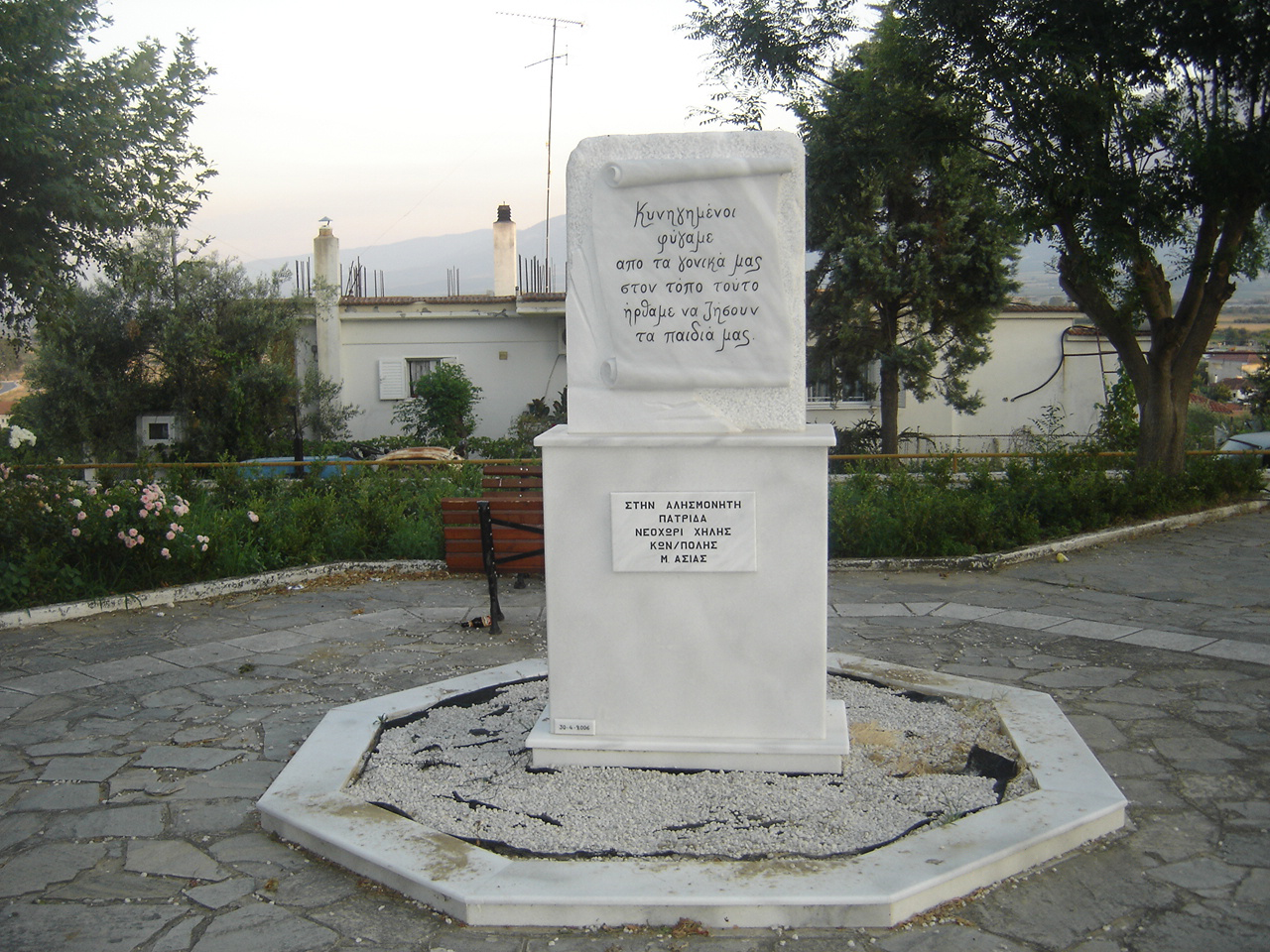
Memorial sculpture for the Greek people who fled Yenikoy in 1924 and came to Pieria, where their sons and daughters live today.

The village was established by Turkish emigrants from the Republic of Nagorno-Karabakh; they emigrated in the Ottoman Empire time and lived first in Davulga. After movings Sons of Alhan to valley of Yenikoy. Became yenikoy as a town.

Yenikoy was home to many Greek people in the 1920s. In 1924 following the dramatic events in the War of Asia Minor, the Greek people fled their village and came to stay in Kondariotissa, a town in Pieria in northern Greece. A memorial sculpture has been erected in the square of the Kondariotissa village, to commemorate the immigration of Greeks from Yenikoy (Νεοχώρι Χηλής in Greek) to Kondariotissa.

People from Kondariotissa that visit Yeniköy are welcomed with the friendship and hospitability of the residents and the local authorities of the Turkish town.
