= Susuzosmaniye, İhsaniye =

Coordinates: 38.9856°N 30.3560°E

Susuzosmaniye
- Neighbourhood
- Location in Turkey Susuzosmaniye (Turkey Aegean)
- Coordinates
- Country: Turkey
- Province: Afyonkarahisar
- District: İhsaniye
- Municipality: İhsaniye
- Population (2021): 54
- Time zone: UTC+3 (TRT)

Susuzosmaniye is a neighbourhood of the town İhsaniye, İhsaniye District, Afyonkarahisar Province, Turkey. Its population is 54 (2021).
