= Kılıçyaka, Çay =

Kılıçyaka
- Village
- Location within Turkey Location within Turkey Aegean
- Country: Turkey
- Province: Afyonkarahisar
- District: Çay
- Elevation: 1,081 m (3,547 ft)
- Population (2021): 246
- Time zone: UTC+3 (TRT)

Kılıçyaka is a village in the Çay District, Afyonkarahisar Province, Turkey. Its population is 246 (2021).

== History ==
The name of the village is mentioned as Kizan in records from 1928.
