= Başkonak, Emirdağ =

Başkonak
- Village
- Location within Turkey Location within Turkey Aegean
- Coordinates: 38.9750°N 31.1036°E
- Country: Turkey
- Province: Afyonkarahisar
- District: Emirdağ
- Population (2021): 486
- Time zone: UTC+3 (TRT)

Başkonak is a village in the Emirdağ District, Afyonkarahisar Province, Turkey. Its population is 486 (2021).
