= Davulga, Emirdağ =

Davulga
- Municipality
- Location in Turkey Davulga (Turkey Aegean)
- Coordinates: 38.9792°N 31.3714°E
- Country: Turkey
- Province: Afyonkarahisar
- District: Emirdağ
- Population (2021): 2,480
- Time zone: UTC+3 (TRT)

Davulga is a town (belde) and municipality in the Emirdağ District, Afyonkarahisar Province, Turkey. Its population is 2,480 (2021). It consists of 7 quarters: Alasakalli, Sofulu, Domurlu, Hisarköy, Karakuyu and İncik.

== Azeri settlements ==
According to Sevan Nişanyan's Index Anatolicus, several villages in the area of Davulga were originally Azeri (Karabağlı) settlements: İncik, Karakuyu, Daydalı, Davulga itself, Avdan, Eşrefli, Yeniköy, Gelincik (before 1928: Vahdetiye), Yarıkkaya and Aşağıaliçomak.
