= İnpınar, Bayat =

İnpınar
- Village
- Location within Turkey Location within Turkey Aegean
- Coordinates: 38.8705°N 30.9004°E
- Country: Turkey
- Province: Afyonkarahisar
- District: Bayat
- Population (2021): 104
- Time zone: UTC+3 (TRT)

İnpınar is a village in the Bayat District, Afyonkarahisar Province, Turkey. Its population is 104 (2021).
