= Ablak, Emirdağ =

Ablak
- Village
- Location within Turkey Location within Turkey Aegean
- Coordinates: 39.22835°N 31.19251°E
- Country: Turkey
- Province: Afyonkarahisar
- District: Emirdağ
- Population (2021): 80
- Time zone: UTC+3 (TRT)

Ablak is a village in the Emirdağ District, Afyonkarahisar Province, Turkey. Its population is 80 (2021).
