= Karacalar, Emirdağ =

Karacalar
- Village
- Location within Turkey Location within Turkey Aegean
- Coordinates: 38°58′N 31°14′E
- Country: Turkey
- Province: Afyonkarahisar
- District: Emirdağ
- Population (2021): 667
- Time zone: UTC+3 (TRT)

Karacalar is a village in the Emirdağ District, Afyonkarahisar Province, Turkey. Its population is 667 (2021).

The village was founded in the 1730s as Kiliççeken by Latif (his descendants named Latif uşakları/uşağı), it was later renamed Üç Kuyu, then in 1850 Karacalar.

== Population ==
Historical population
Year	Pop.	±% p.a.
1997	466	—
2000	474	+0.57%
2007	569	+2.64%
2021	667	+1.14%

== Migration ==
Many inhabitants from Karacalar migrated to Western Europe since the 1960s.

The reportedly first migrant from the Emirdag district to Belgium, in 1963, was 'Kötü Ahmet', Ahmet Öztürk, originally from Karacalar. In 2000 his son Mustafa Öztürk was elected as a municipal councillor in the Belgian commune of Schaerbeek.

The village head Nurettin Shahbaz, who was in charge for four mandates between 1984 and 2014, lived and worked himself in Belgium in 1973-1974 as a toiler in a cement factory in Ottignies. He came back after having lost two children in the fire of his housing in Brussels. Most of his brothers and sisters, and one of his sons, stayed in Belgium. The Shahbaz family is well known in the Turkish neighbourhood in Brussels (Schaerbeek and Saint-Josse-ten-Noode) as the Dede of the Karacalar Alevis has traditionally been one of his members.

== Village heads ==
List of the village heads ((in Turkish) Köy muhtar)

- Çolakoglu
- Seyıt Izcı
- Süleyman Bağseven 1938
- Bekir Şahbaz 1943
- Mehmet Kubat 1947
- Tahir Baş 1950
- Süleyman Sarıgöz 1959
- Mahmut Gökkaya 1964
- Muhittin Atmaca 1968
- Ahmet Baş 1973
- Latif Kahya 1977
- A. Nurettin Şahbaz 1984
- Tahir Atmaca 1989
- A. Nurettin Şahbaz 1994
- Dogan Polat 1999
- A. Nurettin Şahbaz 2004
- A. Nurettin Şahbaz 2009
- Ramazan Çandırli 2014
- Gökhan Turköz 2019
- Ramazan Kubat 2024

== Personalities from Karacalar ==
- Sait Köse, businessman, alderman in Schaerbeek (Belgium) since 2001
- Ahmet Öztürk "Kötü Ahmet"
- Ramazan Kubat, Turkish folk singer
