= Bostancı, Evciler =

Bostancı
- Village
- Location within Turkey Location within Turkey Aegean
- Coordinates: 38.1090°N 29.9615°E
- Country: Turkey
- Province: Afyonkarahisar
- District: Evciler
- Population (2021): 171
- Time zone: UTC+3 (TRT)

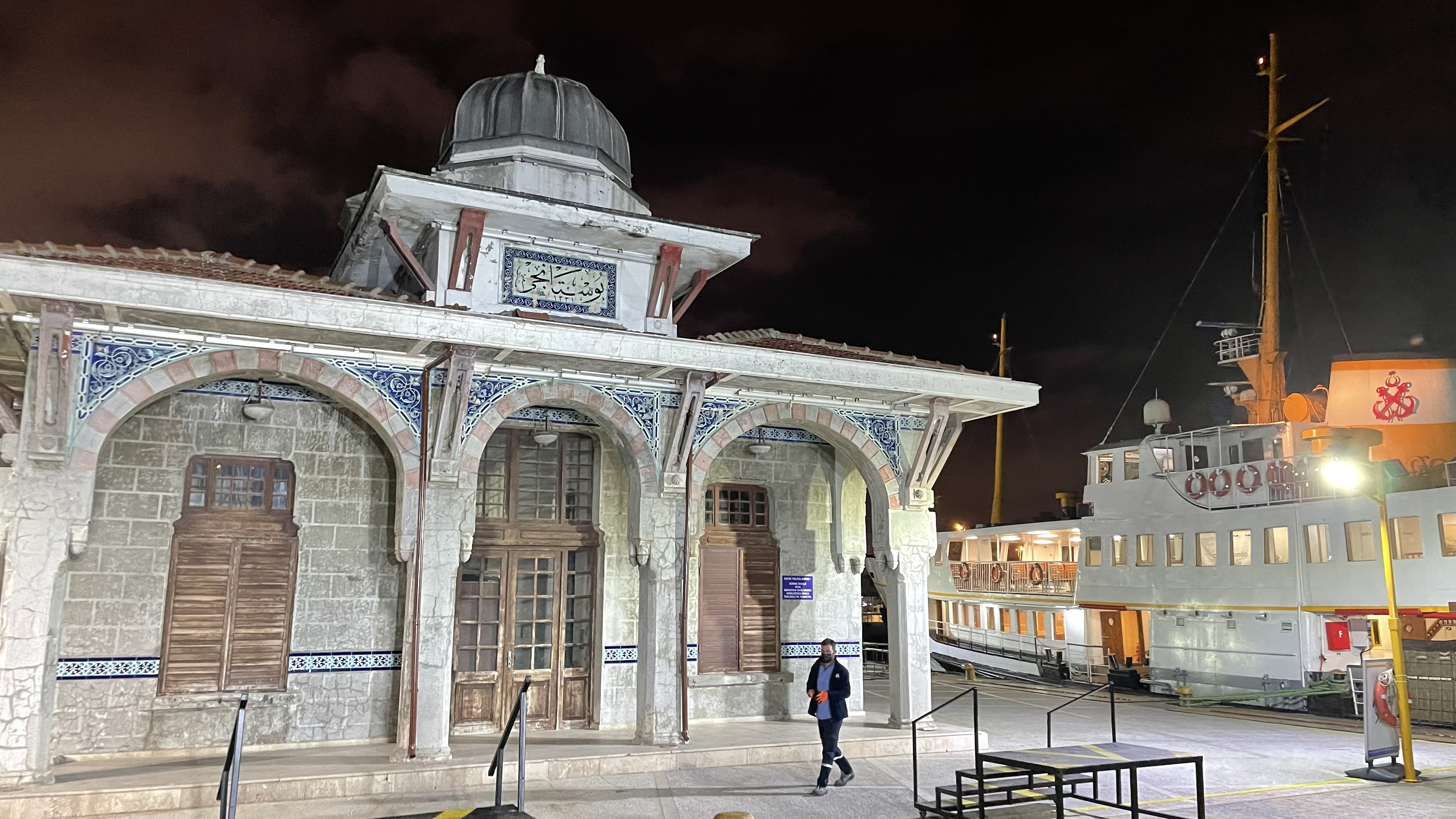
Bostancı Ferry Station

Bostancı is a village in the Evciler District, Afyonkarahisar Province, Turkey. Its population is 171 (2021).
