= Yukarıçaybelen, Bayat =

Yukarıçaybelen
- Village
- Location within Turkey Location within Turkey Aegean
- Coordinates: 38°50′N 30°55′E
- Country: Turkey
- Province: Afyonkarahisar
- District: Bayat
- Population (2021): 379
- Time zone: UTC+3 (TRT)

Yukarıçaybelen is a village in the Bayat District, Afyonkarahisar Province, Turkey. Its population is 379 (2021).
