= Mallıca, Bayat =

Mallıca
- Village
- Location within Turkey Location within Turkey Aegean
- Coordinates: 39.0906°N 30.8261°E
- Country: Turkey
- Province: Afyonkarahisar
- District: Bayat
- Population (2021): 120
- Time zone: UTC+3 (TRT)

Mallıca is a village in the Bayat District, Afyonkarahisar Province, Turkey. Its population is 120 (2021).
