= Kılıçlı Kavlaklı, Emirdağ =

Kılıçlı Kavlaklı
- Village
- Location within Turkey Location within Turkey Aegean
- Country: Turkey
- Province: Afyonkarahisar
- District: Emirdağ
- Population (2021): 67
- Time zone: UTC+3 (TRT)

Kılıçlı Kavlaklı is a village in the Emirdağ District, Afyonkarahisar Province, Turkey. Its population is 67 (2021).
