= Türkmen, Emirdağ =

Türkmen
- Village
- Location within Turkey Location within Turkey Aegean
- Coordinates: 38°56′00″N 31°17′20″E
- Country: Turkey
- Province: Afyonkarahisar
- District: Emirdağ
- Population (2021): 321
- Time zone: UTC+3 (TRT)

Türkmen (also: Türkmenköy) is a village in the Emirdağ District, Afyonkarahisar Province, Turkey. Its population is 321 (2021).
