= Topdere, Emirdağ =

Topdere
- Village
- Location within Turkey Location within Turkey Aegean
- Coordinates: 39°07′N 31°14′E
- Country: Turkey
- Province: Afyonkarahisar
- District: Emirdağ
- Population (2021): 33
- Time zone: UTC+3 (TRT)

Topdere is a village in the Emirdağ District, Afyonkarahisar Province, Turkey. Its population is 33 (2021).
