= Kılıçlar, Emirdağ =

Kılıçlar
- Village
- Location within Turkey Location within Turkey Aegean
- Coordinates: 39.1336°N 31.2750°E
- Country: Turkey
- Province: Afyonkarahisar
- District: Emirdağ
- Population (2021): 49
- Time zone: UTC+3 (TRT)

Kılıçlar is a village in the Emirdağ District, Afyonkarahisar Province, Turkey. Its population is 49 (2021).
