= Dağınık, Emirdağ =

Dağınık
- Village
- Location within Turkey Location within Turkey Aegean
- Coordinates: 39°09′N 31°12′E
- Country: Turkey
- Province: Afyonkarahisar
- District: Emirdağ
- Population (2021): 39
- Time zone: UTC+3 (TRT)

Dağınık is a village in the Emirdağ District, Afyonkarahisar Province, Turkey. Its population is 39 (2021).
