= Karaağaç, Emirdağ =

Karaağaç
- Village
- Location within Turkey Location within Turkey Aegean
- Coordinates: 39.0684°N 31.1583°E
- Country: Turkey
- Province: Afyonkarahisar
- District: Emirdağ
- Population (2021): 145
- Time zone: UTC+3 (TRT)

Karaağaç is a village in the Emirdağ District, Afyonkarahisar Province, Turkey. Its population is 145 (2021).
