= Veysel Aksu =

Turkish professional footballer

Personal information
- Date of birth: 1 January 1985 (age 41)
- Place of birth: Manisa
- Height: 1.84 m (6 ft 0 in)
- Position: Defender

Team information
- Current team: Tirespor

Senior career*
Years	Team	Apps	(Gls)
2006	Kayserispor	2	
2008–2009	Samsunspor	22	
2009–2010	Siirtspor		
2010–2012	Elazığspor	34	(2)
2012–2013	Erciyesspor	25	(0)
2013–2014	Medipol Başakşehir	9	(0)
2014–2015	Giresunspor	12	(1)
2015–2016	Şanlıurfaspor	11	(0)
2016	Bayrampaşaspor	2	(0)
2016–2017	Keçiörengücü	6	(0)
2017–	Tirespor	5	(0)
- * Club domestic league appearances and goals as of 12 December 2017

Veysel Aksu (born 1 January 1985) is a Turkish professional footballer who plays as a defender for Tirespor.
