= Bademli, Emirdağ =

Bademli
- Village
- Location within Turkey Location within Turkey Aegean
- Coordinates: 38.9403°N 31.4019°E
- Country: Turkey
- Province: Afyonkarahisar
- District: Emirdağ
- Population (2021): 435
- Time zone: UTC+3 (TRT)

Bademli is a village in the Emirdağ District, Afyonkarahisar Province, Turkey. Its population is 435 (2021). Before the 2013 reorganisation, it was a town (belde).
