= Yusufağa, Emirdağ =

Yusufağa
- Village
- Location within Turkey Location within Turkey Aegean
- Coordinates: 39.1964°N 31.1664°E
- Country: Turkey
- Province: Afyonkarahisar
- District: Emirdağ
- Population (2021): 64
- Time zone: UTC+3 (TRT)

Yusufağa is a village in the Emirdağ District, Afyonkarahisar Province, Turkey. Its population is 64 (2021).

The village was founded in 1901 by Bulgarian emigrants.
