= Karayatak, Emirdağ =

Karayatak
- Village
- Location within Turkey Location within Turkey Aegean
- Coordinates: 39.1000°N 31.2878°E
- Country: Turkey
- Province: Afyonkarahisar
- District: Emirdağ
- Population (2021): 60
- Time zone: UTC+3 (TRT)

Karayatak is a village in the Emirdağ District, Afyonkarahisar Province, Turkey. Its population is 60 (2021).
