= Demircili, Emirdağ =

Demircili
- Village
- Location within Turkey Location within Turkey Aegean
- Coordinates: 38.9697°N 31.2875°E
- Country: Turkey
- Province: Afyonkarahisar
- District: Emirdağ
- Population (2021): 286
- Time zone: UTC+3 (TRT)

Demircili is a village in the Emirdağ District, Afyonkarahisar Province, Turkey. Its population is 286 (2021).
