= Yarımca, Emirdağ =

Yarımca
- Village
- Location within Turkey Location within Turkey Aegean
- Coordinates: 39.0836°N 31.1419°E
- Country: Turkey
- Province: Afyonkarahisar
- District: Emirdağ
- Population (2021): 71
- Time zone: UTC+3 (TRT)

Yarımca is a village that is located in the Emirdağ District, Afyonkarahisar Province, Turkey. Its population is 71 (2021). It was once the home to author Halife Altay.
