= Akören, İhsaniye =

Coordinates: 38.9932°N 30.4482°E

Akören
- Neighbourhood
- Location in Turkey Akören (Turkey Aegean)
- Coordinates
- Country: Turkey
- Province: Afyonkarahisar
- District: İhsaniye
- Municipality: İhsaniye
- Population (2021): 364
- Time zone: UTC+3 (TRT)

Akören (formerly: Gazlıgölakören) is a neighbourhood of the town İhsaniye, İhsaniye District, Afyonkarahisar Province, Turkey. Its population is 364 (2021). Before the 2013 reorganisation, it was a town (belde).
