= Körkuyu, Evciler =

Körkuyu
- Village
- Location within Turkey Location within Turkey Aegean
- Country: Turkey
- Province: Afyonkarahisar
- District: Evciler
- Population (2021): 152
- Time zone: UTC+3 (TRT)

Körkuyu is a village in the Evciler District, Afyonkarahisar Province, Turkey. Its population is 152 (2021).
