= Beyköy, Emirdağ =

Beyköy
- Village
- Location within Turkey Location within Turkey Aegean
- Coordinates: 39.1229°N 31.0550°E
- Country: Turkey
- Province: Afyonkarahisar
- District: Emirdağ
- Population (2021): 45
- Time zone: UTC+3 (TRT)

Beyköy is a village in the Emirdağ District, Afyonkarahisar Province, Turkey. Its population is 45 (2021).
