= Ekizce, Emirdağ =

Ekizce
- Village
- Location within Turkey Location within Turkey Aegean
- Coordinates: 39.0452°N 31.2458°E
- Country: Turkey
- Province: Afyonkarahisar
- District: Emirdağ
- Population (2021): 379
- Time zone: UTC+3 (TRT)
- Website: www.ekizceliler.com

Ekizce is a village in the Emirdağ District, Afyonkarahisar Province, Turkey. Its population is 379 (2021).
