= Avdan, Emirdağ =

Avdan
- Village
- Location within Turkey Location within Turkey Aegean
- Coordinates: 38.9383°N 31.4416°E
- Country: Turkey
- Province: Afyonkarahisar
- District: Emirdağ
- Population (2021): 23
- Time zone: UTC+3 (TRT)

Avdan is a village in the Emirdağ District, Afyonkarahisar Province, Turkey. Its population is 23 (2021).
