= Tabaklar, Emirdağ =

Tabaklar
- Village
- Location within Turkey Location within Turkey Aegean
- Coordinates: 39.0495°N 31.0974°E
- Country: Turkey
- Province: Afyonkarahisar
- District: Emirdağ
- Population (2021): 309
- Time zone: UTC+3 (TRT)

Tabaklar is a village in the Emirdağ District, Afyonkarahisar Province, Turkey. Its population is 309 (2021).
