= Adayazı, Emirdağ =

Adayazı
- Village
- Location within Turkey Location within Turkey Aegean
- Coordinates: 39.06329°N 31.27265°E
- Country: Turkey
- Province: Afyonkarahisar
- District: Emirdağ
- Population (2021): 938
- Time zone: UTC+3 (TRT)

Adayazı is a village in the Emirdağ District, Afyonkarahisar Province, Turkey. Its population is 938 (2021). Before the 2013 reorganisation, it was a town (belde).
