= Bağlıca, Emirdağ =

Bağlıca
- Village
- Location within Turkey Location within Turkey Aegean
- Coordinates: 39.1739°N 31.0707°E
- Country: Turkey
- Province: Afyonkarahisar
- District: Emirdağ
- Population (2021): 133
- Time zone: UTC+3 (TRT)

Bağlıca is a village in the Emirdağ District, Afyonkarahisar Province, Turkey. Its population is 133 (2021).
