= Kuruca, Emirdağ =

Kuruca
- Village
- Location within Turkey Location within Turkey Aegean
- Coordinates: 39.0953°N 31.1806°E
- Country: Turkey
- Province: Afyonkarahisar
- District: Emirdağ
- Population (2021): 89
- Time zone: UTC+3 (TRT)

Kuruca is a village in the Emirdağ District, Afyonkarahisar Province, Turkey. Its population is 89 (2021).
