= Ocaklı, Dinar =

Coordinates: 38.2300°N 30.3585°E

Ocaklı
- Neighbourhood
- Location in Turkey Ocaklı (Turkey Aegean)
- Coordinates
- Country: Turkey
- Province: Afyonkarahisar
- District: Dinar
- Municipality: Haydarlı
- Population (2021): 340
- Time zone: UTC+3 (TRT)
- Postal code: 03402

Ocaklı is a neighbourhood of the town of Haydarlı, Dinar District, Afyonkarahisar Province in Turkey. Its population is 340 (2021).
