= Camili, Emirdağ =

Camili
- Village
- Location within Turkey Location within Turkey Aegean
- Coordinates: 39.1972°N 31.3009°E
- Country: Turkey
- Province: Afyonkarahisar
- District: Emirdağ
- Population (2021): 68
- Time zone: UTC+3 (TRT)

Camili is a village in the Emirdağ District, Afyonkarahisar Province, Turkey. Its population is 68 (2021).
