= Güveççi, Emirdağ =

Güveççi
- Village
- Location within Turkey Location within Turkey Aegean
- Coordinates: 38.9071°N 31.2978°E
- Country: Turkey
- Province: Afyonkarahisar
- District: Emirdağ
- Population (2021): 569
- Time zone: UTC+3 (TRT)

Güveççi is a village in the Emirdağ District, Afyonkarahisar Province, Turkey. Its population is 569 (2021).
