= Eskigömü, Bayat =

Eskigömü
- Village
- Location within Turkey Location within Turkey Aegean
- Coordinates: 39°04′N 30°59′E
- Country: Turkey
- Province: Afyonkarahisar
- District: Bayat
- Population (2021): 71
- Time zone: UTC+3 (TRT)

Eskigömü is a village in the Bayat District, Afyonkarahisar Province, Turkey. Its population is 71 (2021).
