= Yavuz, Emirdağ =

Yavuz
- Village
- Location within Turkey Location within Turkey Aegean
- Coordinates: 39.0017°N 31.2115°E
- Country: Turkey
- Province: Afyonkarahisar
- District: Emirdağ
- Population (2021): 85
- Time zone: UTC+3 (TRT)

Yavuz is a village in the Emirdağ District, Afyonkarahisar Province, Turkey. Its population is 92 (2025).
