= Çatallı, Emirdağ =

Çatallı
- Village
- Location within Turkey Location within Turkey Aegean
- Coordinates: 38.9333°N 31.1333°E
- Country: Turkey
- Province: Afyonkarahisar
- District: Emirdağ
- Population (2021): 386
- Time zone: UTC+3 (TRT)

Çatallı is a village in the Emirdağ District, Afyonkarahisar Province, Turkey. Its population is 386 (2021).
