= Özkan, Emirdağ =

Özkan
- Village
- Location within Turkey Location within Turkey Aegean
- Coordinates: 39°00′N 31°39′E
- Country: Turkey
- Province: Afyonkarahisar
- District: Emirdağ
- Population (2021): 162
- Time zone: UTC+3 (TRT)

Özkan is a village in the Emirdağ District, Afyonkarahisar Province, Turkey. Its population is 162 (2021).
