= Güneysaray, Emirdağ =

Güneysaray
- Village
- Location within Turkey Location within Turkey Aegean
- Coordinates: 38.9953°N 31.0561°E
- Country: Turkey
- Province: Afyonkarahisar
- District: Emirdağ
- Population (2021): 445
- Time zone: UTC+3 (TRT)

Güneysaray is a village in the Emirdağ District, Afyonkarahisar Province, Turkey. Its population is 445 (2021).
