= Yenikapı, Emirdağ =

Yenikapı
- Village
- Location within Turkey Location within Turkey Aegean
- Coordinates: 39.0707°N 31.3236°E
- Country: Turkey
- Province: Afyonkarahisar
- District: Emirdağ
- Population (2021): 459
- Time zone: UTC+3 (TRT)

Yenikapı is a village in the Emirdağ District, Afyonkarahisar Province, Turkey. Its population is 459 (2021).
