= Eşrefli, Emirdağ =

Eşrefli
- Village
- Location within Turkey Location within Turkey Aegean
- Coordinates: 39.0167°N 31.4878°E
- Country: Turkey
- Province: Afyonkarahisar
- District: Emirdağ
- Population (2021): 310
- Time zone: UTC+3 (TRT)

Eşrefli is a village in the Emirdağ District, Afyonkarahisar Province, Turkey. Its population is 310 (2021).
