= Hamzahacılı, Emirdağ =

Hamzahacılı
- Village
- Location within Turkey Location within Turkey Aegean
- Coordinates: 39°03′N 31°18′E
- Country: Turkey
- Province: Afyonkarahisar
- District: Emirdağ
- Population (2021): 276
- Time zone: UTC+3 (TRT)

Hamzahacılı is a village in the Emirdağ District, Afyonkarahisar Province, Turkey. Its population is 276 (2021).
