= Gülyazı, Kızılören =

Gülyazı
- Village
- Location within Turkey Location within Turkey Aegean
- Country: Turkey
- Province: Afyonkarahisar
- District: Kızılören
- Population (2021): 268
- Time zone: UTC+3 (TRT)

Gülyazı' is a village in the Kızılören District, Afyonkarahisar Province, Turkey. Its population is 268 (2021).
