= Kızılören =

- Municipality
- Location in Turkey Kızılören (Turkey Aegean)
- Coordinates: 38°15′N 30°09′E
- Country: Turkey
- Province: Afyonkarahisar
- District: Kızılören

Government
  - Mayor: Ali Erol (MHP)
- Population (2021): 1,377
- Time zone: UTC+3 (TRT)
- Website: www.kiziloren.bel.tr

Kızılören is a rural town of Afyonkarahisar Province, Turkey, 26 km from the towns of Sandıklı and Dinar, near the road to Ankara. It is the seat of Kızılören District. Its population is 1,377 (2021), down from 6,000 in 1990.

== Economy ==
Kızılören is a poor district and many people have left in search of jobs in nearby Denizli, Antalya, Eskişehir and other industrial cities in Turkey and Europe.
