= Elhan Rasulov =

Soviet Azerbaijani footballer (born 1960)

Personal information
- Full name: Elhan Afsar Rasulov
- Date of birth: 26 March 1960 (age 66)
- Place of birth: Baku, Azerbaijani SSR, Soviet Union
- Height: 1.85 m (6 ft 1 in)
- Position: Goalkeeper

Senior career*
Years	Team	Apps	(Gls)
1978–1982	PFC Neftchi	72	(0)
1983–1988	SKA Karpaty Lviv	216	(0)
1989–1990	SKA Khabarovsk	61	(0)
1991	PFC Neftchi	32	(0)
1991–1992	Stal Sanok		
1993–1997	Karpaty Lviv	71	(0)
1993	→ Krystal Chortkiv (loan)	1	(0)
1997	→ Karpaty-2 Lviv	1	(0)
- * Club domestic league appearances and goals

Elhan Rasulov (Azerbaijani: Elhan Rasulov, born 26 March 1960) is a former Soviet and Azerbaijani footballer.
