= Evciler =

- Municipality
- Location within Turkey Location within Turkey Aegean
- Coordinates: 38°02′N 29°53′E
- Country: Turkey
- Province: Afyonkarahisar
- District: Evciler

Government
  - Mayor: Berrin Uğurlu (CHP)
- Population (2021): 3,394
- Time zone: UTC+3 (TRT)
- Climate: Csa
- Website: www.evciler.bel.tr

Evciler is a town of Afyonkarahisar Province in the Aegean region of Turkey, on a plain in the mountains behind the Aegean coast, 132 km from the city of Afyon along the road to Denizli. It is the seat of Evciler District. Its population is 3,394 (2021). The mayor is Berrin Uğurlu (CHP).

== History ==
The burial mounds of Kocahöyük and Küçükhöyük near Evciler date back to the Lydian civilization. Remains of pottery have been found at Öküzviran and Kocaviran settlements.

== Evciler today ==
Evciler is a small town providing schools and other infrastructure to the surrounding villages. The land is fairly dry and mainly used for growing wheat and other grains. Many people from Evciler have emigrated to Belgium and other European countries.
