= Muratkoru, Bayat =

Muratkoru
- Village
- Location within Turkey Location within Turkey Aegean
- Coordinates: 39°07′N 30°56′E
- Country: Turkey
- Province: Afyonkarahisar
- District: Bayat
- Population (2021): 45
- Time zone: UTC+3 (TRT)

Muratkoru is a village in the Bayat District, Afyonkarahisar Province, Turkey. Its population is 45 (2021).
