= Ağılcık, Emirdağ =

Ağılcık
- Village
- Location within Turkey Location within Turkey Aegean
- Coordinates: 39.0217°N 31.1982°E
- Country: Turkey
- Province: Afyonkarahisar
- District: Emirdağ
- Population (2021): 163
- Time zone: UTC+3 (TRT)

Ağılcık is a village in the Emirdağ District, Afyonkarahisar Province, Turkey. Its population is 163 (2021).
