= Tezköy, Emirdağ =

Tezköy
- Village
- Location within Turkey Location within Turkey Aegean
- Coordinates: 38°57′N 31°09′E
- Country: Turkey
- Province: Afyonkarahisar
- District: Emirdağ
- Population (2021): 452
- Time zone: UTC+3 (TRT)

Tezköy is a village in the Emirdağ District, Afyonkarahisar Province, Turkey. Its population is 452 (2021).
