= Dağılgan, Emirdağ =

Dağılgan
- Village
- Location within Turkey Location within Turkey Aegean
- Coordinates: 39°02′10″N 31°12′54″E
- Country: Turkey
- Province: Afyonkarahisar
- District: Emirdağ
- Population (2021): 85
- Time zone: UTC+3 (TRT)

Dağılgan is a village in the Emirdağ District, Afyonkarahisar Province, Turkey. Its population is 85 (2021).
