= Toklucak, Emirdağ =

Toklucak
- Village
- Location within Turkey Location within Turkey Aegean
- Coordinates: 39.0492°N 31.4567°E
- Country: Turkey
- Province: Afyonkarahisar
- District: Emirdağ
- Population (2021): 51
- Time zone: UTC+3 (TRT)

Toklucak is a village in the Emirdağ District, Afyonkarahisar Province, Turkey. Its population is 51 (2021).
