= Ekinova, Kızılören =

Ekinova
- Village
- Location within Turkey Location within Turkey Aegean
- Coordinates: 38°18′N 30°11′E
- Country: Turkey
- Province: Afyonkarahisar
- District: Kızılören
- Population (2021): 311
- Time zone: UTC+3 (TRT)

Ekinova' is a village in the Kızılören District, Afyonkarahisar Province, Turkey. Its population is 311 (2021).
