= Beyören, Emirdağ =

Beyören
- Village
- Location within Turkey Location within Turkey Aegean
- Coordinates: 39.2400°N 31.1171°E
- Country: Turkey
- Province: Afyonkarahisar
- District: Emirdağ
- Population (2021): 71
- Time zone: UTC+3 (TRT)

Beyören is a village in the Emirdağ District, Afyonkarahisar Province, Turkey. Its population is 71 (2021).
