= Burunarkaç, Emirdağ =

Burunarkaç
- Village
- Location within Turkey Location within Turkey Aegean
- Coordinates: 39°11′N 31°03′E
- Country: Turkey
- Province: Afyonkarahisar
- District: Emirdağ
- Population (2021): 18
- Time zone: UTC+3 (TRT)

Burunarkaç is a village in the Emirdağ District, Afyonkarahisar Province, Turkey. Its population is 18 (2021).
