= Büyüktuğluk, Emirdağ =

Büyüktuğluk
- Village
- Location within Turkey Location within Turkey Aegean
- Coordinates: 39°00′N 31°34′E
- Country: Turkey
- Province: Afyonkarahisar
- District: Emirdağ
- Population (2021): 113
- Time zone: UTC+3 (TRT)

Büyüktuğluk is a village in the Emirdağ District, Afyonkarahisar Province, Turkey. Its population is 113 (2021).
