= Suvermez, Emirdağ =

Suvermez
- Village
- Location within Turkey Location within Turkey Aegean
- Coordinates: 39.0303°N 31.2233°E
- Country: Turkey
- Province: Afyonkarahisar
- District: Emirdağ
- Population (2021): 319
- Time zone: UTC+3 (TRT)

Suvermez is a village in the Emirdağ District, Afyonkarahisar Province, Turkey. Its population is 319 (2021).
