= Türkmenakören, Emirdağ =

Türkmenakören
- Village
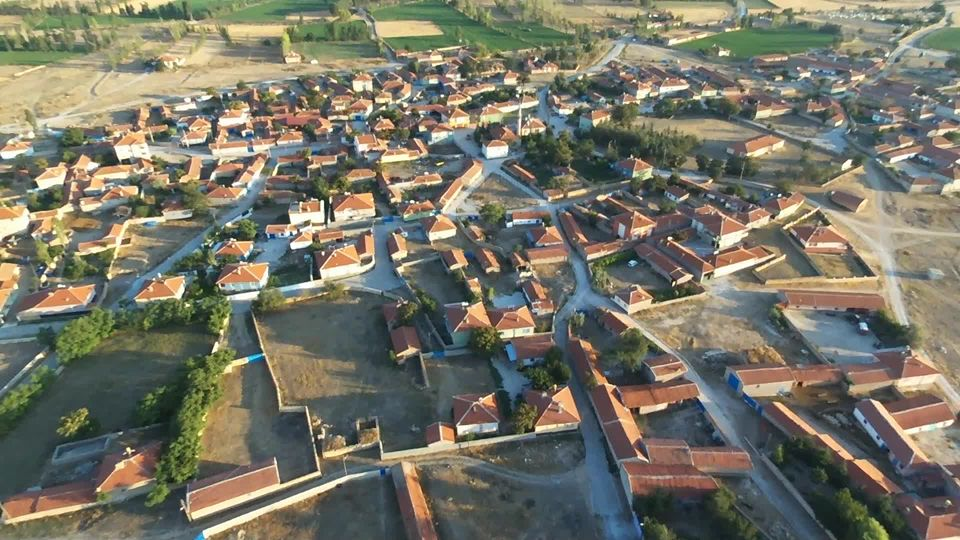

- Location within Turkey Location within Turkey Aegean
- Coordinates: 39°04′N 31°13′E
- Country: Turkey
- Province: Afyonkarahisar
- District: Emirdağ
- Population (2021): 315
- Time zone: UTC+3 (TRT)

Türkmenakören is a village in the Emirdağ District, Afyonkarahisar Province, Turkey. Its population is 315 (2021).
