= Alibeyce, Emirdağ =

Alibeyce
- Village
- Location within Turkey Location within Turkey Aegean
- Coordinates: 39°6′50″N 31°6′54″E
- Country: Turkey
- Province: Afyonkarahisar
- District: Emirdağ
- Population (2021): 124
- Time zone: UTC+3 (TRT)

Alibeyce is a village in the Emirdağ District, Afyonkarahisar Province, Turkey. Its population is 124 (2021).
