= Salihler, Emirdağ =

Salihler
- Village
- Location within Turkey Location within Turkey Aegean
- Coordinates: 39.0511°N 31.3650°E
- Country: Turkey
- Province: Afyonkarahisar
- District: Emirdağ
- Population (2021): 134
- Time zone: UTC+3 (TRT)

Salihler is a village in the Emirdağ District, Afyonkarahisar Province, Turkey. Its population is 134 (2021).
