= Emirinköyü, Emirdağ =

Emirinköyü
- Village
- Location within Turkey Location within Turkey Aegean
- Coordinates: 39°02′N 31°03′E
- Country: Turkey
- Province: Afyonkarahisar
- District: Emirdağ
- Population (2021): 126
- Time zone: UTC+3 (TRT)

Emirinköyü is a village in the Emirdağ District, Afyonkarahisar Province, Turkey. Its population is 126 (2021).
