= Sığracık, Emirdağ =

Sığracık
- Village
- Location within Turkey Location within Turkey Aegean
- Coordinates: 39°05′N 31°03′E
- Country: Turkey
- Province: Afyonkarahisar
- District: Emirdağ
- Population (2021): 201
- Time zone: UTC+3 (TRT)

Sığracık is a village in the Emirdağ District, Afyonkarahisar Province, Turkey. Its population is 201 (2021).
