= İmrallı, Bayat =

İmrallı
- Village
- Location within Turkey Location within Turkey Aegean
- Coordinates: 38.88943°N 30.90874°E
- Country: Turkey
- Province: Afyonkarahisar
- District: Bayat
- Population (2021): 711
- Time zone: UTC+3 (TRT)

İmrallı is a village in the Bayat District, Afyonkarahisar Province, Turkey. Its population is 711 (as of 2021).
