= Tepeköy, Emirdağ =

Tepeköy
- Village
- Location within Turkey Location within Turkey Aegean
- Country: Turkey
- Province: Afyonkarahisar
- District: Emirdağ
- Population (2021): 60
- Time zone: UTC+3 (TRT)

Tepeköy is a village in the Emirdağ District, Afyonkarahisar Province, Turkey. Its population is 60 (2021).
