= Aşağıpiribeyli, Emirdağ =

Aşağıpiribeyli
- Village
- Location within Turkey Location within Turkey Aegean
- Coordinates: 38°55′25″N 31°36′11″E
- Country: Turkey
- Province: Afyonkarahisar
- District: Emirdağ
- Population (2021): 805
- Time zone: UTC+3 (TRT)

Aşağıpiribeyli is a village in the Emirdağ District, Afyonkarahisar Province, Turkey. Its population is 805 (2021). Before the 2013 reorganisation, it was a town (belde).
