= Gömü, Emirdağ =

Gömü
- Municipality
- Location in Turkey Gömü (Turkey Aegean)
- Coordinates: 39°03′40″N 31°04′51″E
- Country: Turkey
- Province: Afyonkarahisar
- District: Emirdağ
- Population (2021): 2,139
- Time zone: UTC+3 (TRT)

Gömü is a town (belde) and municipality in the Emirdağ District, Afyonkarahisar Province, Turkey. Its population is 2,139 (2021). It consists of 5 quarters: Fatih, Dörtyol, Bağlarbaşi, Toki and Gökçeyaka.
