= Çaykışla, Emirdağ =

Çaykışla
- Village
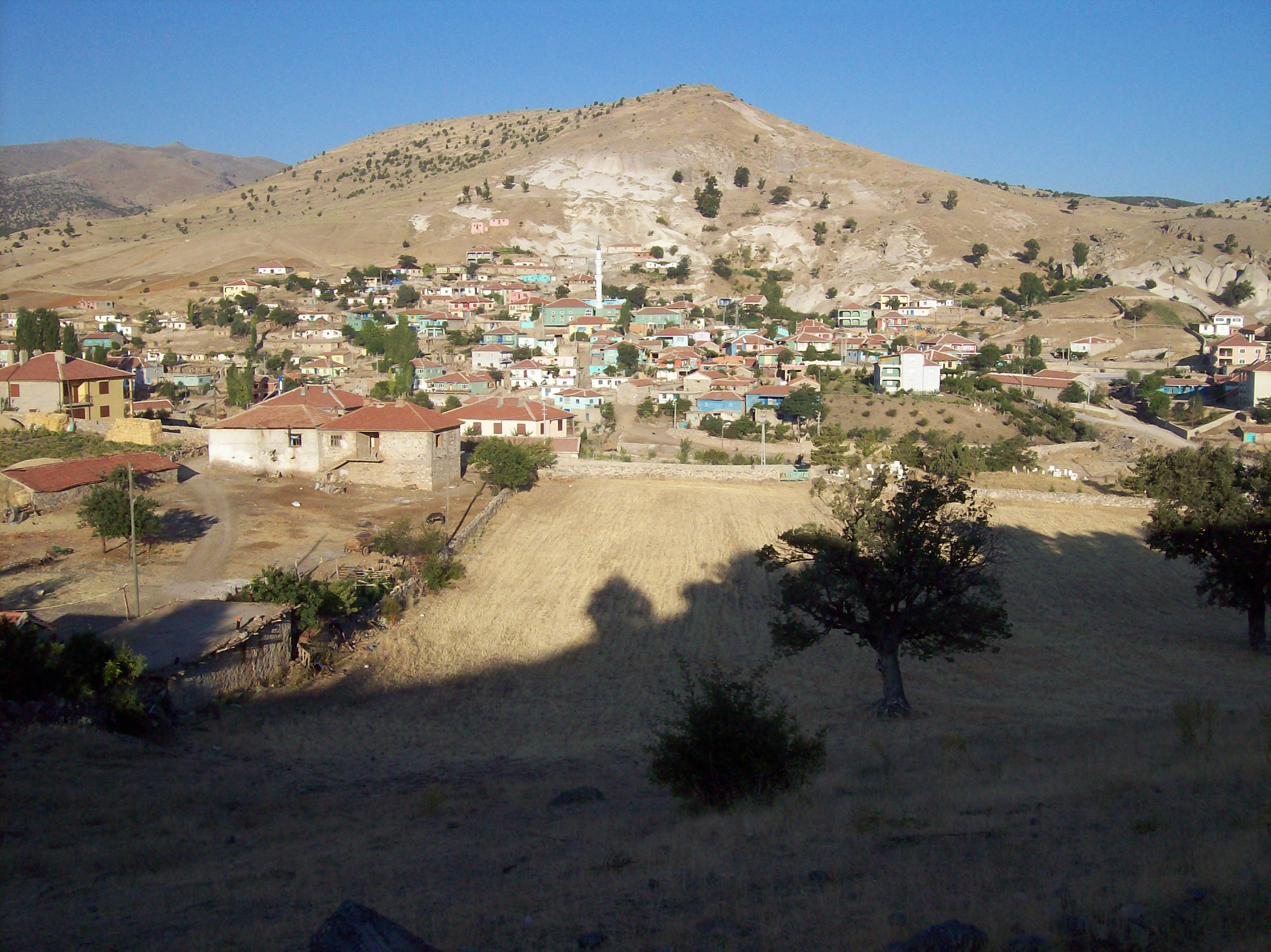

- Location within Turkey Location within Turkey Aegean
- Coordinates: 38.8953°N 31.3072°E
- Country: Turkey
- Province: Afyonkarahisar
- District: Emirdağ
- Population (2021): 679
- Time zone: UTC+3 (TRT)

Çaykışla is a village in the Emirdağ District, Afyonkarahisar Province, Turkey. Its population is 679 (2021).
