= Altınova, Evciler =

Altınova
- Village
- Location within Turkey Location within Turkey Aegean
- Coordinates: 38.0811°N 29.9283°E
- Country: Turkey
- Province: Afyonkarahisar
- District: Evciler
- Population (2021): 541
- Time zone: UTC+3 (TRT)

Altınova is a village in the Evciler District, Afyonkarahisar Province, Turkey. Its population is 541 (2021).
