= Aşağıaliçomak, Emirdağ =

Aşağıaliçomak
- Village
- Location within Turkey Location within Turkey Aegean
- Coordinates: 38°58′N 31°42′E
- Country: Turkey
- Province: Afyonkarahisar
- District: Emirdağ
- Population (2021): 148
- Time zone: UTC+3 (TRT)

Aşağıaliçomak is a village in the Emirdağ District, Afyonkarahisar Province, Turkey. Its population is 148 (2021).
