= Umraniye, Emirdağ =

Umraniye
- Village
- Location in Turkey Umraniye (Turkey Aegean)
- Coordinates: 39.1750°N 31.2344°E
- Country: Turkey
- Province: Afyonkarahisar
- District: Emirdağ
- Population (2021): 67
- Time zone: UTC+3 (TRT)

Umraniye is a village in the Emirdağ District, Afyonkarahisar Province, Turkey. Its population is 67 (2021).
