= Akpınar, Bayat =

Akpınar
- Village
- Location within Turkey Location within Turkey Aegean
- Coordinates: 38.8583°N 30.9378°E
- Country: Turkey
- Province: Afyonkarahisar
- District: Bayat
- Population (2021): 165
- Time zone: UTC+3 (TRT)

Akpınar is a village in the Bayat District, Afyonkarahisar Province, Turkey. Its population is 165 (2021).
