= Türkbelkavak, Kızılören =

Türkbelkavak
- Village
- Location within Turkey Location within Turkey Aegean
- Coordinates: 38°15′N 30°14′E
- Country: Turkey
- Province: Afyonkarahisar
- District: Kızılören
- Population (2021): 86
- Time zone: UTC+3 (TRT)

Türkbelkavak is a village in the Kızılören District, Afyonkarahisar Province, Turkey. Its population is 86 (2021).
