= Haydarlı, Dinar =

Haydarlı
- Municipality
- Location in Turkey Haydarlı (Turkey Aegean)
- Coordinates: 38.2597°N 30.3858°E
- Country: Turkey
- Province: Afyonkarahisar
- District: Dinar
- Population (2021): 2,042
- Time zone: UTC+3 (TRT)

Haydarlı is a town (belde) and municipality in the Dinar District, Afyonkarahisar Province, Turkey. Its population is 2,042 (2021). It consists of 7 quarters, including Ocaklı.
