= Eskiakören, Emirdağ =

Eskiakören
- Village
- Location within Turkey Location within Turkey Aegean
- Coordinates: 39°10′N 31°20′E
- Country: Turkey
- Province: Afyonkarahisar
- District: Emirdağ
- Population (2021): 78
- Time zone: UTC+3 (TRT)

Eskiakören is a village in the Emirdağ District, Afyonkarahisar Province, Turkey. Its population is 78 (2021).
