= Yüreğil, Emirdağ =

Yüreğil
- Village
- Location within Turkey Location within Turkey Aegean
- Coordinates: 39.0248°N 31.0267°E
- Country: Turkey
- Province: Afyonkarahisar
- District: Emirdağ
- Population (2021): 717
- Time zone: UTC+3 (TRT)

Yüreğil is a village in the Emirdağ District, Afyonkarahisar Province, Turkey. Its population is 717 (2021).
