= Kuzören, Bayat =

Kuzören
- Village
- Location within Turkey Location within Turkey Aegean
- Coordinates: 39°10′43″N 30°54′26″E
- Country: Turkey
- Province: Afyonkarahisar
- District: Bayat
- Population (2021): 47
- Time zone: UTC+3 (TRT)

Kuzören is a village in the Bayat District, Afyonkarahisar Province, Turkey. Its population is 47 (2021).
