= Yarıkkaya, Emirdağ =

Yarıkkaya
- Village
- Location within Turkey Location within Turkey Aegean
- Coordinates: 38.9911°N 31.5187°E
- Country: Turkey
- Province: Afyonkarahisar
- District: Emirdağ
- Population (2021): 115
- Time zone: UTC+3 (TRT)

Yarıkkaya is a village in the Emirdağ District, Afyonkarahisar Province, Turkey. Its population is 115 (2021).
