= Derbent, Bayat =

Derbent
- Village
- Location within Turkey Location within Turkey Aegean
- Coordinates: 38.9394°N 30.9925°E
- Country: Turkey
- Province: Afyonkarahisar
- District: Bayat
- Population (2021): 1,093
- Time zone: UTC+3 (TRT)

Derbent is a village in the Bayat District, Afyonkarahisar Province, Turkey. Its population is 1,093 (2021).
