= Güney, Bolvadin =

Güney
- Village
- Location within Turkey Location within Turkey Aegean
- Country: Turkey
- Province: Afyonkarahisar
- District: Bolvadin
- Population (2021): 194
- Time zone: UTC+3 (TRT)

Güney is a village in the Bolvadin District, Afyonkarahisar Province, Turkey. Its population is 194 (2021).
