= Aşağıkurudere, Emirdağ =

Aşağıkurudere
- Village
- Location within Turkey Location within Turkey Aegean
- Coordinates: 38°56′N 31°05′E
- Country: Turkey
- Province: Afyonkarahisar
- District: Emirdağ
- Population (2021): 191
- Time zone: UTC+3 (TRT)

Aşağıkurudere is a village in the Emirdağ District, Afyonkarahisar Province, Turkey. Its population is 191 (2021).
