= Kırkpınar, Emirdağ =

Kırkpınar
- Village
- Location within Turkey Location within Turkey Aegean
- Coordinates: 39°11′54″N 31°07′39″E
- Country: Turkey
- Province: Afyonkarahisar
- District: Emirdağ
- Population (2021): 107
- Time zone: UTC+3 (TRT)

Kırkpınar is a village in the Emirdağ District, Afyonkarahisar Province, Turkey. Its population is 107 (2021).
