= Veysel, Emirdağ =

Veysel
- Village
- Location within Turkey Location within Turkey Aegean
- Coordinates: 39.1047°N 31.3919°E
- Country: Turkey
- Province: Afyonkarahisar
- District: Emirdağ
- Population (2021): 208
- Time zone: UTC+3 (TRT)

Veysel is a village in the Emirdağ District, Afyonkarahisar Province, Turkey. Its population is 208 (2021).
