= Gözeli, Emirdağ =

Gözeli
- Village
- Location within Turkey Location within Turkey Aegean
- Coordinates: 39.1788°N 31.1403°E
- Country: Turkey
- Province: Afyonkarahisar
- District: Emirdağ
- Population (2021): 184
- Time zone: UTC+3 (TRT)

Gözeli is a village in the Emirdağ District, Afyonkarahisar Province, Turkey. Its population is 184 (2021).
