= Güney, Sinanpaşa =

Güney
- Municipality
- Location in Turkey Güney (Turkey Aegean)
- Coordinates: 38°48′N 30°5′E
- Country: Turkey
- Province: Afyonkarahisar
- District: Sinanpaşa
- Population (2021): 2,383
- Time zone: UTC+3 (TRT)

Güney is a town (belde) and municipality in the Sinanpaşa District, Afyonkarahisar Province, Turkey. Its population is 2,383 (2021). It consists of 5 quarters: Çalışlar, Yeni, Orta, Aşağı and Yukarı.
