= Bayat, Afyonkarahisar =

Bayat
- Municipality
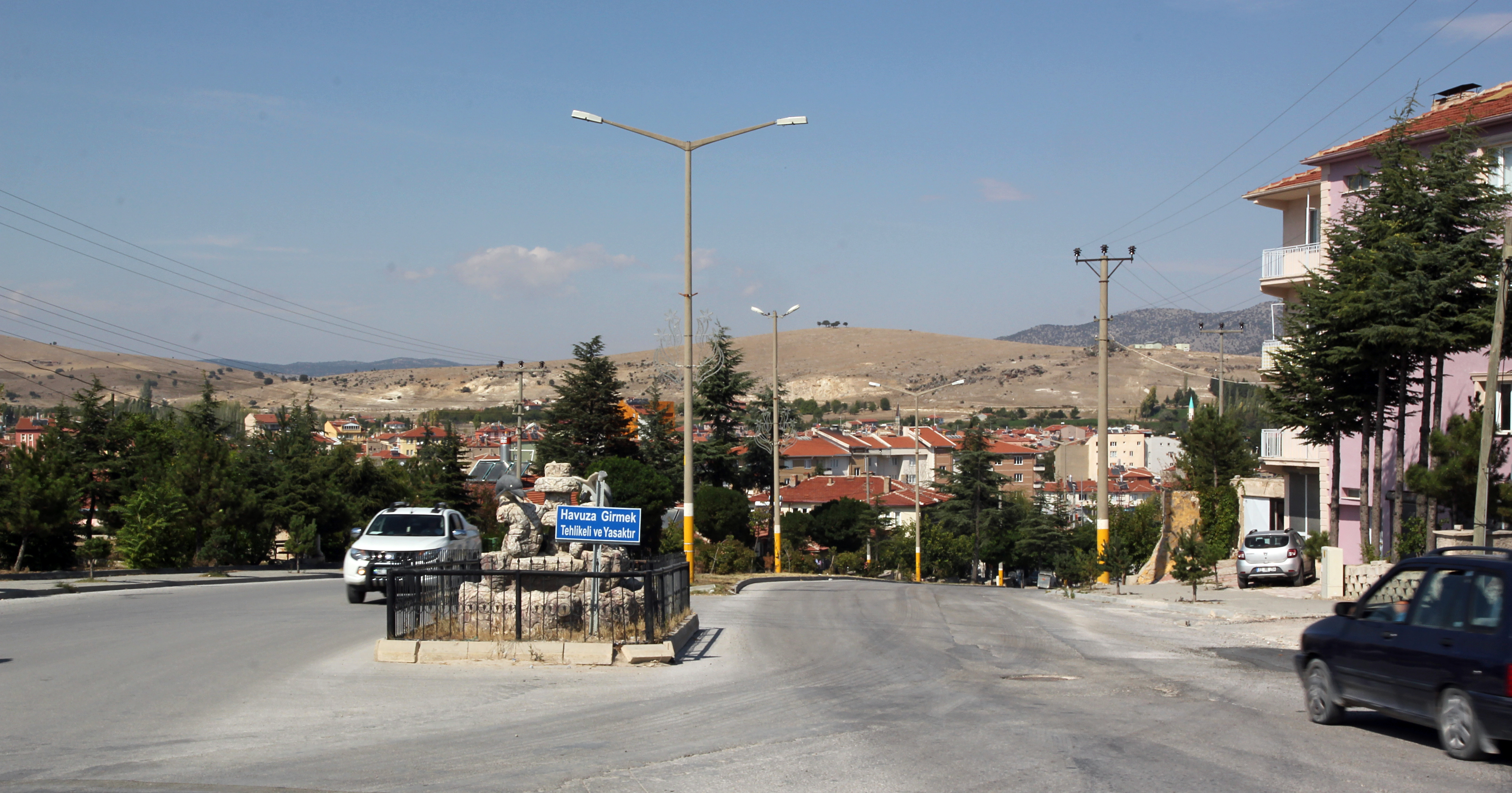

- Location within Turkey Location within Turkey Aegean
- Coordinates: 38°59′N 30°55′E
- Country: Turkey
- Province: Afyonkarahisar
- District: Bayat

Government
  - Mayor: Halil İbrahim Bodur (AKP)
- Population (2021): 4,182
- Time zone: UTC+3 (TRT)
- Climate: Csb
- Website: www.bayat.bel.tr

Bayat is a town of Afyonkarahisar Province in the Aegean region of Turkey. It is the seat of Bayat District. Its population is 4,182 (2021). The mayor is Halil İbrahim Bodur (AKP). Bayat was known in Byzantine times as Kedrea.
