= Baraklı, Evciler =

Baraklı
- Village
- Location within Turkey Location within Turkey Aegean
- Coordinates: 38.0903°N 29.9690°E
- Country: Turkey
- Province: Afyonkarahisar
- District: Evciler
- Population (2021): 483
- Time zone: UTC+3 (TRT)

Baraklı is a village in the Evciler District, Afyonkarahisar Province, Turkey. Its population is 483 (2021).
