= Elhan, Emirdağ =

Elhan
- Village
- Location within Turkey Location within Turkey Aegean
- Coordinates: 39°02′N 31°11′E
- Country: Turkey
- Province: Afyonkarahisar
- District: Emirdağ
- Population (2021): 305
- Time zone: UTC+3 (TRT)

Elhan is a village in the Emirdağ District, Afyonkarahisar Province, Turkey. Its population is 305 (2021).
