= Muratlı, Dinar =

Muratlı
- Settlement
- Location in Turkey
- Coordinates: 38.1737°N 30.1164°E
- Country: Turkey
- Province: Afyonkarahisar
- District: Dinar
- Elevation: 1,458 m (4,783 ft)
- Time zone: UTC+3 (TRT)

Muratlı is a settlement in the Dinar District, Afyonkarahisar Province, Turkey. At 1,458 metres (4,783 ft) it is the highest settlement in the district.
