= Çukurkuyu, Bayat =

Çukurkuyu
- Village
- Location within Turkey Location within Turkey Aegean
- Coordinates: 39.0682°N 30.8885°E
- Country: Turkey
- Province: Afyonkarahisar
- District: Bayat
- Population (2021): 212
- Time zone: UTC+3 (TRT)

Çukurkuyu is a village in the Bayat District, Afyonkarahisar Province, Turkey. Its population is 212 (2021).
