= Emirdağ District =

- District
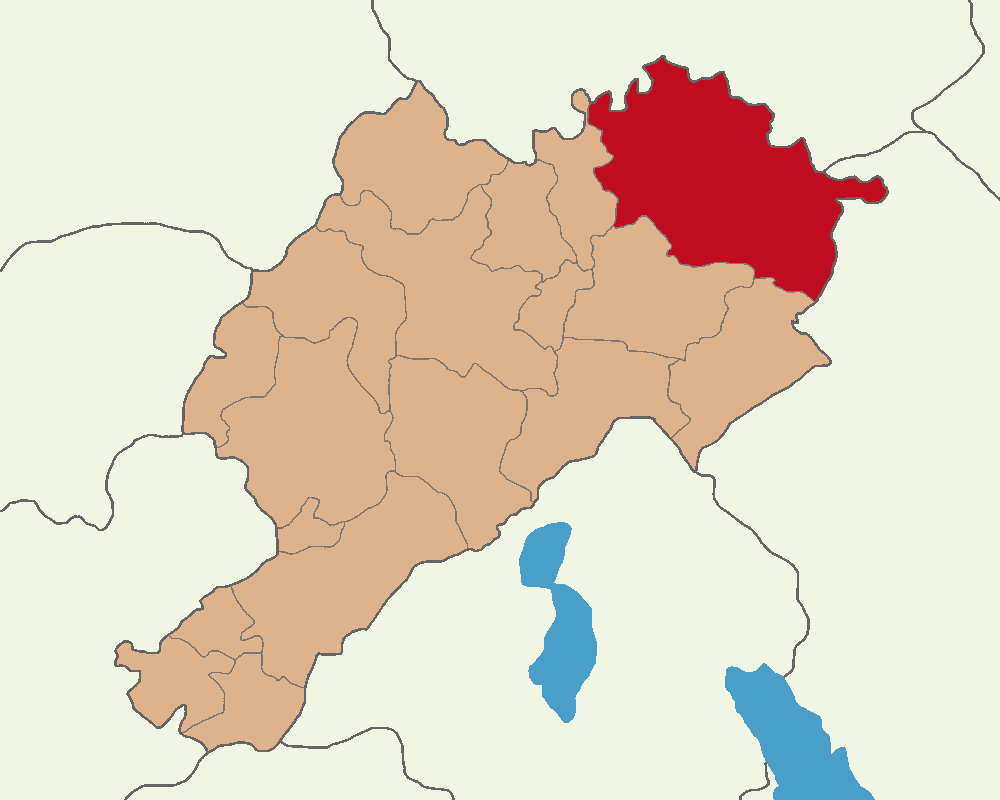
- Map showing Emirdağ District in Afyonkarahisar Province

- Location in Turkey Emirdağ District (Turkey Aegean)
- Coordinates: 39°01′N 31°09′E
- Country: Turkey
- Province: Afyonkarahisar
- Seat: Emirdağ

Government
  - Kaymakam: Halil İbrahim Acır
- Area: 2,103 km^{2} (812 sq mi)
- Population (2021): 42,327
  - Density: 20.13/km^{2} (52.13/sq mi)
- Time zone: UTC+3 (TRT)
- Website: www.emirdag.gov.tr

Emirdağ District is a district of Afyonkarahisar Province of Turkey. Its seat is the town Emirdağ. Its area is 2,103 km^{2}, and its population is 42,327 (2021).

== Composition ==
There are three municipalities in Emirdağ District:

- Davulga
- Emirdağ
- Gömü

There are 69 villages in Emirdağ District:

- Ablak
- Adayazı
- Ağılcık
- Alibeyce
- Aşağıaliçomak
- Aşağıkurudere
- Aşağıpiribeyli
- Avdan
- Aydınyaka
- Bademli
- Bağlıca
- Balcam
- Başkonak
- Beyköy
- Beyören
- Burunarkaç
- Büyüktuğluk
- Camili
- Çatallı
- Çaykışla
- Çiftlikköy
- Dağılgan
- Dağınık
- Daydalı
- Demircili
- Dereköy
- Ekizce
- Elhan
- Emirinköyü
- Eskiakören
- Eşrefli
- Gedikevi
- Gelincik
- Gözeli
- Güneyköy
- Güneysaray
- Güveççi
- Hamzahacılı
- Karaağaç
- Karacalar
- Karayatak
- Kılıçlar
- Kılıçlı Kavlaklı
- Kırkpınar
- Kuruca
- Leylekli
- Örenköy
- Özkan
- Salihler
- Sığracık
- Soğukkuyu
- Suvermez
- Tabaklar
- Tepeköy
- Tezköy
- Toklucak
- Topdere
- Türkmen
- Türkmenakören
- Umraniye
- Veysel
- Yarıkkaya
- Yarımca
- Yavuz
- Yenikapı
- Yeniköy
- Yukarıkurudere
- Yüreğil
- Yusufağa
