= Emirdağ =

- Municipality
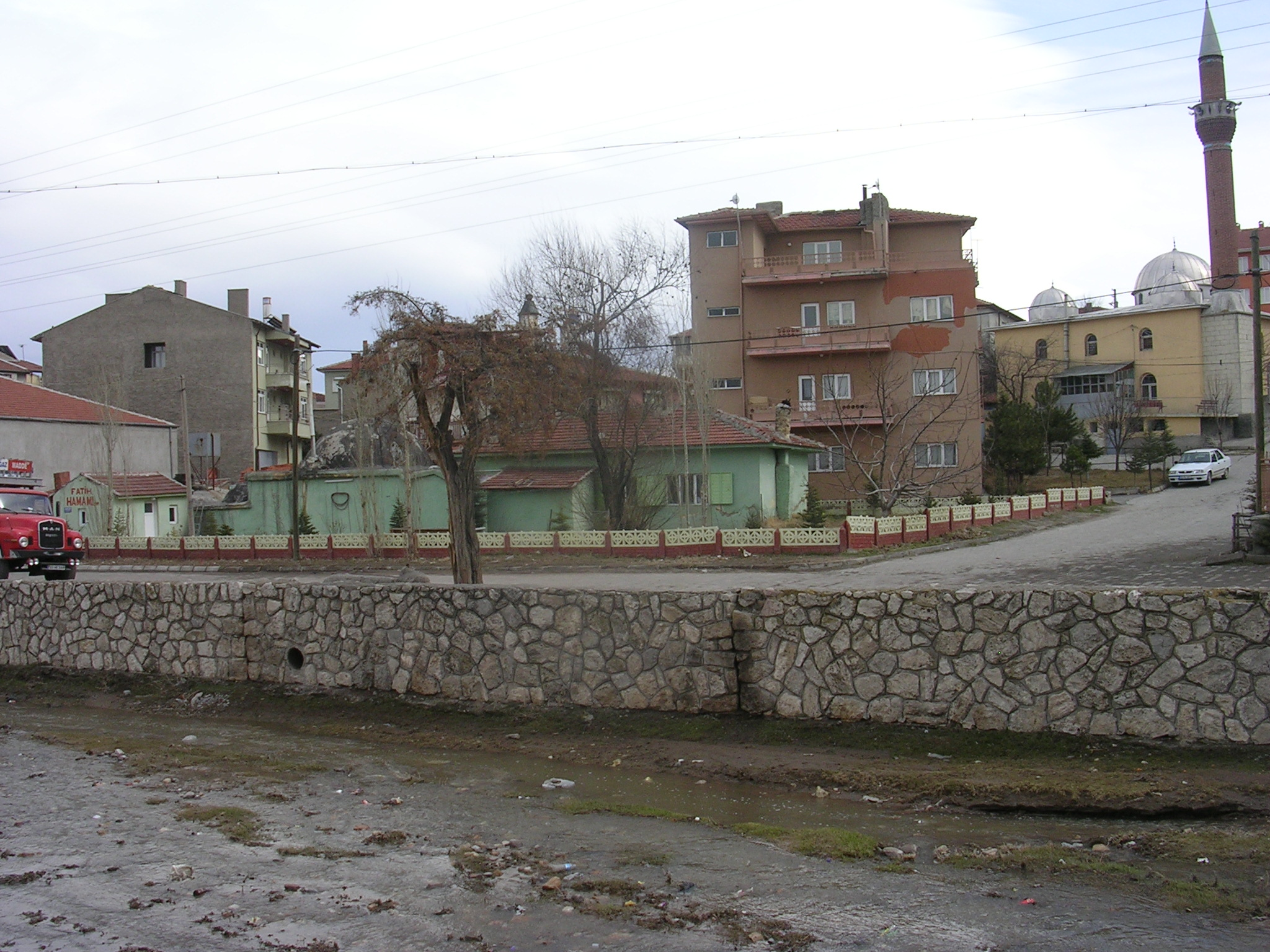
- Emirdağ Hamam (bathhouse)

- Location within Turkey Location within Turkey Aegean
- Coordinates: 39°01′N 31°09′E
- Country: Turkey
- Province: Afyonkarahisar
- District: Emirdağ

Government
  - Mayor: Serkan Koyuncu (AKP)
- Elevation: 1,100 m (3,600 ft)
- Population (2024): 43,484
- Time zone: UTC+3 (TRT)
- Postal code: 03600
- Area code: 0272
- Climate: BSk
- Website: emirdag.bel.tr

Emirdağ is a town of Afyonkarahisar Province in Turkey, between the cities of Afyon and Eskişehir. It is the seat of Emirdağ District.Emirdağ district has a total population of 43,484 according to the 2024 census. The mayor is Serkan Koyuncu (AKP).

The Emir Mountains rise steeply behind the town. The region is vulnerable to earthquakes. The weather is very cold in winter.

== Etymology ==
During the Hellenistic era the name of Emirdağ was Amorion (Greek: Ἀμόριον, romanized: Amórion). After the Arab conquests of Anatolia the city was known as Ammūriye by Arab-Islamic sources. The Ottomans called the settlement Hergen Kale, which refers to its old city. After 17th century, the city was named as Muslucalı (Which means "from Mosul") due to migrations of Turkmens from Mosul Vilayet and Rakka Eyalet. From 1867 until 1932, the town was called Azîziyye in honour of Sultan Abdulaziz. In 1932 the name Emirdağ was given by Mustafa Kemal Atatürk which derives from the Seljuk commander Emir Ahmed Mengücek, who defeated the Byzantine Empire at the Battle of Bolybotum, and rested on the mountain range near the area. Therefore the mountains were called Emir (Amir) and dağları (mountains).

== History ==
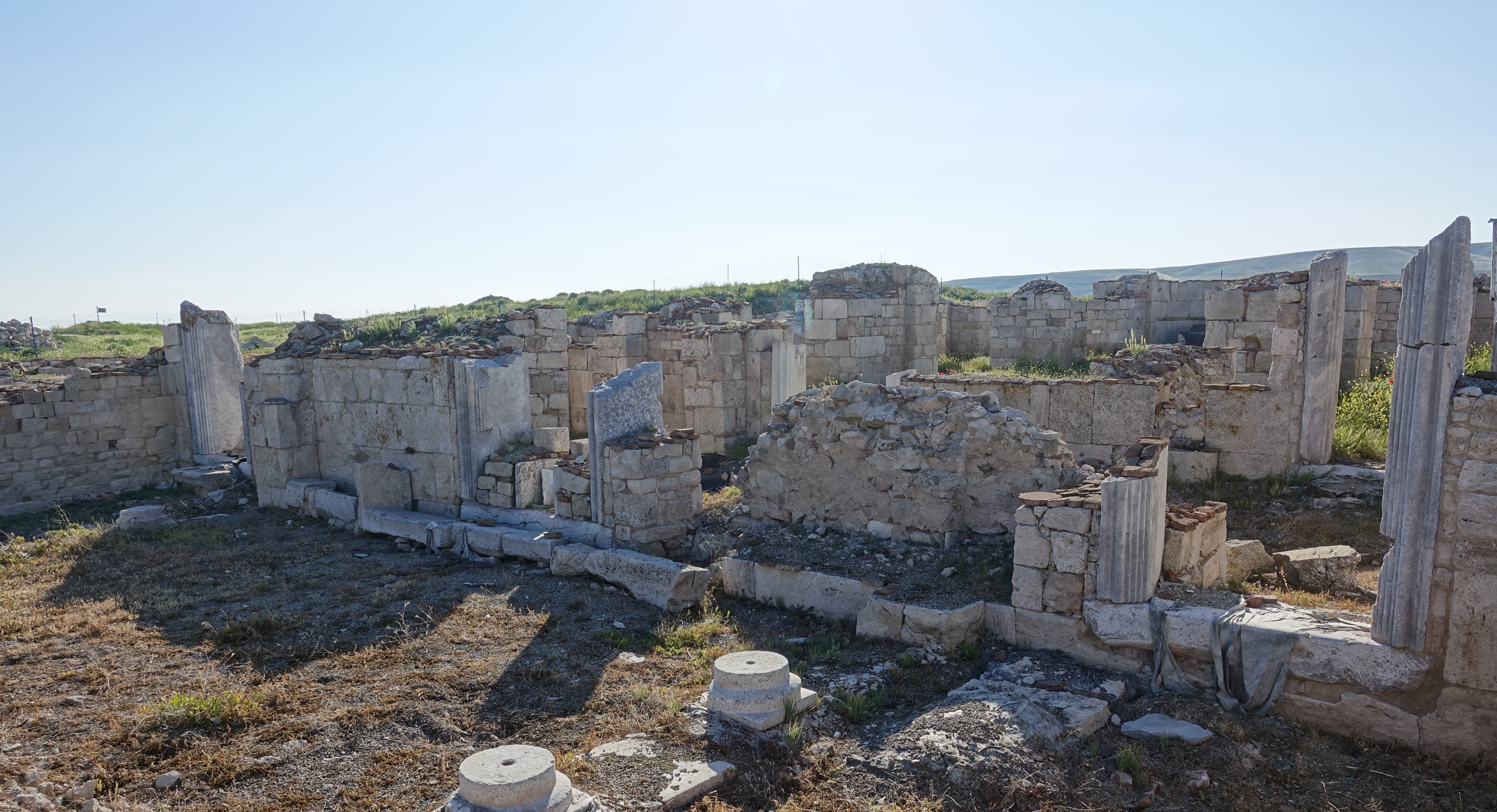
Ruins of Amorium

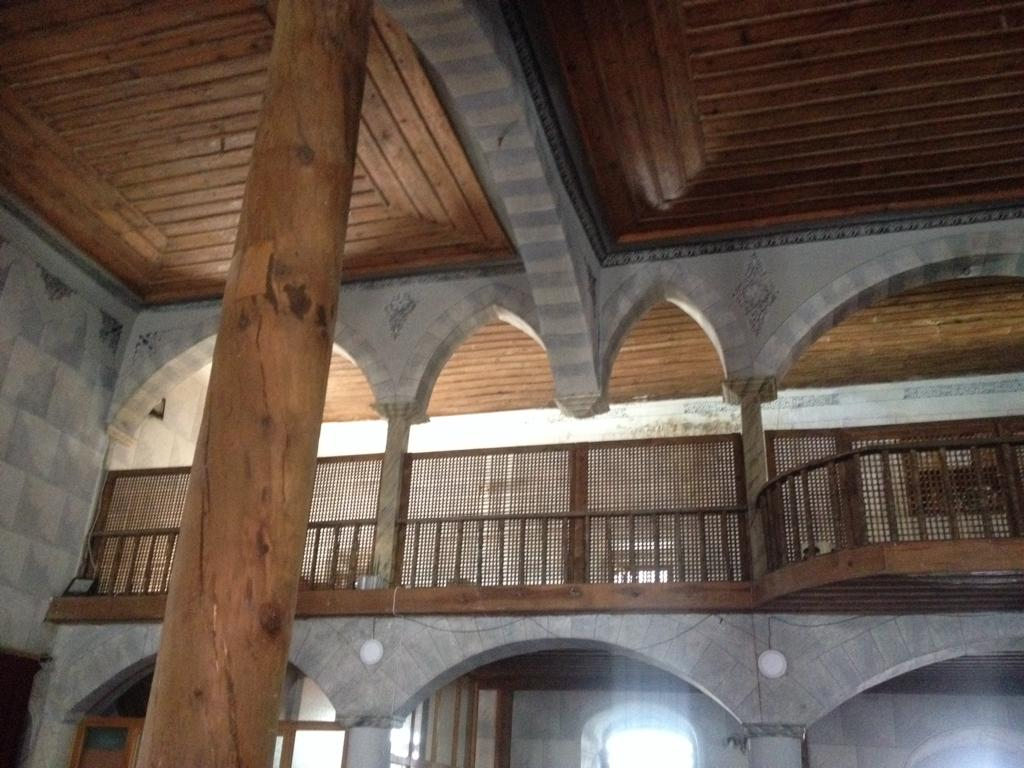
Interior of the wooden and marble Emirdağ Çarşı Camii ("Emirdağ Bazaar Mosque")

The area has been occupied since at least 1437 BC by a succession of peoples beginning with Hittites, Lydians, Persians, and Greeks.

The ruins of the Hellenistic and Byzantine city of Amorium lie about 12 km east of Emirdağ. Amorium was one of the four principal Byzantine cities in Anatolia, and was the home of the Byzantine Amorian dynasty. It was conquered in 838-845 by the Abbasid Caliph Al-Mu'tasim.

The area was settled by Turkmen from 1068 onwards and particularly following the battle of nearby Bolvadin, between the Byzantines and the Seljuk Turks. Later further waves of Turkmen followed including the Dulkadirids; Yörük nomads were settled here by the Ottoman Empire.

From 1867 until 1922, Emirdağ (Azîziyye) was part of the Hüdavendigâr vilayet of the Ottoman Empire. During the Greco-Turkish War, Emirdağ was occupied by Greek forces from 16 August 1921 till 22 September 1921.

== Emirdağ today ==
Many Turkish migrants in Belgium and the Netherlands originally came from Emirdağ and the surrounding villages, including Karacalar where there is a strong Alevi minority. People originally went abroad to work as miners in the 1950s and nowadays are typically occupied with running restaurants, cafes, and bars.

This emigration helps to explain why the population growth in Emirdağ in recent decades has been less than most Anatolian towns (the population of the town in 1960 was 10,069). It also means that in summer the district is swollen with local families returning on vacation.

Many of these families have invested their savings in apartment buildings, offices and shops in Emirdağ. This is still a typical Turkish country town and quite conservative; the tea-gardens are segregated into areas for families and single men. There are some basic restaurants and internet cafes. There is a jandarma training camp in Emirdağ and the army is significant for the economy of the town in winter.

The local cuisine includes arabaşı, a soup with dumplings.

== Climate ==
Emirdağ has a borderline humid subtropical and humid continental climate (Köppen: Cfa/Dfa), with hot, dry summers, and cold, somewhat snowy winters.

Climate data for Emirdağ (1991–2020)
Month	Jan	Feb	Mar	Apr	May	Jun	Jul	Aug	Sep	Oct	Nov	Dec	Year
Mean daily maximum °C (°F)	4.6 (40.3)	7.2 (45.0)	12.3 (54.1)	17.5 (63.5)	22.7 (72.9)	27.2 (81.0)	31.2 (88.2)	31.1 (88.0)	26.7 (80.1)	20.3 (68.5)	12.9 (55.2)	6.5 (43.7)	18.4 (65.1)
Daily mean °C (°F)	0.1 (32.2)	2.0 (35.6)	6.2 (43.2)	10.9 (51.6)	15.7 (60.3)	19.8 (67.6)	23.1 (73.6)	22.9 (73.2)	18.6 (65.5)	13.3 (55.9)	6.8 (44.2)	2.0 (35.6)	11.8 (53.2)
Mean daily minimum °C (°F)	−3.6 (25.5)	−2.2 (28.0)	1.1 (34.0)	5.1 (41.2)	9.3 (48.7)	12.6 (54.7)	15.1 (59.2)	15.1 (59.2)	11.3 (52.3)	7.3 (45.1)	1.9 (35.4)	−1.6 (29.1)	6.0 (42.8)
Average precipitation mm (inches)	40.95 (1.61)	36.72 (1.45)	39.06 (1.54)	42.16 (1.66)	51.53 (2.03)	42.49 (1.67)	16.81 (0.66)	19.03 (0.75)	20.45 (0.81)	34.37 (1.35)	31.21 (1.23)	43.79 (1.72)	418.57 (16.48)
Average precipitation days (≥ 1.0 mm)	6.8	6.3	6.6	7.0	7.6	5.8	2.4	3.1	3.3	5.1	4.9	6.9	65.8
Average relative humidity (%)	77.8	71.3	62.8	58.9	57.4	54.1	47.5	48.7	51.1	61.6	70.3	77.9	61.6
Source: NOAA

== Politics ==
Ugur Serdar Kargın (MHP) is elected as new mayor in 2014. The council had an alderman for external affairs in 2004–2009, Metin Edeer (MHP), who has been living in Schaerbeek (Brussels) since 1978, where he runs two restaurants and presided over an association of people from Emirdağ (EYAD); he visits Emirdağ during the summer holidays.

Previous mayors:

- Lütfi Ihsan Dag, AK Party (2004-2009)
- Ismet Güler, CHP (1994-2004)
- Ali Kocaman, DYP (1989-1994)
- Ömer Faruk Pala, SHP (1985-1989)
- Erol Sarıer, ANAP (1984-1985)
- Hacı Ali Kılıçalp, AP (1968-1982)

== Population ==
The population of the municipality of Emirdağ is shown below:

Historical population
Year	Pop.	±% p.a.
2007	21,898	—
2012	19,069	−2.73%
2017	18,526	−0.58%
2022	22,978	+4.40%
Source: TÜIK (2007-2022)

== Emirdağ Folk Songs ==
Emirdağ Folk Songs are very famous.

Some Emirdağ Folk Songs:

- Al Fadimem
- Emirdağ'ı Birbirine Ulalı
- Harmana Sererler
- Su vermez Diyorlar
- Zalım Poyraz
- Dabandan
- Düz Oyun
- Pancar Ektim Emirdağ'ın Düzüne
- Ağıl Ören
- Yoğurt Çaldım Kazana
- Yalan mıydı Yaşar
- Ekizce Üstünde Bir Karabulut
- Emirdağ'ın Güzelleri
- Kuşburnu Pürlenir mi
- Ta Yaylanın Yükseğinde Evleri
- Erzurum'dan Çevirdiler Yolumu
- Eylülde Gel
- Emirdağı'na Vardım Sabaha Karşı

== Notable natives ==
Emirdağ has a longstanding folk-music tradition and has been associated with numerous folk songs (türkü) and singers including during the 20th century.

- Kubat - popular singer specialising in a hybrid of Turkish folk music with electronic instruments. He was brought up in Belgium of an Emirdağ family.
- Azra Akın - Miss World 2002, brought up in the Netherlands of an Emirdağ family.
- Tevfik Başer - film director
- Bülent Akın - Footballer who has played for Turkish giants Galatasaray and English club Bolton Wanderers
- Fuat Çapa - Belgian-Turkish football manager.
- Cemal Çavdarlı - Former Belgian member of Parliament
