= List of municipalities in Afyonkarahisar Province =

This is the List of municipalities in Afyonkarahisar Province, Turkey as of January 2023.

District	Municipality
Afyonkarahisar	Afyonkarahisar
Afyonkarahisar	Beyyazı
Afyonkarahisar	Çayırbağ
Afyonkarahisar	Çıkrık
Afyonkarahisar	Değirmenayvalı
Afyonkarahisar	Erkmen
Afyonkarahisar	Fethibey
Afyonkarahisar	Gebeceler
Afyonkarahisar	Işıklar
Afyonkarahisar	Kocatepe
Afyonkarahisar	Nuribey
Afyonkarahisar	Salar
Afyonkarahisar	Susuz
Afyonkarahisar	Sülümenli
Afyonkarahisar	Sülün
Başmakçı	Başmakçı
Bayat	Bayat
Bolvadin	Bolvadin
Bolvadin	Dişli
Bolvadin	Özburun
Çay	Çay
Çay	Karamıkkaracaören
Çay	Pazarağaç
Çobanlar	Çobanlar
Çobanlar	Kocaöz
Dazkırı	Dazkırı
Dinar	Dinar
Dinar	Haydarlı
Dinar	Tatarlı
Emirdağ	Davulga
Emirdağ	Emirdağ
Emirdağ	Gömü
Evciler	Evciler
Hocalar	Hocalar
İhsaniye	Döğer
İhsaniye	Gazlıgöl
İhsaniye	İhsaniye
İhsaniye	Kayıhan
İhsaniye	Yaylabağı
İscehisar	İscehisar
İscehisar	Seydiler
Kızılören	Kızılören
Sandıklı	Akharım
Sandıklı	Sandıklı
Sinanpaşa	Ahmetpaşa
Sinanpaşa	Akören
Sinanpaşa	Düzağaç
Sinanpaşa	Güney
Sinanpaşa	Kılıçarslan
Sinanpaşa	Kırka
Sinanpaşa	Küçükhüyük
Sinanpaşa	Serban
Sinanpaşa	Sinanpaşa
Sinanpaşa	Taşoluk
Sinanpaşa	Tınaztepe
Sultandağı	Dereçine
Sultandağı	Sultandağı
Sultandağı	Yeşilçiftlik
Şuhut	Karaadilli
Şuhut	Şuhut
