= Erenler, Afyonkarahisar =

Erenler Kumartaş
- Neighbourhood
- Location within Turkey Location within Turkey Aegean
- Coordinates: 38°49′11″N 30°32′26″E
- Country: Turkey
- Province: Afyonkarahisar
- District: Afyonkarahisar
- Municipality: Afyonkarahisar
- Population (2021): 9,973
- Time zone: UTC+3 (TRT)

Erenler (formerly: Kumartaş) is a neighbourhood of the city Afyonkarahisar, Turkey. Its population is 9,973 (2021).

Nearby towns include Çayırbağ (1.9 nm), Beyyazı (2.4 nm), Afyonkarahisar (3.8 nm) and Susuz (3.4 nm).

In the early age of history, Cuman Turks (Kuman Turkleri) have immigrated to this land, and set up a village. Initial name of the village was originated from the people's descent. Recently, it is renamed as Erenler by the decision of village headman and the committee consisting of elderly wise people. Population was about 2000 at the end of 2008.
