= Sülümenli =

- Municipality
- Location in Turkey Sülümenli (Turkey Aegean)
- Coordinates: 38°43′10″N 30°43′42″E
- Country: Turkey
- Province: Afyonkarahisar
- District: Afyonkarahisar
- Population (2021): 3,877
- Time zone: UTC+3 (TRT)

Sülümenli is a town (belde) and municipality in the Afyonkarahisar District, Afyonkarahisar Province, Turkey. Its population is 3,877 (2021). It is located 20 km away from the city of Afyonkarahisar. It is bordered by Gebeceler to the north, Çavdarlı to the northwest, Çukurköy to the west, the village of Karaaslan to the southwest, Işıklar to the south and Çobanlar to the east. It has a surface area of 208 km². It has the largest sugar factory of Turkey in its border and irrigation channels for agricultural activities.

== History ==
According to myths, Sülümenli is founded by a group of Süleymanlı (Salmanlı) branch of Avşar Tribe of Danishment principality.

== Social life ==
The town has three primary schools, six mosques, two quran schools, and a health office.

== Administration ==
The town became municipality at 1967 and İsmail ÇAKAL is mayor second time.

Sülümenli Mayors
Years	Mayors
1967–1971	Ali Çetinkaya
1971–1973	Mehmet Aybey
1973–1973	Osman Ekşi
1974–1977	Mehmet Aybey
1977–1980	İsmet Dalkıran
1981–1984	Mehmet Aybey
1984–1989	Kazım Gökmen
1989–1994	Rüştü Özdemir
1994–1999	İsmail Çakal
1999–2009	Mustafa Tabak
2009–	İsmail Çakal

The town has 6 quarters:

Quarters of Sülümenli
Quarter	Quarter Chief
Ulucami	Halil İbrahim Çöygün
Zafer	Harun Büber
İstiklal	Basri Tekkanat
Cumhuriyet Mahallesi	Ali Çelik
Altındağ Mahallesi	Mevlüt Erdoğan
Şeker Mahallesi	Ali Sellekteroğlu

== Economy ==
Afyonkarahisar Sugar Factory and Sugar Machine Factory and many brick and tile factories are located within the borders.

== Population ==
Year	Population
2000	4782
1997	4541
1990	4755
1985	4280
1980	3960
1975	3687
1970	3100
1965	2600
1960	2000
