= Cidyessus =

City in ancient Phrygia

Coordinates: 38°44′35″N 30°11′27″E

Cidyessus or Kidyessos (Ancient Greek: Κιδύησσος) was a city of some importance, west of Ammonia in west-central ancient Phrygia, in the territory of the Setchanli Ova, or Mouse Plain; this large and fertile valley projects far into Phrygia Salutaris, but the city was in Phrygia Pacatiana.

The old native name may have been Kydessos, though it is Kidyessos on its coins. Modern scholars place its site near modern Çayhisar, Sinanpaşa district, Afyonkarahisar Province.

== Bishopric ==
Three ancient bishops of the see of Cidyessus are mentioned in extant contemporary documents: Heraclius participated in the Council of Chalcedon in 451; Andreas in the Second Council of Nicaea in 787; and Thomas in the Photian Council of Constantinople (879).

The see is mentioned in Notitiæ episcopatuum, until the 12th or 13th century, as a suffragan of Laodicea, the capital of Phrygia Pacatiana.

No longer a residential bishopric, Cidyessus is today listed by the Catholic Church as a titular see.

== See also ==
- Colonies in antiquity
- History of Turkey
- List of Catholic titular sees
