= Yakasinek, Sultandağı =

Yakasinek
- Village
- Location within Turkey Location within Turkey Aegean
- Coordinates: 38°33′N 31°10′E
- Country: Turkey
- Province: Afyonkarahisar
- District: Sultandağı
- Population (2021): 1,330
- Time zone: UTC+3 (TRT)
- Postal code: 03900
- Area code: 0272

Yakasinek is a village in the Sultandağı District, Afyonkarahisar Province, Turkey. Its population is 1,330 (2021). Before the 2013 reorganisation, it was a town (belde). It is located near Lake Eber, 6 km (3.7 mi) northwest from the town Sultandağı and 60 km (37 mi) east from Afyonkarahisar. Afyon-Pozantı connection is provided with the E981 highway passing through its borders.

== Economy ==
The main source of revenues are apricot and cherry farming. The famous Napoleon cherry is an important source of export for village. A minor part of the population also stock farming.

== History ==
There are ancient settlements of Romans and Oghuz Turks in the village. Name of the village is mentioned as Yaka Hasenek in the Seljuk and Ottoman records.

The Afyon-Akşehir railway line built by Chemins de fer Ottomans d'Anatolie on 27 November 1895 was put into service. The line was purchased by Turkish Republic in 1928.

The ancient settlements of Oghuz Turks and Romans in the region are preserved today:

Kocaoğuz Mound: 1.2. and 3rd degree Archaeological site.

Yeni Tumulus: It is the 1st degree archaeological site of the Roman Period.
