= Lake Eber =

- Eber Gölü (Turkish)
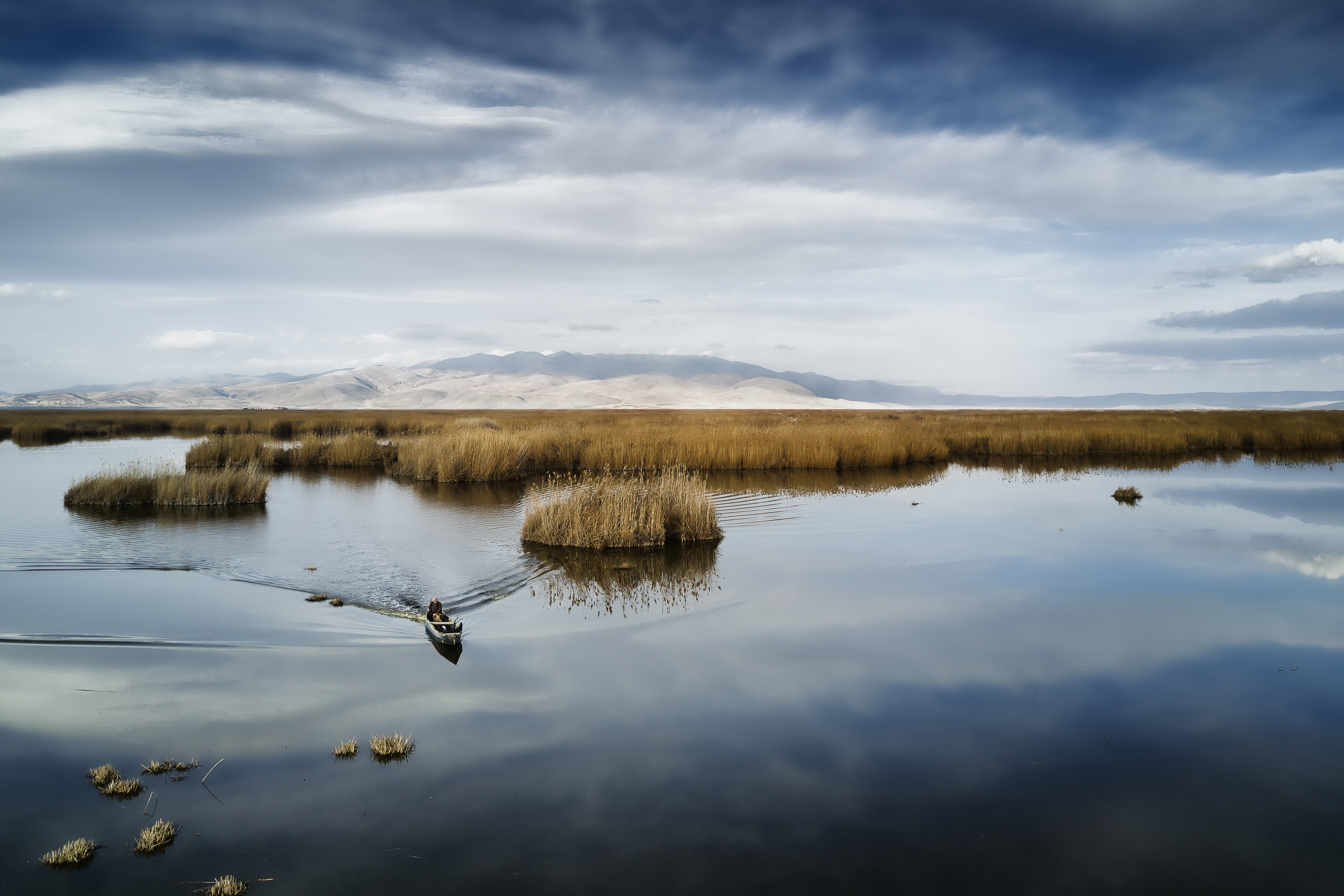

- Location within Turkey
- Location: Afyon Province, Turkey
- Coordinates: 38°38′N 31°09′E
- Type: lake
- Max. depth: 21 metres (69 ft)
- Surface elevation: 967 metres (3,173 ft)

Lake Eber (Turkish: Eber Gölü) is a freshwater lake in Afyon Province, Turkey. The lake used to be connected with nearby Lake Akşehir and was named Tessarakonta Martyron, the Forty Martyr's lake, in premodern times.

== Geography ==
The lake is between the district centers of Çay, Bolvadin and Sultandağı of Afyon Province. The midpoint is at about 38°38′N 31°09′E. The altitude of the water surface with respect to sea level is 967 metres (3,173 ft). The surface area fluctuates and at times it may be exceed 125 square kilometres (48 sq mi). In past the maximum recorded depth was 21 metres (69 ft).

== Geology ==
Lake Eber is a part of Akarçay closed basin, a tectonic basin about 7,600 square kilometres (2,900 sq mi). At the conclusion of the last glacier age (Pleistocene) a vast lake was formed in the basin. But after the water level dropped, the lake was fragmentized into two lakes. Lake Eber is at the north west and Lake Akşehir which shares the same history lies at the south east. Presently the distance between the two lakes (nearest points) is about 10 kilometres (6.2 mi).

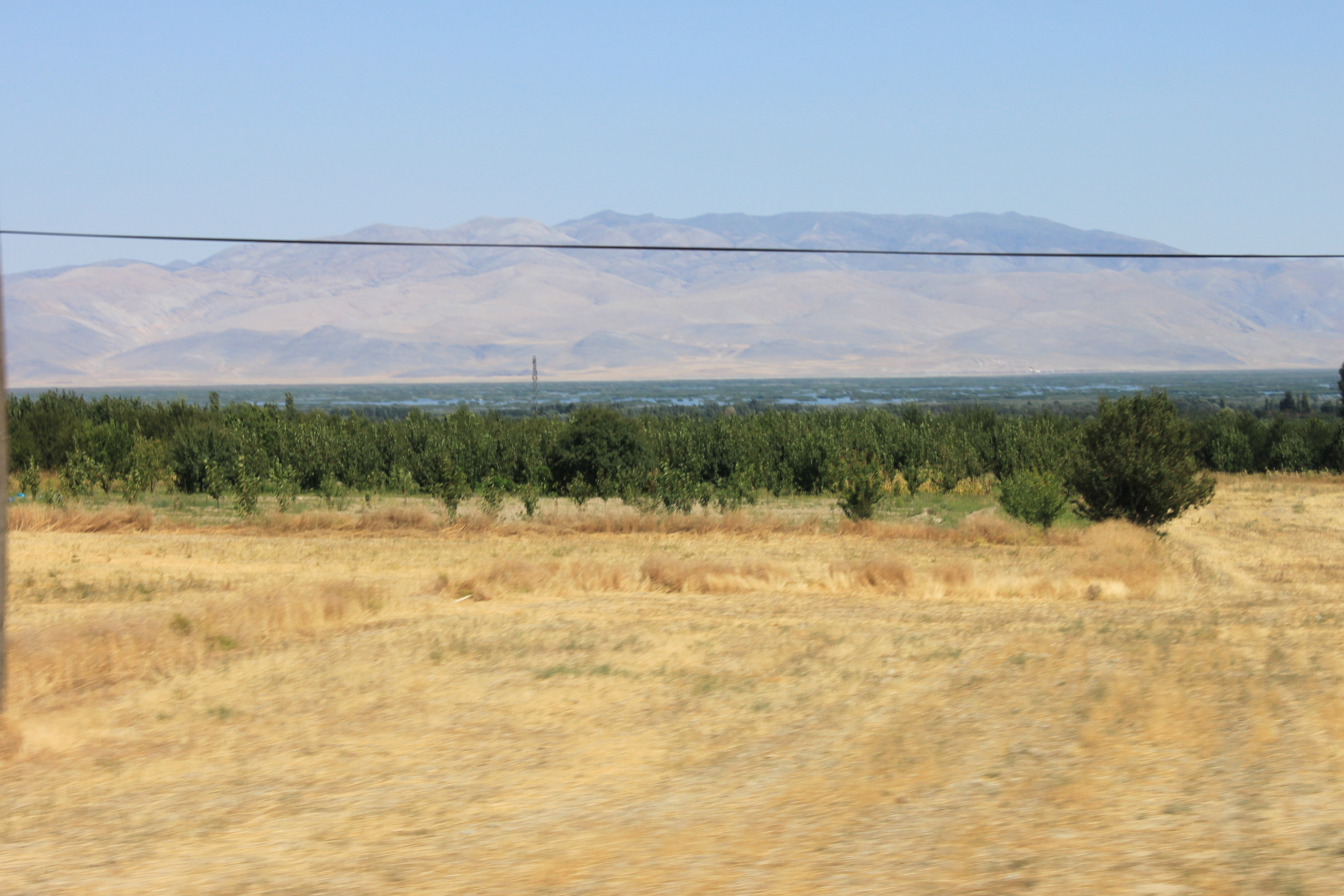
Lake Eber (Eber Gölü) near Çayırpınar, Afyonkarahisar Province; View from the south.

== Tributaries ==
The tributaries are rivulets from the Sultan Mountains at the south. When the level increases beyond a certain level the water is fed to the nearby lower level Akşehir lake by a channel (Eber channel).

== Ecology ==
The main plants of the lake are Typha latifolia, Phragmites australis, Lycopus europaeus and Mentha aquatica. The lake is known for the reed beds. Sometimes the remains of reed beds which detach from the land, constitute floating islands on the lake and may be used by the fishermen. The fish species are Cyprinus carpio, Esox lucius and Gobio gobio. The lake is also known for various waterfowls.

== Important Bird Area status ==
The lake was declared by BirdLife International as an Important Bird Area in 1989 for its waterfowl species of international character and species, which are threatened by hunting, pollution and reed cutting.

== Environmental issues ==
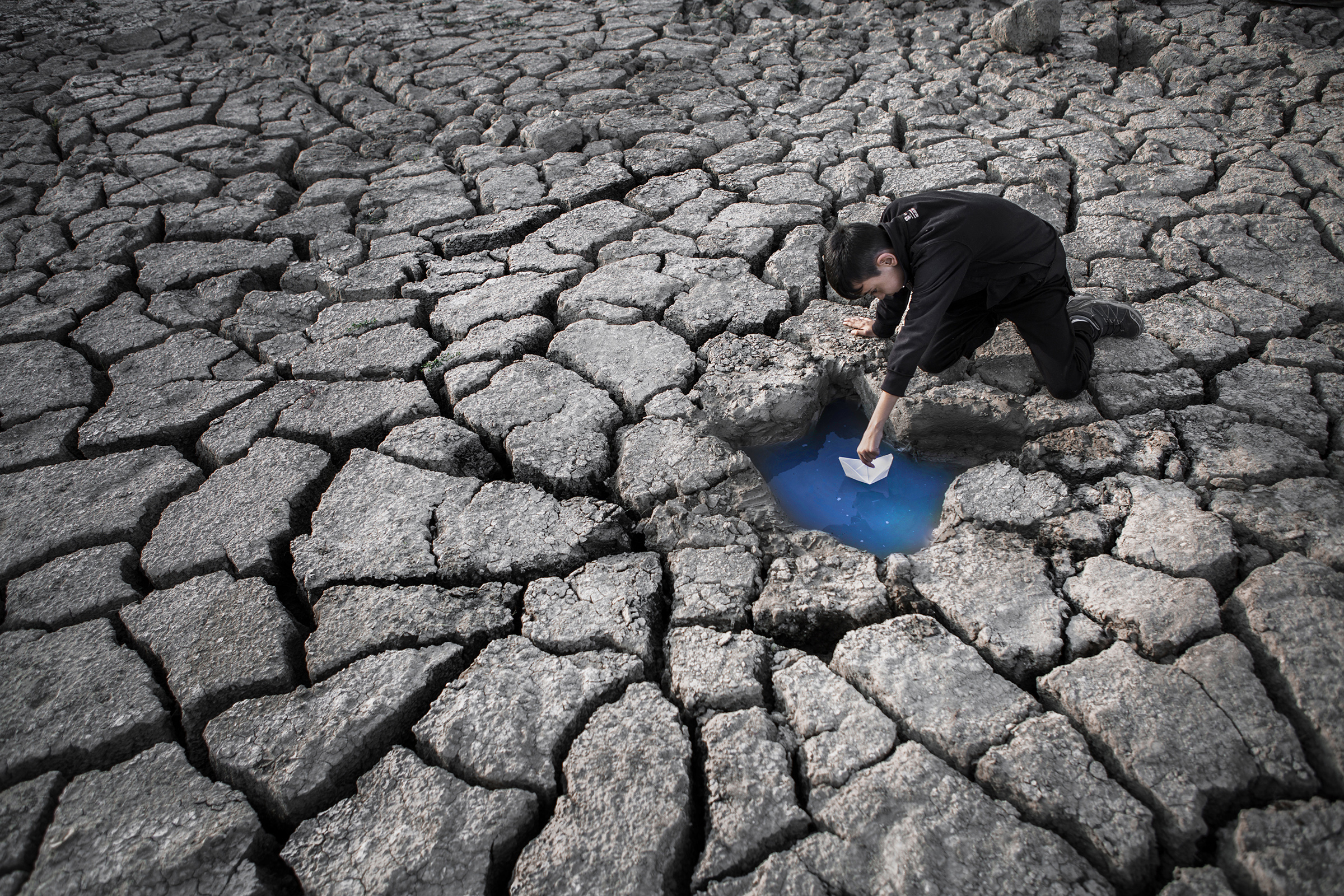

Due to climate change in Turkey and misuse of water sources, the surface area of the lake is shrinking. The neighbouring Lake Akşehir has been mostly dried up. Up to 1992, the most important problem was water pollution. Although, the lake was declared as Natural Protected Area in 1992, (Turkish: SİT) it was reported that the lake had dried out completely in 2018. As of 2020, the water has been reported to be back in the lake.
