= Erenler =

Erenler may refer to:

== Places in Turkey ==
- Erenler, Artvin, a village in Artvin Province
- Erenler, Bayramören
- Erenler, Ceyhan, a village in Adana Province
- Erenler, Devrek, a village in Zonguldak Province
- Erenler, Sakarya, a municipality and district governorate in Sakarya Province
- Erenler, Afyonkarahisar, a populated place in Afyonkarahisar Province
- Erenler, Araklı, a populated place in Trabzon Province
- Erenler, Çayeli, a populated place in Rize Province
- Erenler, Devrekani, a populated place in Kastamonu Province
- Erenler, Karaçoban
- Erenler, Kırklareli, a town along the Sultans Trail, a long-distance footpath from Vienna to Istanbul
- Erenler, Oğuzlar
- Erenler, Orhaneli, a populated place in Bursa Province
- Erenler, Pınarhisar, a populated place in Kırklareli Province
- Erenler, Şile, a populated place in Istanbul Province

== People ==
- Mehmet Erenler, a Turkish folk musician
- Yaşar Erenler, a member of the computer engineering faculty at Istanbul Technical University, Turkey
