= Akbaba, Sultandağı =

Akbaba
- Village
- Location within Turkey Location within Turkey Aegean
- Coordinates: 38°27′N 31°17′E
- Country: Turkey
- Province: Afyonkarahisar
- District: Sultandağı
- Population (2021): 146
- Time zone: UTC+3 (TRT)

Akbaba is a village in the Sultandağı District, Afyonkarahisar Province, Turkey. Its population is 146 (2021).

It has 3 main roads and sits off the D.300 State road
