= Tazlar, Sinanpaşa =

Tazlar
- Village
- Location within Turkey Location within Turkey Aegean
- Coordinates: 38°46′N 30°05′E
- Country: Turkey
- Province: Afyonkarahisar
- District: Sinanpaşa
- Population (2021): 329
- Time zone: UTC+3 (TRT)

Tazlar is a village in the Sinanpaşa District, Afyonkarahisar Province, Turkey. Its population is 329 (2021).
