= İğdeli, Sinanpaşa =

İğdeli
- Village
- Location within Turkey Location within Turkey Aegean
- Country: Turkey
- Province: Afyonkarahisar
- District: Sinanpaşa
- Population (2021): 81
- Time zone: UTC+3 (TRT)

İğdeli is a village in the Sinanpaşa District, Afyonkarahisar Province, Turkey. Its population is 81 (2021).
