= Kurucaova, Bolvadin =

Kurucaova
- Village
- Location within Turkey Location within Turkey Aegean
- Coordinates: 38.7397°N 30.9281°E
- Country: Turkey
- Province: Afyonkarahisar
- District: Bolvadin
- Population (2021): 1,032
- Time zone: UTC+3 (TRT)

Kurucaova is a village in the Bolvadin District, Afyonkarahisar Province, Turkey. Its population is 1,032 (2021).
