= Altıgöz Bridge (Afyonkarahisar) =

Bridge in Turkey

- Coordinates: 38.76969°N 30.54864°E
- Crosses: Akarçay River
- Official name: Altıgöz Köprüsü

Characteristics
- Material: Stone arches
- Total length: 44 m (144 ft)
- No. of spans: 6

History
- Construction start: ca. 1209

Location
- Interactive map of Altıgöz Bridge

The Altıgöz Bridge (in Turkish: Altıgöz Köprüsü) is a stone bridge dating from the Sultanate of Rum period.

The bridge is located in central western Anatolia, at Afyonkarahisar, close to the city's Çetinkaya railway station. Its Turkish name means "Six arch bridge". The bridge crosses the little Akarçay River.

According to the İslâm Ansiklopedisi (encyclopedia), information on the bridge comes from an inscription which employs an old Thuluth script, and which is convoluted and hard to read. The inscription identifies an emir called Ebû Vefâ İlyas b. Oğuz, who probably belonged to the Ag Qoyunlu, as responsible for having constructed the bridge before 1209, although the thirteenth-century bridge may not have been the first bridge at this point. The bridge was probably built using stone from the ancient theater at Prymnessos (the modern-day village of Sülün).

The six arch bridge is 44 m (144 ft) long. The most recent restoration was performed in 1985. By that time the inscription tablet slab (originally recycled from an ancient marble sarcophagus) had fallen off and been placed in a local museum, but in 1985 the inscription was returned to its position on the bridge.
