= Ortakarabağ, Bolvadin =

Ortakarabağ
- Village
- Location within Turkey Location within Turkey Aegean
- Coordinates: 38°41′N 31°14′E
- Country: Turkey
- Province: Afyonkarahisar
- District: Bolvadin
- Population (2021): 174
- Time zone: UTC+3 (TRT)

Ortakarabağ is a village in the Bolvadin District, Afyonkarahisar Province, Turkey. Its population is 174 (2021).
