= Karayokuş, Bolvadin =

Karayokuş
- Village
- Location within Turkey Location within Turkey Aegean
- Coordinates: 38°48′N 31°07′E
- Country: Turkey
- Province: Afyonkarahisar
- District: Bolvadin
- Population (2021): 932
- Time zone: UTC+3 (TRT)

Karayokuş is a village in the Bolvadin District, Afyonkarahisar Province, Turkey. Its population is 932 (2021).
