= Akçaşar, Sinanpaşa =

Akçaşar
- Village
- Location within Turkey Location within Turkey Aegean
- Coordinates: 38.8485°N 30.1540°E
- Country: Turkey
- Province: Afyonkarahisar
- District: Sinanpaşa
- Population (2021): 193
- Time zone: UTC+3 (TRT)

Akçaşar is a village in the Sinanpaşa District, Afyonkarahisar Province, Turkey. Its population is 193 (2021).
