= Balmahmut, Sinanpaşa =

Balmahmut
- Village
- Location within Turkey Location within Turkey Aegean
- Coordinates: 38°48′N 30°20′E
- Country: Turkey
- Province: Afyonkarahisar
- District: Sinanpaşa
- Population (2021): 487
- Time zone: UTC+3 (TRT)

Balmahmut is a village in the Sinanpaşa District, Afyonkarahisar Province, Turkey. Its population is 487 (2021).
