= Elvanpaşa, Sinanpaşa =

Elvanpaşa
- Village
- Location within Turkey Location within Turkey Aegean
- Coordinates: 38°47′N 30°03′E
- Country: Turkey
- Province: Afyonkarahisar
- District: Sinanpaşa
- Population (2021): 297
- Time zone: UTC+3 (TRT)

Elvanpaşa is a village in the Sinanpaşa District, Afyonkarahisar Province, Turkey. Its population is 297 (2021).
