= Akdeğirmen, Sinanpaşa =

Akdeğirmen
- Village
- Location within Turkey Location within Turkey Aegean
- Coordinates: 38.8116°N 30.2250°E
- Country: Turkey
- Province: Afyonkarahisar
- District: Sinanpaşa
- Population (2021): 109
- Time zone: UTC+3 (TRT)

Akdeğirmen (formerly: Kumarı) is a village in the Sinanpaşa District, Afyonkarahisar Province, Turkey. Its population is 109 (2021).
