= Ayvalı, Sinanpaşa =

Ayvalı
- Village
- Location within Turkey Location within Turkey Aegean
- Coordinates: 38°48′28″N 30°15′14″E
- Country: Turkey
- Province: Afyonkarahisar
- District: Sinanpaşa
- Population (2021): 167
- Time zone: UTC+3 (TRT)

Ayvalı is a village in the Sinanpaşa District, Afyonkarahisar Province, Turkey. Its population is 167 (2021).
