= Doğancık, Sultandağı =

Doğancık
- Village
- Location within Turkey Location within Turkey Aegean
- Coordinates: 38°33′10″N 31°11′58″E
- Country: Turkey
- Province: Afyonkarahisar
- District: Sultandağı
- Population (2021): 197
- Time zone: UTC+3 (TRT)

Doğancık is a village in the Sultandağı District, Afyonkarahisar Province, Turkey. Its population is 197 (2021).
