= Yörükmezarı, Sinanpaşa =

Yörükmezarı
- Village
- Location within Turkey Location within Turkey Aegean
- Coordinates: 38°42′10″N 30°07′59″E
- Country: Turkey
- Province: Afyonkarahisar
- District: Sinanpaşa
- Population (2021): 122
- Time zone: UTC+3 (TRT)

Yörükmezarı is a village in the Sinanpaşa District, Afyonkarahisar Province, Turkey. Its population is 122 (2021).
