= Çatkuyu, Sinanpaşa =

Çatkuyu
- Village
- Location within Turkey Location within Turkey Aegean
- Coordinates: 38°52′N 30°17′E
- Country: Turkey
- Province: Afyonkarahisar
- District: Sinanpaşa
- Population (2021): 53
- Time zone: UTC+3 (TRT)

Çatkuyu is a village in the Sinanpaşa District, Afyonkarahisar Province, Turkey. Its population is 53 (2021).
