= Gezler, Sinanpaşa =

Gezler
- Village
- Location within Turkey Location within Turkey Aegean
- Coordinates: 38°44′N 30°25′E
- Country: Turkey
- Province: Afyonkarahisar
- District: Sinanpaşa
- Population (2021): 156
- Time zone: UTC+3 (TRT)

Gezler is a village in the Sinanpaşa District, Afyonkarahisar Province, Turkey. Its population is 156 (2021).
