= Akşehir (disambiguation) =

Akşehir is a town in Turkey.

Akşehir may also refer to one of the following places in Turkey:

- Akşehir district
- Lake Akşehir
