= Yürükkaracaören, Bolvadin =

Yürükkaracaören
- Village
- Location within Turkey Location within Turkey Aegean
- Coordinates: 38.8286°N 31.0908°E
- Country: Turkey
- Province: Afyonkarahisar
- District: Bolvadin
- Population (2021): 284
- Time zone: UTC+3 (TRT)

Yürükkaracaören is a village in the Bolvadin District, Afyonkarahisar Province, Turkey. Its population is 284 (2021).
