= Karakışla, Sultandağı =

Karakışla
- Village
- Location within Turkey Location within Turkey Aegean
- Coordinates: 38°44′37″N 31°31′17″E
- Country: Turkey
- Province: Afyonkarahisar
- District: Sultandağı
- Population (2021): 109
- Time zone: UTC+3 (TRT)

Karakışla is a village in the Sultandağı District, Afyonkarahisar Province, Turkey. Its population is 109 (2021).
