= Nuh, Sinanpaşa =

Nuh
- Village
- Location within Turkey Location within Turkey Aegean
- Country: Turkey
- Province: Afyonkarahisar
- District: Sinanpaşa
- Population (2021): 726
- Time zone: UTC+3 (TRT)

Nuh is a village in the Sinanpaşa District, Afyonkarahisar Province, Turkey. Its population is 726 (2021). Before the 2013 reorganisation, it was a town (belde).
