= Erkmen =

Erkmen is a Turkish surname. Notable people with the surname include:

- Ayşe Erkmen (born 1949), Turkish artist
- Hayrettin Erkmen (1915–1999), Turkish politician
- Hüseyin Erkmen (1915–?), Turkish sport wrestler
- Muhlis Erkmen (1891–1985), Turkish farmer and politician
- Nizamettin Erkmen (1919–1990), Turkish politician

== See also ==
Erkmen, Afyonkarahisar
