= Çukurcak, Sultandağı =

Çukurcak
- Village
- Location within Turkey Location within Turkey Aegean
- Coordinates: 38°42′N 31°22′E
- Country: Turkey
- Province: Afyonkarahisar
- District: Sultandağı
- Population (2021): 286
- Time zone: UTC+3 (TRT)

Çukurcak is a village in the Sultandağı District, Afyonkarahisar Province, Turkey. Its population is 286 (2021).
