= Kırca, Sultandağı =

Kırca
- Village
- Location within Turkey Location within Turkey Aegean
- Coordinates: 38°30′N 31°14′E
- Country: Turkey
- Province: Afyonkarahisar
- District: Sultandağı
- Population (2021): 1,207
- Time zone: UTC+3 (TRT)

Kırca is a village in the Sultandağı District, Afyonkarahisar Province, Turkey. Its population is 1,207 (2021). Before the 2013 reorganisation, it was a town (belde).
