= Nusratlı, Bolvadin =

Nusratlı
- Village
- Location within Turkey Location within Turkey Aegean
- Country: Turkey
- Province: Afyonkarahisar
- District: Bolvadin
- Population (2021): 84
- Time zone: UTC+3 (TRT)

Nusratlı is a village in the Bolvadin District, Afyonkarahisar Province, Turkey. Its population is 84 (2021).
