= Derekarabağ, Bolvadin =

Derekarabağ
- Village
- Location within Turkey Location within Turkey Aegean
- Coordinates: 38°43′N 31°11′E
- Country: Turkey
- Province: Afyonkarahisar
- District: Bolvadin
- Population (2021): 778
- Time zone: UTC+3 (TRT)

Derekarabağ is a village in the Bolvadin District, Afyonkarahisar Province, Turkey. Its population is 778 (2021).
