= Akkoyunlu, Çobanlar =

Akkoyunlu
- Village
- Location within Turkey Location within Turkey Aegean
- Coordinates: 38.7833°N 30.9000°E
- Country: Turkey
- Province: Afyonkarahisar
- District: Çobanlar
- Population (2021): 362
- Time zone: UTC+3 (TRT)

Akkoyunlu is a village in the Çobanlar District, Afyonkarahisar Province, Turkey. Its population is 362 (2021).

The current languages spoken are Turkish, Kurdish, Azerbaijani, and Avaric.
