= Tokuşlar, Sinanpaşa =

Tokuşlar
- Village
- Location within Turkey Location within Turkey Aegean
- Country: Turkey
- Province: Afyonkarahisar
- District: Sinanpaşa
- Population (2021): 1,091
- Time zone: UTC+3 (TRT)

Tokuşlar is a village in the Sinanpaşa District, Afyonkarahisar Province, Turkey. Its population is 1,091 (2021). Before the 2013 reorganisation, it was a town (belde).
