= Phyteia =

Byzantine town of Phrygia

Coordinates: 38°53′41″N 31°03′56″E

Phyteia (Greek: Φυτεία) was a town of ancient Phrygia, inhabited during Byzantine times.

Its site is located near Kemerkaya in Asiatic Turkey.
