= Taşağıl, Bolvadin =

Taşağıl
- Village
- Location within Turkey Location within Turkey Aegean
- Coordinates: 38.7925°N 31.0947°E
- Country: Turkey
- Province: Afyonkarahisar
- District: Bolvadin
- Population (2021): 49
- Time zone: UTC+3 (TRT)

Taşağıl is a village in the Bolvadin District, Afyonkarahisar Province, Turkey. Its population is 49 (2021).
