= Taşlıdere, Bolvadin =

Taşlıdere
- Village
- Location within Turkey Location within Turkey Aegean
- Coordinates: 38.8225°N 31.0946°E
- Country: Turkey
- Province: Afyonkarahisar
- District: Bolvadin
- Population (2021): 112
- Time zone: UTC+3 (TRT)

Taşlıdere is a village in the Bolvadin District, Afyonkarahisar Province, Turkey. Its population is 112 (2021).
