= Bulca =

Bulca or Bulcă may refer to

- Bulca, Sinanpaşa, a village in Turkey
- Fuat Bulca (1881–1962), Turkish military officer and politician
- Ioana Bulcă (born 1936-2025), Romanian film actress
