= Kayadibi, Sinanpaşa =

Kayadibi
- Village
- Location within Turkey Location within Turkey Aegean
- Coordinates: 38°43′24″N 30°23′51″E
- Country: Turkey
- Province: Afyonkarahisar
- District: Sinanpaşa
- Population (2021): 707
- Time zone: UTC+3 (TRT)

Kayadibi is a village in the Sinanpaşa District, Afyonkarahisar Province, Turkey. Its population is 707 (2021).
