= Dipevler, Bolvadin =

Dipevler
- Village
- Location within Turkey Location within Turkey Aegean
- Coordinates: 38°44′N 31°06′E
- Country: Turkey
- Province: Afyonkarahisar
- District: Bolvadin
- Population (2021): 630
- Time zone: UTC+3 (TRT)

Dipevler is a village in the Bolvadin District, Afyonkarahisar Province, Turkey. Its population is 630 (2021).
