= Taşköprü, Sultandağı =

Taşköprü
- Village
- Location within Turkey Location within Turkey Aegean
- Coordinates: 38°34′N 31°18′E
- Country: Turkey
- Province: Afyonkarahisar
- District: Sultandağı
- Population (2021): 94
- Time zone: UTC+3 (TRT)

Taşköprü is a village in the Sultandağı District, Afyonkarahisar Province, Turkey. Its population is 94 (2021).
