= Boyalı, Sinanpaşa =

Boyalı
- Village
- Location within Turkey Location within Turkey Aegean
- Coordinates: 38.7656°N 30.4004°E
- Country: Turkey
- Province: Afyonkarahisar
- District: Sinanpaşa
- Population (2021): 671
- Time zone: UTC+3 (TRT)

Boyalı is a village in the Sinanpaşa District, Afyonkarahisar Province, Turkey. Its population is 671 (2021).
