= Yıldırımkemal, Sinanpaşa =

Yıldırımkemal
- Village
- Location within Turkey Location within Turkey Aegean
- Coordinates: 38°52′N 30°08′E
- Country: Turkey
- Province: Afyonkarahisar
- District: Sinanpaşa
- Population (2021): 176
- Time zone: UTC+3 (TRT)

Yıldırımkemal is a village in the Sinanpaşa District, Afyonkarahisar Province, Turkey. Its population is 176 (2021).
