= Çobanözü, Sinanpaşa =

Çobanözü
- Village
- Location within Turkey Location within Turkey Aegean
- Country: Turkey
- Province: Afyonkarahisar
- District: Sinanpaşa
- Population (2021): 763
- Time zone: UTC+3 (TRT)

Çobanözü is a village in the Sinanpaşa District, Afyonkarahisar Province, Turkey. Its population is 763 (2021).

== Geography ==
The village lies approximately 12 kilometers south of the district center, Sinanpaşa, and about 40 kilometers northwest of the provincial capital, Afyonkarahisar.
