= Kocatepe =

Kocatepe is a Turkish word and may refer to:

== People ==
- Yasin Kocatepe (born 1991), Turkish professional footballer

== Places ==
- Kocatepe (Istanbul Metro), a rapid transit station on the M1 line of the Istanbul Metro, Turkey
- Kocatepe Mosque, the largest mosque in Ankara, Turkey
- Afyon Kocatepe University, a state university in Afyonkarahisar, Turkey
- Kocatepe, Afyonkarahisar, a town in Afyonkarahisar Province, Turkey

== Other uses ==
- TCG Kocatepe, three warships operated by the Turkish Navy
