= Bolvadin =

- Municipality
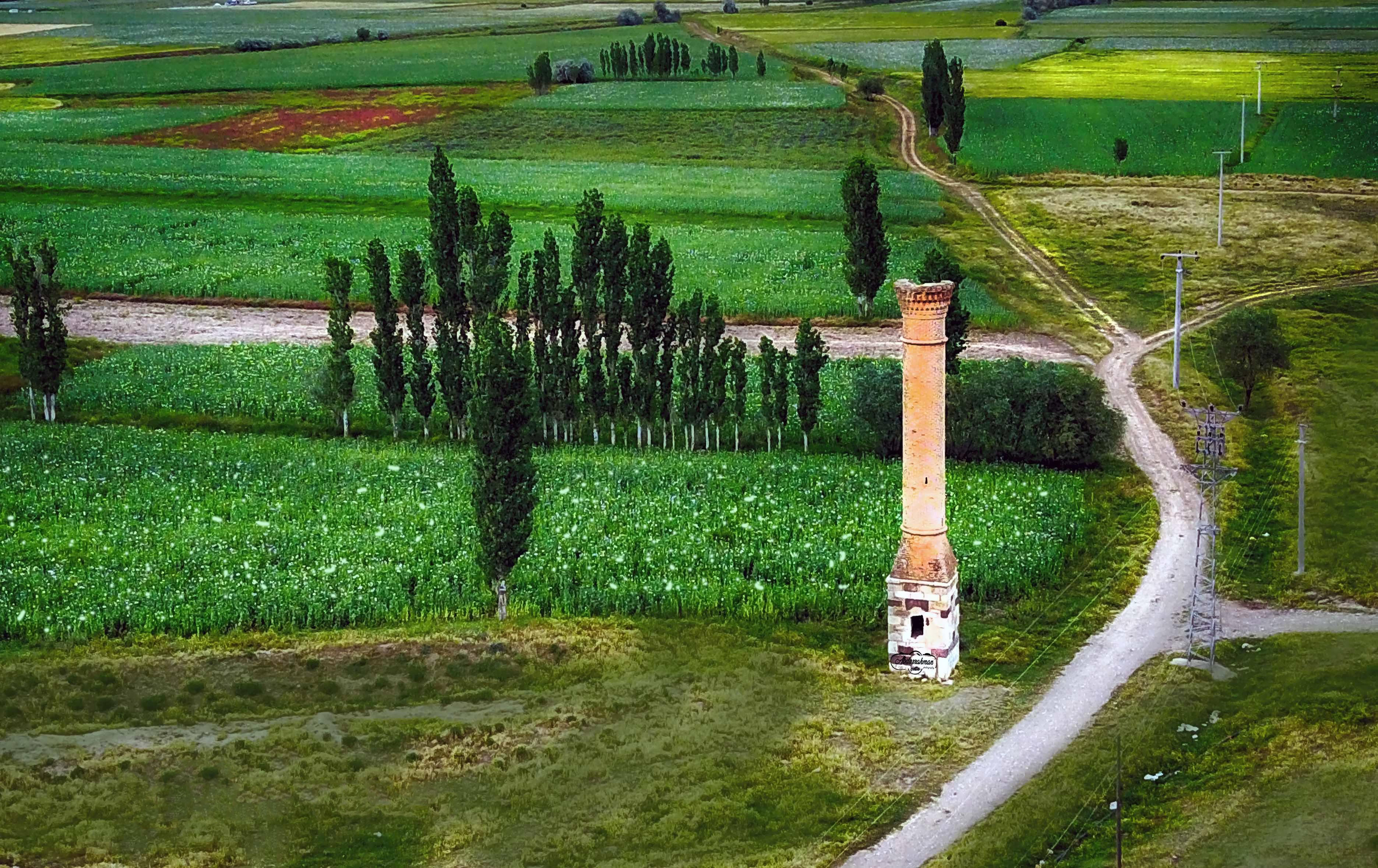

- Location within Turkey Location within Turkey Aegean
- Coordinates: 38°43′N 31°3′E
- Country: Turkey
- Province: Afyonkarahisar
- District: Bolvadin

Government
  - Mayor: Derviş Aynaci (MHP)
- Elevation: 1,016 m (3,333 ft)
- Population (2024): 45,468
- Time zone: UTC+3 (TRT)
- Climate: Csb
- Website: www.bolvadinbelediyesi.com

Bolvadin (Ancient Greek: Πολύβοτον/Πολύβοτος and Latin: Polybotum/Polybotus) is a city of Afyonkarahisar Province in Turkey. It is the seat of Bolvadin District. Bolvadin district has a total population of 45,468 according to the 2024 census. It has an altitude of 1,016 m. The mayor is Derviş Aynaci (MHP).

Bolvadin is the third-largest town in the province, after Afyonkarahisar and Sandıklı, built on a large fertile plain between the mountains of Sultandağ and Emirdağ inland from the Aegean coast.

== History ==
The city was founded in very early times. It was part of Phrygia. In the Roman era it was known as Polybotum and a castle was built here. It then passed into the hands of the Seljuk Turks and then the Ottoman Empire, known as a strategic bridge in the mountains.

From 1867 until 1922, Bolvadin was part of the Hüdavendigâr vilayet of the Ottoman Empire. Bolvadin was occupied by Greek troops during the Turkish War of Independence, until September 1922.

== Bolvadin today ==
The plain is watered by the river Akarçay and is a rich agricultural land. Opium was grown in the area and is still grown today; there is a factory here producing morphine for the pharmaceutical industry. However today the plain is also used for growing grain and fruit. The higher mountainside is forested. The climate is hot in summer, cold in winter. Lake Eber lies at the south-east edge of the plain, 967 m above sea level. Carp fishing and cutting rushes contribute to the economy of this farming district. This is not a rich region, it lacks infrastructure such as public transport and the people of Bolvadin are conservative.

Bolvadin is renowned for its cream made of buffalo milk.

The area is vulnerable to earthquakes.
