= Kaleköy (disambiguation) =

Kaleköy is a village in the Antalya province, Turkey, over the ruins of ancient Sinema.

Kaleköy can also refer to:

- Kaleköy, Amasya, Amasya Province, Turkey
- Kaleköy, Gökçeada
- Kaleköy, Ilgaz
- Kaleköy, Kurucaşile, Bartin Province, Turkey
- Kaleköy, Çobanlar, Afyonkarahisar Province, Turkey
