= Göynük, Çobanlar =

Göynük
- Village
- Location within Turkey Location within Turkey Aegean
- Coordinates: 38.7839°N 30.8569°E
- Country: Turkey
- Province: Afyonkarahisar
- District: Çobanlar
- Population (2021): 977
- Time zone: UTC+3 (TRT)

Göynük is a village in the Çobanlar District, Afyonkarahisar Province, Turkey. Its population is 977 (2021).
