= Karapınar, Sultandağı =

Karapınar
- Village
- Location within Turkey Location within Turkey Aegean
- Coordinates: 38°42′10″N 31°25′41″E
- Country: Turkey
- Province: Afyonkarahisar
- District: Sultandağı
- Population (2021): 648
- Time zone: UTC+3 (TRT)

Karapınar is a village in the Sultandağı District, Afyonkarahisar Province, Turkey. Its population is 648 (2021). Before the 2013 reorganisation, it was a town (belde).
