= Karacaören, Sinanpaşa =

Karacaören
- Village
- Location within Turkey Location within Turkey Aegean
- Country: Turkey
- Province: Afyonkarahisar
- District: Sinanpaşa
- Population (2021): 343
- Time zone: UTC+3 (TRT)

Karacaören is a village in the Sinanpaşa District, Afyonkarahisar Province, Turkey. Its population is 343 (2021).
