= Saraycık, Sinanpaşa =

Saraycık
- Village
- Location within Turkey Location within Turkey Aegean
- Country: Turkey
- Province: Afyonkarahisar
- District: Sinanpaşa
- Population (2021): 238
- Time zone: UTC+3 (TRT)

Saraycık is a village in the Sinanpaşa District, Afyonkarahisar Province, Turkey. Its population is 238 (2021).
