= Yenikarabağ, Sultandağı =

Yenikarabağ
- Village
- Location within Turkey Location within Turkey Aegean
- Coordinates: 38°38′N 31°19′E
- Country: Turkey
- Province: Afyonkarahisar
- District: Sultandağı
- Population (2021): 74
- Time zone: UTC+3 (TRT)

Yenikarabağ is a village in the Sultandağı District, Afyonkarahisar Province, Turkey. Its population is 74 (2021).
