= Çamözü, Sultandağı =

Çamözü
- Village
- Location within Turkey Location within Turkey Aegean
- Coordinates: 38°28′N 31°16′E
- Country: Turkey
- Province: Afyonkarahisar
- District: Sultandağı
- Population (2021): 456
- Time zone: UTC+3 (TRT)

Çamözü is a village in the Sultandağı District, Afyonkarahisar Province, Turkey. Its population is 456 (2021).
