= Akören, Sinanpaşa =

Akören
- Municipality
- Location in Turkey Akören (Turkey Aegean)
- Coordinates: 38.7722°N 30.3720°E
- Country: Turkey
- Province: Afyonkarahisar
- District: Sinanpaşa
- Population (2021): 3,078
- Time zone: UTC+3 (TRT)

Akören is a town (belde) and municipality in the Sinanpaşa District, Afyonkarahisar Province, Turkey. Its population is 3,078 (2021).
