= Dereçine, Sultandağı =

Dereçine
- Municipality
- Location in Turkey Dereçine (Turkey Aegean)
- Coordinates: 38°29′N 31°15′E
- Country: Turkey
- Province: Afyonkarahisar
- District: Sultandağı
- Population (2021): 2,017
- Time zone: UTC+3 (TRT)

Dereçine is a town (belde) and municipality in the Sultandağı District, Afyonkarahisar Province, Turkey. Its population is 2,017 (2021).
