= Küçükhüyük, Sinanpaşa =

Village in Afyonkarahisar Province, Turkey

Küçükhüyük
- Municipality
- Location in Turkey Küçükhüyük (Turkey Aegean)
- Coordinates: 38°46′N 30°18′E
- Country: Turkey
- Province: Afyonkarahisar
- District: Sinanpaşa
- Population (2021): 1,934
- Time zone: UTC+3 (TRT)

Küçükhüyük is a town (belde) and municipality in the Sinanpaşa District, Afyonkarahisar Province, Turkey. Its population is 1,934 (2021).
