= Taşoluk, Sinanpaşa =

Taşoluk
- Municipality
- Location in Turkey Taşoluk (Turkey Aegean)
- Coordinates: 38°36′N 30°21′E
- Country: Turkey
- Province: Afyonkarahisar
- District: Sinanpaşa
- Population (2021): 3,685
- Time zone: UTC+3 (TRT)

Taşoluk is a town (belde) and municipality in the Sinanpaşa District, Afyonkarahisar Province, Turkey. Its population is 3,685 (2021).
