= TCG Kocatepe =

TCG Kocatepe may refer to a number of warships operated by the Turkish Naval Forces:

- TCG Kocatepe (D 354), an American Gearing-class destroyer, in operation from 1971 to 1974
- TCG Kocatepe (1945), an American Gearing-class destroyer, in operation from 1974 to 1994
- TCG Kocatepe (F-252), an American Knox-class frigate, formerly FF-1063 USS Reasoner, in operation from 2002 to 2005

== See also ==
- Kocatepe (disambiguation)
