= Düzağaç, Sinanpaşa =

Düzağaç
- Municipality
- Location in Turkey Düzağaç (Turkey Aegean)
- Coordinates: 38°48′N 30°10′E
- Country: Turkey
- Province: Afyonkarahisar
- District: Sinanpaşa
- Population (2021): 1,998
- Time zone: UTC+3 (TRT)

Düzağaç is a town (belde) and municipality in the Sinanpaşa District, Afyonkarahisar Province, Turkey. Its population is 1,998 (2021).
