= Kocaöz, Çobanlar =

Kocaöz
- Municipality
- Location in Turkey Kocaöz (Turkey Aegean)
- Coordinates: 38°44′N 30°51′E
- Country: Turkey
- Province: Afyonkarahisar
- District: Çobanlar
- Population (2021): 2,777
- Time zone: UTC+3 (TRT)

Kocaöz is a town (belde) and municipality in the Çobanlar District, Afyonkarahisar Province, Turkey. Its population is 2,777 (2021).
