= Tınaztepe, Sinanpaşa =

Town (belde) in Sinanpaşa District, Afyonkarahisar Province

Tınaztepe
- Municipality
- Location in Turkey Tınaztepe (Turkey Aegean)
- Coordinates: 38°44′N 30°23′E
- Country: Turkey
- Province: Afyonkarahisar
- District: Sinanpaşa
- Population (2021): 2,928
- Time zone: UTC+3 (TRT)

Tınaztepe is a town (belde) and municipality in the Sinanpaşa District, Afyonkarahisar Province, Turkey. Its population is 2,928 (2021).
