= Bolvadin District =

- District
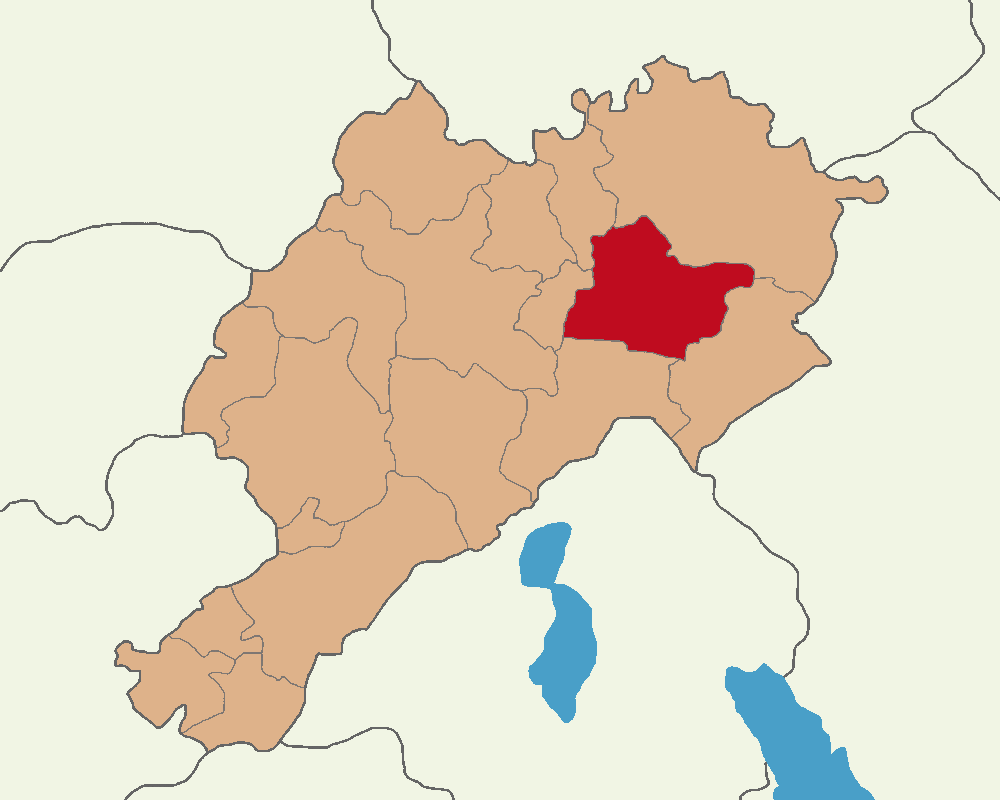
- Map showing Bolvadin District in Afyonkarahisar Province

- Location in Turkey Bolvadin District (Turkey Aegean)
- Coordinates: 38°43′N 31°3′E
- Country: Turkey
- Province: Afyonkarahisar
- Seat: Bolvadin
- Area: 944 km^{2} (364 sq mi)
- Population (2021): 45,944
  - Density: 48.7/km^{2} (126/sq mi)
- Time zone: UTC+3 (TRT)

Bolvadin District is a district of Afyonkarahisar Province of Turkey. Its seat is the town Bolvadin. Its area is 944 km^{2}, and its population is 45,944 (2021).

== Composition ==
There are three municipalities in Bolvadin District:

- Bolvadin
- Dişli
- Özburun

There are 14 villages in Bolvadin District:

- Büyükkarabağ
- Derekarabağ
- Dipevler
- Güney
- Hamidiye
- Karayokuş
- Kemerkaya
- Kurucaova
- Kutlu
- Nusratlı
- Ortakarabağ
- Taşağıl
- Taşlıdere
- Yürükkaracaören
