= Çıkrık, Afyonkarahisar =

Çıkrık
- Municipality
- Location in Turkey Çıkrık (Turkey Aegean)
- Coordinates: 38°52′28″N 30°36′36″E
- Country: Turkey
- Province: Afyonkarahisar
- District: Afyonkarahisar
- Population (2021): 2,398
- Time zone: UTC+3 (TRT)

Çıkrık is a town (belde) and municipality in the Afyonkarahisar District, Afyonkarahisar Province, Turkey. Its population is 2,398 (2021).
