= Sinanpaşa District =

- District
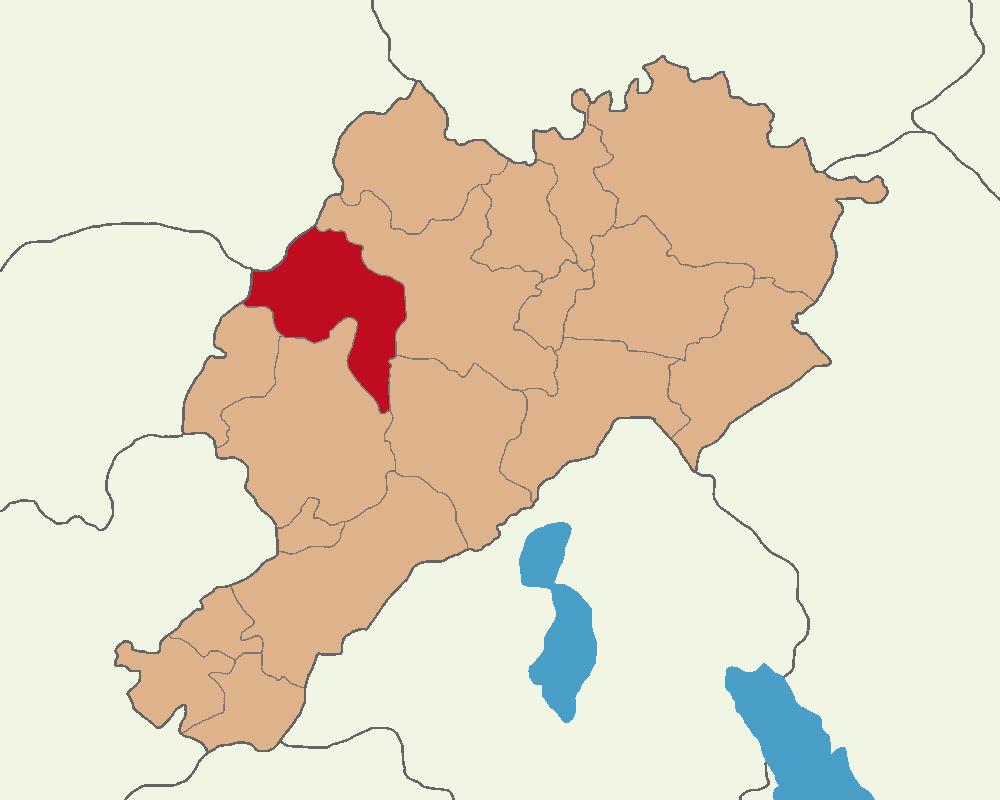
- Map showing Sinanpaşa District in Afyonkarahisar Province

- Location in Turkey Sinanpaşa District (Turkey Aegean)
- Coordinates: 38°45′N 30°15′E
- Country: Turkey
- Province: Afyonkarahisar
- Seat: Sinanpaşa
- Area: 889 km^{2} (343 sq mi)
- Population (2021): 38,830
  - Density: 43.7/km^{2} (113/sq mi)
- Time zone: UTC+3 (TRT)

Sinanpaşa District is a district of Afyonkarahisar Province of Turkey. Its seat is the town Sinanpaşa. Its area is 889 km^{2}, and its population is 38,830 (2021).

== Composition ==
There are 11 municipalities in Sinanpaşa District:

- Ahmetpaşa
- Akören
- Düzağaç
- Güney
- Kılıçarslan
- Kırka
- Küçükhüyük
- Serban
- Sinanpaşa
- Taşoluk
- Tınaztepe

There are 24 villages in Sinanpaşa District:

- Akçaşar
- Akdeğirmen
- Ayvalı
- Balmahmut
- Başkimse
- Boyalı
- Bulca
- Çatkuyu
- Çayhisar
- Çobanözü
- Elvanpaşa
- Eyice
- Garipçe
- Gezler
- İğdeli
- Karacaören
- Kayadibi
- Kınık
- Nuh
- Saraycık
- Tazlar
- Tokuşlar
- Yıldırımkemal
- Yörükmezarı
