= Kaleköy, Çobanlar =

Kaleköy
- Village
- Location within Turkey Location within Turkey Aegean
- Country: Turkey
- Province: Afyonkarahisar
- District: Çobanlar
- Population (2021): 825
- Time zone: UTC+3 (TRT)

Kaleköy (also: Kale) is a village in the Çobanlar District, Afyonkarahisar Province, Turkey. Its population is 825 (2021).
