= Sultandağı District =

- District
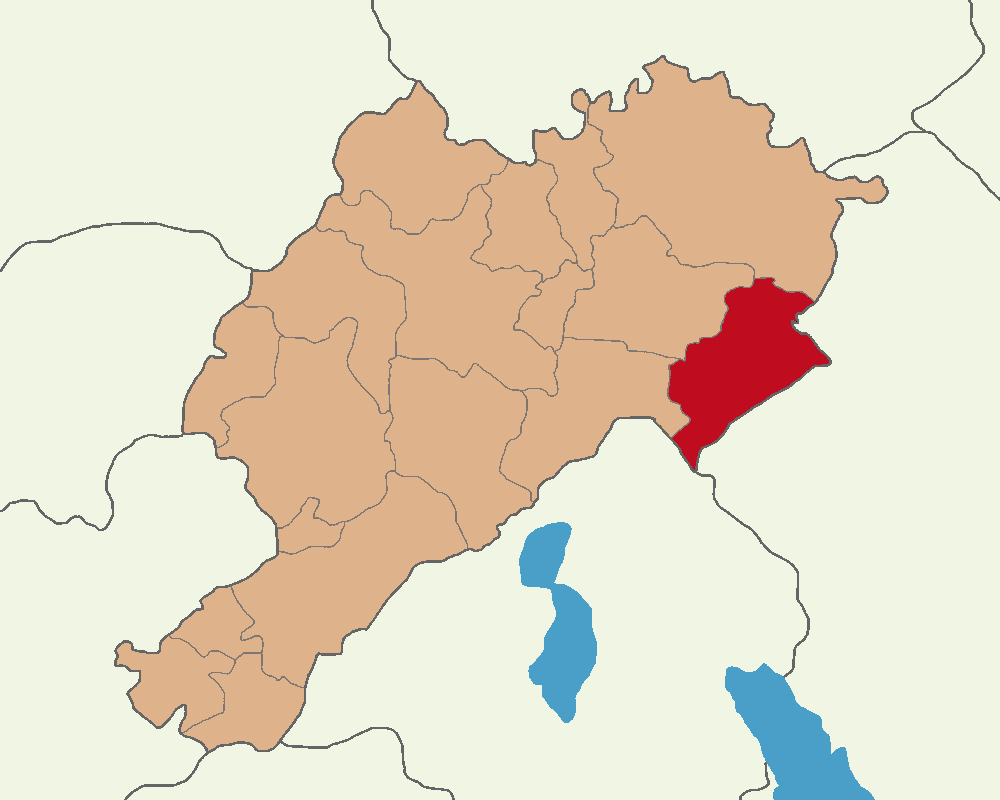
- Map showing Sultandağı District in Afyonkarahisar Province

- Location in Turkey Sultandağı District (Turkey Aegean)
- Coordinates: 38°32′N 31°14′E
- Country: Turkey
- Province: Afyonkarahisar
- Seat: Sultandağı
- Area: 928 km^{2} (358 sq mi)
- Population (2021): 14,279
  - Density: 15.4/km^{2} (39.9/sq mi)
- Time zone: UTC+3 (TRT)

Sultandağı District is a district of Afyonkarahisar Province of Turkey. Its seat is the town Sultandağı. Its area is 928 km^{2}, and its population is 14,279 (2021).

== Composition ==
There are three municipalities in Sultandağı District:

- Dereçine
- Sultandağı
- Yeşilçiftlik

There are 11 villages in Sultandağı District:

- Akbaba
- Çamözü
- Çukurcak
- Doğancık
- Karakışla
- Karapınar
- Kırca
- Taşköprü
- Üçkuyu
- Yakasinek
- Yenikarabağ
