= Özburun, Bolvadin =

Coordinates: 38.8283°N 31.0042°E

Özburun
- Municipality
- Location in Turkey Özburun (Turkey Aegean)
- Coordinates
- Country: Turkey
- Province: Afyonkarahisar
- District: Bolvadin
- Population (2021): 2,094
- Time zone: UTC+3 (TRT)

Özburun is a town (belde) and municipality in the Bolvadin District, Afyonkarahisar Province, Turkey. Its population is 2,094 (2021).
