= Ariadne of Phrygia =

2nd-century Christian saint

Saint Ariadne
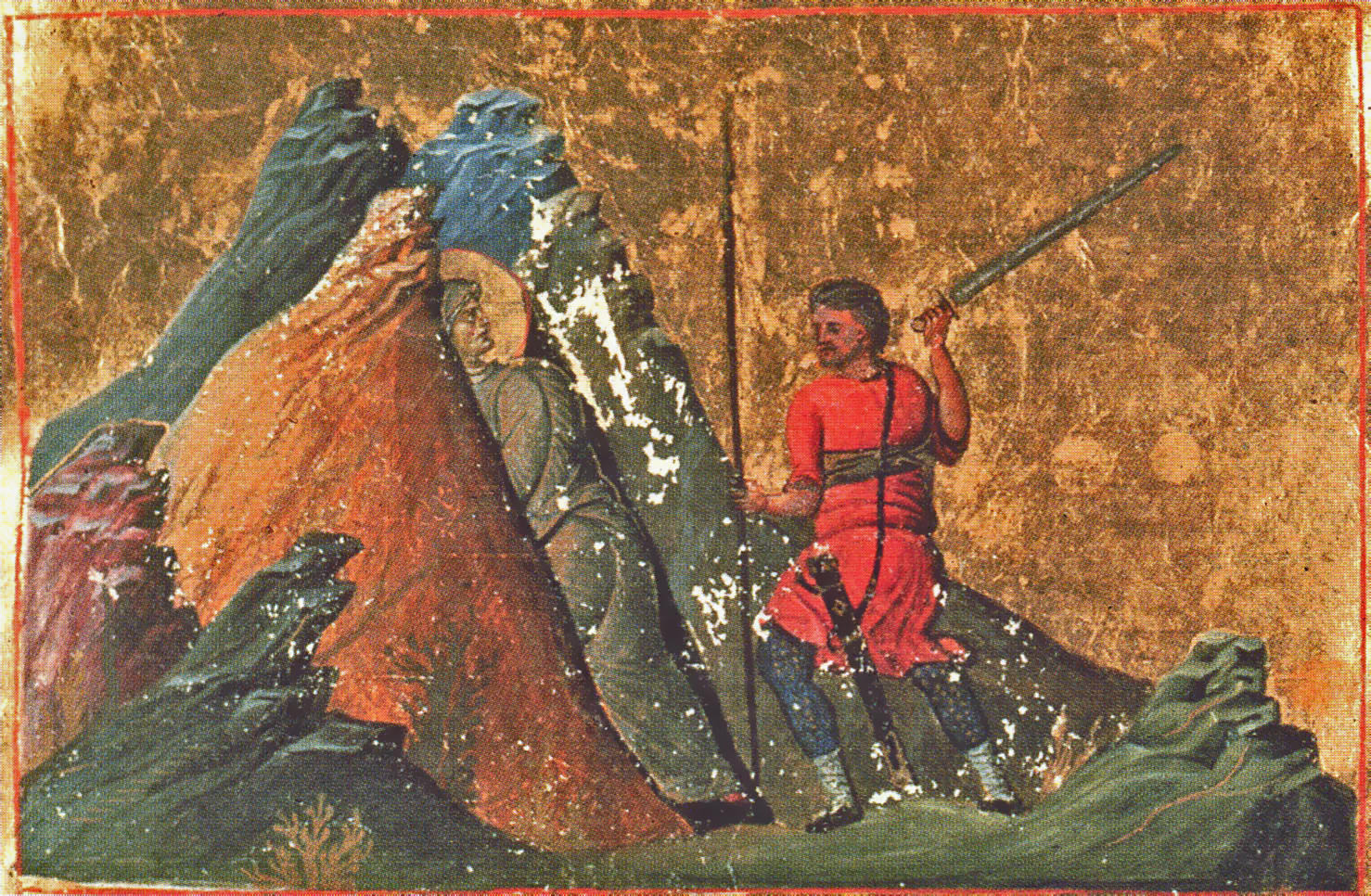
- Died: 130 AD
- Venerated in: Eastern Orthodox Church; Oriental Orthodoxy; Church of the East; Roman Catholic Church; Anglican Communion
- Canonized: Pre-congregation
- Feast: 18 September (Eastern Christianity); 17 September (General Roman Calendar)

Saint Ariadne of Phrygia (Greek: Άριάδνη; died 130 AD) is a 2nd-century Christian saint and martyr.

== Biography ==
Ariadne was a slave woman to a certain Tertullus in Prymnessus when by an alleged edict of Hadrian and Antoninus, Christianity was outlawed. When she refused to partake in the pagan rituals on the birthday of Tertullus's son, she was punished and her case became known to the provincial governor Gordios.

Both she and Tertullus were convened before a tribunal where Tertullus was acquitted while she was condemned to be crucified. The people of Prymnessus intervened on her behalf to give her three days of repentance in which she then escaped the Roman authorities, fleeing into the nearby mountains where she was saved from her pursuers by being swallowed up by the earth.

== Sources ==
The only source about her life is a short Greek hagiographic text, dating to the fourth or fifth century, conserved in the Vatican on a palimpsest from the ninth or tenth century. It is possible that it is based on an older, non-existing hagiography and although it seems that parts are fictitious and a part of it is based on an inscription mentioning a Tiberius Claudius Vibianus Tertullus.
