= Çobanlar District =

- District
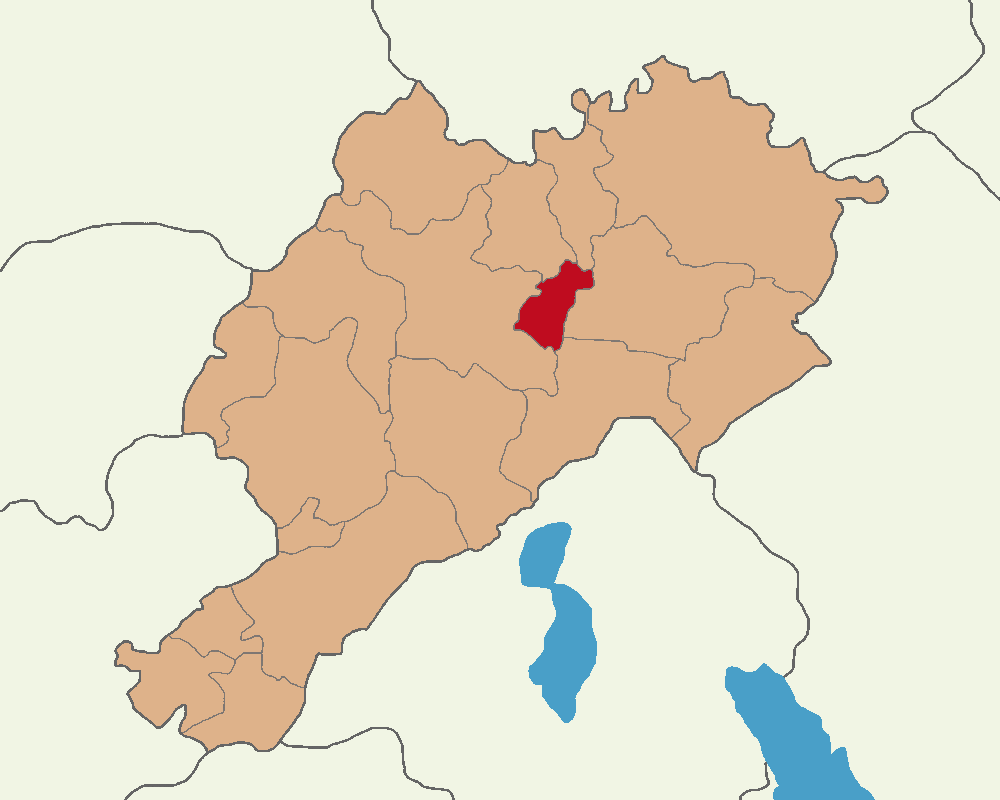
- Map showing Çobanlar District in Afyonkarahisar Province

- Location in Turkey Çobanlar District (Turkey Aegean)
- Coordinates: 38°42′N 30°47′E
- Country: Turkey
- Province: Afyonkarahisar
- Seat: Çobanlar
- Area: 165 km^{2} (64 sq mi)
- Population (2021): 14,131
  - Density: 85.6/km^{2} (222/sq mi)
- Time zone: UTC+3 (TRT)

Çobanlar District is a district of Afyonkarahisar Province of Turkey. Its seat is the town Çobanlar. Its area is 165 km^{2}, and its population is 14,131 (2021).

== Composition ==
There are two municipalities in Çobanlar District:

- Çobanlar
- Kocaöz

There are 3 villages in Çobanlar District:

- Akkoyunlu
- Göynük
- Kaleköy
