= Serban, Sinanpaşa =

Serban
- Municipality
- Location in Turkey Serban (Turkey Aegean)
- Coordinates: 38°39′N 30°21′E
- Country: Turkey
- Province: Afyonkarahisar
- District: Sinanpaşa
- Population (2021): 1,565
- Time zone: UTC+3 (TRT)

Serban (formerly: Savran) is a town (belde) and municipality in the Sinanpaşa District, Afyonkarahisar Province, Turkey. Its population is 1,565 (2021).
