= Dişli, Bolvadin =

Dişli
- Municipality
- Location in Turkey Dişli (Turkey Aegean)
- Coordinates: 38°47′27″N 31°01′34″E
- Country: Turkey
- Province: Afyonkarahisar
- District: Bolvadin
- Population (2021): 2,946
- Time zone: UTC+3 (TRT)

Dişli is a town (belde) and municipality in the Bolvadin District, Afyonkarahisar Province, Turkey. Its population is 2,946 (2021).
