= Kemerkaya, Bolvadin =

Kemerkaya
- Village
- Location within Turkey Location within Turkey Aegean
- Country: Turkey
- Province: Afyonkarahisar
- District: Bolvadin
- Population (2021): 1,730
- Time zone: UTC+3 (TRT)

Kemerkaya is a village in the Bolvadin District, Afyonkarahisar Province, Turkey. Its population is 1,730 (2021). Before the 2013 reorganisation, it was a town (belde).
