= Çobanlar =

- Municipality
- Location within Turkey Location within Turkey Aegean
- Coordinates: 38°42′N 30°47′E
- Country: Turkey
- Province: Afyonkarahisar
- District: Çobanlar

Government
  - Mayor: Ali Altuntaş (AKP)
- Elevation: 990 m (3,250 ft)
- Population (2024): 14,403
- Time zone: UTC+3 (TRT)
- Climate: Csb
- Website: www.cobanlar.bel.tr

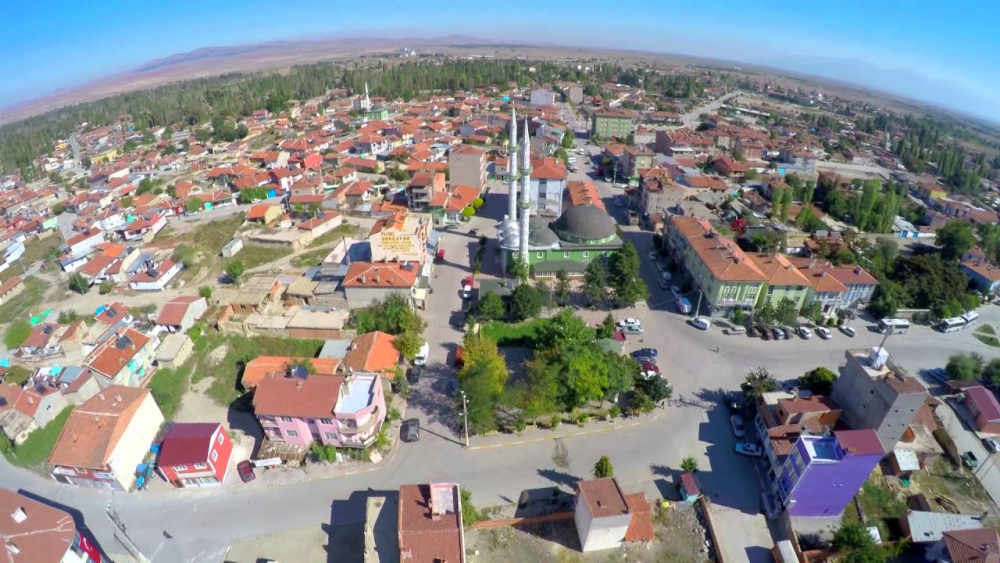

Çobanlar (Ancient Greek: Αναβωρα, Anabora) is a town of Afyonkarahisar Province in the Aegean region of Turkey. It lies in a plain 25 km east of the city of Afyon. It is the seat of Çobanlar District. Çobanlar district has a total population of 14,403 according to the 2024 census. Çobanlar is 990 m above sea level. In the South Çobanlar's Bey Mountain, in the west Çobanlar's Sultan Mountains. The mayor is Ali Altuntaş (AKP).

Bronze Age burial mounds have been found near the river, and in antiquity the town of Anabura was here, there are remains in the village of Feleli and a statue of Artemis from the site is on display in the museum in Afyon. The undergrand city revealed in year 2003 shows that there was life even before B.C. 400.

In the town there are a number of classic Ottoman Empire period houses with courtyards.

Today the area is a rural district, the major production is sugar beet. In the countryside the people drive home-made vehicles (half-trailer, half pick-up truck) called pat-pat.
