= Bulca, Sinanpaşa =

Bulca
- Village
- Location within Turkey Location within Turkey Aegean
- Coordinates: 38°47′10″N 30°18′31″E
- Country: Turkey
- Province: Afyonkarahisar
- District: Sinanpaşa
- Population (2021): 942
- Time zone: UTC+3 (TRT)

Bulca is a village in the Sinanpaşa District, Afyonkarahisar Province, Turkey. Its population is 942 (2021).
