= Salar, Afyonkarahisar =

Salar
- Municipality
- Location in Turkey Salar (Turkey Aegean)
- Coordinates: 38°41′11″N 30°35′8″E
- Country: Turkey
- Province: Afyonkarahisar
- District: Afyonkarahisar
- Population (2021): 4,615
- Time zone: UTC+3 (TRT)

Salar is a town (belde) and municipality in the Afyonkarahisar District, Afyonkarahisar Province, Turkey. Its population is 4,615 (2021).
