= Değirmenayvalı =

- Municipality
- Location in Turkey Değirmenayvalı (Turkey Aegean)
- Coordinates: 38°40′26″N 30°31′53″E
- Country: Turkey
- Province: Afyonkarahisar
- District: Afyonkarahisar
- Population (2021): 2,875
- Time zone: UTC+3 (TRT)

Değirmenayvalı is a town (belde) and municipality in the Afyonkarahisar District, Afyonkarahisar Province, Turkey. Its population is 2,875 (2021).
