= Kırka, Sinanpaşa =

Kırka
- Municipality
- Location in Turkey Kırka (Turkey Aegean)
- Coordinates: 38°44′N 30°14′E
- Country: Turkey
- Province: Afyonkarahisar
- District: Sinanpaşa
- Population (2021): 1,988
- Time zone: UTC+3 (TRT)

Kırka is a town (belde) and municipality in the Sinanpaşa District, Afyonkarahisar Province, Turkey. Its population is 1,988 (2021).
