= Ahmetpaşa, Sinanpaşa =

Ahmetpaşa
- Municipality
- Location in Turkey Ahmetpaşa (Turkey Aegean)
- Coordinates: 38.7307°N 30.3126°E
- Country: Turkey
- Province: Afyonkarahisar
- District: Sinanpaşa
- Population (2021): 2,653
- Time zone: UTC+3 (TRT)

Ahmetpaşa is a town (belde) and municipality in the Sinanpaşa District, Afyonkarahisar Province, Turkey. Its population is 2,653 (2021).
