= Kılıçarslan, Sinanpaşa =

Kılıçarslan
- Municipality
- Location in Turkey Kılıçarslan (Turkey Aegean)
- Coordinates: 38°44′N 30°21′E
- Country: Turkey
- Province: Afyonkarahisar
- District: Sinanpaşa
- Population (2021): 2,636
- Time zone: UTC+3 (TRT)

Kılıçarslan is a town (belde) and municipality in the Sinanpaşa District, Afyonkarahisar Province, Turkey. Its population is 2,636 (2021).
