= Fethibey =

- Municipality
- Location in Turkey Fethibey (Turkey Aegean)
- Coordinates: 38°51′13″N 30°30′0″E
- Country: Turkey
- Province: Afyonkarahisar
- District: Afyonkarahisar
- Population (2021): 2,722
- Time zone: UTC+3 (TRT)

Fethibey is a town (belde) and municipality in the Afyonkarahisar District, Afyonkarahisar Province, Turkey. Its population is 2,722 (2021).
