= Yeşilçiftlik, Sultandağı =

Yeşilçiftlik
- Municipality
- Location in Turkey Yeşilçiftlik (Turkey Aegean)
- Coordinates: 38°33′N 31°13′E
- Country: Turkey
- Province: Afyonkarahisar
- District: Sultandağı
- Time zone: UTC+3 (TRT)

Yeşilçiftlik is a town (belde) and municipality in the Sultandağı District, Afyonkarahisar Province, Turkey. Its population is 2,104 (2021).
