= Prymnessus =

Town of ancient Phrygia

Coordinates: 38°41′53″N 30°34′11″E

Prymnessus or Prymnessos (Ancient Greek: Πρύμνησσος), or Prymnesus or Prymnesos (Πρύμνησος), or Prymnesia (Πρυμνησία) was a town of ancient Phrygia. Its site is located near Sülün in Asiatic Turkey.

== History ==
The town was inhabited during Roman and Byzantine times. It was the see of a Christian bishop. No longer the seat of a residential bishop, it remains a titular see of the Roman Catholic Church.

The martyr and saint Ariadne of Phrygia lived here according to her vita.
