= Nuribey =

- Municipality
- Location in Turkey Nuribey (Turkey Aegean)
- Coordinates: 38°40′34″N 30°37′10″E
- Country: Turkey
- Province: Afyonkarahisar
- District: Afyonkarahisar
- Population (2021): 3,076
- Time zone: UTC+3 (TRT)

Nuribey is a town (belde) and municipality in the Afyonkarahisar District, Afyonkarahisar Province, Turkey. Its population is 3,076 (2021).
