= Gebeceler =

- Municipality
- Location in Turkey Gebeceler (Turkey Aegean)
- Coordinates: 38°46′22″N 30°44′40″E
- Country: Turkey
- Province: Afyonkarahisar
- District: Afyonkarahisar
- Population (2021): 3,512
- Time zone: UTC+3 (TRT)

Gebeceler is a town (belde) and municipality in the Afyonkarahisar District, Afyonkarahisar Province, Turkey. Its population is 3,512 (2021).
