= Sultandağı =

- Municipality
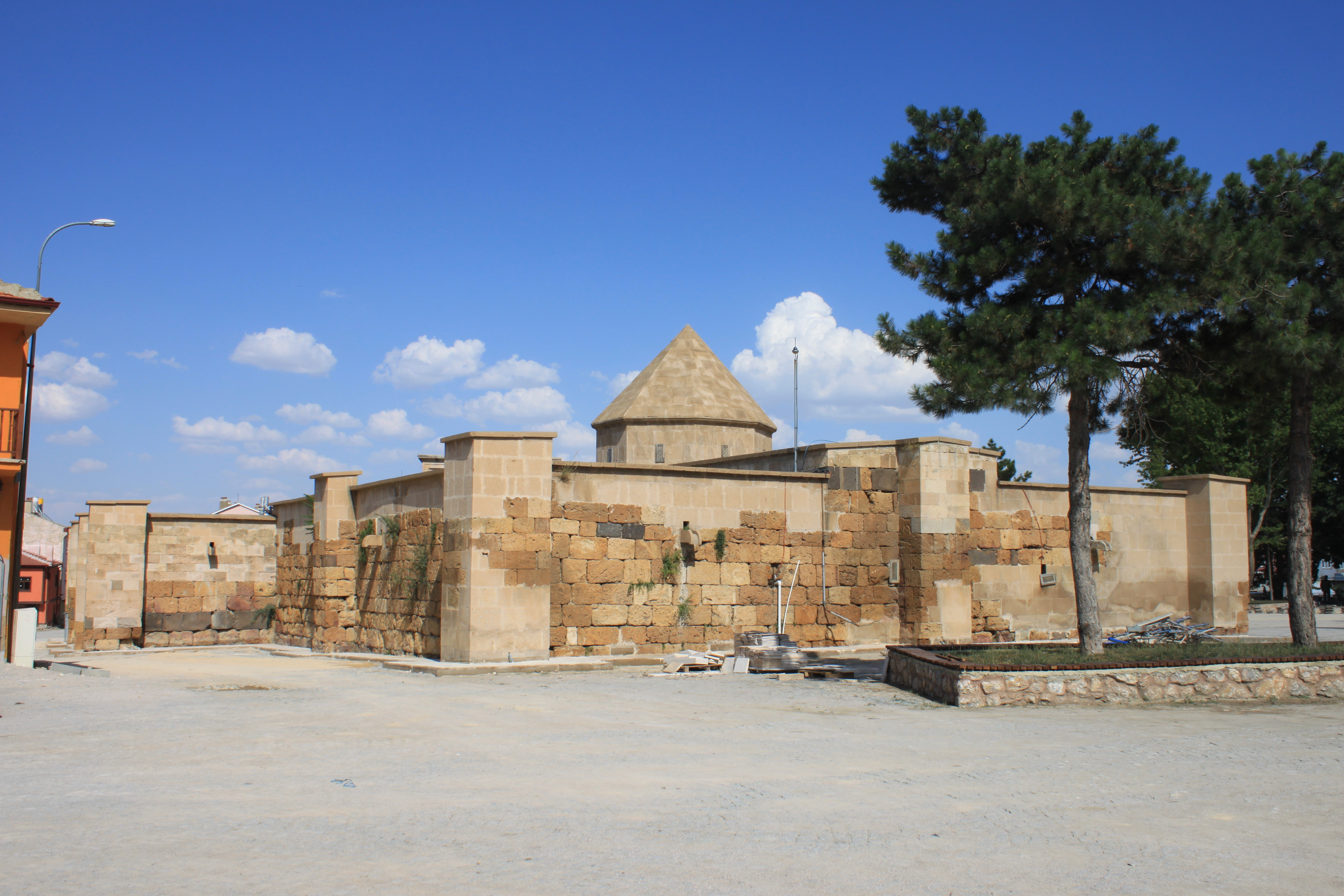
- İsaklı Han in Sultandaği

- Location within Turkey Location within Turkey Aegean
- Coordinates: 38°32′N 31°14′E
- Country: Turkey
- Province: Afyonkarahisar
- District: Sultandağı

Government
  - Mayor: Mehmet Aldırmaz (AKP)
- Population (2024): 13,779
- Time zone: UTC+3 (TRT)
- Climate: Csb
- Website: www.sultandagi.bel.tr

Sultandağı is a town of Afyonkarahisar Province in the Aegean region of Turkey. It is the seat of Sultandağı District. Sultandağı district has a total population of 13,779 according to the 2024 census. It is located at 68 km from the city of Afyon on the road to Konya, near Lake Akşehir at the foothills of the Sultan Mountains (Sultandağ), a meeting point of the Aegean and central Anatolian geographical zones. The mayor is Mehmet Aldırmaz (AKP).

== History ==
The area has been settled since antiquity but the town that stands today, formerly known as İshaklı, was founded by the Seljuk lord İshak Bey and named after him. The name Sultandağı comes from the mountains' use as a stronghold for the armies of the Seljuk sultan when fighting the Byzantines. At that time the Silk Road from the Arabian Peninsula passed through here on the way to the Aegean coast. Sultandağı is famous for cherries which is exported to over 50 countries.

Every year, "Cherry Festival" takes places in Sultandagi. In this festival, the farmers competes to exhibit their cherries to the jury. taking the "size" criteria into consideration, the jury tries to decide the owner of the biggest cherries in the related year. Usually, the first winner is awarded with gold, fuel for their tractors, etc. During the festival, famous singers performs on the stage. Some of these singers are Orhan Hakalmaz, Murat Basaran, Izzet Altinmese, Lara, Sumer Ezgu, etc.

There was a large earthquake in 2001 which caused little loss of life; it was this event which led most people to focus their attention on the town.
