= Susuz, Afyonkarahisar =

Susuz
- Municipality
- Location in Turkey Susuz (Turkey Aegean)
- Coordinates: 38°48′25″N 30°36′36″E
- Country: Turkey
- Province: Afyonkarahisar
- District: Afyonkarahisar
- Population (2021): 4,753
- Time zone: UTC+3 (TRT)
- Website: www.susuz.bel.tr

Susuz is a town (belde) and municipality in the Afyonkarahisar District, Afyonkarahisar Province, Turkey. Its population is 4,753 (2021).
