= Çayırbağ =

- Municipality
- Location in Turkey Çayırbağ (Turkey Aegean)
- Coordinates: 38°51′0″N 30°31′49″E
- Country: Turkey
- Province: Afyonkarahisar
- District: Afyonkarahisar
- Population (2021): 4,377
- Time zone: UTC+3 (TRT)
- Postal code: 03032
- Area code: 0272

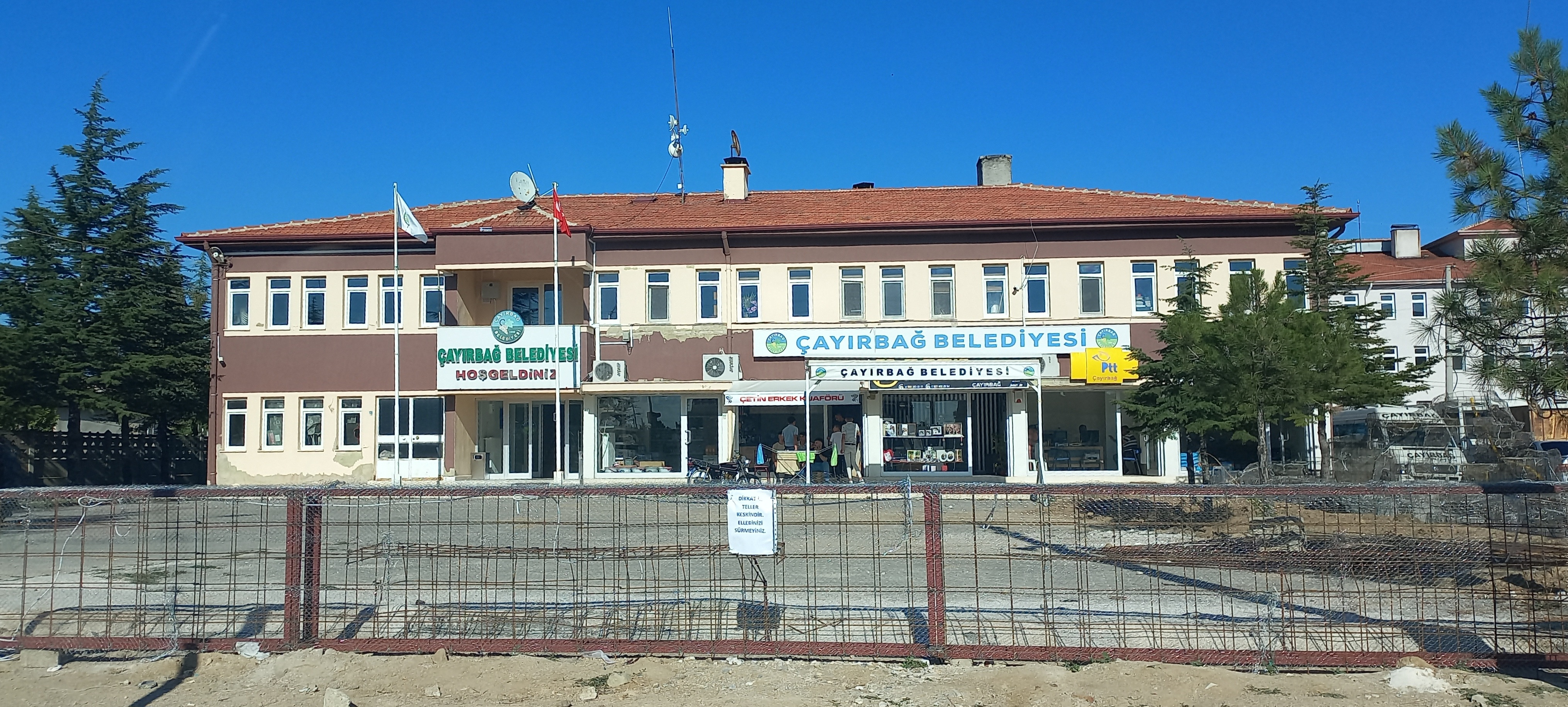
Çayırbağ Municipality Building

Çayırbağ is a town (belde) and municipality in the Afyonkarahisar District, Afyonkarahisar Province, Turkey. Its population is 4,377 (2021). The initial name of the town was Sipsin. In 1960, it was renamed to Çayırbağ. It has four neighborhoods as Fatih, Ali Çetinkaya, Uğur and Huzur. It is 7 km (4.3 mi) far from Afyonkarahisar on the Eskişehir-Afyonkarahisar highway D-665.

== History ==
The historical development of the town shows parallelism with Afyonkarahisar. The known old history of Afyonkarahisar region dates back to 30000 BC. The region joined the Ottoman Empire in 1429. From 27 March 1921 to 27 August 1922, it was occupied by the Greeks during the Greco-Turkish War (1919–1922).

== Economy ==
The economy of Çayırbağ is based mainly on agricultur and animal husbandary. Gherkin, which is grown for pickling, has an important place in agriculture. In addition, the other income of the town is the workers, who go to Afyonkarahisar Center daily and return. The fact that the town is close to Afyonkarahisar creates negativities in terms of economic and social development.
