= Afyonkarahisar District =

- District
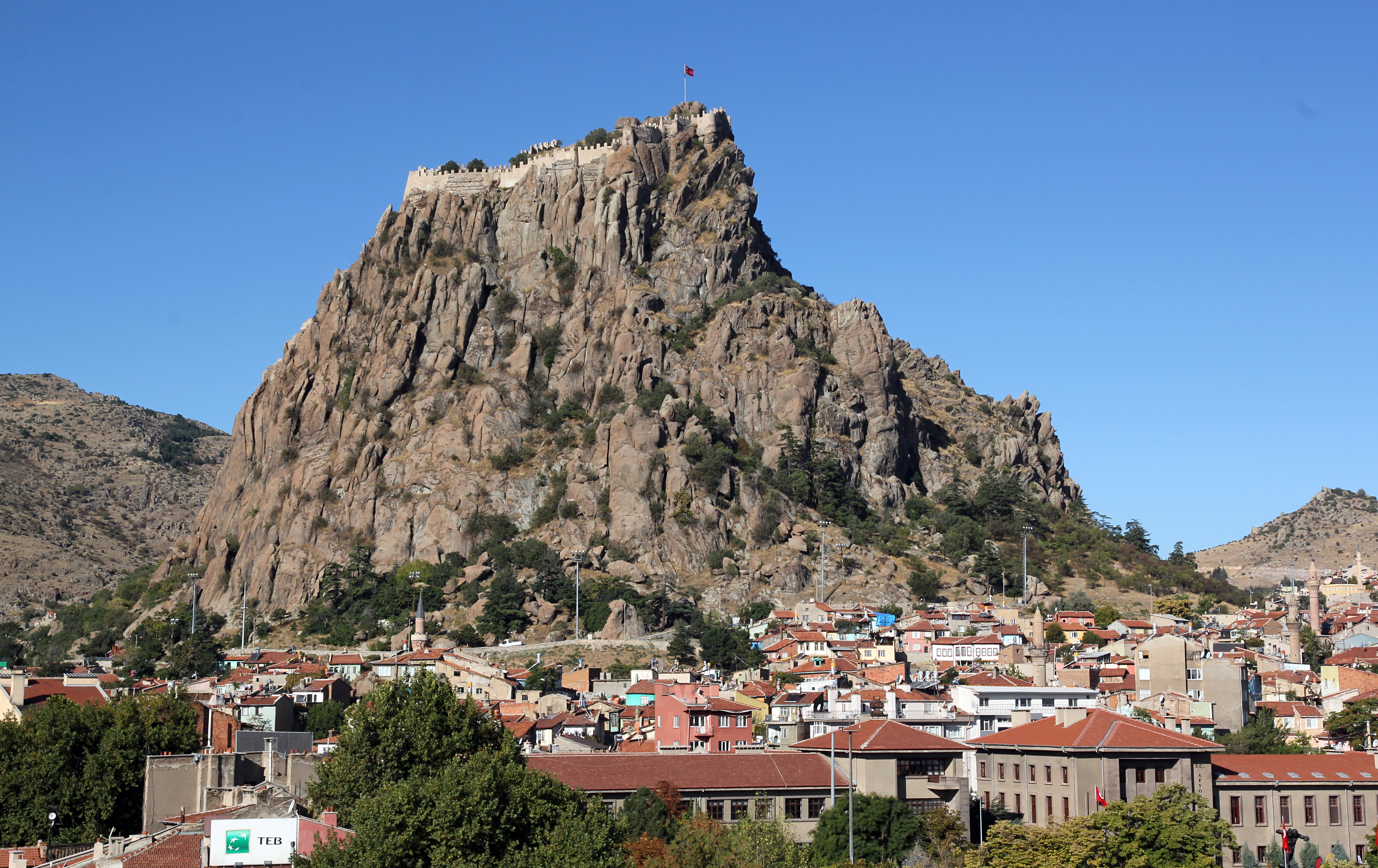
- Afyonkarahisar Castle overlooking the city of Afyonkarahisar

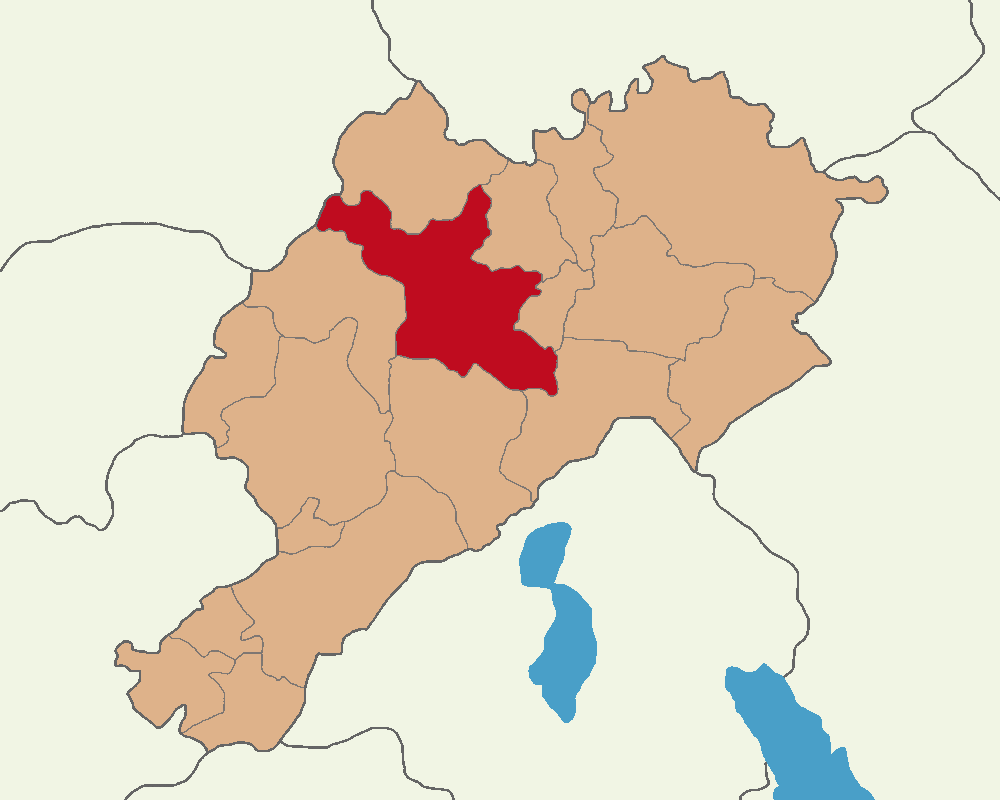
- Afyonkarahisar district within Afyonkarahisar Province

- Location within Turkey Location within Turkey Aegean
- Coordinates: 38°45′N 30°32′E
- Country: Turkey
- Province: Afyonkarahisar
- Seat: Afyonkarahisar
- Area: 1,261 km^{2} (487 sq mi)
- Population (2021): 319,574
  - Density: 253.4/km^{2} (656.4/sq mi)
- Time zone: UTC+3 (TRT)

Afyonkarahisar District (also known as Merkez 'central') is a district in the Afyonkarahisar Province of Turkey. Its seat is the city Afyonkarahisar. Its occupied an area of 1,261 km^{2} (487 sq mi), and had a population of 319,574 in 2021.

== Etymology ==
Afyonkarahisar means "opium black castle" in Turkish. It was named as "Karahisar" meaning black castle ("kara" meaning black and "hisar" meaning castle) in the 13th century CE after the castle overlooking the town. The prefix "afyon" meaning opium was added to the name in 1923 because of the opium production in the region. It is also mentioned by the name Merkez meaning "central" in Turkish.

== History ==
=== Early years ===
Human civilization has begun in the Early Bronze Age about 5000 years ago in the region. In 1800 BCE, Hittites occupied the region until the Phrygians populated it from 12th to 6th century BCE. The Hittites built a primitive fort atop the 220 m (720 ft) high granite rock overlooking the town of Afyonkarahisar (then known as Hapanuwa). In 333 BCE, Alexander the Great captured the region, and named the region as Akroinon or Akronium. The name was subsequently used by the Macedonians, Selucids, and the Roman Empire, which ruled over the region.

=== Middle ages ===
Akroinοn became an important fortress in the Armeniakon theme during the Byzantine rule due to its strategic location. It finds mention in the Byzantine history when it was attacked in 716 and 732 CE by Arabs invaders. After Byzantine emperor Leo III won a decisive victory over an Umayyad Caliphate in the Battle of Akroinon in 740 CE, the town was renamed as Nicopolis or city of Nicholas.(Greek for "city of victory"). Since the 10th century, it was also a bishopric of Phrygia Salutaris. In the 11th century CE, the region became part of the frontier zone between the Byzantine Empire and the invading Turks.

The region was lost by the Byzantines to the Seljuk Turks from the Sultanate of Rum when Manuel I Komnenos captured the region in the middle of 12th century CE. The Seljuks renamed the castle as "Kara Hisar". When the town was occupied by the Sâhib Ata in the 13th century CE, the region was called as Sahip Kara Hisar in honour of him. The region had been in the middle of battles for much of the Crusades, and was finally conquered by the Ottomans under Beyazid I in 1392 CE. The Ottomans lost it after the invasion of Timur Lenk in 1402 CE, but recaptured it in 1428-29 CE.

=== Later years ===
Under the Ottoman empire, the region was situated on the major trade route linking Smyrna and Western Asia. It thrived as a major centre of opium production, and Afyon became a wealthy city. In 1902, a fire burning for 32 hours destroyed parts of the city. The region was a major producer of raw opium until the late 1960s, when the production was controlled and a ban was enforced except licensed production for pharmaceutical purposes. The name was officially changed to Afyonkarahisar in 2004.

== Geography ==
Afyonkarahisar district is one of the 18 districts in the Afyonkarahisar Province of Turkey. Its occupied an area of 1,261 km^{2} (487 sq mi), and had a population of 319,574 in 2021. The region is home to many thermal springs, which were used by human since the Bronze Age. The Romans constructed various marble baths using the springs, and large social complexes were built around these during the Ottoman era. The waters of the springs have a temperature range of 46–71 °C (115–160 °F) and contain various mineral salts such as sodium chloride, and sodium bicarbonate.

== Sub-divisions ==
There are 15 municipalities in Afyonkarahisar district including the city and capital of Afyonkarahisar:

- Afyonkarahisar
- Beyyazı
- Çayırbağ
- Çıkrık
- Değirmenayvalı
- Erkmen
- Fethibey
- Gebeceler
- Işıklar
- Kocatepe
- Nuribey
- Salar
- Susuz
- Sülümenli
- Sülün

There are 22 villages in the district:

- Alcalı
- Anıtkaya
- Bayramgazi
- Belkaracaören
- Bostanlı
- Burhaniye
- Çavdarlı
- Değirmendere
- Gözsüzlü
- Halımoru
- Kaplanlı
- Karaarslan
- Kızıldağ
- Kozluca
- Köprülü
- Küçükkalecik
- Olucak
- Omuzca
- Saadet
- Saraydüzü
- Sarık
- Yarımca
