= Sinanpaşa =

- Municipality
- Location within Turkey Location within Turkey Aegean
- Coordinates: 38°45′N 30°15′E
- Country: Turkey
- Province: Afyonkarahisar
- District: Sinanpaşa

Government
  - Mayor: Erdal Karaman (AKP)
- Population (2025): 3,609
- Time zone: UTC+3 (TRT)
- Climate: Csb
- Website: www.sinanpasa.bel.tr

Sinanpaşa (or Sincanlı) is a town of Afyonkarahisar Province, Turkey on a plain surrounded by pine-covered mountains, 33 km from the city of Afyon on the road to Uşak and İzmir. It is the seat of Sinanpaşa District. Sinanpaşa district has a total population of 38,428 according to the 2024 census, while the town has a population of 3,609 people. The mayor is Erdal Karaman (AKP).

Winters are cold and snowy, and summers are dry and hot.

== History ==
The area has been a crossroads since antiquity, with archaeological evidence indicating habitation since 4000 BC. Surface excavations in the village of Küçükhöyük go back to 3000 BC.

The name Sinan Paşa comes from the son of a lord of the Akkoyunlu Turks who in 1473 took refuge with Ottoman Sultan Mehmet II during the war between the Akkoyunlu and the warrior Uzun Hasan (the Otlukbeli War). Later in the Ottoman period the important general Hersekzade Ahmet Paşa settled here in the village still known as Ahmet Paşa today.

The town was occupied by Greek forces during the Turkish War of Independence, but was recovered during the great Turkish counter-attack in 1922.

== Sinanpaşa today ==
Nowadays Sinanpaşa is a country town providing schools, hospital and other infrastructure to the surrounding countryside, where poppy seeds, wheat and other grains are grown.
