= Kocatepe, Afyonkarahisar =

Kocatepe
- Municipality
- Location in Turkey Kocatepe (Turkey Aegean)
- Coordinates: 38°41′20″N 30°30′0″E
- Country: Turkey
- Province: Afyonkarahisar
- District: Afyonkarahisar
- Population (2021): 3,156
- Time zone: UTC+3 (TRT)

Kocatepe is a town (belde) and municipality in the Afyonkarahisar District, Afyonkarahisar Province, Turkey. Its population is 3,156 (2021).
