= Erkmen, Afyonkarahisar =

Erkmen
- Municipality
- Location in Turkey Erkmen (Turkey Aegean)
- Coordinates: 38°45′35″N 30°28′59″E
- Country: Turkey
- Province: Afyonkarahisar
- District: Afyonkarahisar
- Population (2021): 7,293
- Time zone: UTC+3 (TRT)

Erkmen is a town (belde) and municipality in the Afyonkarahisar District, Afyonkarahisar Province, Turkey. Its population is 7,293 (2021).
