= Lake Akşehir =

Lake in Turkey

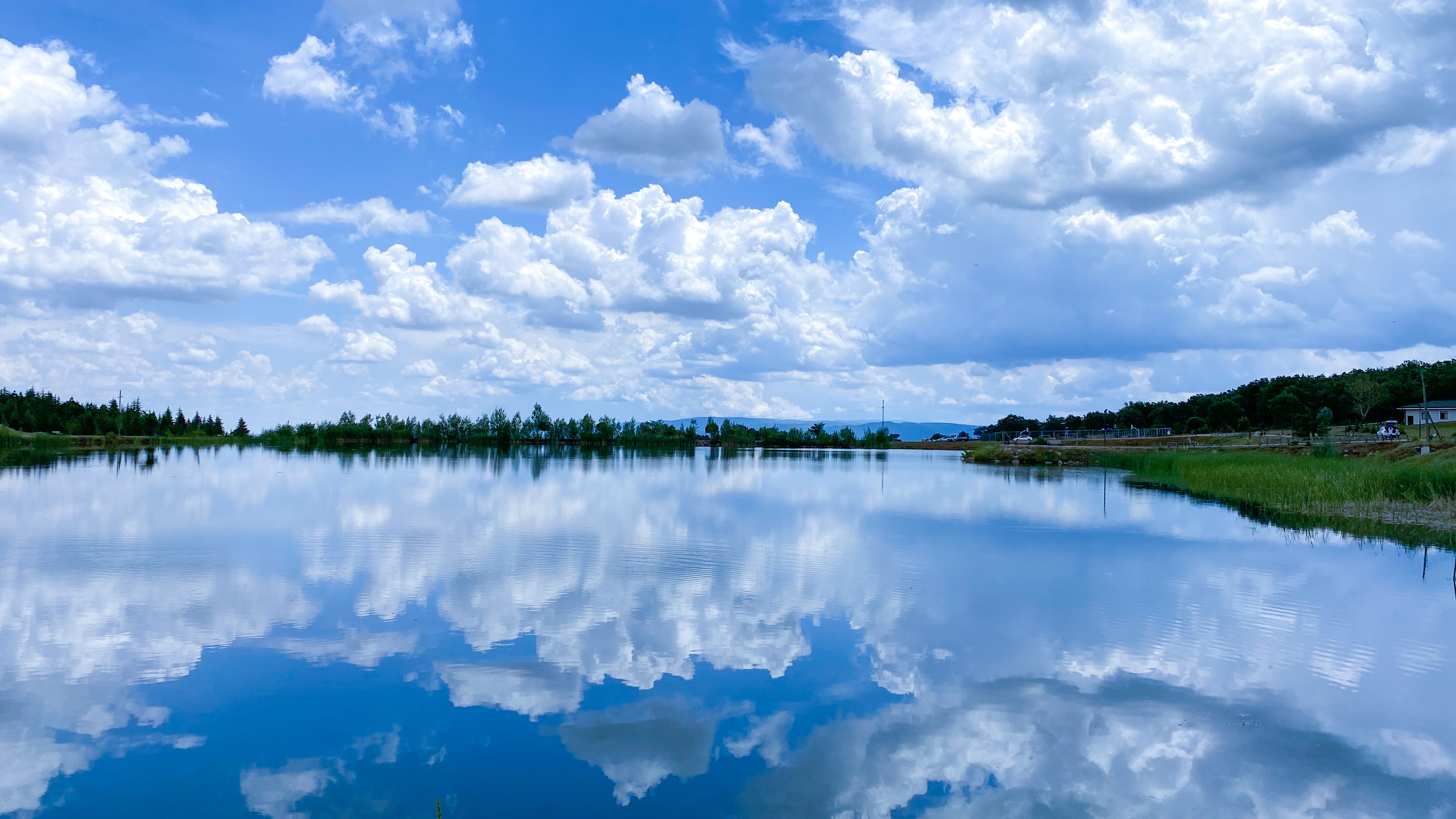

- Location within Turkey
- Coordinates: 38°36′0″N 31°18′0″E
- Basin countries: Turkey
- Surface area: 350 km^{2} (140 sq mi)
- Max. depth: 7 m (23 ft)

Lake Akşehir (Turkish: Akşehir Gölü) is a tectonic freshwater endorheic lake in Afyonkarahisar and Konya provinces, in the southwestern part of Turkey. It carries the same name as the town of Akşehir south of the lake.

The lake is fed by the Eber Channel, five larger streams from the Sultan Mountains, and many smaller streams. The lake's salinity increases towards the middle and northern parts due to underground spring waters. The lake is used for irrigation.

== Important Bird Area ==
The lake, which is in unprotected status, was declared by BirdLife International as an Important Bird Area in 1989 for its waterfowl species, which are threatened globally as well as on site by hunting, reed cutting in the breeding season and pollution.
