= Işıklar =

- Municipality
- Location within Turkey Location within Turkey Aegean
- Coordinates: 38°40′N 30°44′E
- Country: Turkey
- Province: Afyonkarahisar
- District: Afyonkarahisar
- Elevation: 1,030 m (3,380 ft)
- Population (2021): 7,427
- Time zone: UTC+3 (TRT)
- Postal code: 03080
- Area code: 0272
- Licence plate: 03

Işıklar (literally "lights") is a town (belde) and municipality in the Afyonkarahisar District, Afyonkarahisar Province, Turkey. Its population is 7,427 (2021). It is situated on Turkish state highway D.300 close to the Sugar refinery of Afyon. The distance to Afyon is 18 kilometres (11 mi).

Before the advance of motor vehicles, Işıklar was a stop in caravan routes and the name of the settlement may refer to its fire lights in that period.
