= Beyyazı =

- Municipality
- Location in Turkey Beyyazı (Turkey Aegean)
- Coordinates: 38°50′1″N 30°35′23″E
- Country: Turkey
- Province: Afyonkarahisar
- District: Afyonkarahisar
- Population (2021): 3,276
- Time zone: UTC+3 (TRT)

Beyyazı is a town (belde) and municipality in the Afyonkarahisar District, Afyonkarahisar Province, Turkey. Its population is 3,276 (2021).
