= Sülün =

- Municipality
- Location in Turkey Sülün (Turkey Aegean)
- Coordinates: 38°42′N 30°34′E
- Country: Turkey
- Province: Afyonkarahisar
- District: Afyonkarahisar
- Population (2021): 2,939
- Time zone: UTC+3 (TRT)

Sülün is a town (belde) and municipality in the Afyonkarahisar District, Afyonkarahisar Province, Turkey. Its population is 2,939 (2021). It was the site of the ancient city of Prymnessos.

Historical population
| Year | Pop. | ±% p.a. |
|---|---|---|
| 1997 | 2,173 | — |
| 2000 | 2,317 | +2.16% |
| 2021 | 2,939 | +1.14% |
