= Sultan Mountains =

Mountain range in Turkey

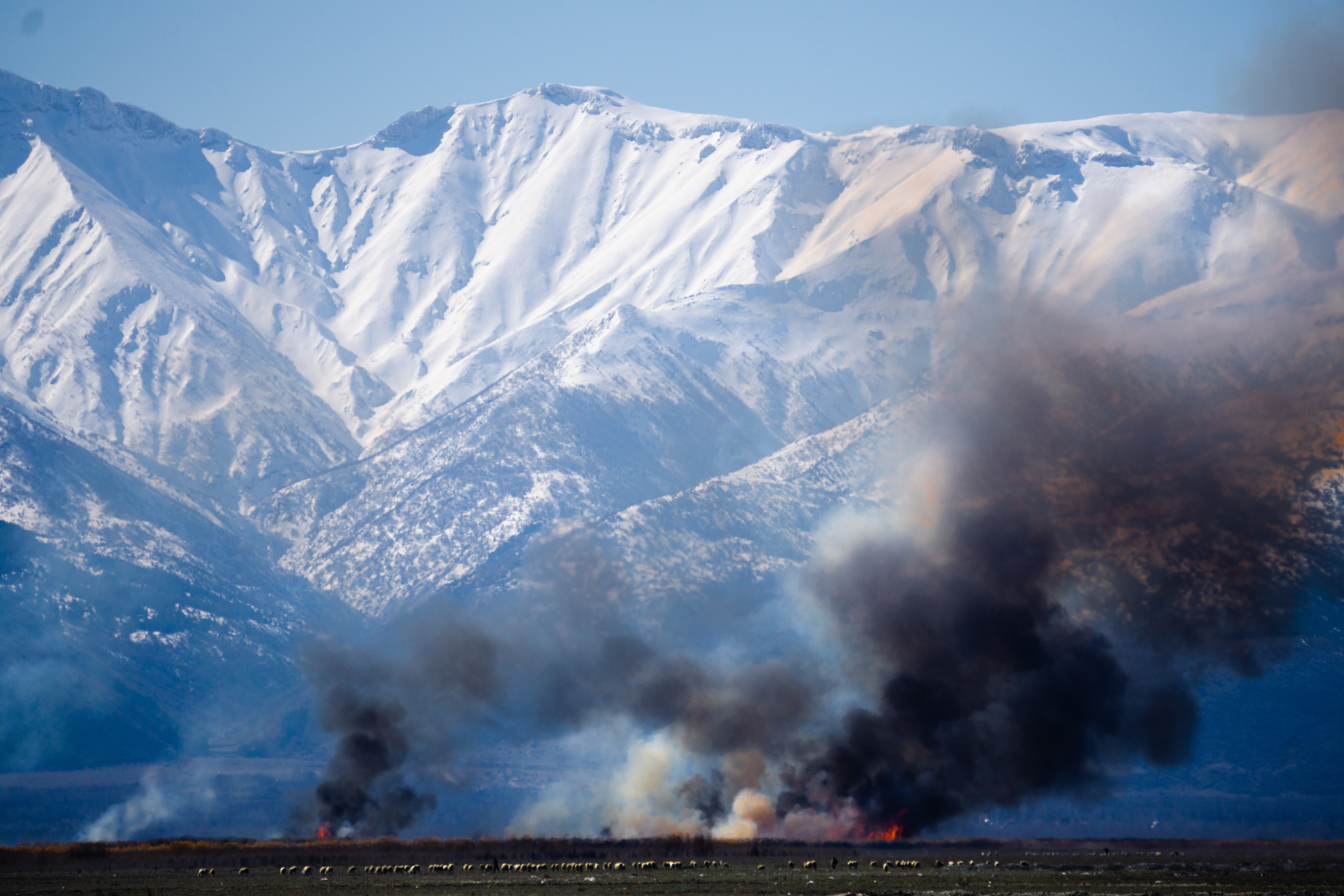
Sultan Mountains

The Sultan Mountains (Turkish: Sultan Dağları), also known as Sultan Dagh range or Sultan Dag, is a short mountain range on the western edge of the Anatolian Plateau, Turkey with highest elevation of 1,980 m (6,500 ft).

The town of Sultandağı is their namesake.

They are made up of metamorphic rocks dating from the Lower Cambrian to the Carboniferous period.

West slopes of Sultan Mountains are part of the Lake Beyşehir drainage basin.
