= Afyonkarahisar Province =

Province of Turkey

Coordinates: 38°39′06″N 30°40′12″E

Afyonkarahisar Province Afyonkarahisar ili (Turkish)
- Province
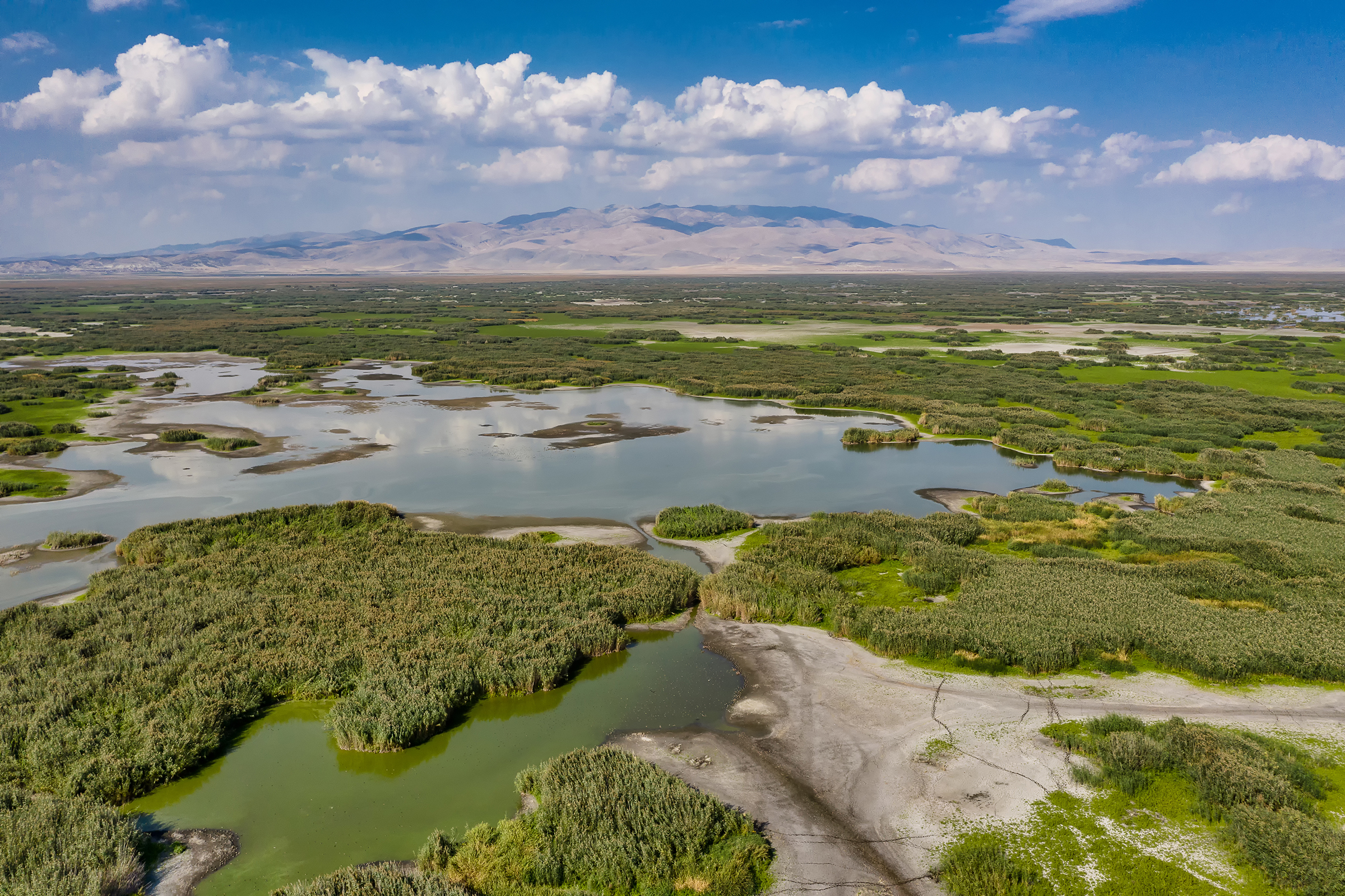
- Aerial view of Lake Eber

- Location of the province within Turkey
- Country: Turkey
- Seat: Afyonkarahisar

Government
  - Governor: Naci Aktaş
- Area: 14,016 km^{2} (5,412 sq mi)
- Population (2022): 747,555
  - Density: 53.336/km^{2} (138.14/sq mi)
- Time zone: UTC+3 (TRT)
- Area code: 0272
- Website: www.afyonkarahisar.gov.tr

Afyonkarahisar Province (Turkish: Afyonkarahisar ili), often shortened to Afyon Province, is a province in western Turkey. Its area is 14,016 km^{2}, and its population is 747,555 (2022). The provincial capital is Afyonkarahisar.

Adjacent provinces are Kütahya to the northwest, Uşak to the west, Denizli to the southwest, Burdur to the south, Isparta to the southeast, Konya to the east, and Eskişehir to the north.

== Districts ==
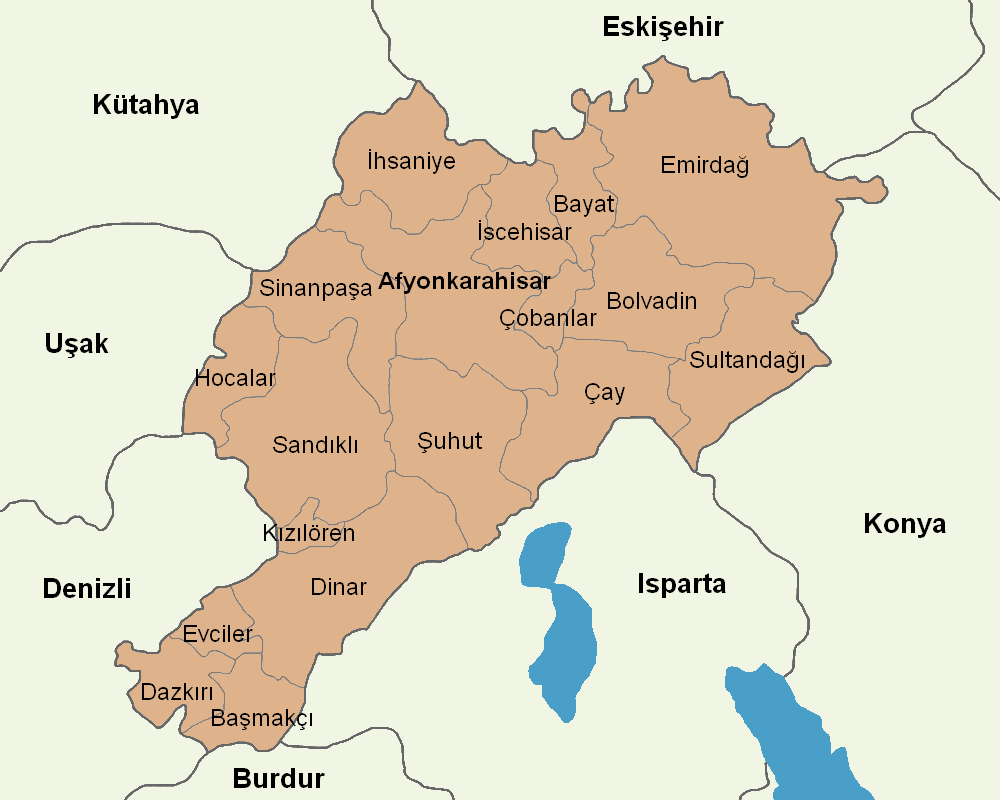
Districts of the Afyonkarahisar Province

Afyonkarahisar province is divided into 18 districts:

- Afyonkarahisar
- Başmakçı
- Bayat
- Bolvadin
- Çay
- Çobanlar
- Dazkırı
- Dinar
- Emirdağ
- Evciler
- Hocalar
- İhsaniye
- İscehisar
- Kızılören
- Sandıklı
- Sinanpaşa
- Sultandağı
- Şuhut

== Population ==
Historical population
Year	Pop.	±% p.a.
1927	120,398	—
1935	229,248	+8.38%
1940	316,034	+6.63%
1950	372,273	+1.65%
1960	459,115	+2.12%
1970	542,111	+1.68%
1980	597,516	+0.98%
1990	739,223	+2.15%
2000	812,416	+0.95%
2010	697,559	−1.51%
2020	736,912	+0.55%
Source:Turkstat

The population of Afyonkarahisar Province is majority Turkish and Muslim of the Sunni sect.

== Health ==
Air pollution is a chronic problem in the province.

== Gallery ==
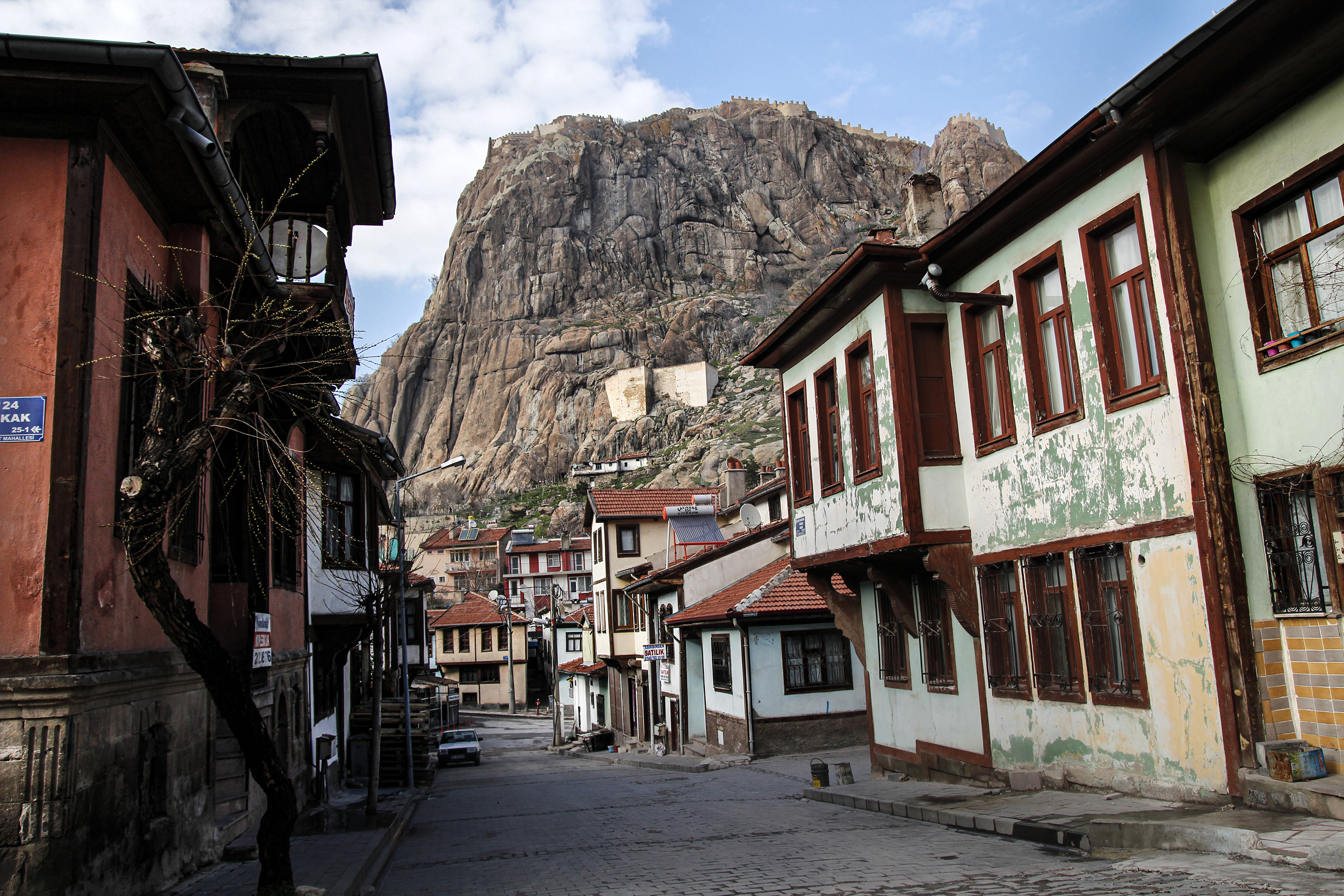
Afyonkarahisar Castle

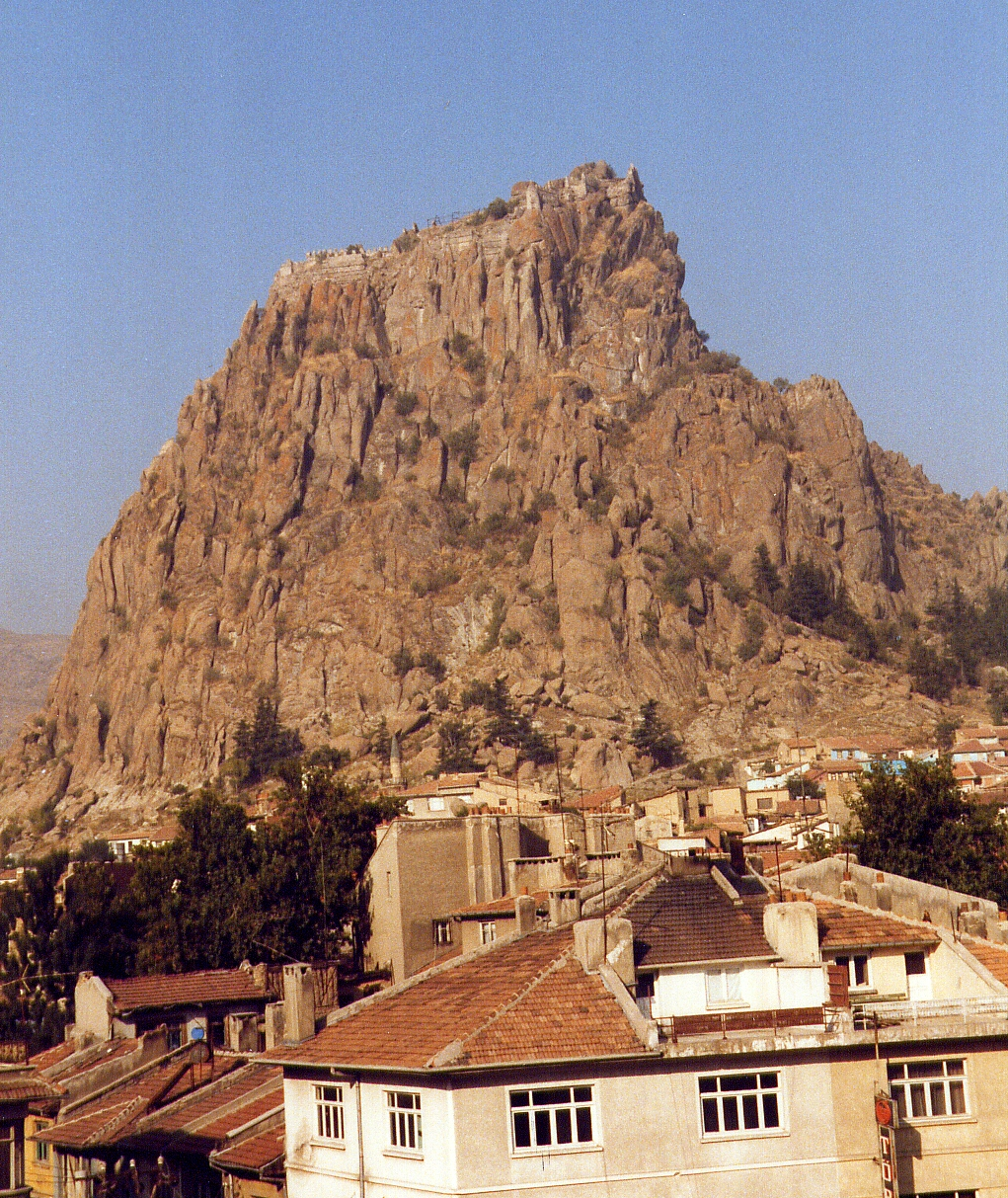
Afyonkarahisar castle hill

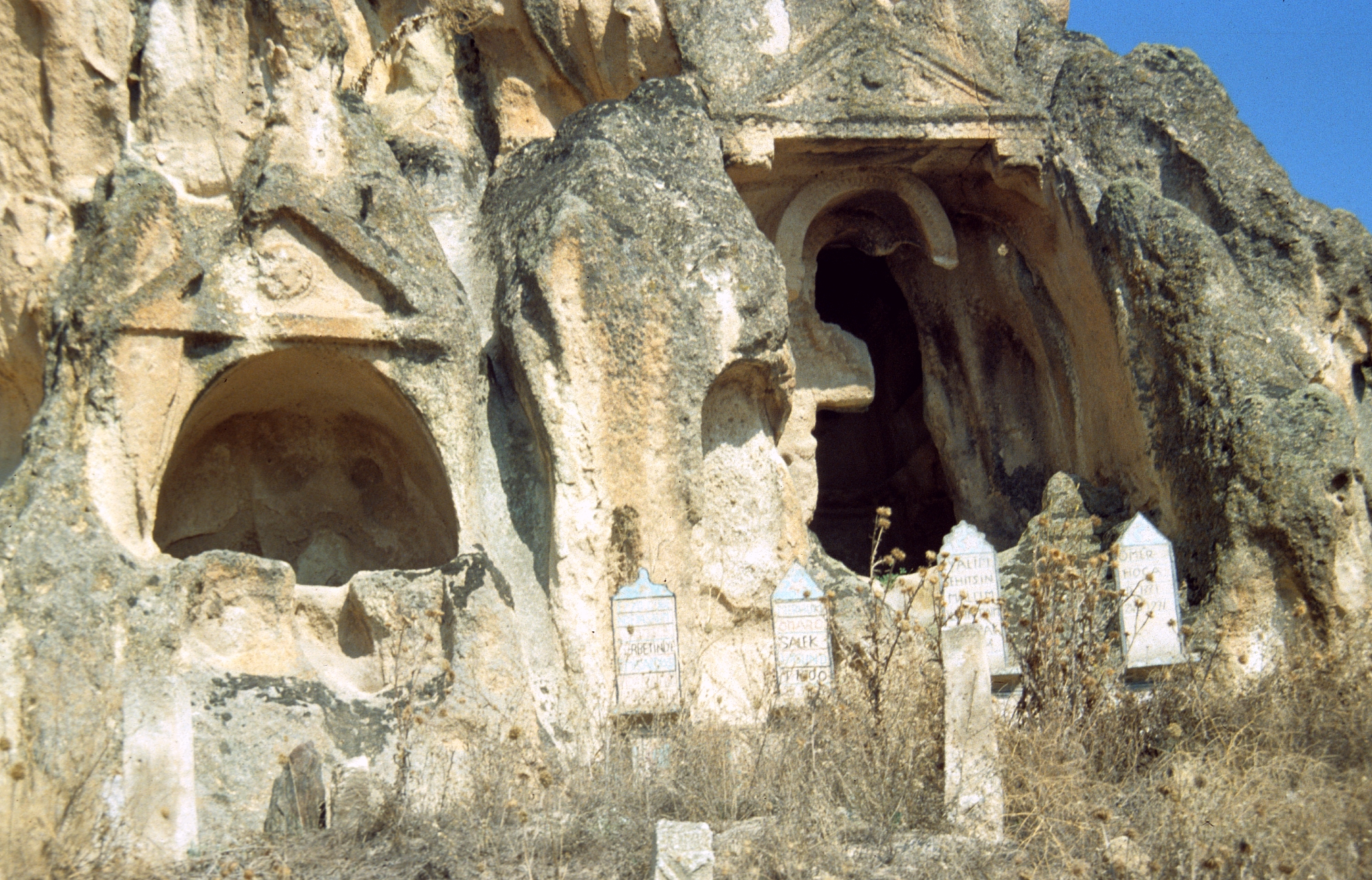
Rock tombs in the village of Ayazin

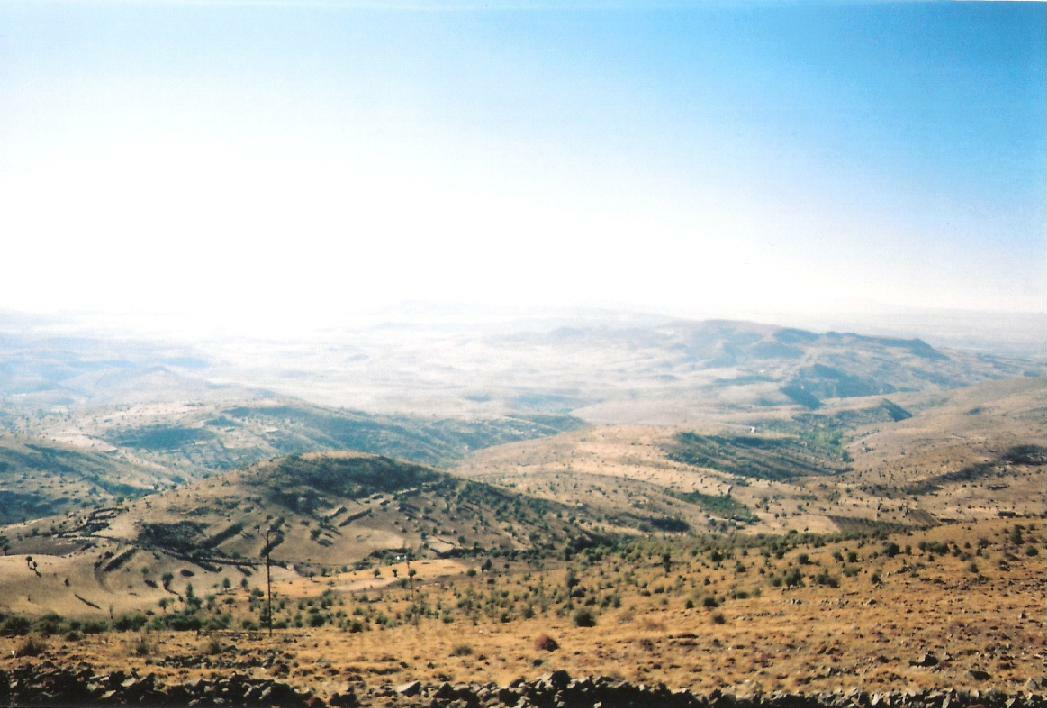
Countryside from Kocatepe hill
