= Afyonkarahisar Castle =

Castle in Afyonkarahisar, Turkey

- Afyonkarahisar, Turkey
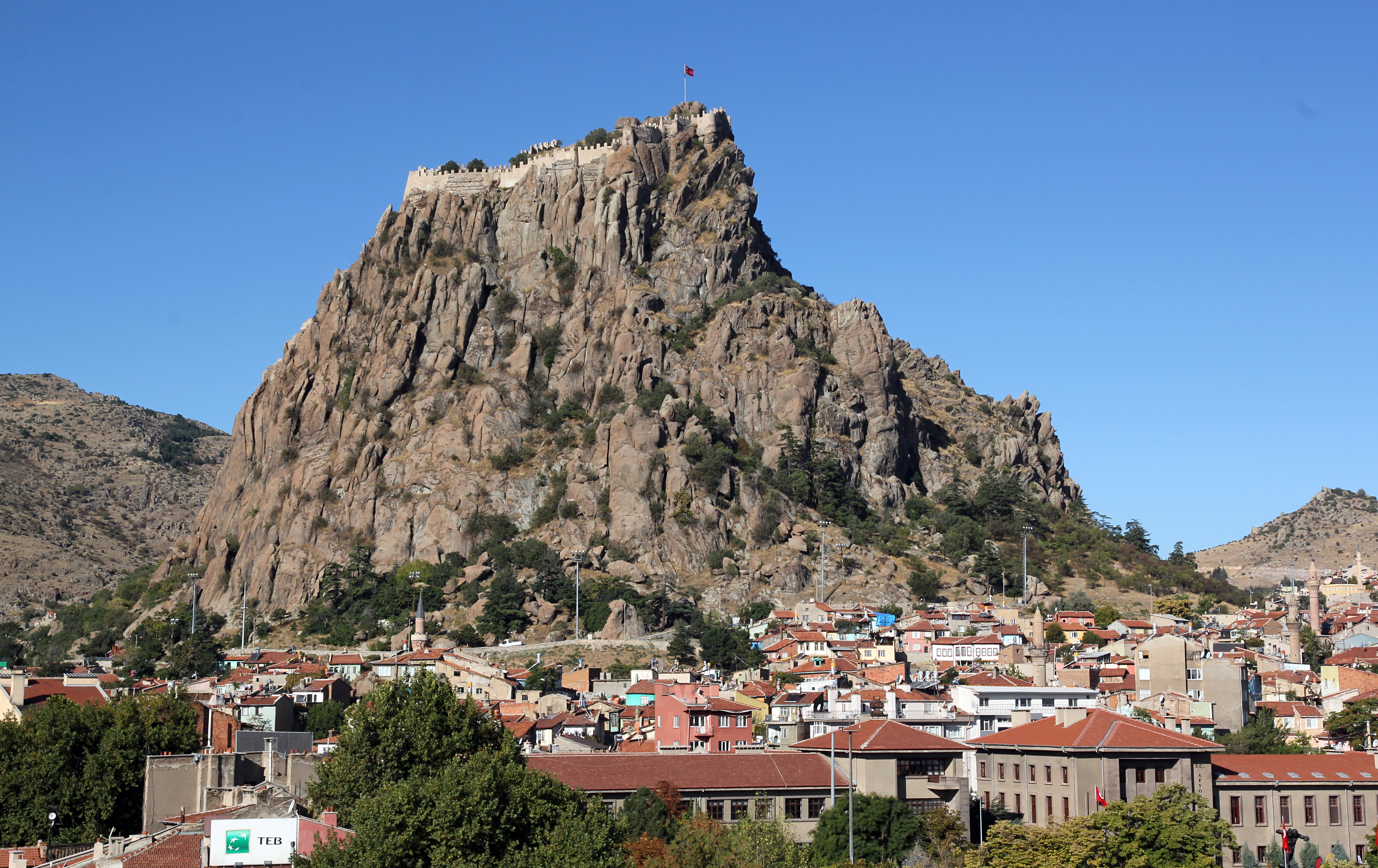
- The castle in 2019

Site information
- Type: Castle
- Owner: Hittite (c. 1350 BC)

Location
- Coordinates: 38.76526°N 30.53801°E

Site history
- Built: c. 1350 BC
- In use: c. 1350 BC

Afyonkarahisar Castle (Turkish: Afyonkarahisar Kalesi), previously Karahisar (lit. black fortress) is a castle which was built around 1350 BC and is located in Afyonkarahisar, Turkey. While Afyonkarahisar Castle (Literally: "Black Castle of Opium") refers specifically to the defensive fortification, Afyonkarahisar refers to the town containing the structure, and was renamed from Karahisar to Afyonkarahisar in 2004.

== History ==
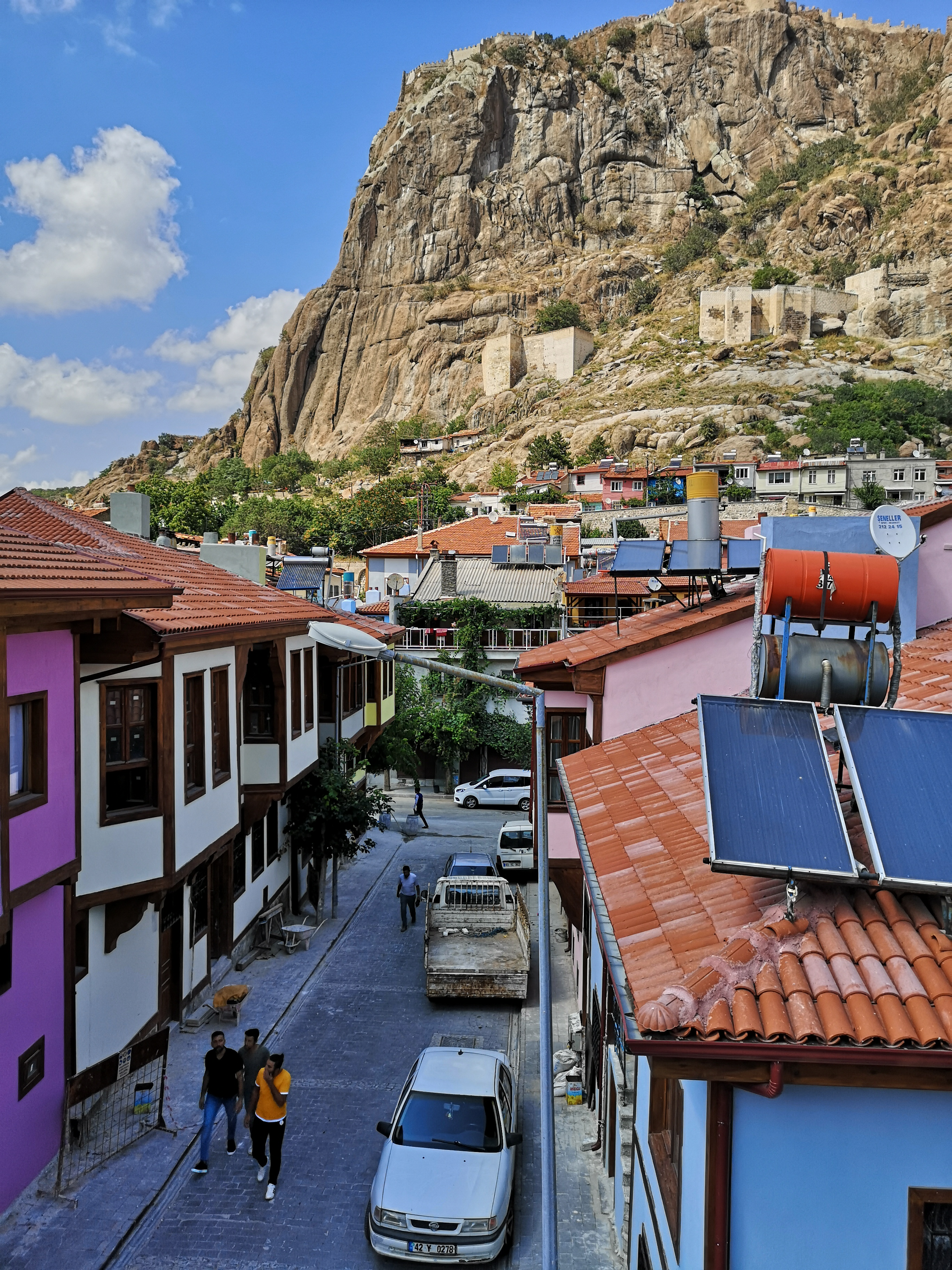
Historical houses built on the slopes of the hill near Afyonkarahisar Castle

=== Late Bronze ===
The Hittite king Mursili II built the castle on the summit of a 226 meter high hill (from ground level) overlooking the modern town of Afyonkarahisar, due to its value as a defensive fortification. It has been passed through several entities, such as Phrygians, Lydians, and the Achaemenid Empire.

=== Medieval ===
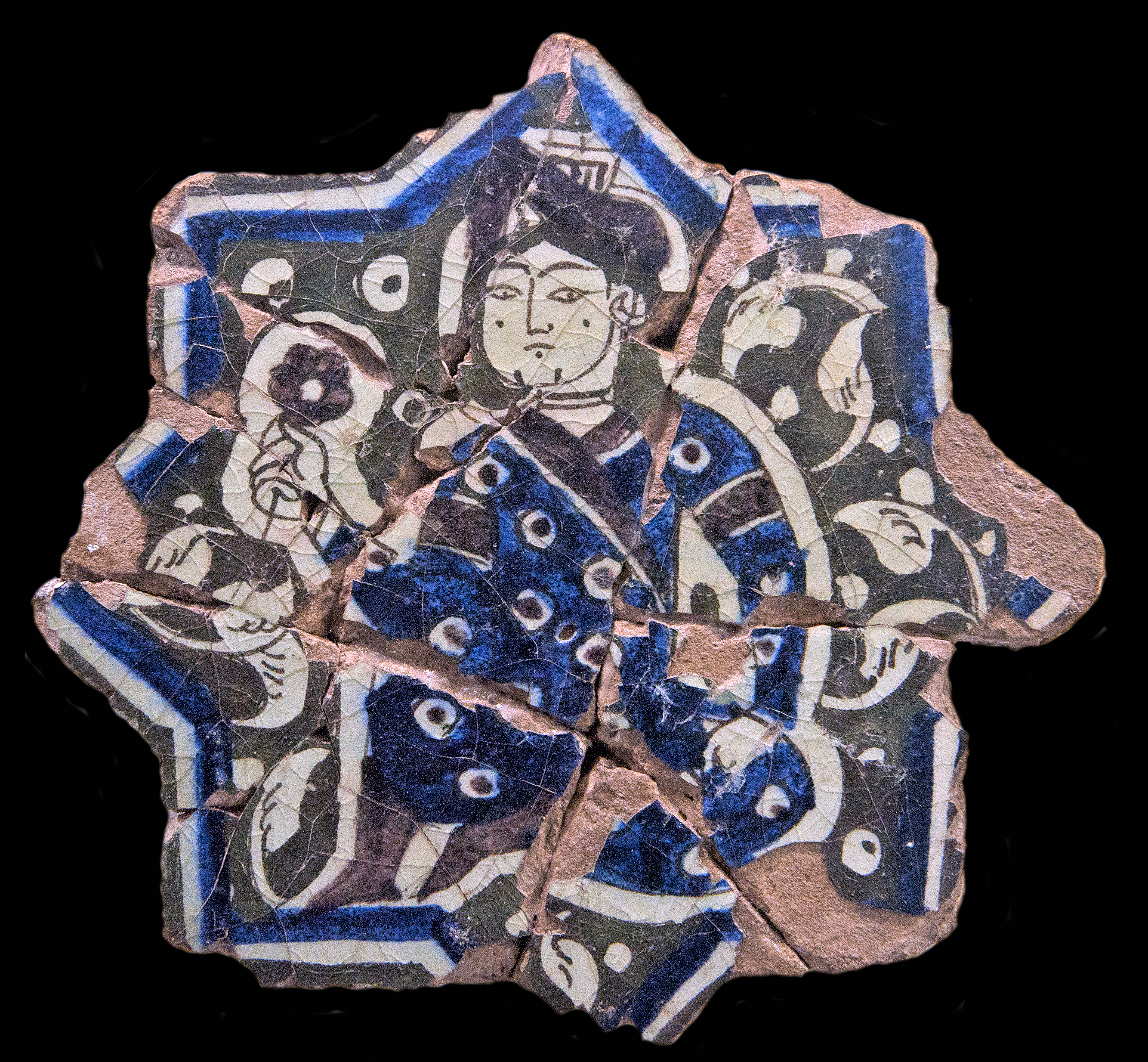
Sultan Alaeddin Kaykubad I

After the Seljuks gained control of the region in 1071, the fortress was called Kara Hisar, ("Black Fortress" in Turkish). An inscription at the castle names Alā ad-Dīn Kayqubād as Al-sultan al-mu'azzam (lit. "the Great Sultan") and Ala' al-Dunya wa'l-Din (lit. "Exaltation of the World and Religion"). Although It bears no date, so it can only be tied to his reign. Later it was fought over repeatedly during the Crusades, and the Ottomans annexed it in 1392. Timur seized it briefly in 1402 until it was again seized by Ottomans by 1428.

=== Later ===
Since the construction of the original, the castle has been rebuilt several times by various rulers. In 2004 Kara Hisar was subsequently named after the town which came to be called Afyon (lit. opium) because of the large amount of opium produced in the surrounding area.
