= Bülent İplikçioğlu =

Turkish historian and epigrapher

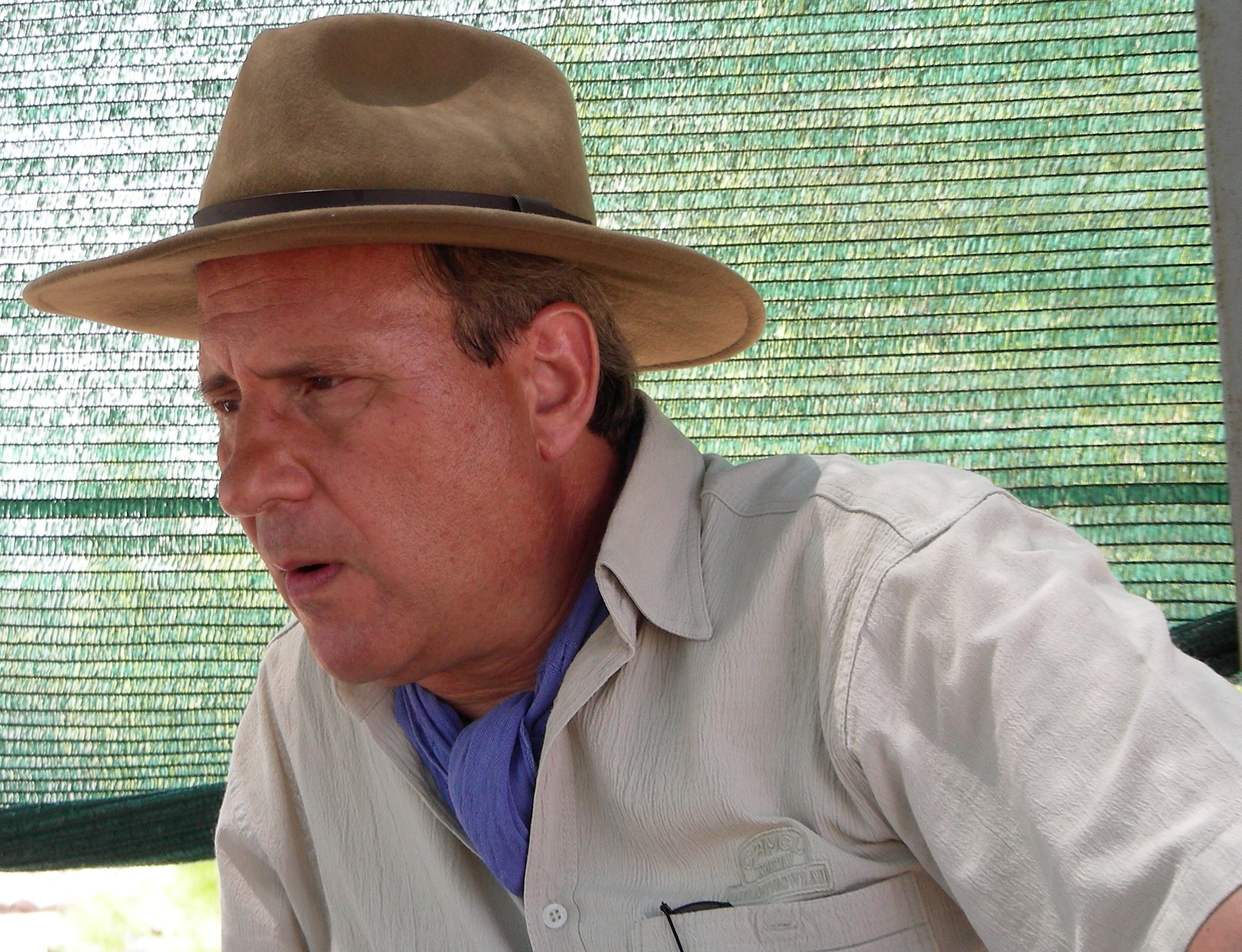
- Bülent İplikçioğlu, Rhodiapolis, 2009
- Born: 1952 (age 73–74); Afyonkarahisar, Turkey
- Citizenship: Turkey
- Education: Ankara University; University of Vienna
- Scientific career
- Fields: Ancient History and epigraphy
- Workplaces: Ankara University; University of Vienna; Marmara University

Bülent İplikçioğlu (born 1952 Afyonkarahisar, Turkey), is Turkish historian, epigrapher and professor of ancient history at the Marmara University in Istanbul.

İplikçioğlu studied History, Ancient History, Classics and Archaeology at the universities of Ankara and Vienna in the years 1970–1982. In Vienna, he received his PhD with a thesis on “Die Repräsentanten des senatorischen Reichsdienstes in Asia bis Diokletian im Spiegel der ephesischen Inschriften” in 1982. Until 1984, he was a university assistant to the Chair of Ancient History at the University of Ankara, from 1984 to 1986 an assistant professor in the Department of Ancient History at the Marmara University in Istanbul, where he became an associate professor in 1986 and professor of Ancient History in 1992.

İplikçioğlu is mainly interested in the history and epigraphy of ancient Asia Minor. From 1976 to 1991, he participated as an epigrapher in the excavations of the Austrian Archaeological Institute in Ephesus, and conducts his own epigraphic projects in the southwest of Turkey (Lycia and Pamphylia) on behalf of the Austrian Academy of Sciences since 1989.

He is a member of the German and Austrian Archaeological Institutes. Since 1984, İplikçioğlu is the head of the Department of Ancient History at the Marmara University, and holds lectures and seminars on Greco-Roman Antiquity, History of Asia Minor in the Hellenistic-Roman Period, Greek Epigraphy of Asia Minor and Methodology of Ancient History as well as cares of master's and doctoral theses.

== Primary works ==
- Die Repräsentanten des senatorischen Reichsdienstes in Asia bis Diokletian im Spiegel der ephesischen Inschriften (in German). Wien: VWGÖ. 1983. ISBN 9783853695418.
- Knibbe, Dieter; İplikçioğlu, Bülent (1984). Ephesos im Spiegel seiner Inschriften (in German). Wien: Schindler. ISBN 978-3900532000.
- Epigraphische Forschungen in Termessos und seinem Territorium I (in German). Wien: Österreichische Akademie der Wissenschaften. 1991. ISBN 978-3-7001-1876-3.
- Epigraphische Forschungen in Termessos und seinem Territorium II (in German). Wien: Österreichische Akademie der Wissenschaften. 1992. ISBN 9783700119517.
- Neue Inschriften aus Nord-Lykien I (in German). Wien: Österreichische Akademie der Wissenschaften. 1992. ISBN 9783700119500.
- Der Ritterstand und seine Tätigkeit im kaiserlichen Reichsdienst in Asia bis auf Diokletian im Spiegel der ephesischen Inschriften (in German). Ankara: TTK. 1993. ISBN 9751605563.
- Epigraphische Forschungen in Termessos und seinem Territorium III (in German). Wien: Österreichische Akademie der Wissenschaften. 1994. ISBN 9783700121329.
- Eskibatı Tarihi I: Giriş, Kaynaklar, Bibliyografya (in Turkish). Ankara: TTK. 1997. ISBN 978-9751608581.
- Hellen ve Roma Tarihinin Anahatları (in Turkish). İstanbul: Arkeoloji ve Sanat. 2007. ISBN 9789944750233.
- Epigraphische Forschungen in Termessos und seinem Territorium IV (in German). Wien: Österreichische Akademie der Wissenschaften. 2007. ISBN 978-3-7001-3532-6.
