= Victory Museum =

- Zafer Müzesi
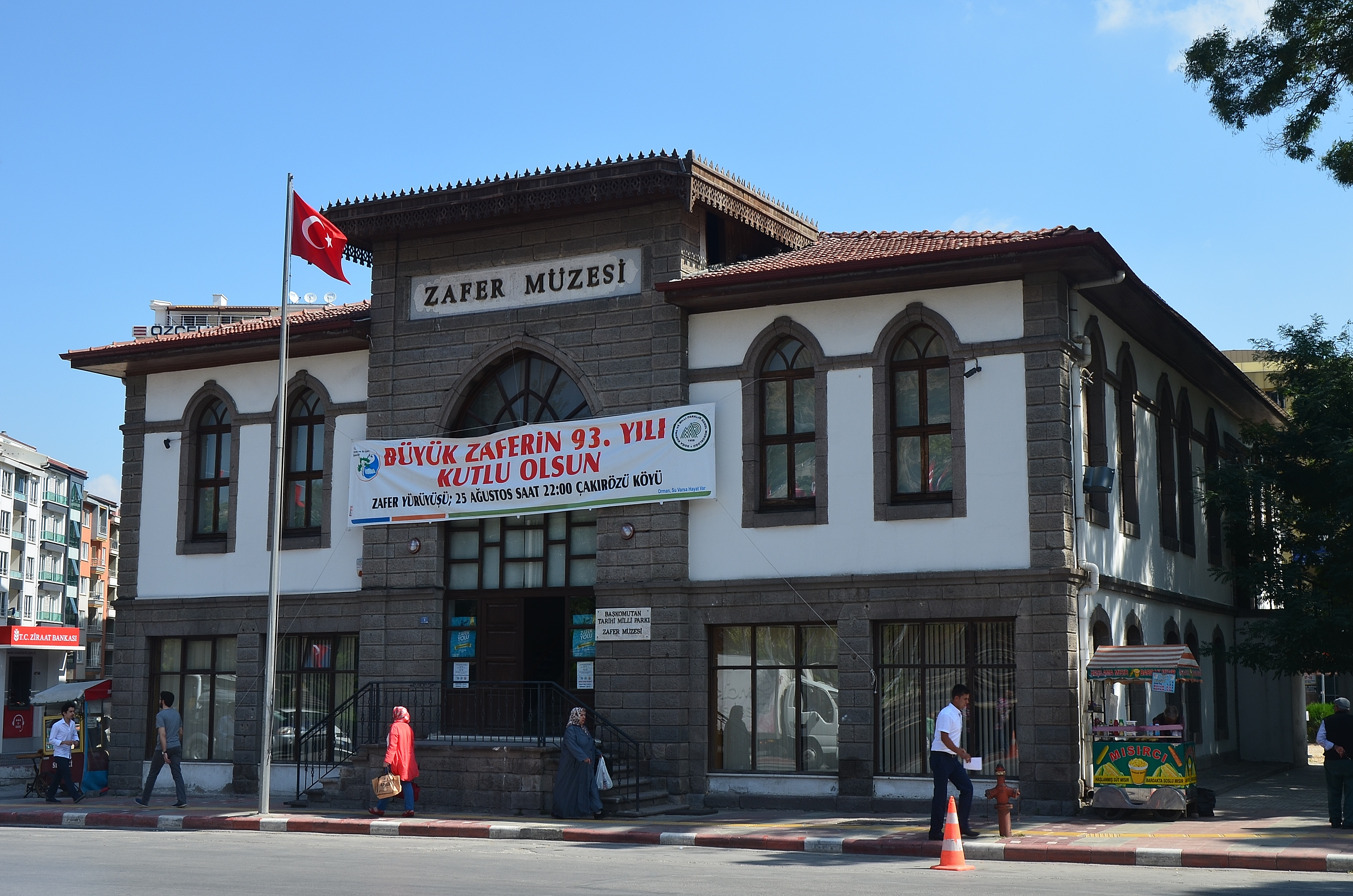

- Location of Victory Museum in Turkey
- Location: Afyonkarahisar, Turkey
- Coordinates: 38.75805°N 30.53820°E
- Type: Military and war

The Victory Museum (Turkish: Zafer Müzesi) is a national military and war museum in Afyonkarahisar, Turkey, which was used as headquarters by then Commander-in-Chief Mustafa Kemal Pasha (Atatürk), his chief general staff and army commanders before the Great Offensive in August 1922.
