= Afyonkarahisar Archaeological Museum =

Museum in Afyonkarahisar, Turkey

- Afyonkarahisar Arkeoloji Müzesi
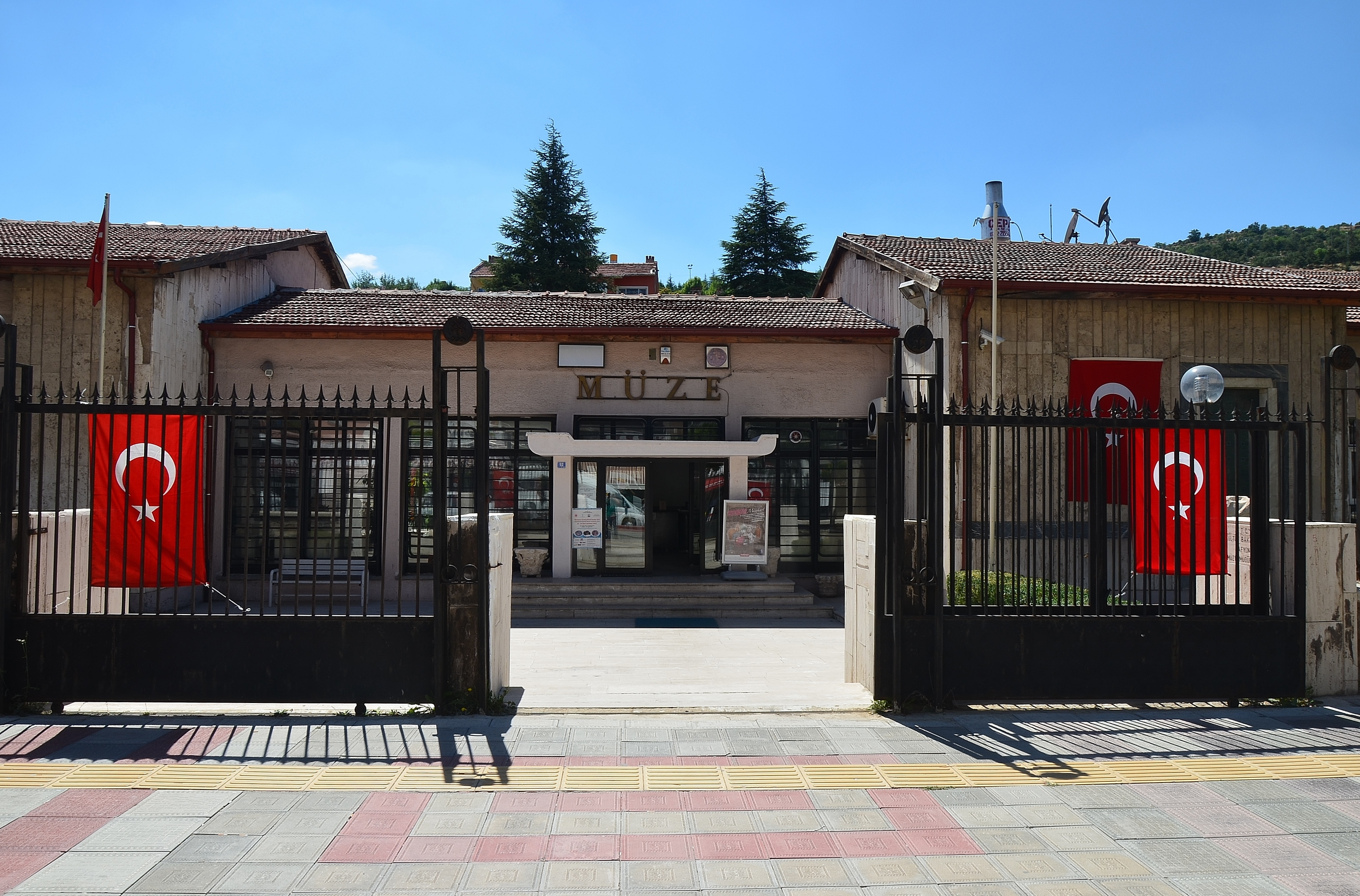
- Entrance to the Afyonkarahisar Archaeological Museum

- Location of Afyonkarahisar Archaeological Museum in Turkey
- Established: 1933; 93 years ago
- Location: Kurtuluş Cad. 96, Afyonkarahisar, Turkey
- Coordinates: 38.74773°N 30.55064°E
- Type: Archeology
- Collections: Copper Age; Bronze Age; Hittites; Phrygians; Ancient Greece; Byzantine Empire; Seljuk Empire; Ottoman Empire
- Collection size: 13,276 archaeological; 4,484 ethnographical; 26,564 coins; 26 archive documents; 33 hand-written books; 44,383 Total

The Afyonkarahisar Archaeological Museum (Turkish: Afyonkarahisar Arkeoloji Müzesi), also known as the Afyon Museum, is an archaeological museum in Afyonkarahisar, Turkey. It exhibits a wide variety of artifacts from the Copper Age, Bronze Age and the civilizations of Hittites, Phrygians, Ancient Greece and the Byzantine Empire.

== Background ==
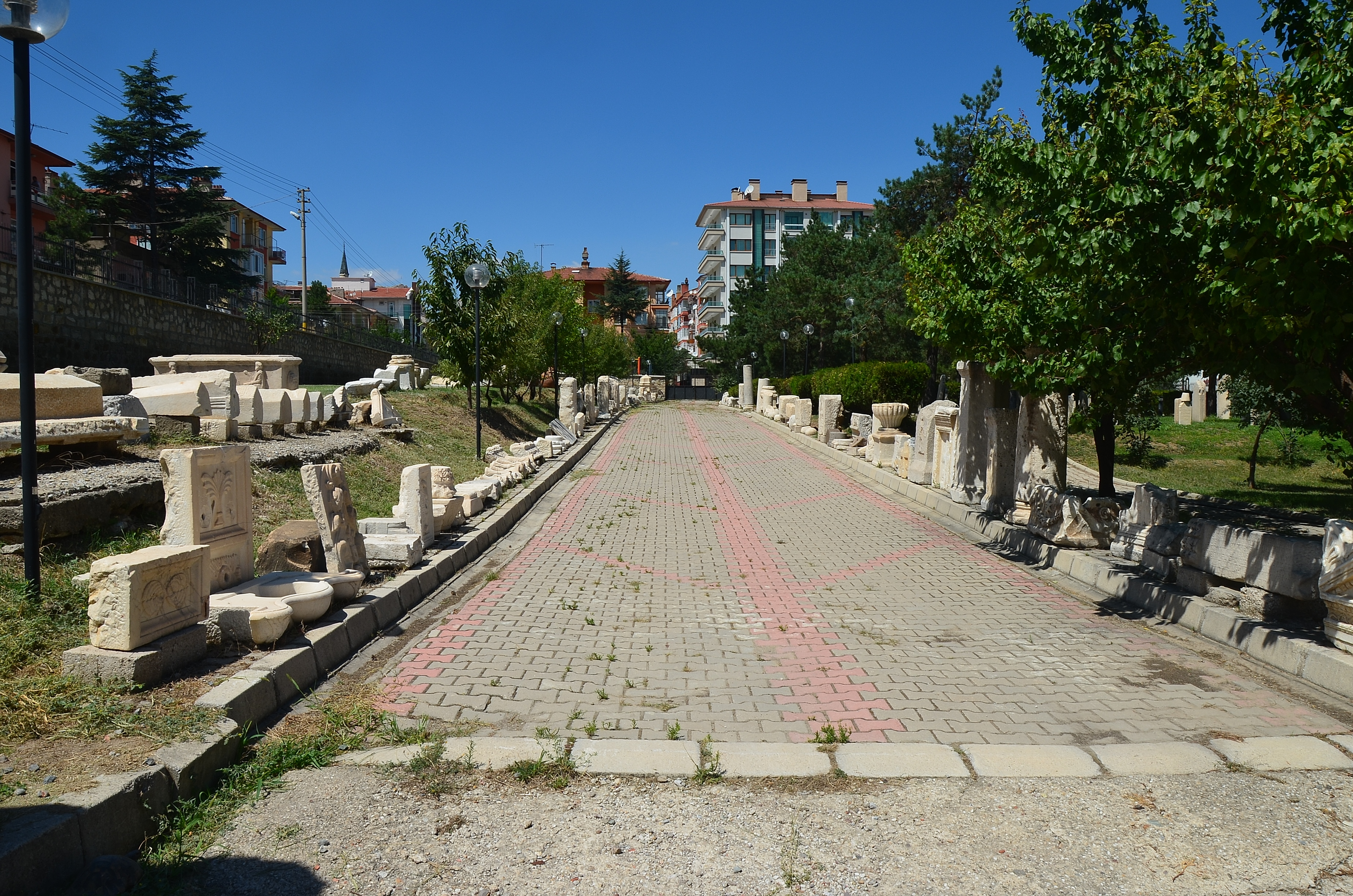
Museum's backyard

The initiative to establish a museum in Afyonkarahisar and to record the province's chronicle goes back to 1928 when in the early years of the Republic studies were carried out initially by the "Lovers of Artifacts Society" (Ottoman Turkish: Âsar-ı Atika Muhibleri Cemiyeti) and later by the "Community Center" (Turkish: Halkevi). Following the efforts led by the society's president Süleyman Hilmi (Gönçer), a teacher, and his colleague Oğuz (Günel), artifacts collected from various archaeological sites were stored up in the vacant Gedik Ahmed Pasha Madrasa, (Taş Medrese, "Stone Madrasa").

As the number of objects grew up, the idea emerged for the establishment of a museum. In 1931, the museum was founded in the form of an office, and Süleyman Hilmi (Gönçer) was appointed as its supervisor. In 1933, the museum was opened, and he became its first director. Under his leadership, it then rose up to the status of a regional museum. With the support of the Community Center, he collected archaeological artifacts from the provinces Uşak, Burdur, Isparta and Aydın, as well as ethnographical items from the provinces of Aydın and Kütahya for the museum.

In 1935, the museum made a name with archaeological excavations and finds at the Kusura, Sandıklı Tumulus. The importance of the museum rose further with the great number of artifacts collected, their big dimensions and also their property of being unique or in groups. When archaeologist Hasan Tahsin Uçankuş came to the city in 1964, he started to apply methods of contemporary and scientific archaeology as well as of museology. Consequently, the need of a new museum with archaeological emphasis emerged, and the museum was moved to its current place in 1971 as a regional museum or the Museum of Phrygia losing its mixed type.

In the early years, only Bursa and Konya owned such museums in the near region. The status of the Afyonkarahisar Museum fell from regional to provincial after museums were opened in the neighboring cities. However, it is still one of the biggest museums in the country, and maintains its attraction at international level.

The museum is housed today in a one-story building, which consists of nine interconnected exhibition halls, five office rooms, a library and a conference hall. In addition, five depots, a photography workshop and a laboratory are situated in the basement.

== Exhibits ==
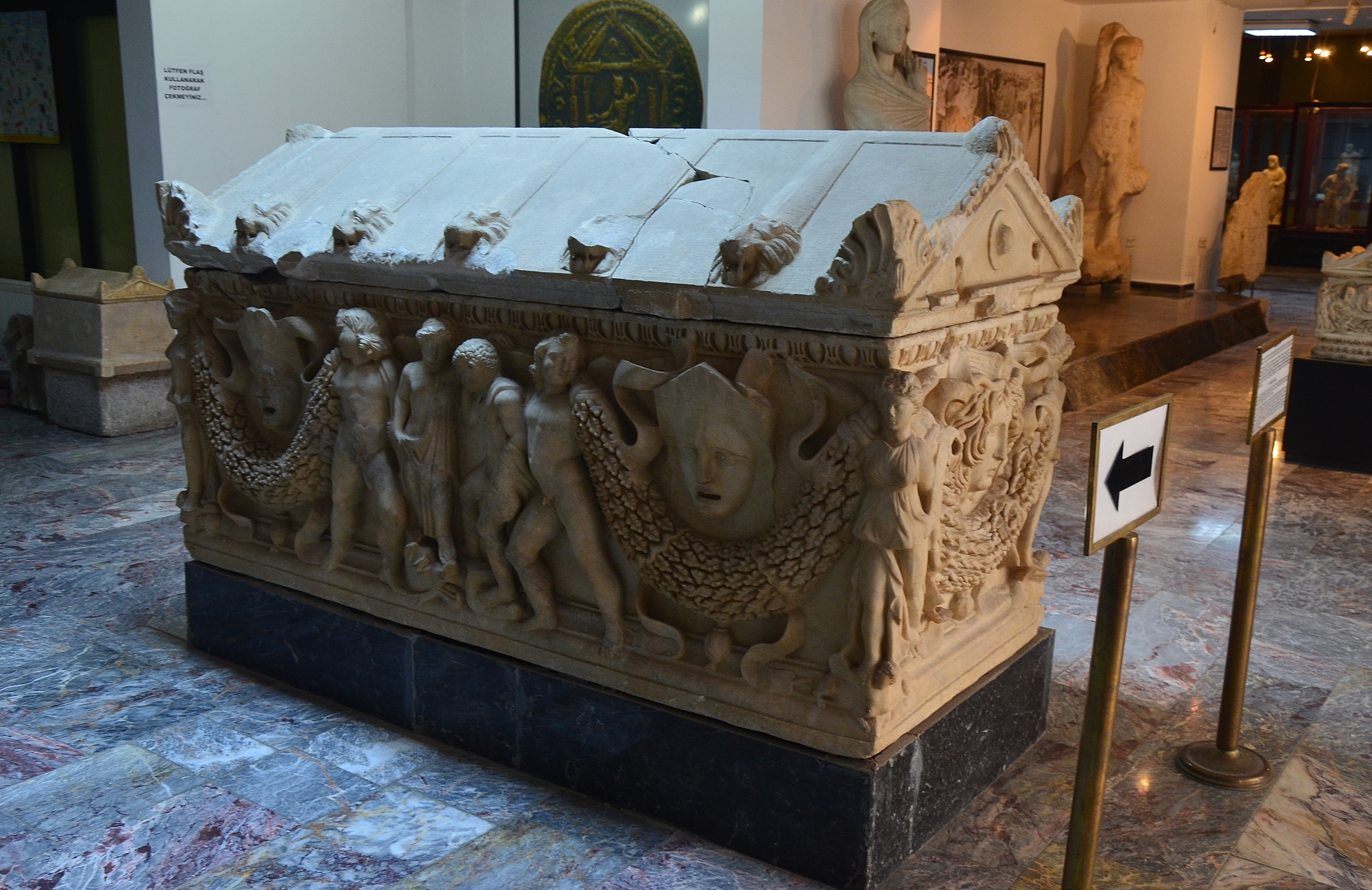
Ancient Roman (2nd century AD) sarcophagus of Apamea (Phrygia), today Dinar.

The time span of the museum exhibits reach around 5000 years from the Bronze Age until today. The artifacts are from the Chalcolithic Age, Bronze Age and the civilizations of Hittites, Phrygians, Ancient Greece and Byzantine Empire collected from excavations at around 40 tumuli and 20 ancient cities in the region. Various sculptures, architectural elements, large earthenware, steles, sarcophagi as well as gravestones from the Seljuk and Ottoman Era are also on display in the big backyard of the museum. Its coin collection, well-preserved statues of Ancient Greek deities and cutting and lethal tools enhances the importance of the museum. The archaeological items exhibited in the building are organized in chronological order. Many Turkish-Islamic items can not be displayed due to insufficient space in the museum building.

Currently, the museum owns a total of 44,383 objects, including 13,276 archaeological, 4,484 ethnographical, 26,252 coins, 26 archive documents and 33 hand-written books.

== Access ==
The museum is located in downtown Afyonkarahisar, in the Kurtuluş Cad. 96. It is open between 8:30 and 17:30 local time, but closed on Mondays.
