= Afyonkarahisar =

- Municipality
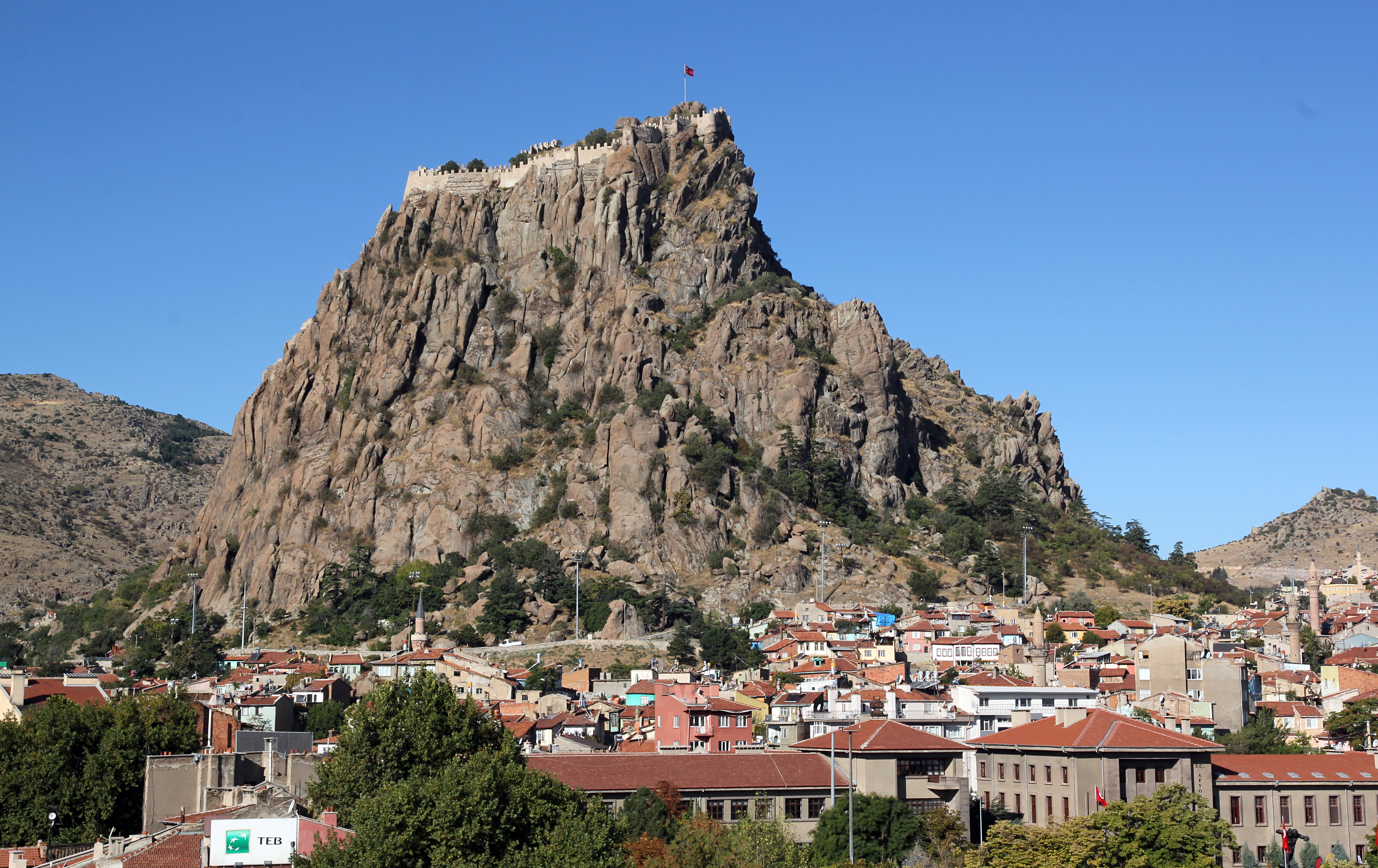
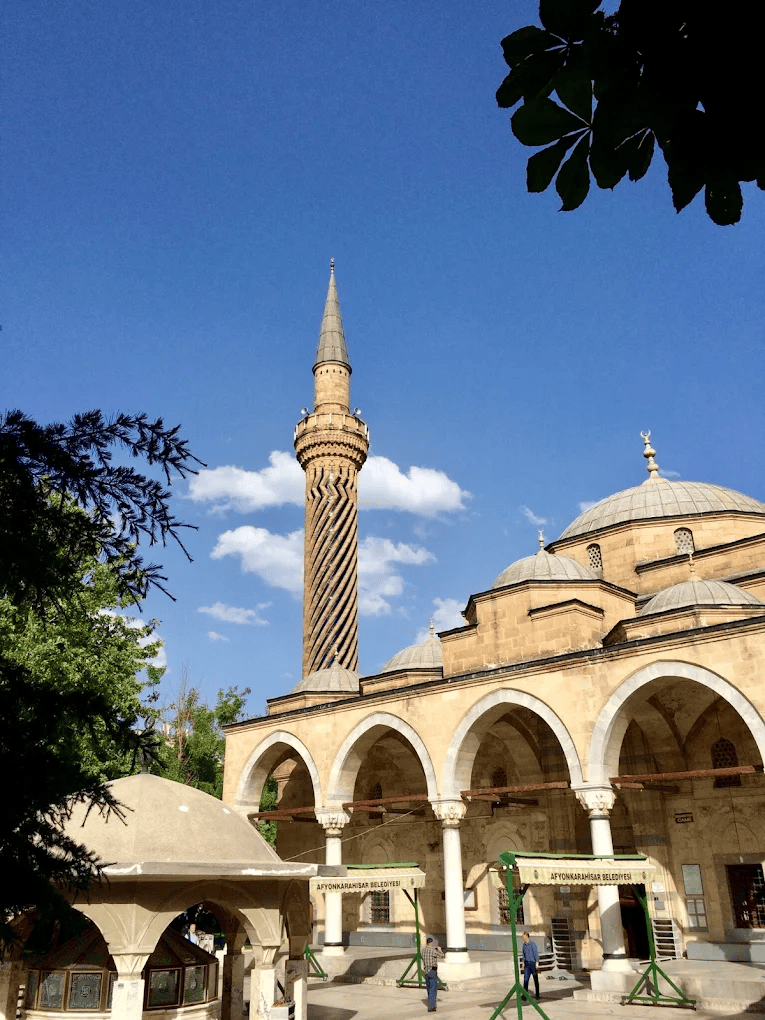
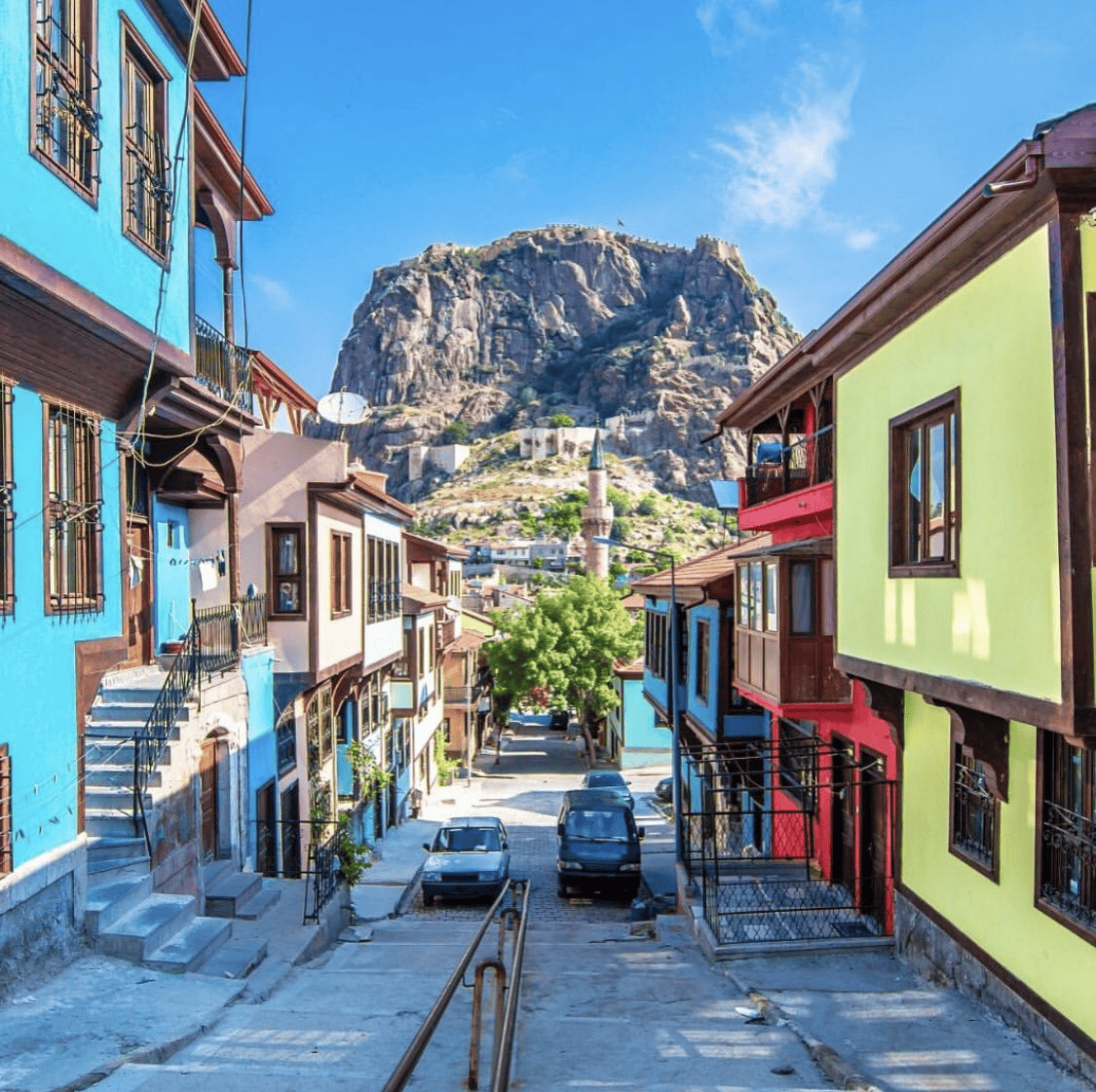
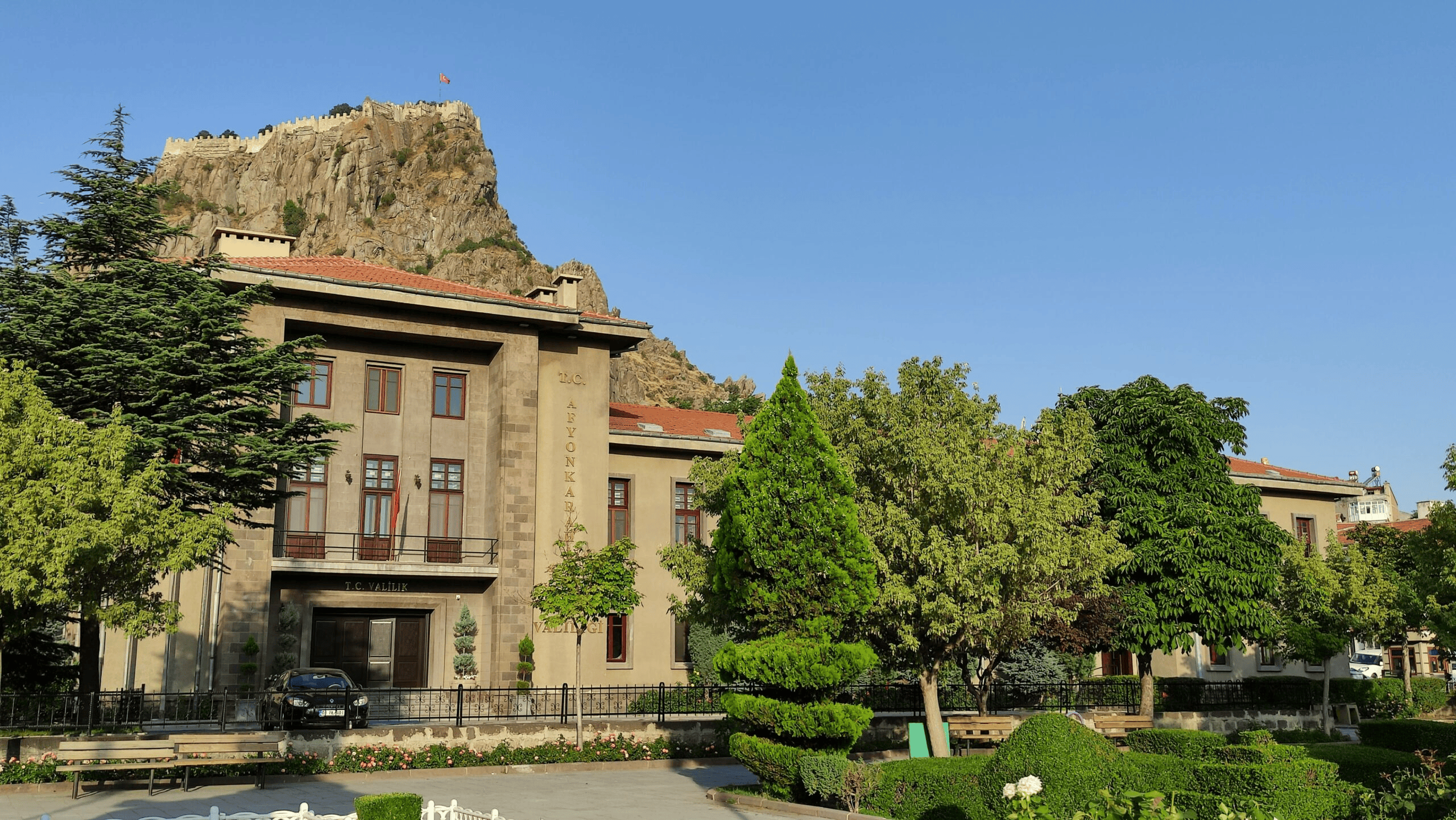
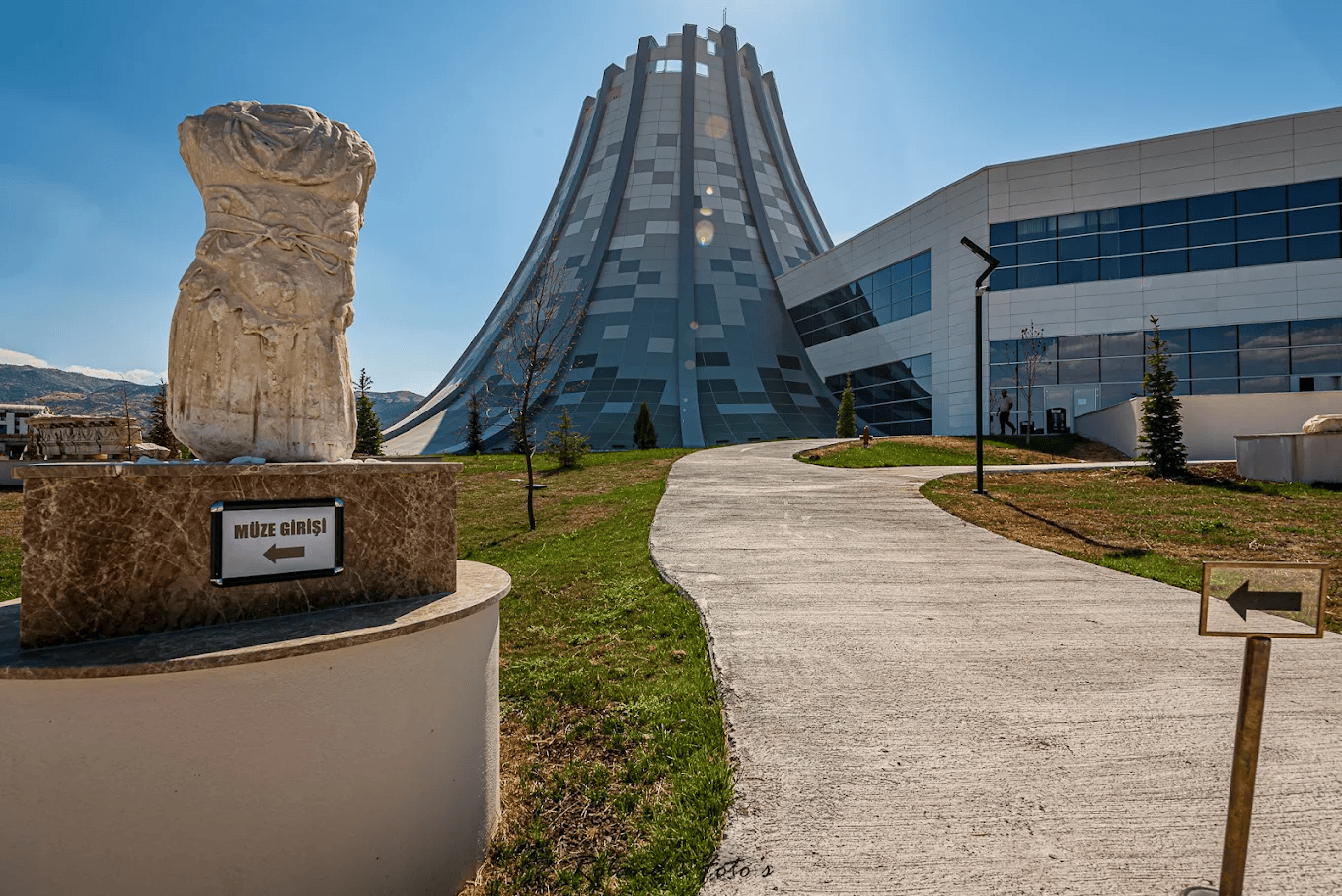
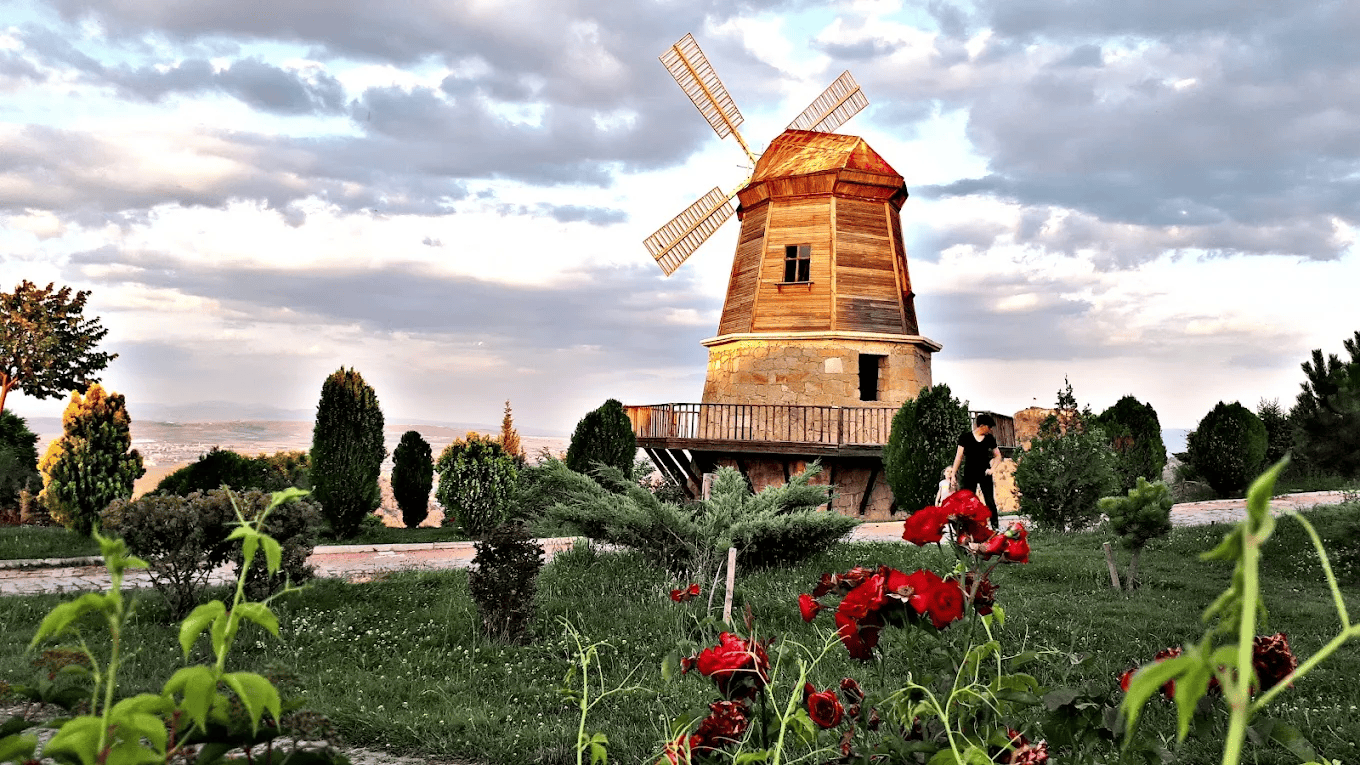
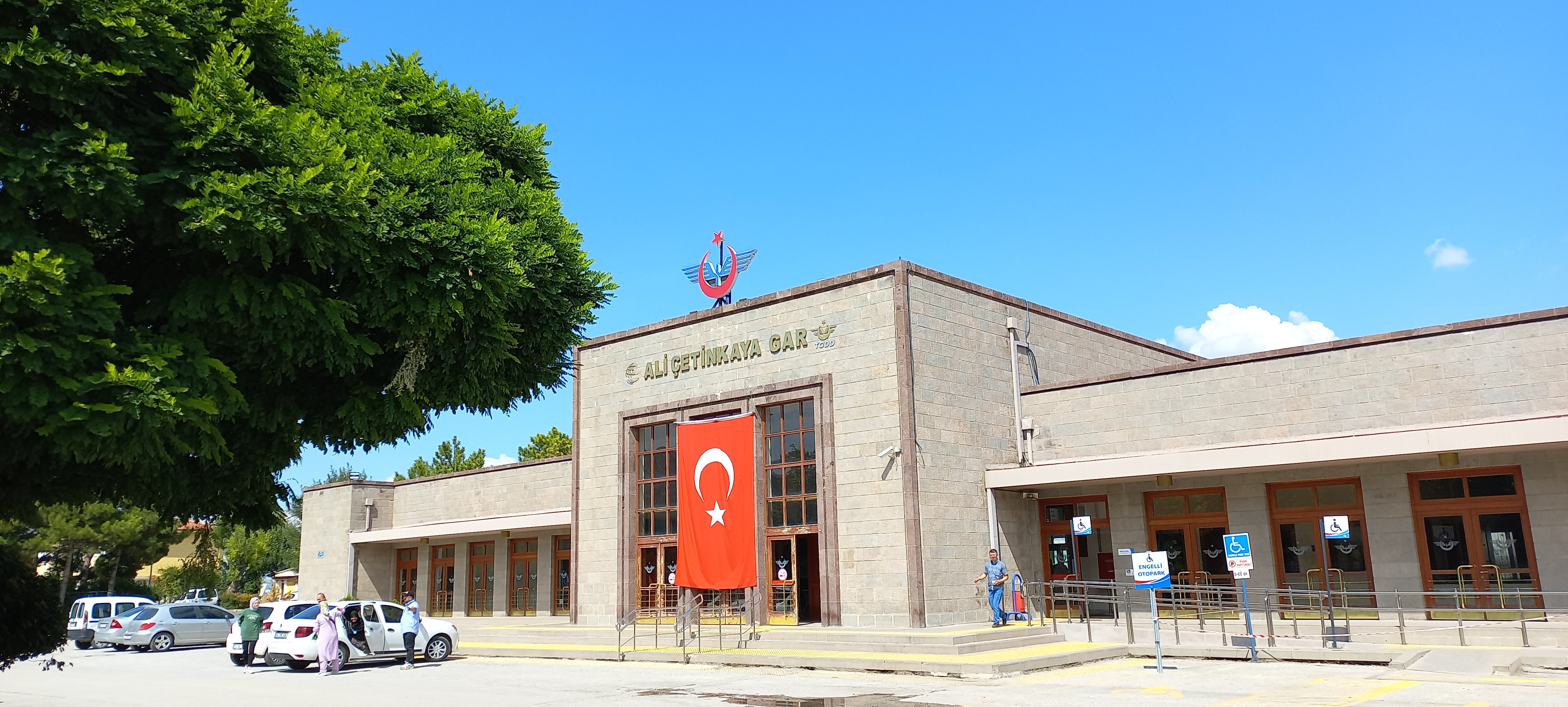
- Top to bottom, left to right: Afyonkarahisar Castle; Gedik Ahmet Pasha Madrasa (Taş Medrese); traditional Afyonkarahisar houses; Historic Municipality and Government House; Afyonkarahisar Museum; Historic mill; Ali Çetinkaya railway station, the city's main railway station

- Logo

- Location within Turkey Location within Turkey Aegean
- Coordinates: 38°45′28″N 30°32′19″E
- Country: Turkey
- Province: Afyonkarahisar
- District: Afyonkarahisar

Government
  - Mayor: Burcu Köksal (AK Party)
- Elevation: 1,021 m (3,350 ft)
- Population (2025): 260 577
- Time zone: UTC+3 (TRT)
- Postal code: 03000
- Licence plate: 03
- Website: www.afyon.bel.tr

Afyonkarahisar (Turkish pronunciation: [ɑfˌjon.kɑˈɾɑhisɑɾ], Turkish: afyon 'poppy, opium', kara 'black', hisar 'fortress') is a major city in western Turkey. It is the administrative centre of Afyonkarahisar Province and Afyonkarahisar District. Its urban population is 260,577, while its district has a population of 328,319 (2024). Afyonkarahisar joined the UNESCO Global Network of Learning Cities in 2020.

Afyon is in the mountainous countryside inland from the Aegean coast, 250 km (155 mi) south-west of Ankara along the Akarçay River. In Turkey, Afyonkarahisar stands out as a capital city of hot springs and spas, an important junction of railway, highway and air traffic in West-Turkey, and the place where independence was won. In addition, Afyonkarahisar is one of Turkey's leading provinces in agriculture, globally renowned for its marble and is the world's largest producer of pharmaceutical opium.

In antiquity, the city was called Akroinon and it is the site of Afyonkarahisar Castle, built around 1350 BC.

== Etymology ==
The name Afyon Kara Hisar literally means opium black fortress in Turkish, since opium was widely grown there and there is a castle on a black rock. It is also known simply as Afyon. Older spellings include Karahisar-i Sahip, Afium-Kara-hissar and Afyon Karahisar. The city was known as Afyon (opium), until the name was changed to Afyonkarahisar by the Turkish Parliament in 2004.

== History ==
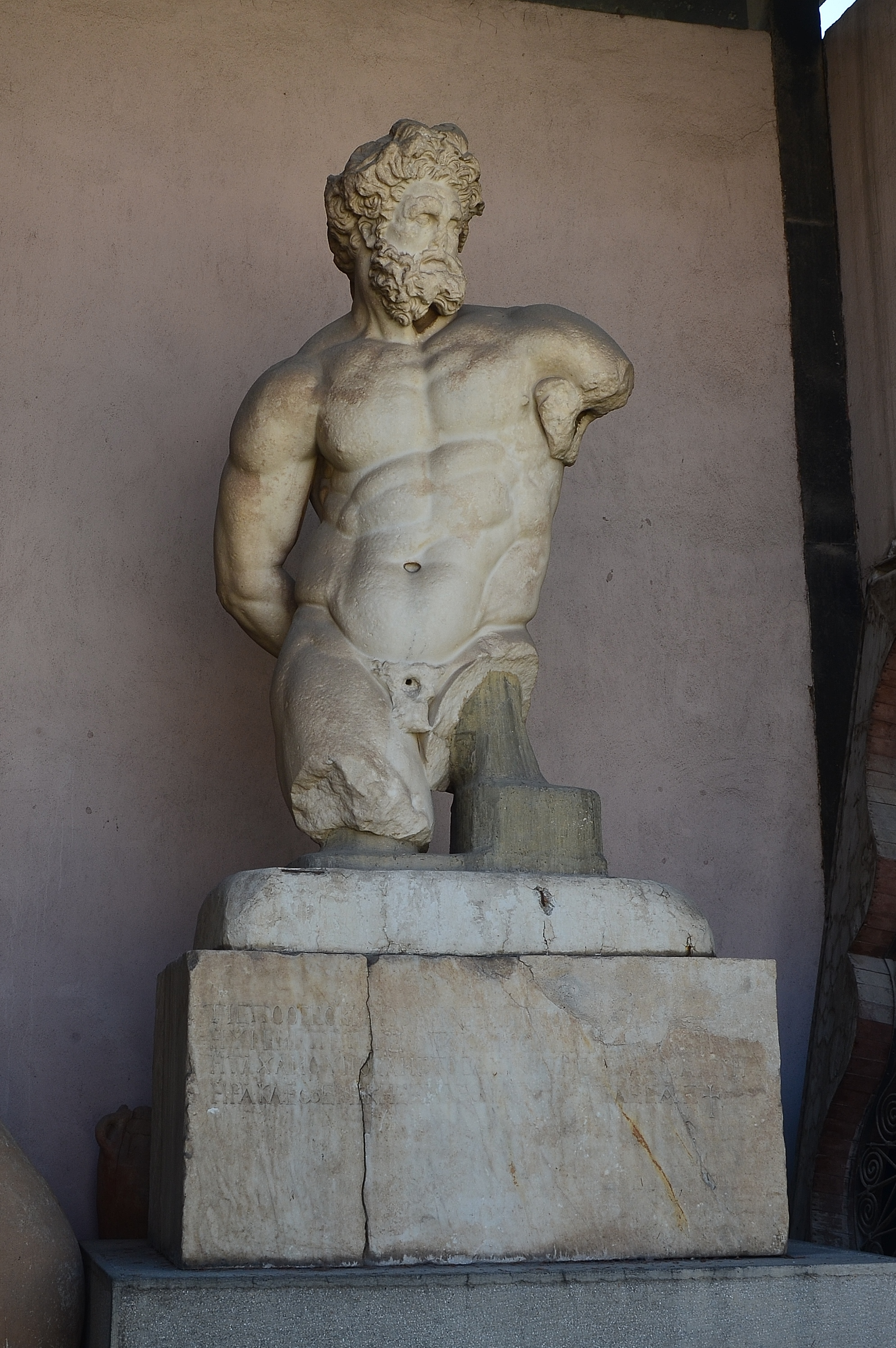
Statue of Zeus at Afyonkarahisar Archaeological Museum in Afyonkarahisar, Turkey

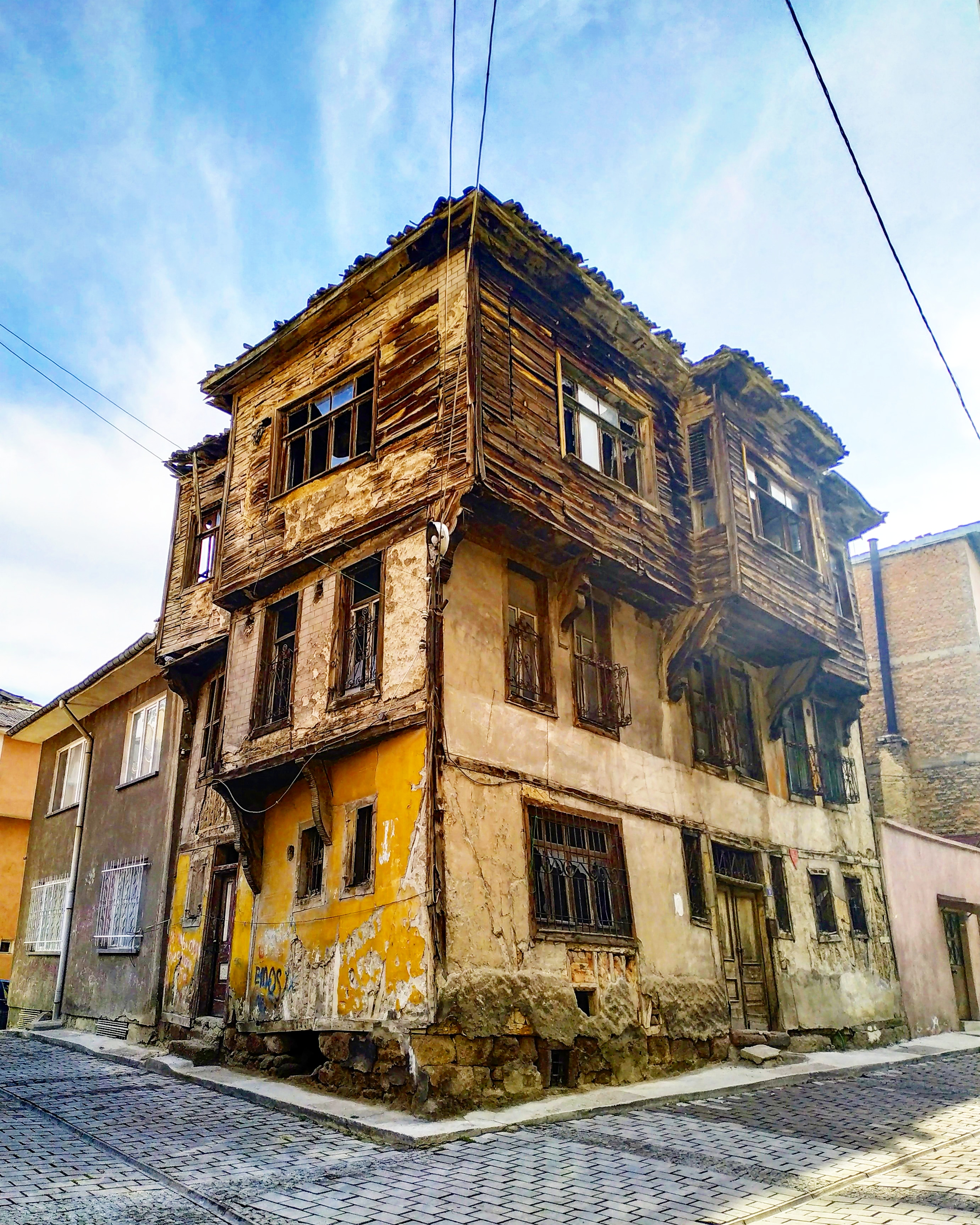
An old mansion in the historic part of Afyonkarahisar

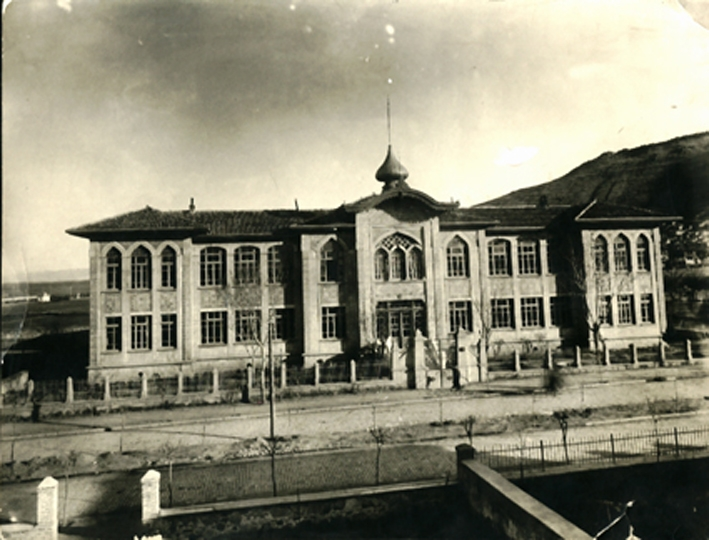
Afyon High School, early 1900s

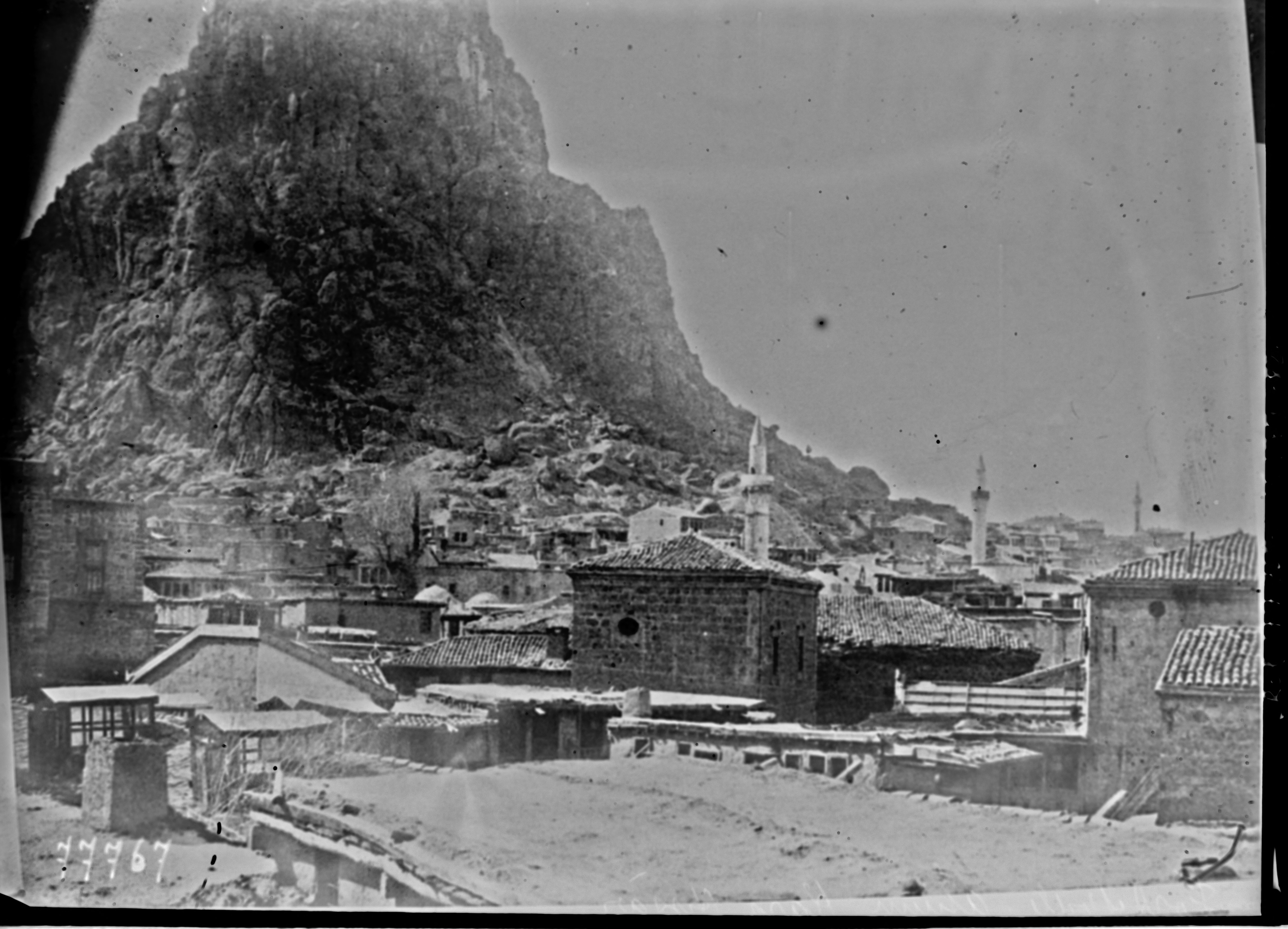
Fort and town of Afium Kara Hissar, 1922

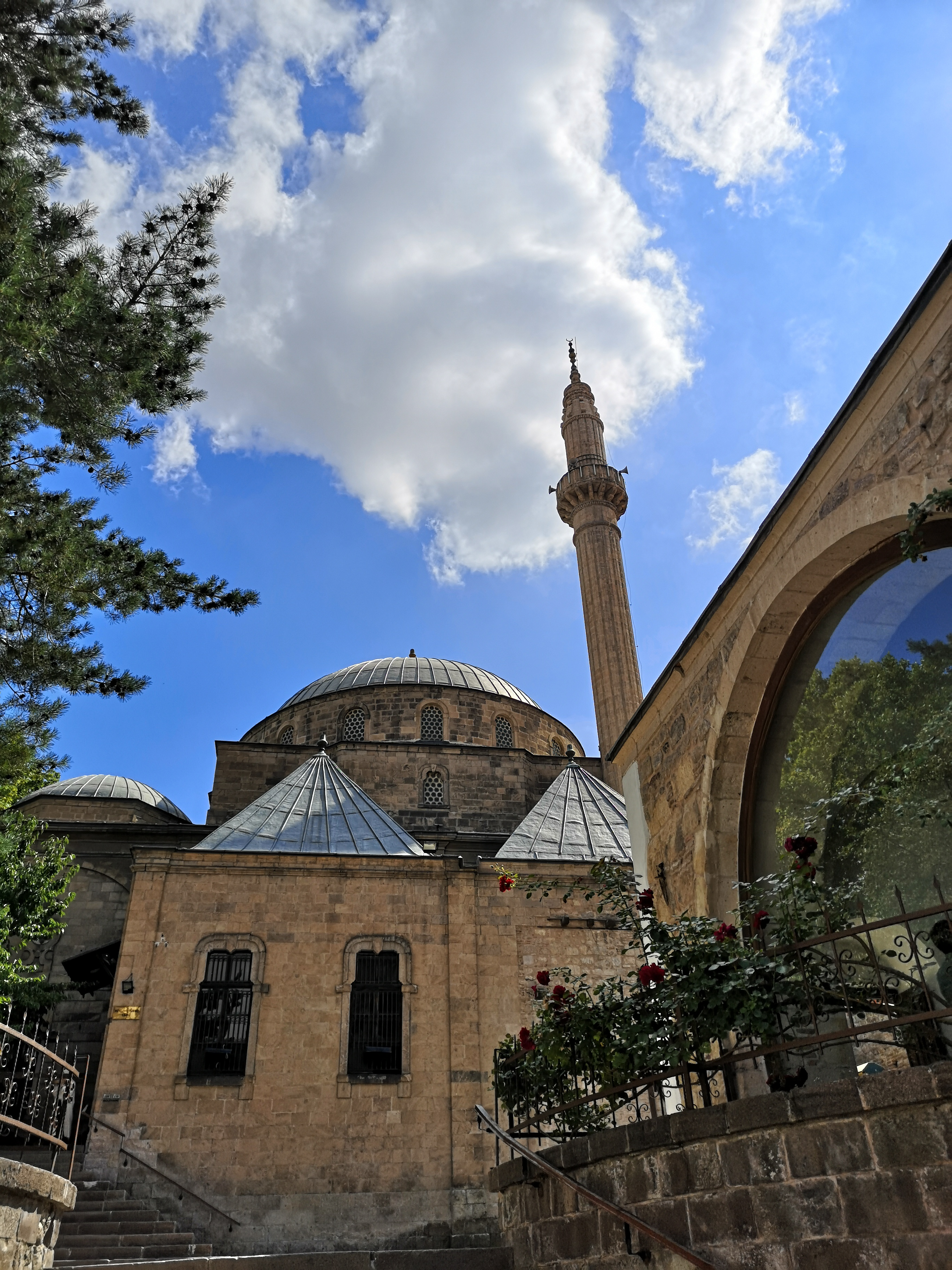
Sultan Divani Tomb Mevlevi Mosque in Afyonkarahisar

=== Late Bronze Age ===
The top of the rock in Afyon has been fortified for a long time. It was known to the Hittites as "Hapanuwa".

Historical affiliations

Hittites c. 1600–1200 BC
Phrygia c. 800–695 BC
Achaemenid Empire c. 547–333 BC
Macedonian Empire 333–323 BC
Kingdom of Pergamon c. 281–133 BC
Roman Empire 133 BC–395 AD
Byzantine Empire 395–1071
Seljuk Empire 1071–1077
Sultanate of Rum 1077–1243
Ilkhanate 1243–1335
Germiyanids c. 1300–1429
Ottoman Empire 1429–1922
Turkey 1923–present

=== Iron Age ===
In the Iron Age, it was occupied by Phrygians and Lydians.

=== Classical Age ===
The Achaemenid Persians occupied it until it was conquered by Alexander the Great. After the death of Alexander the city (now known as Akroinοn (Ακροϊνόν) or Nikopolis (Νικόπολις) in Ancient Greek), was ruled by the Seleucids and the kings of Pergamon, then Rome and Byzantium.

=== Medieval period ===
Akroinοn became an important fortress in the Armeniakon theme due to its strategic location and natural defences and was first mentioned in Byzantine history when it was attacked in 716 and 732 by Arab invaders. The Byzantine emperor Leo III renamed the city Nicopolis (Greek for "city of victory") after his victory over Arab besiegers under Abdallah al-Battal (who would become the famous Turkish literature figure of Battal Gazi) in 740. Since the 10th century it was also a bishopric of Phrygia Salutaris.

After 1071 the town became part of the frontier zone between the Byzantine Empire and the invading Turks. The city was still held by the former in 1112 but was lost to the Sultanate of Rum at some time before 1146 when Manuel I Komnenos won a victory there. The Turks were unable to firmly control the city until around 1210, renaming it to Kara Hissar ("black castle") after the ancient fortress situated upon a volcanic rock 201 meters above the town. Following the dispersal of the Seljuqs the town was occupied by the Sâhib Ata and then the Germiyanids.

The castle was finally conquered by the Ottoman Sultan Beyazid I in 1392 but was lost after the invasion of Timur Lenk in 1402. It was recaptured in 1428 or 1429.

=== Modern times ===
From its situation on the route of the caravans between Smyrna and western Asia on the one hand and places such as Armenia and Georgia on the other, the city became a place of extensive trade. It thrived during the Ottoman Empire as the centre of opium production, with Afyon becoming a wealthy city. From 1867 until 1922, Afyon was part of the Hüdavendigâr vilayet of the Ottoman Empire. In 1902, a fire burning for 32 hours destroyed parts of the city.

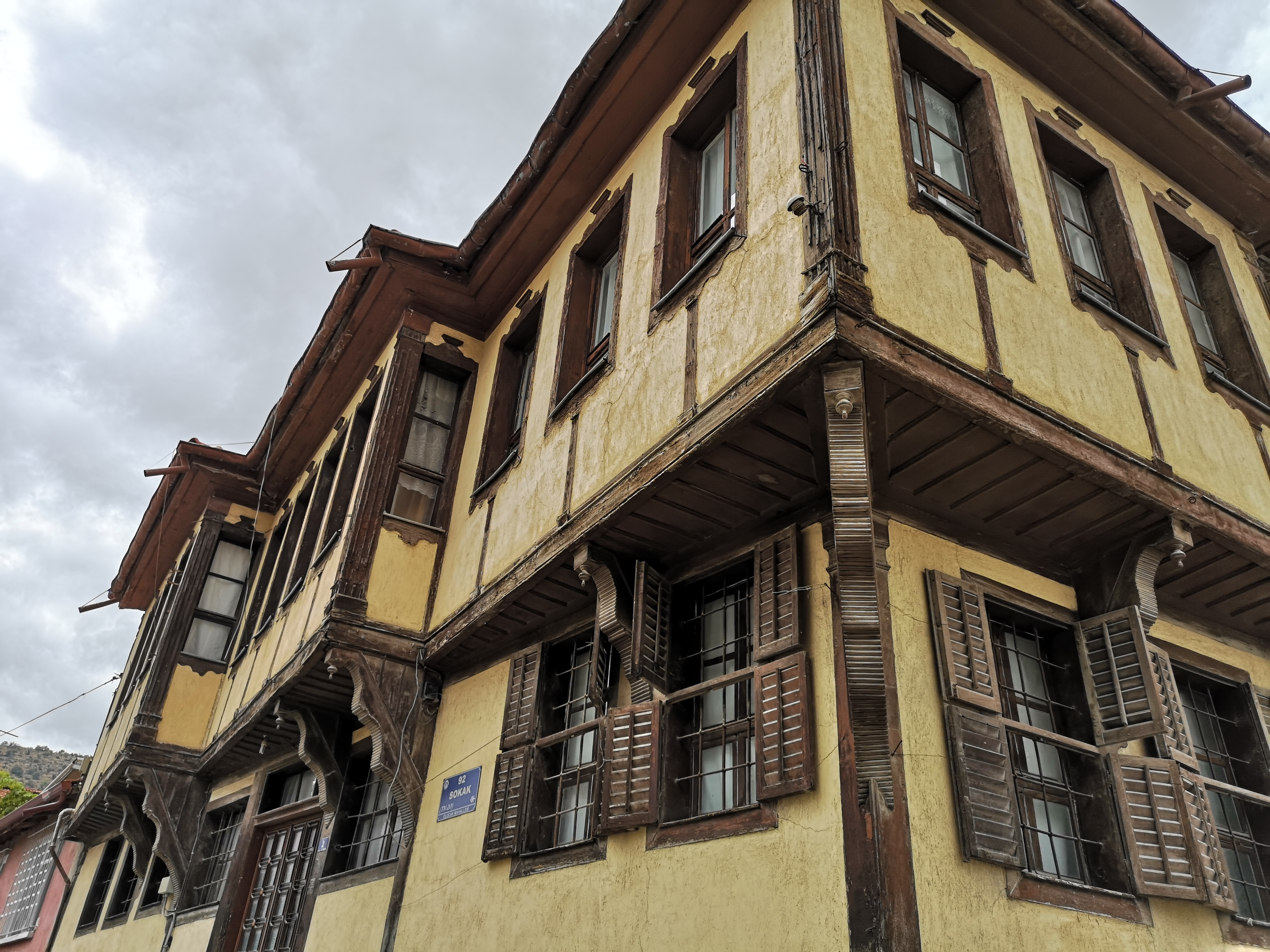
Ottoman architecture in Afyonkarahisar

During the First World War, British prisoners of war who had been captured at Gallipoli were housed there in an empty Armenian church at the foot of the rock. During the Greco-Turkish War (1919-1922) campaign (part of the Turkish War of Independence) Afyon and the surrounding hills were occupied by Greek forces. However, it was recovered on 27 August 1922, a key moment in the Turkish counter-attack in the Aegean region. After 1923 Afyon became a part of the Republic of Turkey.

The region was a major producer of raw opium (hence the name Afyon) until the late 1960s when under international pressure, from the US in particular, the fields were burnt and production ceased. Now poppies are grown under a strict licensing regimen. They do not produce raw opium any more but derive morphine and other opiates using the poppy straw method of extraction.

Afyon was depicted on the reverse of the Turkish 50 lira banknote of 1927–1938.

== Economy ==
The economy of Afyonkarahisar is based on its marble and pharmaceutical industries, tourism, as well as agriculture from its rural population.

=== Marble ===
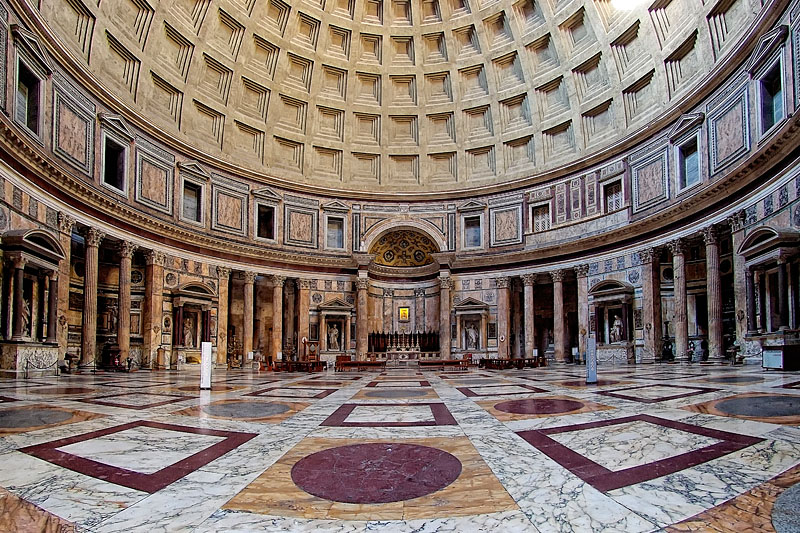
Pantheon, Rome. White Docimaean marble is used on the floor and some of the columns such as the two protruding columns of the main apse. The white Docimaean color on the floor is very dominant.

Afyonkarahisar produces an important chunk of Turkish processed marbles, it ranks second on processed marble exports and fourth on travertine. Afyon holds an important share of Turkish marble reserves, with some 12,2% of total Turkish reserves.

Historically marble from Afyon was generally referred to as "Docimeaen marble" due to the place where it was mined, Docimium. Afyon has unique marble types and colors, which were historically very renown and are unique to Afyon such as "Afyon white", historically known as "Synnadic white", "Afyon Menekse", historically known as "Pavonazzetto", and "Afyon kaplan postu", a less popular type.

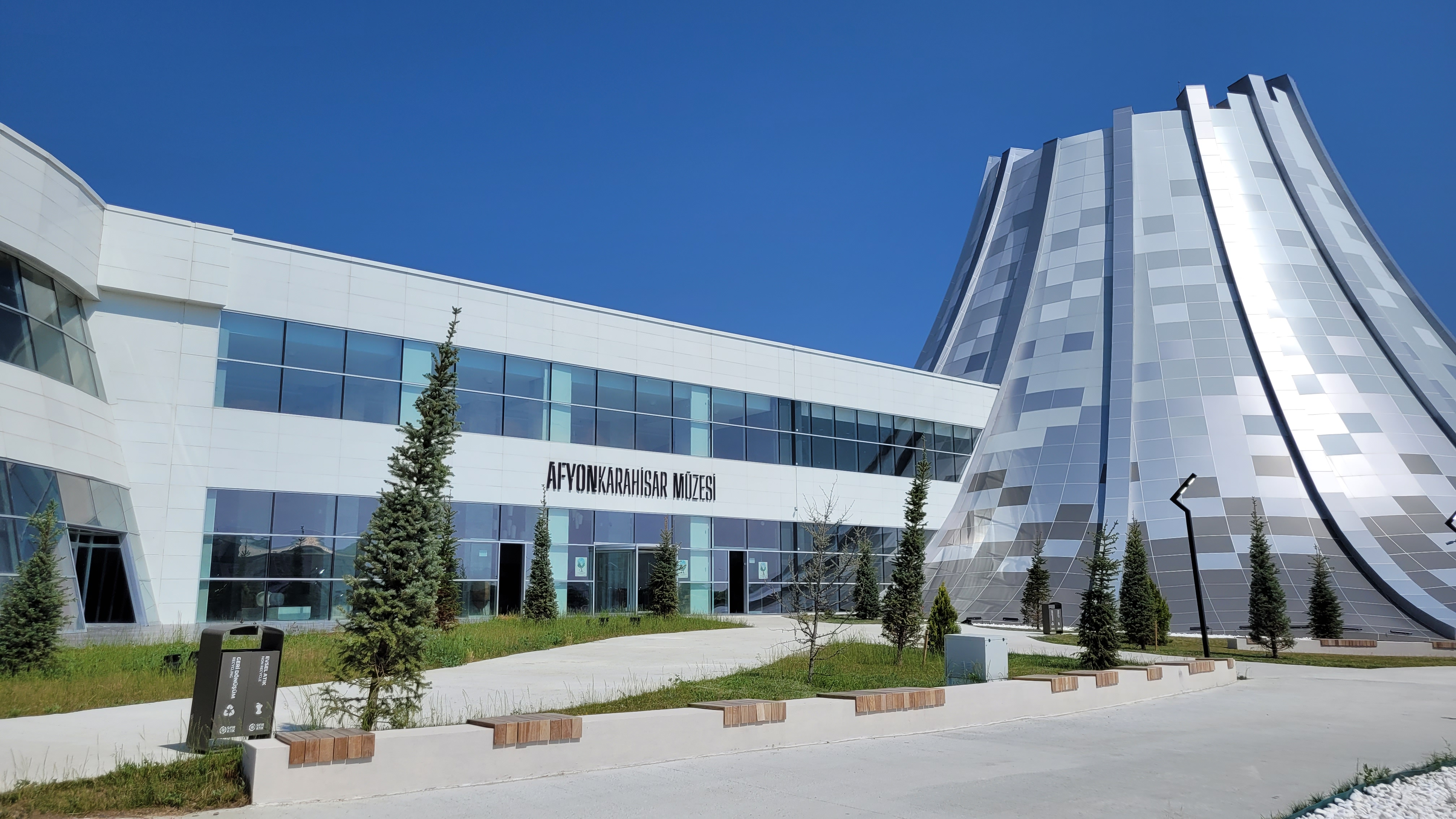
Exterior of Afyonkarahisar Museum

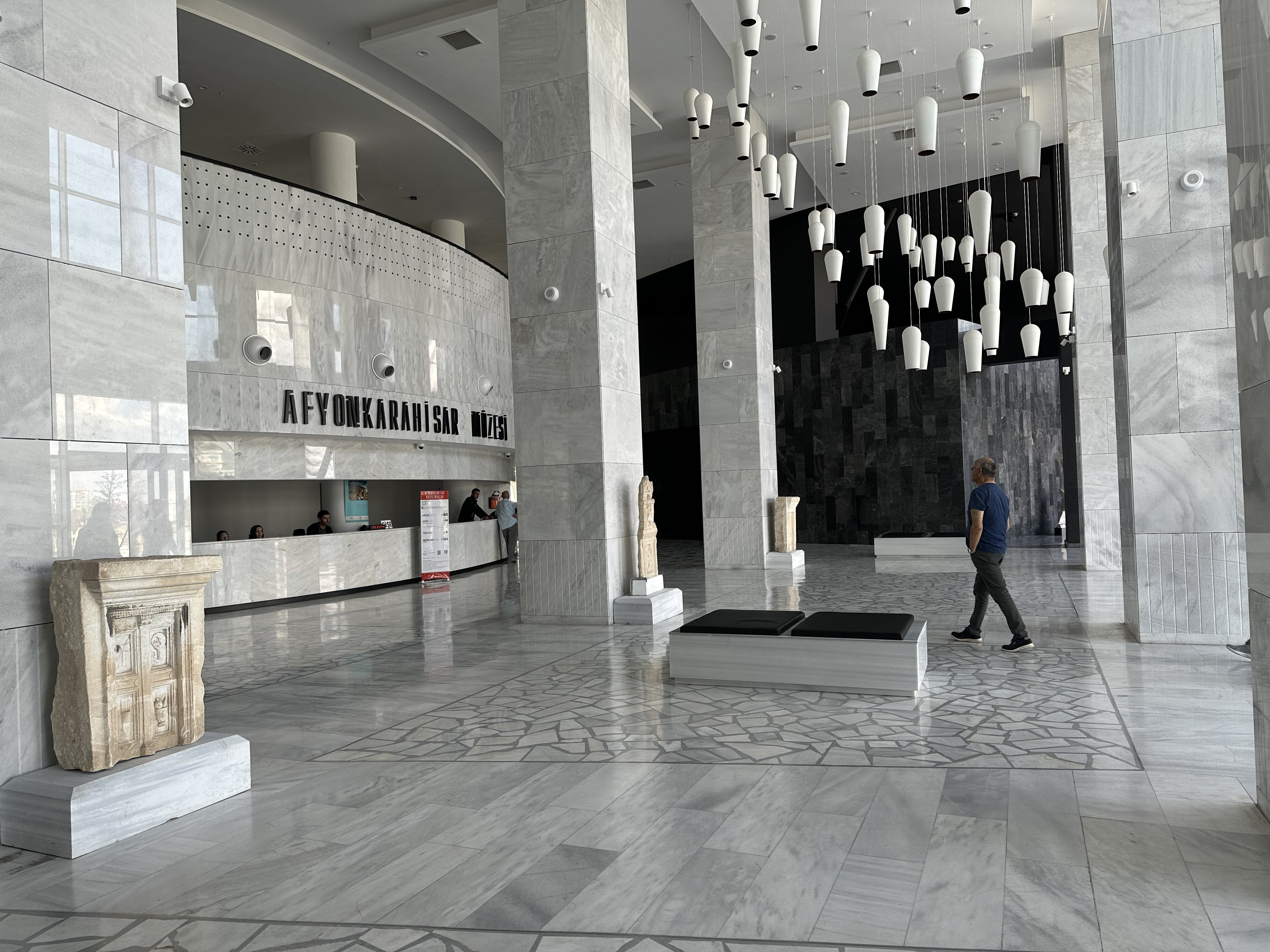
Interior of Afyonkarahisar Museum

Docimaean marble was highly admired and valued for its unique colors and fine grained quality by ancient people such as the Romans. When the Romans took control over Docimaean quarries, they were impressed by the beautiful color combinations of the Docimaean Pavonazzetto, which is a type of white marble with purple veins. Emperors such as Augustus, Trajan and Hadrian made extensive use of Docimaean marble to many of their major building projects. These include the Pantheon, Trajan's Forum and the Basilica Aemilia.

=== Thermal sector ===
The geography of Afyon has great geothermal activity. Hence, the place has plenty of thermal springs. There are five main springs and all of them have high mineral content with temperatures ranging between 40 and 100 °C. The waters have strong healing properties to some diseases. As a result, plenty of thermal facilities formed over time.

In time, Afyon has developed its thermal sector with more capacity, comfort and innovation. Afyon combined the traditional bath houses with 5-star resorts, the health benefits of the natural springs have made the thermal resorts more than a mere tourist attraction. Hospitals and universities have come in association with thermal resorts, to utilize the full health potentials of the thermals. As such, Afyon Kocatepe University Physical Therapy and Rehabilitation Hospital opened for that purpose. Afyon now has the largest residence capacity of thermal resorts, of which a large part are 5-star thermal hotels which give medical care with qualified personnel.

==== Spa water ====
Kızılay, was the first mineral water factory in Turkey which opened in Afyon, in 1926 by Atatürk. After the mineral water from Gazligöl springs, healed Atatürk's kidneys and proved its health benefits. Since its foundation, "Kızılay Mineral Water" grew as the biggest mineral water distributor in Turkey, Middle-East and Balkans.

=== Pharmaceuticals and morphine ===
Almost a third of all the morphine produced in the world derives from alkaloids factory in Afyon, named as "Afyon Alkaloids". this large capacity is the byproduct of Afyon's poppy plantations. The pharmaceuticals derive from the opium of the poppy capsules. "Afyon Alkaloids" factory is the largest of its kind in the world, with high capacity processing ability and modern laboratories. The raw opium is put through a chain of biochemical processes, resulting into several types of morphine.

In the Alkaloid Extraction Unit only base morphine is produced. In the adjacent Derivatives Unit half of the morphine extracted is converted to morphine hydrochloride, codeine, codeine phosphate, codeine sulphate, codeine hydrochloride, morphine sulphate, ethylmorphine hydrochloride.

=== Agriculture ===
Afyon breeds a large amount of livestock; its landscape and demography is suitable for this field. As such it ranks in the top 10 within Turkey in terms of amounts of sheep and cattle it has.

Bbeing an important source of livestock, related sectors such as meat and meat products are also very productive in Afyon. Its one of the leading provinces in red meat production and has very prestigious brand marks of sausages, such as "Cumhuriyet Sausages".

Afyon is the sole leader in egg production within Turkey. It has the largest amount of laying hens, with a figure of 12,7 million. And produces a record amount of 6 million eggs per day.

Sour cherries are cultivated in Afyon in very large numbers, and the crop has become a defining agricultural symbol of the province. Afyon is the largest producer of sour cherries in Turkey. The sour cherries grown in Afyon are of notable quality due to the ideal climate conditions of the province. Every year, a sour cherry festival takes place in the Cay district. In addition, high quality sweet cherries known as "Napolyon Cherries" are also grown in abundance.

One of the iconic agricultural practices of Afyon is the cultivation of poppy. Afyon's climate is ideal for the cultivation of this plant, hence a large amount of poppy plantation occurs in this region. Though, a strong limitation came some decades ago from international laws, cause of the opium content of poppy plants peels. Nevertheless, Afyon is the largest producer of poppy in Turkey and accounts for a large amount of global production.

Afyon has a durable reputation in potato production, it produces around 8% of Turkish potato requirement. It ranks in the top 5 in potato, sugar-beets, cucumber and barley production.

== Climate ==
Afyonkarahisar has a mediterranean climate (Csa) under the Köppen classification and an oceanic climate with a hot summer and a cool winter (Doak) under the Trewartha classification. The winters are cool and the summers are warm and dry with cool nights. Rainfall occurs mostly during the spring and autumn.

Highest recorded temperature: 39.8 °C (103.6 °F) on 29 July 2000
Lowest recorded temperature:−27.0 °C (−16.6 °F) on 28 January 1954

Climate data for Afyonkarahisar (1991–2020, extremes 1929–2023)
Month	Jan	Feb	Mar	Apr	May	Jun	Jul	Aug	Sep	Oct	Nov	Dec	Year
Record high °C (°F)	18.1 (64.6)	21.8 (71.2)	26.4 (79.5)	30.2 (86.4)	33.9 (93.0)	35.8 (96.4)	39.8 (103.6)	39.6 (103.3)	37.2 (99.0)	31.3 (88.3)	26.3 (79.3)	21.0 (69.8)	39.8 (103.6)
Mean daily maximum °C (°F)	4.6 (40.3)	7.1 (44.8)	11.7 (53.1)	16.6 (61.9)	21.8 (71.2)	26.2 (79.2)	30.3 (86.5)	30.2 (86.4)	25.9 (78.6)	19.7 (67.5)	12.8 (55.0)	6.8 (44.2)	17.8 (64.0)
Daily mean °C (°F)	0.4 (32.7)	2.2 (36.0)	6.0 (42.8)	10.5 (50.9)	15.3 (59.5)	19.4 (66.9)	22.8 (73.0)	22.8 (73.0)	18.5 (65.3)	13.0 (55.4)	6.9 (44.4)	2.5 (36.5)	11.7 (53.1)
Mean daily minimum °C (°F)	−3.0 (26.6)	−1.8 (28.8)	1.1 (34.0)	4.9 (40.8)	9.2 (48.6)	12.7 (54.9)	15.3 (59.5)	15.4 (59.7)	11.4 (52.5)	7.2 (45.0)	2.1 (35.8)	−0.8 (30.6)	6.1 (43.0)
Record low °C (°F)	−27.0 (−16.6)	−25.3 (−13.5)	−17.0 (1.4)	−7.6 (18.3)	−3.1 (26.4)	1.0 (33.8)	4.0 (39.2)	2.4 (36.3)	−3.2 (26.2)	−7.9 (17.8)	−20.5 (−4.9)	−24.3 (−11.7)	−27.0 (−16.6)
Average precipitation mm (inches)	46.9 (1.85)	38.4 (1.51)	44.6 (1.76)	47.0 (1.85)	50.1 (1.97)	41.5 (1.63)	21.8 (0.86)	18.0 (0.71)	23.6 (0.93)	40.3 (1.59)	32.4 (1.28)	46.8 (1.84)	451.4 (17.77)
Average precipitation days	12.37	12.4	12.37	11.6	11.8	8.07	3.6	4.27	4.63	7.97	7.57	12.87	109.5
Average snowy days	9.1	7.1	4.2	1.5	0	0	0	0	0	0	1.1	4.9	27.9
Average relative humidity (%)	77.7	72.1	65.1	61.2	59.9	56.5	49.6	50.8	53.6	63.9	70.3	77.7	63.3
Mean monthly sunshine hours	79.0	111.5	150.5	180.4	229.9	270.8	327.5	310.1	249.9	187.4	135.4	72.0	2,304.5
Mean daily sunshine hours	2.6	4.0	4.9	6.1	7.4	9.1	10.7	10.0	8.3	6.1	4.6	2.5	6.4
Source 1: Turkish State Meteorological Service
Source 2: NCEI (humidity, sun 1991-2020), Meteomanz(snow days 2000-2005 and 2014-2017)

== Transport ==
Afyon is also an important rail junction between İzmir, Konya, Ankara and Istanbul. Afyon is on the route of the planned high-speed rail line between Ankara and Izmir.

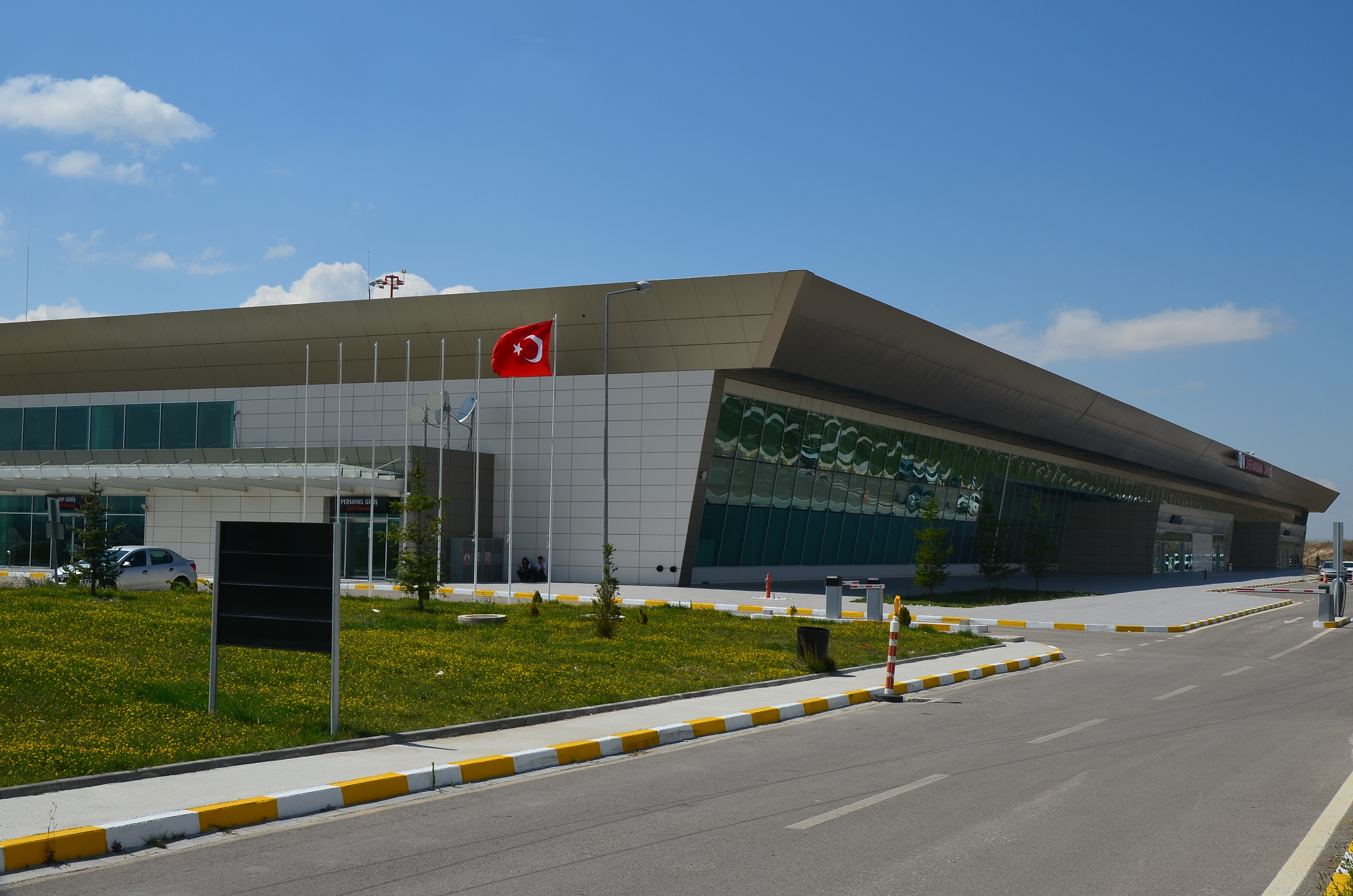
Zafer Airport

Zafer Airport, located 60 km from city center, serves Afyonkarahisar. Four flights per week to Istanbul, and seasonal flights to international destinations are available.

== Cuisine ==
=== Courses ===
  - sucuk - the famed local speciality, a spicy beef sausage, eaten fried or grilled. The best known brands include Cumhuriyet, Ahmet İpek, İkbal, İtimat, Üstünbey and Danet but only 2 brands has the geographical indication and these are Cumhuriyet & Danet (Vahdet Et).
  - ağzaçık or bükme - filo-style pastry stuffed with cheese or lentils.
  - keşkek - boiled wheat and chick peas stewed with meat.

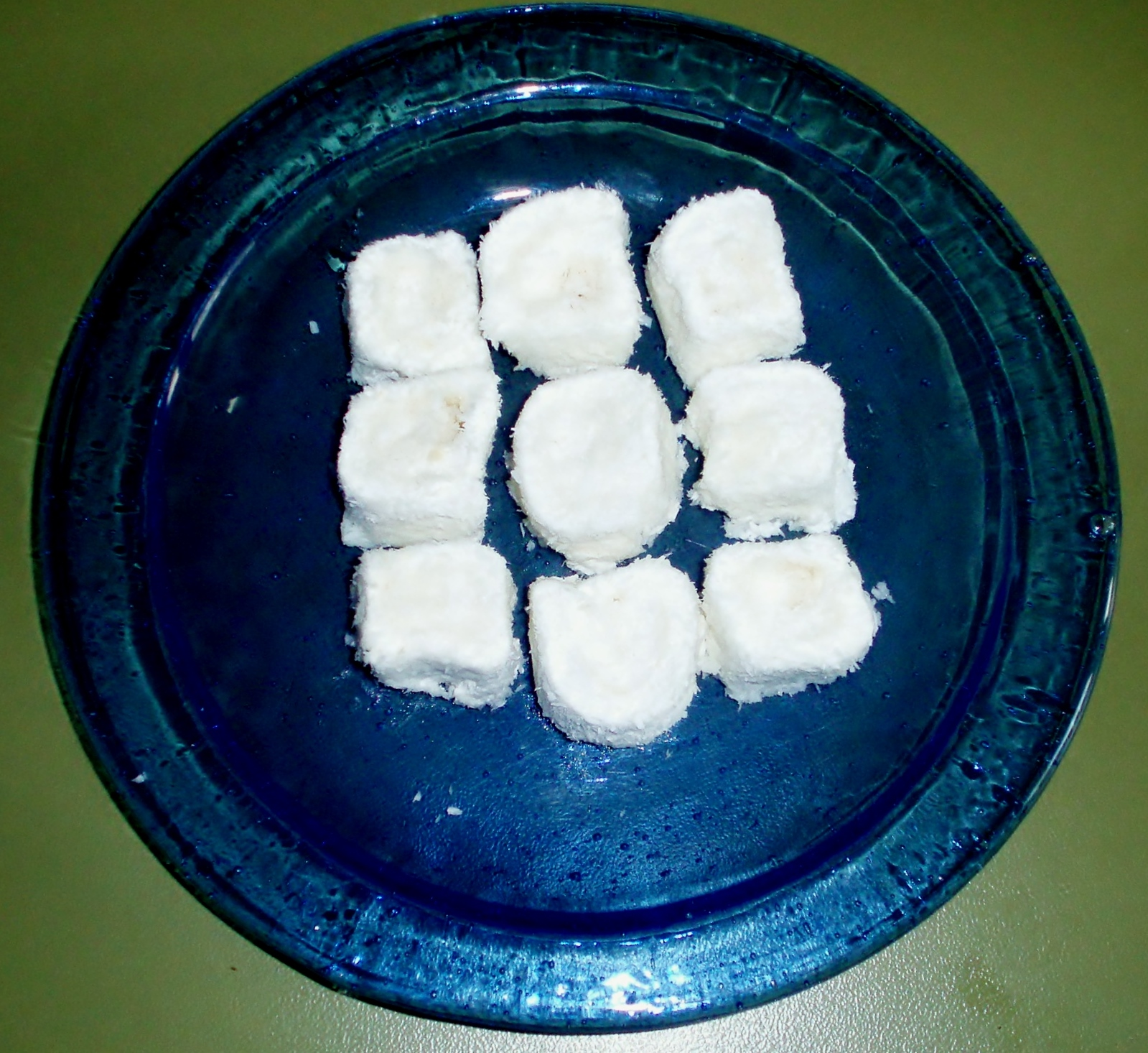
Kaymak lokum, Turkish delight of cream, a speciality of Afyonkarahisar

=== Sweets ===
- local cream kaymak eaten with honey, with a bread pudding ekmek kadayıfı, or with pumpkin simmered in syrup
- Turkish delight
- helva - sweetened ground sesame

== Main sights ==
- Afyonkarahisar Castle
- Victory Museum (Zafer Müzesi), a national military and war museum, which was used as headquarters by then Commander-in-Chief Mustafa Kemal Pasha (Atatürk), his chief general staff and army commanders before the Great Offensive in August 1922. In the very city center, across the fortress, featuring maps, uniforms, photos, guns from the Greco-Turkish War.
- The partly ruined fortress which has given the city its name. To reach at the top, eight hundred stairs need to be climbed.
- The Afyonkarahisar Archaeological Museum which houses thousands of Hellenic, Frigian, Hittite, Roman, Ottoman finds.
- Afyon Grand Mosque
- Altıgöz Bridge, like the Ulu Camii built by the Seljuqs in the 13th century.
  Ulu Camii Afyonkarahisar
  Ulu Camii Afyonkarahisar
- Afyon mansion (Afyon konağı) situated on a hill overlooking the panoramic plain.
- the White Elephant - Afyon is twinned with the town of Hamm in Germany, and now has a large statue of Hamm's symbolic white elephant.

With its rich architectural heritage, the city is a member of the European Association of Historic Towns and Regions.

Table of population over years
Year	1914	1990	1995	2000
Population	285,750	95,643	103,000	128,516

== Twin towns – sister cities ==
- Nyíregyháza, Hungary, since 1992
- Athens, Greece, since 1999
- Turkistan, Kazakhstan
- Hamm, Germany, since 2005
- Peja, Kosovo, since 2008
- Yunfu, China, since 2007
- Latakia, Syria, since 2009
- Valpovo, Croatia, since 2025

== Notable natives ==
The following list is alphabetically sorted by family name.

- İlker Başbuğ (born 1943), former chief of the General Staff of Turkey
- Ali Çetinkaya (1879–1949), Ottoman Army officer and Turkish politician
- Fikret Emek (born 1963), retired military personnel of the Special Forces Command
- Veysel Eroğlu (born 1948), Turkish politician
- Bülent İplikçioğlu (born 1952), historian
- Ahmed Karahisari (1468–1566), Ottoman calligrapher
- Mihran Mesrobian (1889–1975), architect and decorated Ottoman soldier
- Gülcan Mıngır (born 1989), middle-distance runner
- Sibel Özkan (born 1988), Olympic medalist weightlifter
- Ahmet Necdet Sezer (born 1941), former president of Turkey
- Gunay Uslu (born 1972), Dutch cultural historian and politician
- Nurgül Yeşilçay (born 1976), actress

== See also ==
- 2012 Afyonkarahisar arsenal explosion
