= 2012 Afyonkarahisar arsenal explosion =

Fatal accident in Turkey

Afyonkarahisar arsenal explosion
- Date: 5 September 2012
- Time: 21:15 EEST
- Location: Afyonkarahisar, Turkey; 38°43′40.47″N 30°32′28.08″E
- Deaths: 25 servicemen
- Injuries: 4 servicemen and 3 civilians

Location of Afyonkarahisar in Turkey

The 2012 Afyonkarahisar arsenal explosion occurred at 21:15 local time on 5 September 2012 in Afyonkarahisar, Turkey. According to Turkish Armed Forces, 25 servicemen died, four other soldiers and three civilians were injured by the accident.

A fire at the locality followed the explosion. The remains of two noncommissioned officers, two special sergeants and 21 privates were recovered after the fire was extinguished.

The explosion occurred during classification works in the depot. Ammunition was transported from a depot of the 44th Ammunition Company in Susurluk, Balıkesir to Afyonkarahisar by train, and from the train station in the city to the facility by civilian trucks. The arsenal commander ordered the completion of tally and classification works before a scheduled official inspection in ten days time. For that reason, works in the depot continued in the night although any work in the arsenal depots is not allowed in the darkness due to lack of lighting in those facilities. During the accident time, the depot's inside was being illuminated by the light beam from the headlamps of a truck parked before the depot gate, by flashlights and possibly by lighters.

The source of the explosion was thought to be a grenade detonating, setting off a chain reaction. The prime minister announced that four commanders of the facility were removed from their post and appointed to other military units.

The depot no. 32, at which the explosion took place, was within the 41st Ammunition Company of the 4th Munition Division at the 500th Arsenal Command of the Turkish Army Corps of Engineers. The officers stationed at the site told during the hearing before the military prosecutor that 248 tonnes hand grenades and 360 tonnes 175 mm (6.9 in) ammunition were tried to be piled in two depots instead of in five depots as required. The investigation was carried out by a military prosecutor from the 1st Tactical Air Force Command in Eskişehir, which is in command of the facility in Afyonkarahisar. The military court ruled the detention of a major, and the trial of two other officers in the rank of a colonel and a first lieutenant without arrest. The major is accused of involuntary manslaughter. The military prosecutor stated that no evidence could be found showing that the explosion was a result of terrorism or sabotage.
