= Gedikli =

Gedikli may refer to:

- Gedikli, Feke, Adana Province, Turkey
- Gedikli, Gölbaşı, Adıyaman Province, Turkey
- Gedikli, Haymana, Ankara Province, Turkey
- Gedikli, Kozan, Adana Province, Turkey
- Gedikli, Polatlı, Ankara Province, Turkey
- Zarkadia, Kavala, Greece
