= Bahçecik =

Bahçecik (literally "little garden") is a Turkish place name that may refer to the following places in Turkey:

- Bahçecik, Bilecik, a town in Bilecik Province
- Bahçecik, Feke, a village in the district of Feke, Adana Province
- Bahçecik, Haymana, a village in the district of Haymana, Ankara Province
- Bahçecik, İscehisar, a village in the district of İscehisar, Afyonkarahisar Province
- Bahçecik, Karakoçan
- Bahçecik, Kocaeli (formerly Bardizag), a village near İzmit
- Bahçecik, Merzifon, a village in the district of Merzifon, Amasya Province
- Bahçecik, Oltu
- Bahçecik, Ulus, a village in the district of Ulus, Bartın Province
- Bahçecik, Sur, a village in the district of Sur, Diyarbakır Province
