= Carranque =

- Municipality
- Coat of arms

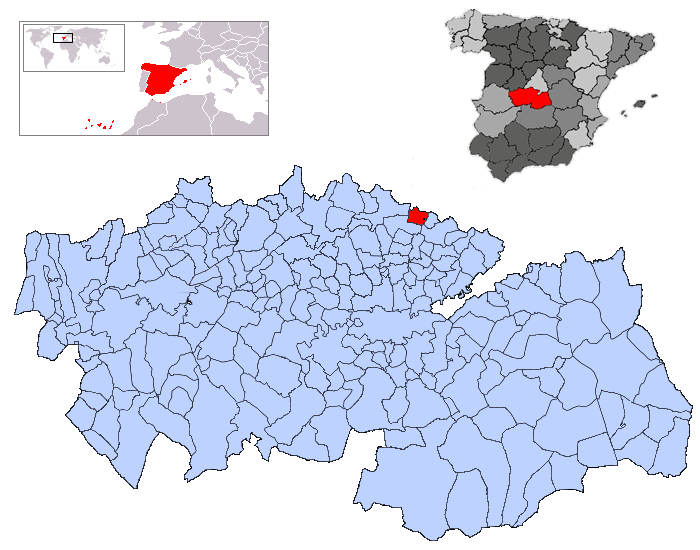

- Location in Spain
- Coordinates: 40°10′15″N 3°53′49″W
- Country: Spain
- Autonomous community: Castile-La Mancha
- Province: Toledo
- Comarca: La Sagra
- Judicial district: Illescas
- Founded: Ver texto

Government
  - Alcalde: Alejandro Pompa de Mingo (2007)

Area
  - Total: 25 km^{2} (9.7 sq mi)
- Elevation: 665 m (2,182 ft)

Population (2025-01-01)
  - Total: 5,469
  - Density: 220/km^{2} (570/sq mi)
- Demonym(s): Carranqueño, ña
- Time zone: UTC+1 (CET)
  - Summer (DST): UTC+2 (CEST)
- Postal code: 45216
- Dialing code: 925
- Website: Official website

Carranque is a town in the Toledo province, Castile-La Mancha, Spain. It is located in the area of the province bordering the province of Madrid called the Alta Sagra.

== Archeological park ==
Carranque contains the site of a Roman villa that is protected as an archeological park by the Castile-La Mancha government. There are three main buildings visible by above-ground remains, the ruins of a Roman mill and a modern interpretation building.

It is located by the River Guadarrama, near a Roman road. It seems to be near the lost city of Titultiam.

In 1983 a local peasant, Samuel López Iglesias, found a series of mosaic floors while plowing in the fields known as las Suertes de Abajo.

The buildings date from the late fourth century and are thought to belong to a "Villa of Maternus Cinigius", the uncle of Theodosius I, Roman emperor, born in Hispania, but presently the owner is still unknown.

The interpretation facility exhibits objects found during the excavations.

=== Buildings ===
==== Building A: Basilica ====
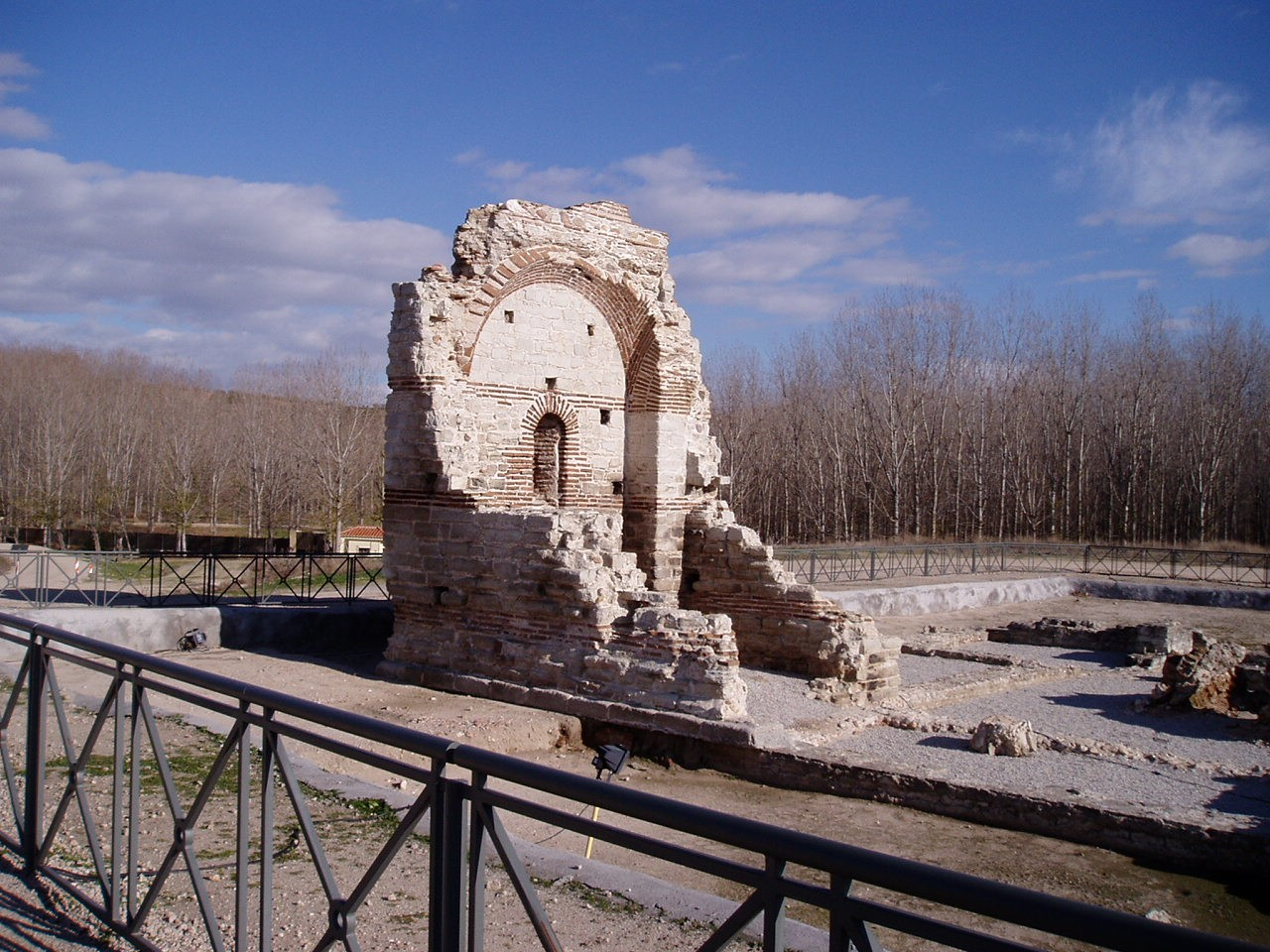
Head of the Basilica.

A Theodosian-era building that takes as models the governors' palaces. The hall was surrounded with 32 monolithic marble columns from the emperor's private quarries in Chios in Greece (known as or chium) and Iscehisar and Afyon in Anatolia (phygium or pavonazzeto marble). Soon it was converted for use in Christian cult and burials. The Visigothic arrival brought some changes. It was also used during the Islamic age. The Knights Templar used it as an abbey or monastery.

It appears as the hermitage of Santa María de Batres in the Relaciones de Felipe II (1576), with most of the area used as a cemetery. It was used as such until the 17th century. The head of the Roman building, as the hermitage of Santa María de Abajo ("Saint Mary of the lower side"), lasted until around 1920 when it was dynamited to serve as construction material for the modern town.

Its decoration shows the power of the patron. There were plates of marble, red porphyry, and green serpentinite, wall painting, opus sectile and mosaics with glass and golden-leaf tiles.

Anecdotally, the footprints of a caliga and a dog paw are visible on the mortar.

The floorplan, part of the head (the chapel) and some columns are now visible.

==== Building B: nympheum ====
Only remains of the floorplan were found.

Its location (a little knoll over the river) offers an interpretation as a monumental cistern with a fountain. Its shape reminds of a nymphaeum. It was built with opus caementicium (stone and mortar) and opus testaceum (brick). Mosaics covered the floor.

==== Building C: Villa of Maternus ====
Remains of the Roman villa were the first found. The villa was built in the Theodosian era over earlier production facilities of an agricultural villa. The slope was compensated with a terraced construction over around 1,200 m^{2} It is shaped around a peristylum patio.

The hypocaust under-floor heating and running water indicate the owner's wealth; which is further reflected in the mosaics, assembled by at least three workshops, two of which signed their work.

Other rooms are covered with opus signinum (chalk and crushed bricks).

=== Mosaics ===
==== Sleeping room of Maternus ====
The cubiculum has a mosaic text in which the worker wishes Maternus prosperity. This Maternus is thought to be Maternus Cinigius, uncle of the emperor Theodosius. The mosaics depict:

- Portraits of Athena, Hercules and Diana.
- the kidnapping of Hylas by the Nymphs.
- Acteon and the bath of Diana.
- Pyramus and Thisbe
- Amymone and Neptune

==== Meeting room ====
The oecus, where the owner held meetings and banquets showing off his social status, was ended by a raised exedra. The mosaic depicts the death of Adonis. Two dogs named Leander and Titurus are also represented.

==== Dining hall ====
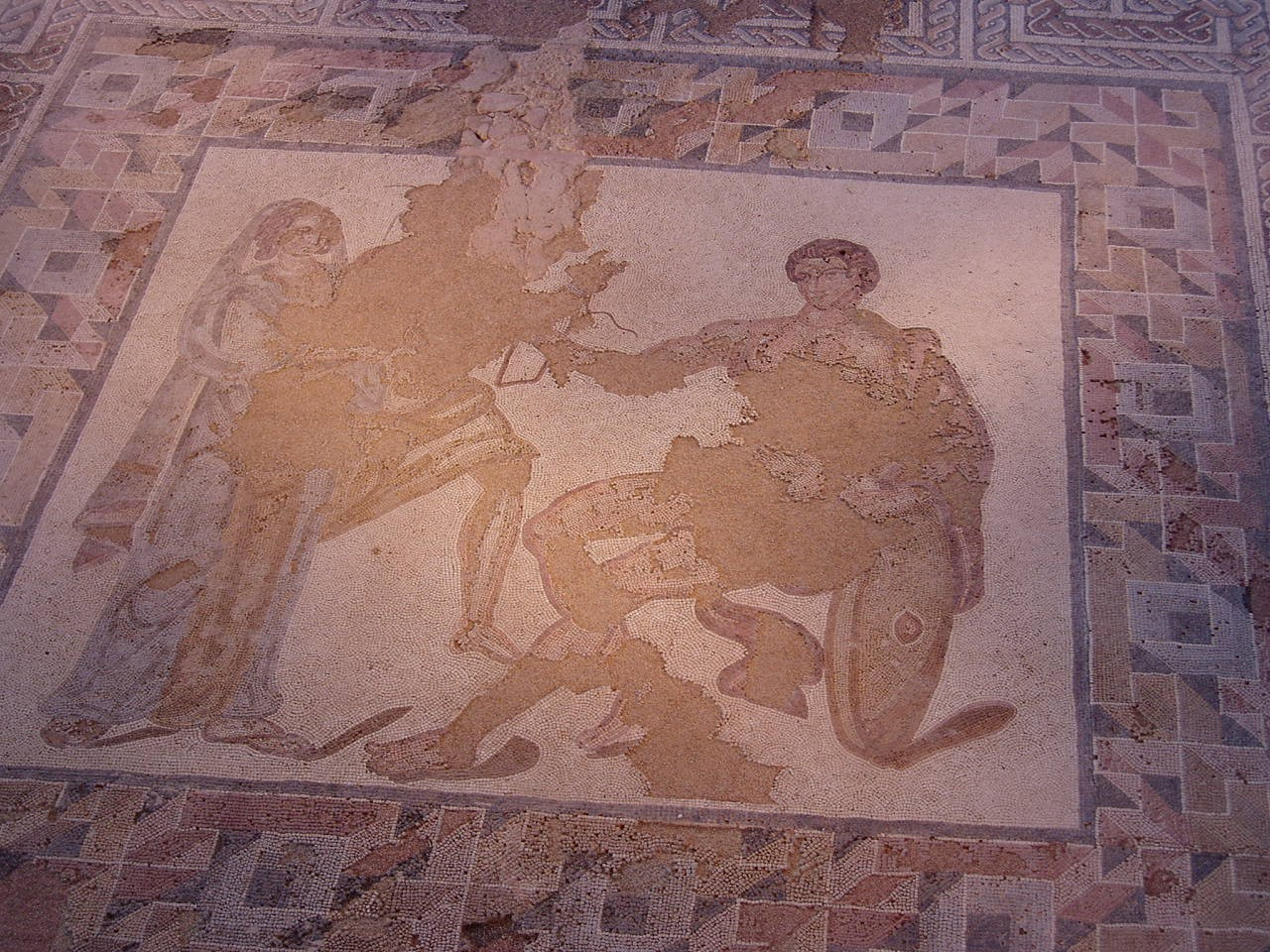
Briseis and Achilles.

The hypocaust of the triclinium was complemented by ceramic tubes in the walls that pulled the hot air upwards. The mosaic depicts the gift of the slave Briseis to Achilles as narrated in the Iliad.

A sloped floor formed a semicircular wall fountain with a mosaic of the god Oceanus, featuring crab antennas and claws and a wavy beard. The water effect was completed by blue-glass windows.
