= Kırıkuşağı, Feke =

Kırıkuşağı
- Neighbourhood
- Location in Turkey
- Coordinates: 37°48′N 35°59′E
- Country: Turkey
- Province: Adana
- District: Feke
- Population (2022): 407
- Time zone: UTC+3 (TRT)

Kırıkuşağı is a neighbourhood in the municipality and district of Feke, Adana Province, Turkey. Its population is 407 (2022). The village inhabited by Turkmens of the Varsak tribe.
