= Şahmuratlı, Feke =

Şahmuratlı
- Neighbourhood
- Location in Turkey
- Coordinates: 37.9260°N 35.6129°E
- Country: Turkey
- Province: Adana
- District: Feke
- Population (2022): 377
- Time zone: UTC+3 (TRT)

Şahmuratlı is a neighbourhood in the municipality and district of Feke, Adana Province, Turkey. Its population is 377 (2022). The village inhabited by Turkmens of the Varsak tribe.
