= Akoluk, Feke =

Akoluk
- Neighbourhood
- Location in Turkey
- Coordinates: 37.7772°N 36.0153°E
- Country: Turkey
- Province: Adana
- District: Feke
- Population (2022): 283
- Time zone: UTC+3 (TRT)

Akoluk is a neighbourhood in the municipality and district of Feke, Adana Province, Turkey. Its population is 283 (2022). The village inhabited by Turkmens of the Varsak tribe.
