= Gürümze, Feke =

Gürümze
- Neighbourhood
- Location within Turkey
- Coordinates: 37°59′N 35°48′E
- Country: Turkey
- Province: Adana
- District: Feke
- Population (2022): 625
- Time zone: UTC+3 (TRT)

Gürümze is a neighbourhood in the municipality and district of Feke, Adana Province, Turkey. Its population is 625 (2022). The village inhabited by Turkmens of the Varsak tribe.

In a massacre variously dated between 1922 and 1923, at the end of the Greek genocide, 60–200 Greek residents of the village were murdered. The victims were both Orthodox Christians and Protestant Christians, who were ordered to gather outside the local church and surrender their valuables before being locked inside. The church was then set ablaze; those who tried to escape were killed with scimitars. Among the dead were three priests.
