= Kızılyer =

Kızılyer can refer to:

- Kızılyer, Feke
- Kızılyer, Honaz
