= Çatağıl =

Çatağıl can refer to:

- Çatağıl, Burdur
- Çatağıl, İscehisar
