= Paşalı, Feke =

Paşalı
- Neighbourhood
- Location in Turkey
- Coordinates: 37.7833°N 36.0333°E
- Country: Turkey
- Province: Adana
- District: Feke
- Population (2022): 999
- Time zone: UTC+3 (TRT)

Paşalı is a neighbourhood in the municipality and district of Feke, Adana Province, Turkey. Its population is 999 (2022). The village inhabited by Turkmens of the Varsak tribe.
