= Koçyazı =

Koçyazı may refer to one of the following places:

- Koçyazı, Feke, Adana Province, Turkey
- Koçyazı, Yunak, Konya Province, Turkey
- Koçyazı, Düzce, Düzce Province, Turkey
