= Kocagöl =

Kocagöl can refer to the following villages in Turkey:

- Kocagöl, Hocalar
- Kocagöl, Manyas
