= CD Carranque =

Spanish football team

Carranque
- Full name: Club Deportivo Carranque
- Founded: 1986
- Dissolved: 2013
- Ground: Estadio Municipal, Carranque, Castilla-La Mancha, Spain
- Capacity: 1,000
- Chairman: (Spain) Inocente Martínez
- Manager: (Spain) César Martín
- 2012–13: Primera Autonómica Preferente – Group 2, 14th of 18
Home colours

Club Deportivo Carranque is a football team based in Carranque in the autonomous community of Castilla-La Mancha. Founded in 1986 and dissolved in 2013, they last played in the Primera Autonómica Preferente – Group 2. Its stadium is Estadio Municipal with a capacity of 1,000 seats.

== Season to season ==
Season	Tier	Division	Place	Copa del Rey
1986–87	7	2ª Reg.	6th	
1987–88	7	2ª Reg.	3rd	
1988–89	6	1ª Reg.	10th	
1989–90	7	2ª Reg.	9th	
1990–91	7	2ª Reg.	1st	
1991–92	6	1ª Reg.	2nd	
1992–93	6	1ª Reg.	15th	
1993–94	7	2ª Reg.	7th	
1994–95	7	2ª Reg.	1st	
1995–96	6	2ª Aut.	3rd	
1996–97	DNP			
1997–98	DNP			
1998–99	DNP			
1999–2000	6	2ª Aut.	5th	

Season	Tier	Division	Place	Copa del Rey
2000–01	6	2ª Aut.	3rd	
2001–02	6	2ª Aut.	3rd	
2002–03	6	2ª Aut.	12th	
2003–04	6	2ª Aut.	4th	
2004–05	6	2ª Aut.	2nd	
2005–06	6	2ª Aut.	3rd	
2006–07	6	2ª Aut.	6th	
2007–08	6	1ª Aut.	1st	
2008–09	5	Aut. Pref.	1st	
2009–10	4	3ª	10th	
2010–11	4	3ª	16th	
2011–12	4	3ª	19th	
2012–13	5	Aut. Pref.	14th	

- 3 season in Tercera División
