= Süphandere, Feke =

Süphandere
- Neighbourhood
- Location in Turkey
- Coordinates: 37°56′N 35°51′E
- Country: Turkey
- Province: Adana
- District: Feke
- Population (2022): 392
- Time zone: UTC+3 (TRT)

Süphandere is a neighbourhood in the municipality and district of Feke, Adana Province, Turkey. Its population is 392 (2022). The village inhabited by Turkmens of the Varsak tribe.
