= Kayadibi, Feke =

Kayadibi
- Neighbourhood
- Location in Turkey
- Coordinates: 37°46′26″N 35°46′29″E
- Country: Turkey
- Province: Adana
- District: Feke
- Population (2022): 112
- Time zone: UTC+3 (TRT)

Kayadibi is a neighbourhood in the municipality and district of Feke, Adana Province, Turkey. Its population is 112 (2022). The village inhabited by Turkmens of the Varsak tribe.
