= Selimiye, İscehisar =

Selimiye
- Settlement
- Location in Turkey
- Coordinates: 38.98711°N 30.70206°E
- Country: Turkey
- Province: Afyonkarahisar
- District: İscehisar
- Time zone: UTC+3 (TRT)

Selimiye is a settlement in the İscehisar District, Afyonkarahisar Province, Turkey. In 1919 it was called Selimiye but it has also been known as Sarıçayır. By 2007 it was part of the municipality of Alanyurt; in 2012 the population of Selimiye was 179. In 2013 the municipality of Alanyurt was abolished; administratively, Selimiye became part of the village of Alanyurt.

== Places of interest ==
Nearby are the remains of the Byzantine rock-cut İbrahim İnleri Church. Dating to the tenth or eleventh century, the church was probably divided into three aisles by arcades and had painted reliefs on its walls, one likely of the Theotokos Hodegetria.
