= Ormancık =

Ormancık can refer to:

- Ormancık, Anamur
- Ormancık, Feke
- Ormancık, Karakoçan
- Ormancık, Savur
