= Güre =

Güre may refer to:

- Güre, Edremit, a town in the Edremit district of the Balıkesir province in Turkey
- Güre, Hocalar, a village in the District of Hocalar of the Afyonkarahisar Province in Turkey
- Güre, Uşak, a town in the Uşak province in Turkey
