= Doğlat, İscehisar =

Doğlat
- Village
- Location within Turkey Location within Turkey Aegean
- Coordinates: 39°00′N 30°48′E
- Country: Turkey
- Province: Afyonkarahisar
- District: İscehisar
- Population (2021): 174
- Time zone: UTC+3 (TRT)

Doğlat is a village in the İscehisar District, Afyonkarahisar Province, Turkey. Its population is 174 (2021).

It is 48 km to the center of Afyonkarahisar and 26 km to the town of Iscehisar and the village has a warm continental climate.

The economy of a village depends on agriculture and husbandry. The village has a primary school and does not have a drinking water, but there is a sewerage network, and the village has electricity and fixed telephone.

== History ==
Some researchers believe that ancient city of Dioclea (Greek: Διόκλεια Φρυγίας) was located near modern Doğlat, while others assume that it was located near Ahırhisar (modern Yeşilhisar). The village was founded in 1901 by the Karachayns who emigrated from the Caucasus.
