= Olucak, Feke =

Olucak
- Neighbourhood
- Location in Turkey
- Coordinates: 37.8634°N 35.8810°E
- Country: Turkey
- Province: Adana
- District: Feke
- Population (2022): 208
- Time zone: UTC+3 (TRT)

Olucak is a neighbourhood in the municipality and district of Feke, Adana Province, Turkey. Its population is 208 (2022). The village inhabited by Turkmens of the Varsak tribe.
