= Hıdıruşağı, Feke =

Hıdıruşağı
- Neighbourhood
- Location in Turkey
- Coordinates: 37.8878°N 35.7732°E
- Country: Turkey
- Province: Adana
- District: Feke
- Population (2022): 169
- Time zone: UTC+3 (TRT)

Hıdıruşağı is a neighbourhood in the municipality and district of Feke, Adana Province, Turkey. Its population is 169 (2022). The village is inhabited by Turkmens of the Varsak tribe.
