= İncirci, Feke =

İncirci
- Neighbourhood
- Country: Turkey
- Province: Adana
- District: Feke
- Population (2022): 449
- Time zone: UTC+3 (TRT)

İncirci is a neighbourhood in the municipality and district of Feke, Adana Province, Turkey. Its population is 449 (2022). The village inhabited by Turkmens of the Varsak tribe.
