= Olukpınar =

Olukpınar can refer to:

- Olukpınar, Kemah
- Olukpınar, İscehisar
- Olukpınar, Polatlı
