= Bağdatlı, Feke =

Bağdatlı
- Neighbourhood
- Location in Turkey
- Coordinates: 37.9011°N 35.8508°E
- Country: Turkey
- Province: Adana
- District: Feke
- Population (2022): 111
- Time zone: UTC+3 (TRT)

Bağdatlı is a neighbourhood in the municipality and district of Feke, Adana Province, Turkey. Its population is 111 (2022). The village inhabited by Turkmens of the Varsak tribe.
