= Akkaya, Feke =

Akkaya
- Neighbourhood
- Location in Turkey
- Coordinates: 37.7583°N 35.8937°E
- Country: Turkey
- Province: Adana
- District: Feke
- Population (2022): 303
- Time zone: UTC+3 (TRT)

Akkaya is a neighbourhood in the municipality and district of Feke, Adana Province, Turkey. Its population is 303 (2022). The village inhabited by Turkmens of the Varsak tribe.
