= Yaylapınar, Feke =

Yaylapınar
- Neighbourhood
- Location in Turkey
- Coordinates: 37.8875°N 35.8370°E
- Country: Turkey
- Province: Adana
- District: Feke
- Population (2022): 133
- Time zone: UTC+3 (TRT)

Yaylapınar is a neighbourhood in the municipality and district of Feke, Adana Province, Turkey. Its population is 133 (2022). The village inhabited by Turkmens of the Varsak tribe.
