= Kaleyüzü, Feke =

Kaleyüzü
- Neighbourhood
- Location in Turkey
- Coordinates: 37°50′N 35°43′E
- Country: Turkey
- Province: Adana
- District: Feke
- Population (2022): 320
- Time zone: UTC+3 (TRT)

Kaleyüzü is a neighbourhood in the municipality and district of Feke, Adana Province, Turkey. Its population is 320 (2022). The village inhabited by Turkmens of the Varsak tribe.
