= Değirmenciuşağı, Feke =

Değirmenciuşağı
- Neighbourhood
- Location in Turkey
- Coordinates: 37.8195°N 35.7642°E
- Country: Turkey
- Province: Adana
- District: Feke
- Population (2022): 80
- Time zone: UTC+3 (TRT)

Değirmenciuşağı is a neighbourhood in the municipality and district of Feke, Adana Province, Turkey. Its population is 80 (2022).
