= Akçadere, Hocalar =

Akçadere
- Village
- Location within Turkey Location within Turkey Aegean
- Coordinates: 38.6278°N 29.9840°E
- Country: Turkey
- Province: Afyonkarahisar
- District: Hocalar
- Population (2021): 627
- Time zone: UTC+3 (TRT)

Akçadere is a village in the Hocalar District, Afyonkarahisar Province, Turkey. Its population is 627 (2021).
