= Gedikli, Feke =

Gedikli
- Neighbourhood
- Location in Turkey
- Coordinates: 38.0167°N 35.9167°E
- Country: Turkey
- Province: Adana
- District: Feke
- Population (2022): 553
- Time zone: UTC+3 (TRT)

Gedikli is a neighbourhood in the municipality and district of Feke, Adana Province, Turkey. Its population is 553 (2022). The village inhabited by Turkmens of the Varsak tribe.
