= Hocalar District =

- District
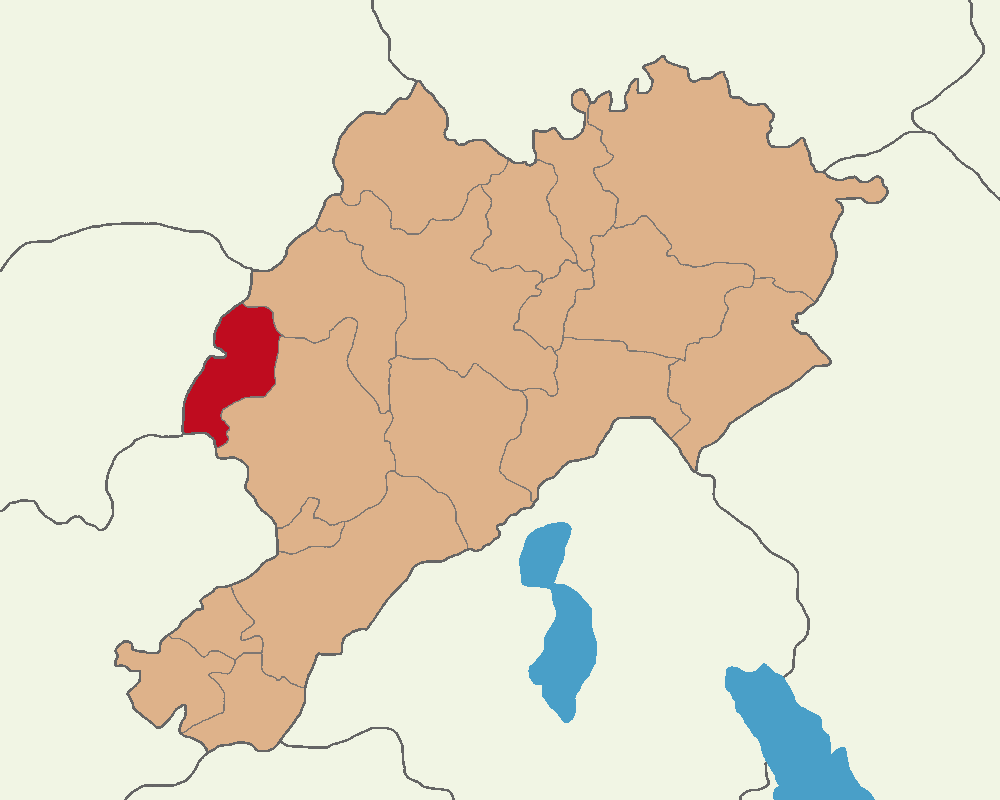
- Map showing Hocalar District in Afyonkarahisar Province

- Location in Turkey Hocalar District (Turkey Aegean)
- Coordinates: 38°34′N 30°00′E
- Country: Turkey
- Province: Afyonkarahisar
- Seat: Hocalar
- Area: 506 km^{2} (195 sq mi)
- Population (2021): 9,035
  - Density: 17.9/km^{2} (46.2/sq mi)
- Time zone: UTC+3 (TRT)

Hocalar District is a district of Afyonkarahisar Province of Turkey. Its seat is the town Hocalar. Its area is 506 km^{2}, and its population is 9,035 (2021).

== Composition ==
There is one municipality in Hocalar District:

- Hocalar

There are 15 villages in Hocalar District:

- Akçadere
- Avgancık
- Çalca
- Çepni
- Davulga
- Devlethan
- Güre
- İhsaniye
- Kocagöl
- Kozluca
- Örencik
- Örtülü
- Uluköy
- Yağcı
- Yeşilhisar
