= Çalca, Hocalar =

Çalca
- Village
- Location within Turkey Location within Turkey Aegean
- Coordinates: 38.6728°N 29.9758°E
- Country: Turkey
- Province: Afyonkarahisar
- District: Hocalar
- Population (2021): 611
- Time zone: UTC+3 (TRT)

Çalca is a village in the Hocalar District, Afyonkarahisar Province, Turkey. Its population is 611 (2021).
