= Yeşilhisar, Hocalar =

Yeşilhisar
- Village
- Location within Turkey Location within Turkey Aegean
- Coordinates: 38.6750°N 29.9372°E
- Country: Turkey
- Province: Afyonkarahisar
- District: Hocalar
- Elevation: 1,000 m (3,300 ft)
- Population (2021): 1,514
- Time zone: UTC+3 (TRT)
- Postal code: 03580

Yeşilhisar is a village in the Hocalar District, Afyonkarahisar Province, Turkey. Its population is 1,514 (2021). Before the 2013 reorganisation, it was a town (belde). The postal code for the village is 03580.

== Geography ==
Yeşilhisar is located on the southwest flank of the Ahır Dağ, 84 km south of Kütahya. The village is located at the western end of the Karahisar Plain and has a continental climate, hot and dry summers, cold and snowy winters. Rainfall is generally sparse. The economy is mainly agriculture accounting for about 60% to 75% of the population with crops including Apples, apricots and Sugar beet and potato are the most important industrial plants.

== History ==
The ancient city of Dioclea (Greek: Διόκλεια Φρυγίας) was located near modern Yeşilhisar (formerly called Ahırhisar), while some assume that it was located near modern Doğlat. Traces of the ancient settlement at Yeşilhisar include a few old inscriptions and a capital dated to the early Byzantine period.
