= Davulga, Hocalar =

Davulga
- Village
- Location within Turkey Location within Turkey Aegean
- Coordinates: 38.5781°N 29.8889°E
- Country: Turkey
- Province: Afyonkarahisar
- District: Hocalar
- Population (2021): 557
- Time zone: UTC+3 (TRT)

Davulga is a village in the Hocalar District, Afyonkarahisar Province, Turkey. Its population is 557 (2021).
