= Ortaköy, Feke =

Ortaköy
- Neighbourhood
- Location in Turkey
- Coordinates: 37.7951°N 35.6865°E
- Country: Turkey
- Province: Adana
- District: Feke
- Population (2022): 148
- Time zone: UTC+3 (TRT)

Ortaköy is a neighbourhood in the municipality and district of Feke, Adana Province, Turkey. Its population is 148 (2022).
