= Konarı, İscehisar =

Konarı
- Village
- Location within Turkey Location within Turkey Aegean
- Coordinates: 38.8592°N 30.8578°E
- Country: Turkey
- Province: Afyonkarahisar
- District: İscehisar
- Population (2021): 993
- Time zone: UTC+3 (TRT)

Konarı' is a village in the İscehisar District, Afyonkarahisar Province, Turkey. Its population is 993 (2021).
