= Yağcı, Hocalar =

Yağcı
- Village
- Location within Turkey Location within Turkey Aegean
- Coordinates: 38.6756°N 30.0272°E
- Country: Turkey
- Province: Afyonkarahisar
- District: Hocalar
- Population (2021): 196
- Time zone: UTC+3 (TRT)

Yağcı is a village in the Hocalar District, Afyonkarahisar Province, Turkey. Its population is 196 (2021).
