= Çepni, Hocalar =

Çepni
- Village
- Location within Turkey Location within Turkey Aegean
- Coordinates: 38.6058°N 30.0306°E
- Country: Turkey
- Province: Afyonkarahisar
- District: Hocalar
- Population (2021): 676
- Time zone: UTC+3 (TRT)

Çepni is a village in the Hocalar District, Afyonkarahisar Province, Turkey. Its population is 676 (2021).
