= Docimium =

Ancient city in Phrygia

Coordinates: 38°52′N 30°45′E

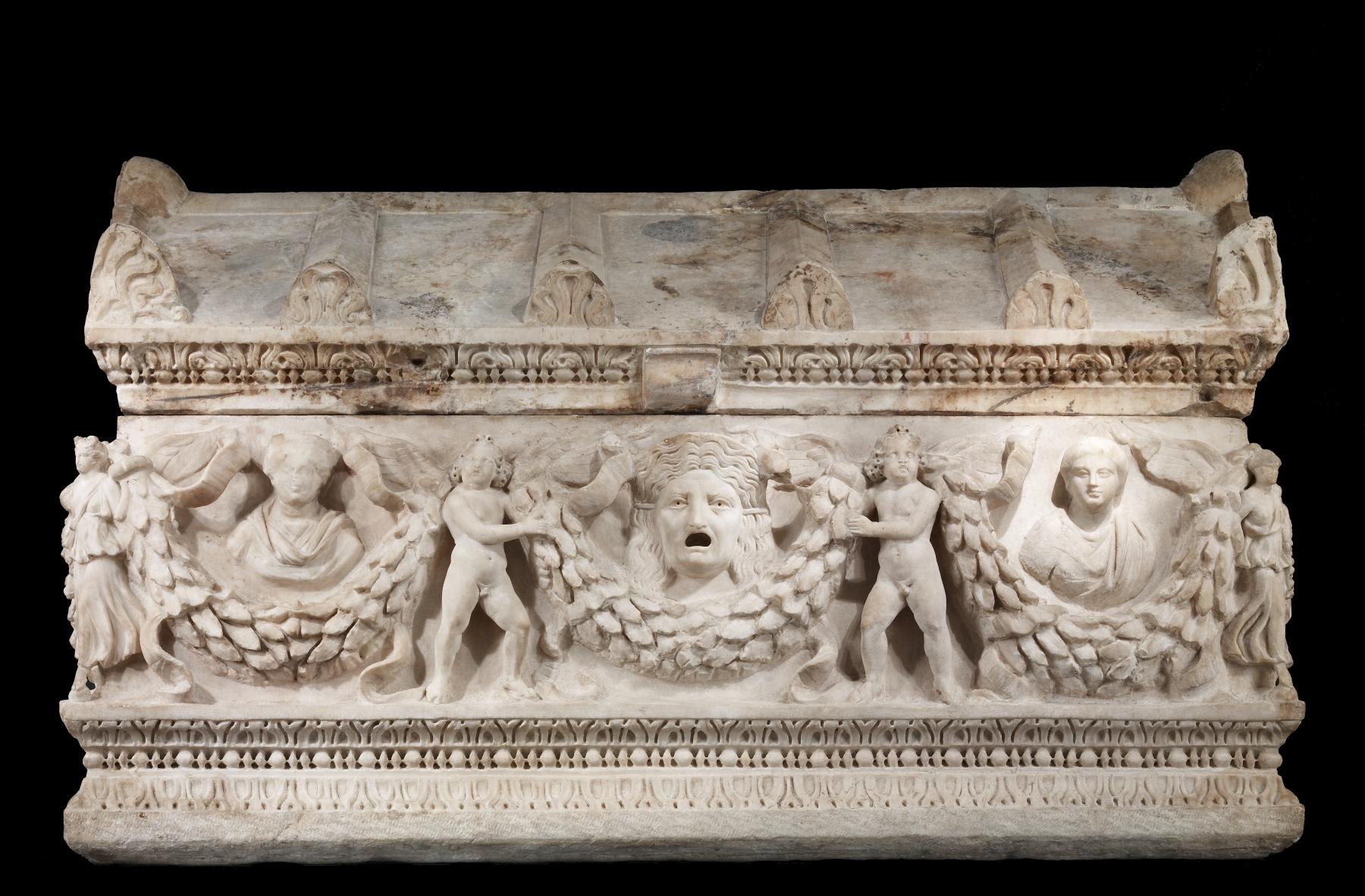
Sarcophagus dated between 150 and 180 in Dokimeion marble

Docimium, Docimia or Docimeium (Greek: Δοκίμια and Δοκίμειον) was an ancient city of Phrygia, Asia Minor where there were famous marble quarries. The exact site of Docimium was a matter of some dispute until recently; it is now fixed at the modern Turkish town İscehisar, in Afyonkarahisar Province.

== History ==
This city, as appears from its coins – which bear the epigraph Δημος or Ιερα Συνκλητος Δοκιμεων Μακεδονεν – where the inhabitants are called Macedonians, may have been founded by Antigonos Dokimos. The city's name in Greek is Romanized as Dokimeion, Dokimia Kome, Dokimaion, and later Dokimion.

Strabo places Docimium somewhere about Synnada: he calls it a village, and says that there is there a quarry of Synnadic stone, as the Romans call it, but the people of the country call it Docimites and Docimaea; the quarry at first yielded only small pieces of the stone, but owing to the later efforts of the Romans large columns of one piece are taken out, which in variety come near the Alabastrites, so that, though the transport to the sea of such weights is troublesome, still both columns and slabs were brought to Rome of wondrous size and beauty. The word Docimaea (Δοκιμαίαν) in this passage of Strabo appears to be corrupt. It should be either Δοκιμαῖον or Δοκιμέα. Strabo says that the plain of Synnada is about 60 stadia long, and beyond it is Docimium. The Catholic Encyclopedia infers from this that he supposed Docimium to be not far from the limit of the plain. The Table makes it 32 M. P. between Synnada and Docimium, and Docimium is on the road from Synnada to Dorylaeum; but the number is certainly erroneous.

Docimium was the most important marble quarry and workshop for sarcophagi until around the late third century when the production of the famous columnar sarcophagi ended.

== Episcopal see ==
Many Christian inscriptions have been found at this site, dating to the time after Constantine.

Docimium was a suffragan of Synnada in Phrygia Salutaris. Six or seven bishops are known, from 344 to 879 (Lequien, Oriens Christianus, I, 853); another bishop is mentioned in an inscription. Docimium is included in the Catholic Church's list of titular sees.

== Docimaean Marble ==
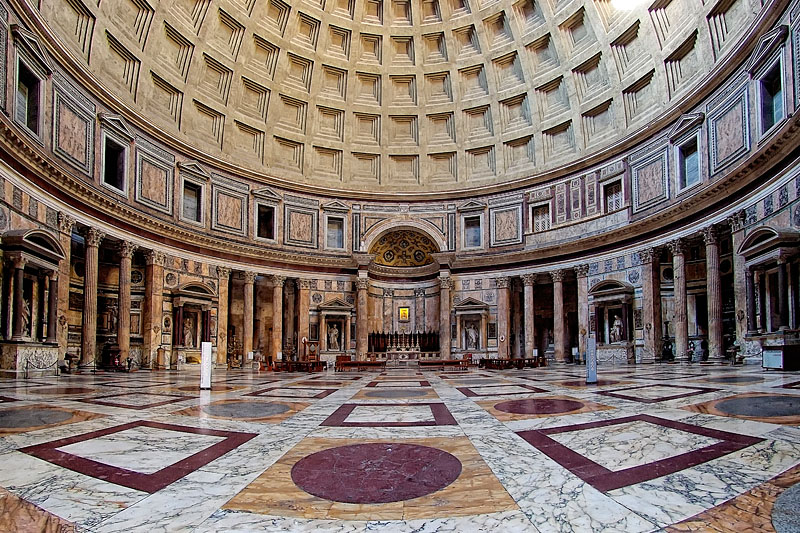
Pantheon, Rome. White Docimaean marble is used on the floor and some of the columns such as the two protruding columns of the main apse. The white Docimaean color on the floor is very dominant.

Historically marble from Docimium was generally referred to as "Docimeaen marble" or "Synnadic marble". Docimaean marble was highly admired and valued for its unique colors and fine grained quality by ancient people such as the Romans. When the Romans took control over Docimaean quarries, they were impressed by the beautiful color combinations of Docimaean Pavonazzetto, which is a type of white marble with purple veins. These colours which streaked the white marble, taken from the city's holy mountain, were attributed to the drops of blood from the dying god Attis. Emperors such as Augustus, Trajan and Hadrian made extensive use of Docimaean marble to many of their major building projects. These include the Pantheon, Trajan's Forum and the Basilica Aemilia (see the main article on Pavonazzo marble for a list of buildings including Docimaean marble).
