= Kozluca, Hocalar =

Kozluca
- Village
- Location within Turkey Location within Turkey Aegean
- Coordinates: 38.6104°N 29.9925°E
- Country: Turkey
- Province: Afyonkarahisar
- District: Hocalar
- Population (2021): 253
- Time zone: UTC+3 (TRT)

Kozluca is a village in the Hocalar District, Afyonkarahisar Province, Turkey. Its population is 253 (2021).
