= Bahçecik, Feke =

Bahçecik
- Neighbourhood
- Location in Turkey
- Coordinates: 37.9842°N 35.7376°E
- Country: Turkey
- Province: Adana
- District: Feke
- Population (2022): 335
- Time zone: UTC+3 (TRT)

Bahçecik, Feke is a neighbourhood in the municipality and district of Feke, Adana Province, Turkey. Its population is 335 (2022). The village is inhabited by Turkmens of the Varsak tribe.
