= Uluköy, Hocalar =

Uluköy
- Village
- Location within Turkey Location within Turkey Aegean
- Coordinates: 38.6914°N 30.0153°E
- Country: Turkey
- Province: Afyonkarahisar
- District: Hocalar
- Population (2021): 413
- Time zone: UTC+3 (TRT)

Uluköy is a village in the Hocalar District, Afyonkarahisar Province, Turkey. Its population is 413 (2021).
