= Alanyurt, İscehisar =

Alanyurt
- Village
- Location within Turkey Location within Turkey Aegean
- Coordinates: 39.0011°N 30.7450°E
- Country: Turkey
- Province: Afyonkarahisar
- District: İscehisar
- Population (2021): 954
- Time zone: UTC+3 (TRT)

Alanyurt is a village in the İscehisar District, Afyonkarahisar Province, Turkey. Its population is 954 (2021). Before the 2013 reorganisation, it was a town (belde). The settlement Selimiye is part of Alanyurt.
