= Kaşaltı, Feke =

Kaşaltı
- Neighbourhood
- Location in Turkey
- Coordinates: 37.7333°N 36.0163°E
- Country: Turkey
- Province: Adana
- District: Feke
- Population (2022): 105
- Time zone: UTC+3 (TRT)

Kaşaltı is a neighbourhood in the municipality and district of Feke, Adana Province, Turkey. Its population is 105 (2022).
