= Çalışlar, İscehisar =

Çalışlar
- Village
- Location within Turkey Location within Turkey Aegean
- Coordinates: 38.8539°N 30.6956°E
- Country: Turkey
- Province: Afyonkarahisar
- District: İscehisar
- Population (2021): 1,766
- Time zone: UTC+3 (TRT)

Çalışlar is a village in the İscehisar District, Afyonkarahisar Province, Turkey. Its population is 1,766 (2021).
