= Gaffaruşağı, Feke =

Gaffaruşağı
- Neighbourhood
- Location in Turkey
- Coordinates: 37°51′N 35°41′E
- Country: Turkey
- Province: Adana
- District: Feke
- Population (2022): 144
- Time zone: UTC+3 (TRT)

Gaffaruşağı is a neighbourhood in the municipality and district of Feke, Adana Province, Turkey. Its population is 144 (2022).
