= Gedikli, Kozan =

Gedikli
- Neighbourhood
- Location in Turkey
- Coordinates: 37°30′43″N 35°52′23″E
- Country: Turkey
- Province: Adana
- District: Kozan
- Population (2022): 489
- Time zone: UTC+3 (TRT)

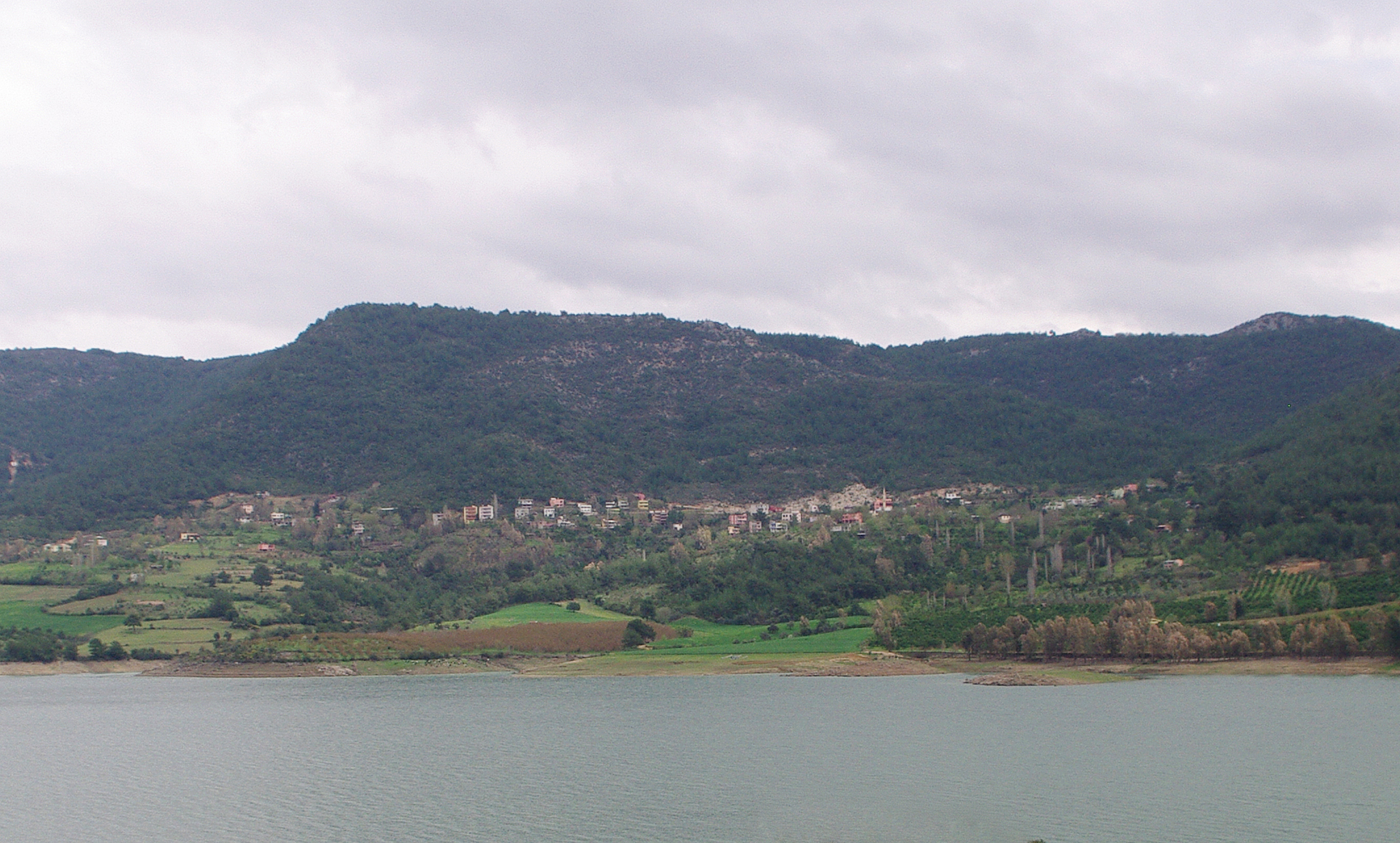

Gedikli is a neighbourhood in the municipality and district of Kozan, Adana Province, Turkey. Its population is 489 (2022). The village inhabited by Turkmens of the Varsak tribe.
