= Doğanlar, İscehisar =

Doğanlar
- Village
- Location within Turkey Location within Turkey Aegean
- Coordinates: 38.9200°N 30.6989°E
- Country: Turkey
- Province: Afyonkarahisar
- District: İscehisar
- Population (2021): 668
- Time zone: UTC+3 (TRT)

Doğanlar is a village in the İscehisar District, Afyonkarahisar Province, Turkey. Its population is 668 (2021).
