= Kovukçınar, Feke =

Kovukçınar
- Neighbourhood
- Location in Turkey
- Coordinates: 37°48′43″N 36°00′25″E
- Country: Turkey
- Province: Adana
- District: Feke
- Population (2022): 267
- Time zone: UTC+3 (TRT)

Kovukçınar is a neighbourhood in the municipality and district of Feke, Adana Province, Turkey. Its population is 267 (2022).
