= Karaağaç, İscehisar =

Karaağaç
- Village
- Location within Turkey Location within Turkey Aegean
- Coordinates: 38.8907°N 30.7322°E
- Country: Turkey
- Province: Afyonkarahisar
- District: İscehisar
- Population (2021): 2,337
- Time zone: UTC+3 (TRT)

Karaağaç is a village in the İscehisar District, Afyonkarahisar Province, Turkey. Its population is 2,337 (2021).
