= Cevizli, İscehisar =

Cevizli
- Village
- Location within Turkey Location within Turkey Aegean
- Coordinates: 38.8463°N 30.885°E
- Country: Turkey
- Province: Afyonkarahisar
- District: İscehisar
- Population (2021): 521
- Time zone: UTC+3 (TRT)

Cevizli is a village in the İscehisar District, Afyonkarahisar Province, Turkey. Its population is 521 (2021).
