= Hocalar =

- Municipality
- Location within Turkey Location within Turkey Aegean
- Coordinates: 38°34′N 30°00′E
- Country: Turkey
- Province: Afyonkarahisar
- District: Hocalar

Government
  - Mayor: Ali Arslan (AKP)
- Population (2021): 2,216
- Time zone: UTC+3 (TRT)
- Climate: Csb

Hocalar is a town of Afyonkarahisar Province in the Aegean region of Turkey. It is the seat of Hocalar District. Its population is 2,216 (2021). The mayor is Ali Arslan (AKP).
