= Feke =

- District and municipality
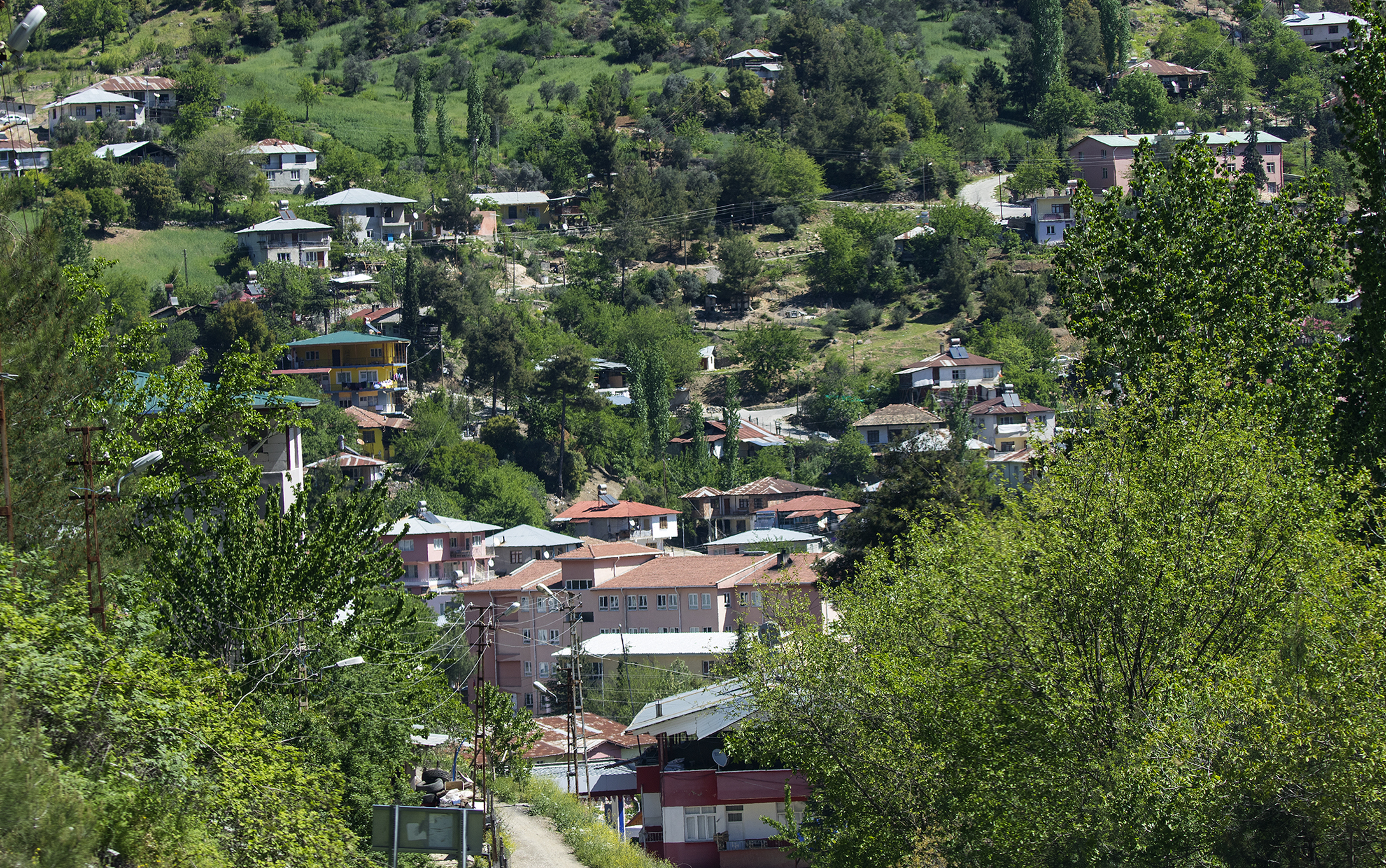

- Map showing Feke District in Adana Province

- Location within Turkey
- Coordinates: 37°48′54″N 35°54′45″E
- Country: Turkey
- Province: Adana

Government
  - Mayor: Cömert Özen (AKP)
- Area: 1,218 km^{2} (470 sq mi)
- Elevation: 620 m (2,030 ft)
- Population (2022): 15,833
  - Density: 13.00/km^{2} (33.67/sq mi)
- Time zone: UTC+3 (TRT)
- Postal code: 01660
- Area code: 0322
- Website: www.feke.bel.tr

Feke (Turkish: [ˈfece]) is a municipality and district of Adana Province, Turkey. Its area is 1,218 km^{2}, and its population is 15,833 (2022). It is 122 km from the city of Adana, 620 m above sea-level, a small town on attractive forested mountainside. The current mayor is Cömert Özen (AKP).

== History ==
The area was settled by the Hittites in the 16th century BC, the Persians in the 6th century BC, conquered by Alexander the Great in 333 BC, and later passed into the hands of the Romans and Byzantines.

Feke commands a pass across the Taurus mountains directly north of Adana, and a castle was first built in the Byzantine period. The name then was Vahka and has since mutated to today's spelling Feke.

Beginning in the 10th century AD the Byzantine government forcibly settled Armenians into Cilicia to act as guards on the frontier with Syria. With the collapse of Byzantine rule in Asia Minor after the Battle of Manzikert it fell upon the Armenians in Cilicia to defend themselves, and in 1097/98 they managed during the reign of Constantine I to capture this castle and rebuild most of the Greek fortifications. It became an important stronghold for the Rubenid barons, who later became the rulers of the Armenian Kingdom of Cilicia. It was captured by the Mameluks and then the Ottomans.

Below the castle are the imposing remains of a two-story early Byzantine church and a late antique/medieval town.

The impressive circuit walls, towers, and vaulted chambers of the castle are positioned at the top of an elongated mountainous outcrop, primarily flanking the more accessible western side. Sheer cliffs precluded the need for defenses at the east. The outer gatehouse, which consists of a winding staircase and an elaborate bent entrance, leads to the summit. Here there are cisterns, residential quarters, and embrasured loopholes for archers. Most of the exterior masonry is the typical Armenian rusticated ashlar with finely drafted margins.

== Composition ==
There are 48 neighbourhoods in Feke District:

- Akkaya
- Akoluk
- Bağdatlı
- Bahçecik
- Belenköy
- Çandırlar
- Çondu
- Çürükler
- Değirmenciuşağı
- Gaffaruşağı
- Gedikli
- Göbelli
- Gökçeli
- Gürümze
- Güzpınarı
- Hıdıruşağı
- İncirci
- İslam
- Kaleyüzü
- Karacaoğlan
- Karacauşağı
- Kaşaltı
- Kayadibi
- Kazancı
- Keklikçe
- Kırıkuşağı
- Kısacıklı
- Kızılyer
- Koçyazı
- Konakkuran
- Kovukçınar
- Mansurlu
- Musalar
- Olucak
- Ormancık
- Ortaköy
- Oruçlu
- Paşalı
- Şahmuratlı
- Sülemişli
- Süphandere
- Tenkerli
- Tokmanaklı
- Tortulu
- Uğurlubağ
- Yaylapınar
- Yerebakan
- Yeşildüşmüş
