= Karakaya, İscehisar =

Karakaya
- Village
- Location within Turkey Location within Turkey Aegean
- Coordinates: 38.8974°N 30.8088°E
- Country: Turkey
- Province: Afyonkarahisar
- District: İscehisar
- Population (2021): 779
- Time zone: UTC+3 (TRT)

Karakaya is a village in the İscehisar District, Afyonkarahisar Province, Turkey. Its population is 779 (2021).
