= Örtülü, Hocalar =

Örtülü
- Village
- Location within Turkey Location within Turkey Aegean
- Coordinates: 38.4664°N 29.8947°E
- Country: Turkey
- Province: Afyonkarahisar
- District: Hocalar
- Population (2021): 217
- Time zone: UTC+3 (TRT)

Örtülü is a village in the Hocalar District, Afyonkarahisar Province, Turkey. Its population is 217 (2021).
