= Örencik, Hocalar =

Örencik
- Village
- Location within Turkey Location within Turkey Aegean
- Coordinates: 38.4892°N 29.8972°E
- Country: Turkey
- Province: Afyonkarahisar
- District: Hocalar
- Population (2021): 149
- Time zone: UTC+3 (TRT)

Örencik is a village in the Hocalar District, Afyonkarahisar Province, Turkey. Its population is 149 (2021).
