= Avgancık, Hocalar =

Avgancık
- Village
- Location within Turkey Location within Turkey Aegean
- Coordinates: 38.4743°N 29.8618°E
- Country: Turkey
- Province: Afyonkarahisar
- District: Hocalar
- Population (2021): 274
- Time zone: UTC+3 (TRT)

Avgancık is a village in the Hocalar District, Afyonkarahisar Province, Turkey. Its population is 274 (2021).
