= İhsaniye, Hocalar =

İhsaniye
- Village
- Location within Turkey Location within Turkey Aegean
- Coordinates: 38°36′47″N 29°55′21″E
- Country: Turkey
- Province: Afyonkarahisar
- District: Hocalar
- Population (2021): 142
- Time zone: UTC+3 (TRT)

İhsaniye is a village in the Hocalar District, Afyonkarahisar Province, Turkey. Its population is 142 (2021).
