= Devlethan, Hocalar =

Devlethan
- Village
- Location within Turkey Location within Turkey Aegean
- Coordinates: 38.5570°N 29.9597°E
- Country: Turkey
- Province: Afyonkarahisar
- District: Hocalar
- Population (2021): 575
- Time zone: UTC+3 (TRT)

Devlethan is a village in the Hocalar District, Afyonkarahisar Province, Turkey. Its population is 575 (2021).
