= Olukpınar, İscehisar =

Olukpınar
- Village
- Location within Turkey Location within Turkey Aegean
- Coordinates: 38.9528°N 30.7361°E
- Country: Turkey
- Province: Afyonkarahisar
- District: İscehisar
- Population (2021): 835
- Time zone: UTC+3 (TRT)

Olukpınar is a village in the İscehisar District, Afyonkarahisar Province, Turkey. Its population is 835 (2021).
