= Güre, Hocalar =

Güre
- Village
- Location within Turkey Location within Turkey Aegean
- Coordinates: 38.4722°N 29.9313°E
- Country: Turkey
- Province: Afyonkarahisar
- District: Hocalar
- Population (2021): 374
- Time zone: UTC+3 (TRT)

Güre is a village in the Hocalar District, Afyonkarahisar Province, Turkey. Its population is 374 (2021).
