= Çatağıl, İscehisar =

Çatağıl
- Village
- Location within Turkey Location within Turkey Aegean
- Coordinates: 38.9867°N 30.7991°E
- Country: Turkey
- Province: Afyonkarahisar
- District: İscehisar
- Population (2021): 481
- Time zone: UTC+3 (TRT)

Çatağıl is a village in the İscehisar District, Afyonkarahisar Province, Turkey. Its population is 481 (2021).
