= Bahçecik, İscehisar =

Bahçecik
- Village
- Location within Turkey Location within Turkey Aegean
- Coordinates: 38.8108°N 30.8267°E
- Country: Turkey
- Province: Afyonkarahisar
- District: İscehisar
- Population (2021): 71
- Time zone: UTC+3 (TRT)

Bahçecik is a village in the İscehisar District, Afyonkarahisar Province, Turkey. Its population is 71 (2021).
