= Pavonazzo marble =

Whitish marble from Docimium, Turkey

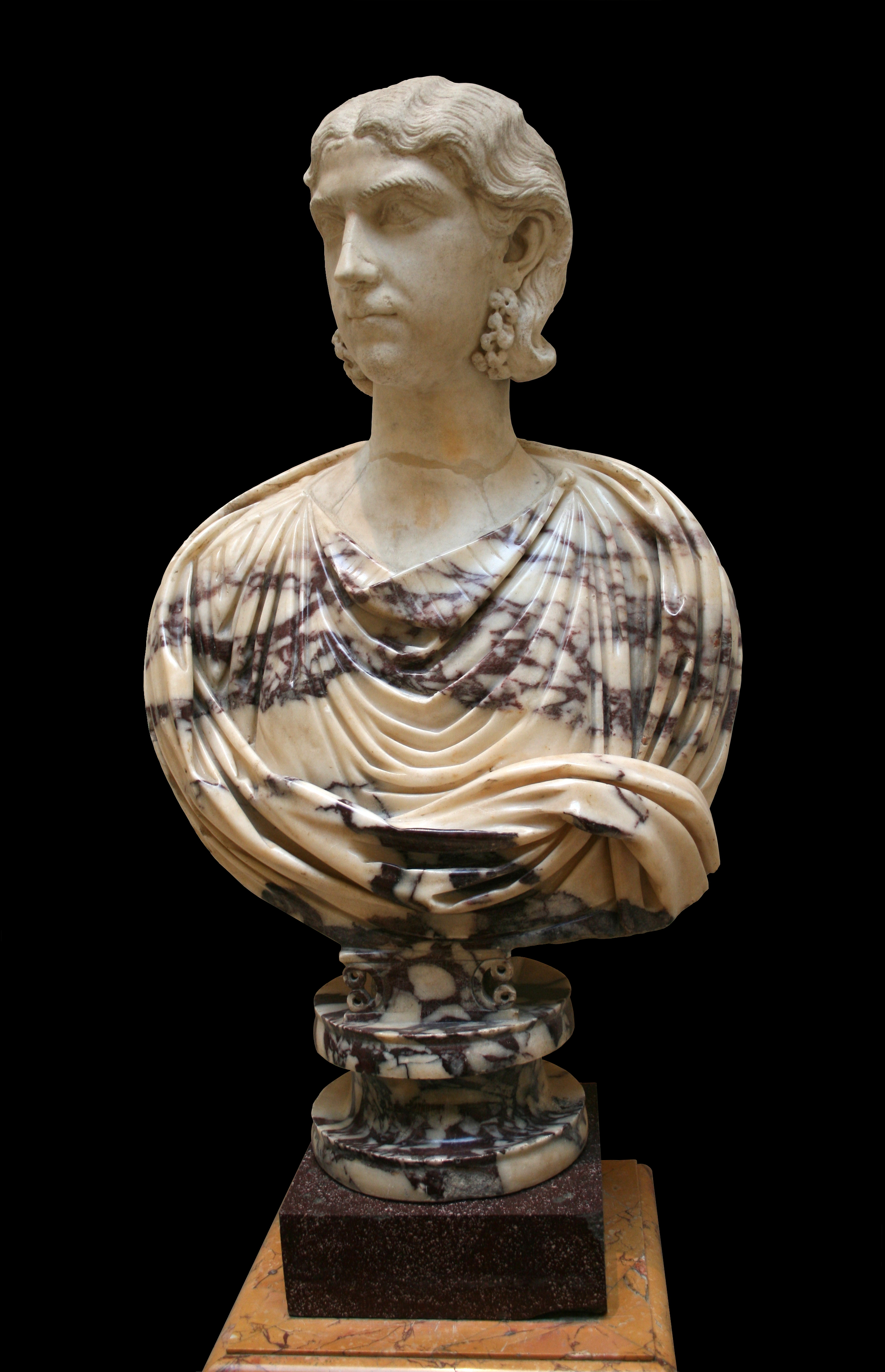
Portrait of woman in Pavonazzo marble, Roman artwork – Capitoline Museums in Rome.

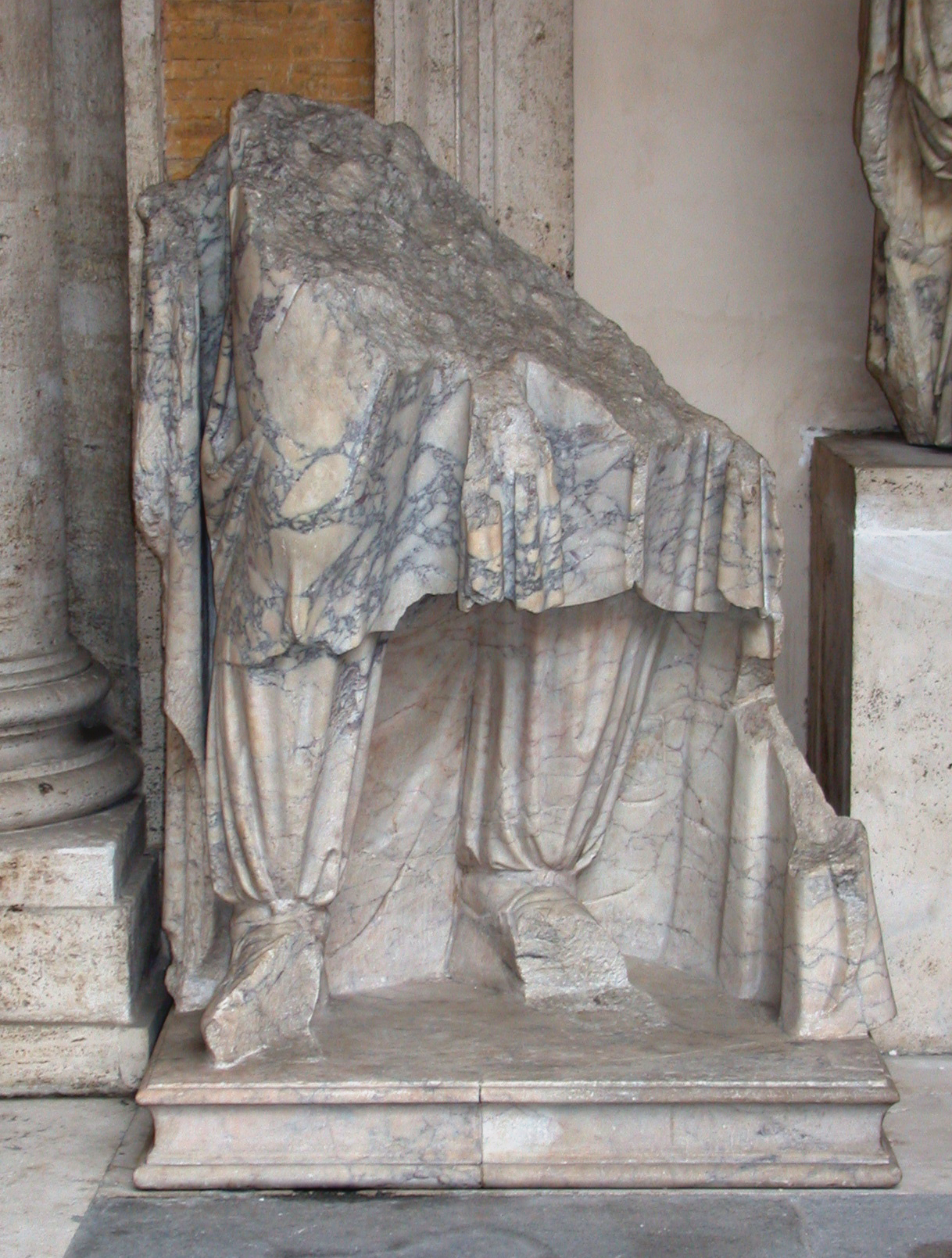
Statue in "pavonazzetto" (Docimaean) marble (lower part) in the court of the Conservatori Palace in the Capitoline Museums. This sculpture was on the Arch of Constantine; it was removed in the 18th century because of damage and replaced by a copy in white marble. Previously, it was in the Forum of Trajan.

Pavonazzo marble, also known as Pavonazzetto, Docimaean marble or Synnadic marble, is a whitish marble originally from Docimium, or modern İscehisar, Turkey.

== Etymology ==
The name derives from the Italian word for peacock (pavone).

== History ==
=== Ancient world ===
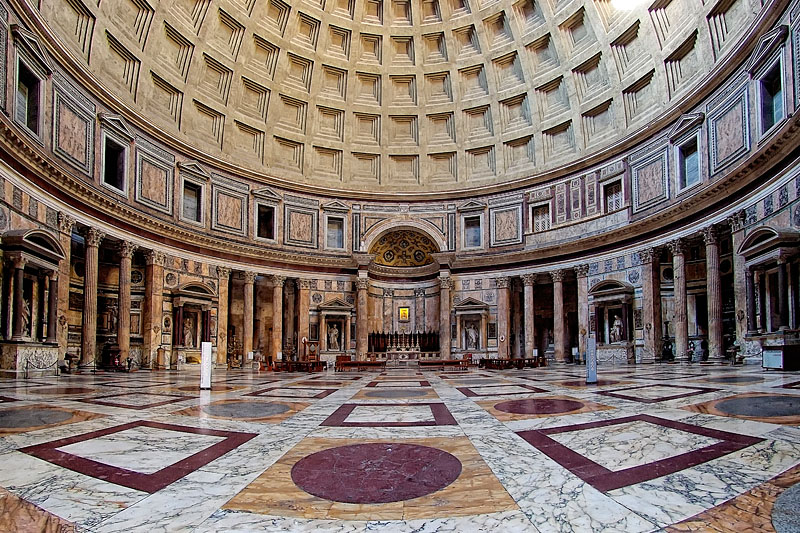
Pantheon, Rome. White Docimian marble is used on the floor and some of the columns such as the two protruding columns of the main apse. The white Docimian color on the floor is very dominant.

Pavonazzetto was not widely or extensively used before the Roman period; there is no evidence of it in circulation before the last two decades BC. The marble has been used in Rome since the Augustan age, when large-scale quarrying began at Docimium, and columns of it were used in the House of Augustus, as well as in the Temple of Mars Ultor, which also had pavonazzo floor tiles in the cella. Pavonazzetto statues of kneeling Phrygian barbarians existed in the Basilica Aemilia and Horti Sallustiani. Giant statue groups carved from Docimaean marble were discovered at Tiberius's Villa in Sperlonga.

Docimian Pavonazzetto was extensively used in major building projects both within Rome and the rest of the empire. Pavonazzetto was used on the most eye catching places such as, columns, wall and floor veneer and wall reliefs. Other marbles from all corners of the empire were used in combination; whenever Pavonazzetto was used as floor cover, it was usually in combination with other decorative marbles, however, the Pavonazzetto being a primarily white marble, it gave buildings a freshening white color.

Docimian marble was also preferred for sarcophagi sculpting, many emperors preferring this marble for its high value and majestic looks. As a result, some of the greatest masterpieces were made from this material, including the sarcophagi of Eudocia, Heraclius and many more.

=== Later Use ===
Docimaean Pavonazzo was later used for the Memoria Petri, the tomb of Saint Peter, in the influential Baroque Revival style historic buildings the Church of St. Ignatius Loyola, in New York City, and Belfast City Hall in Belfast, Northern Ireland.

== List of buildings with Pavonazzo marble ==
=== Buildings in Rome ===
- The Pantheon contains Docimian Pavonazzetto as floor pavement along with other marble types. The dominant white color is the Pavonazzetto, also some of the interior main columns and pilasters are made from Docimian marble.
- Forum of Augustus
- Forum of Trajan (floor and 184 column shafts)
- Temple of Mars Ultor (floor)
- Temple of Apollo Sosianus (floor)
- Basilica Aemilia (20 statues)
- Basilica Julia (floor and some columns)
- Basilica Ulpia (some of the columns)
- Basilica of San Paolo fuori le Mura (24 columns, destroyed by fire in 1823)
- The eight statues on the Arch of Constantine
- Baths of Caracalla (some of the columns and wall veneer)

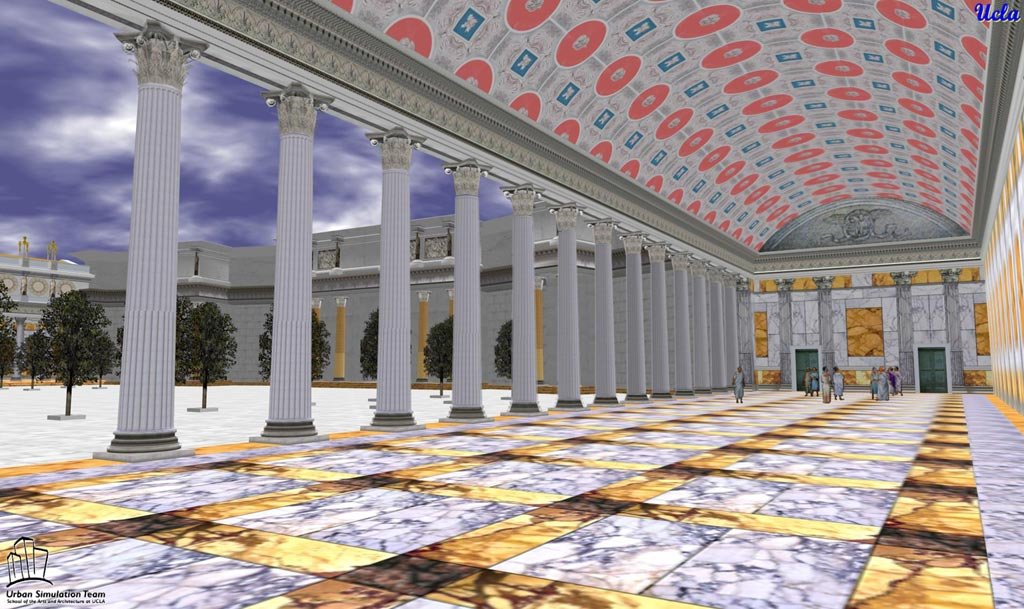
A computer-generated image of the Forum of Trajan in Rome. White Docimian marble is used in combination with yellow marble.

=== Buildings outside of Rome ===
- The Hagia Sophia has Docimian marble as veneer on the aisles and galleries.
- Saint Peter's Basilica, as veneer.
- Leptis Magna, former limestone columns were replaced with Pavonazzetto.
- Library of Celsus, the columns on the famous wall.
- Ancient City of Sagalassos, as wall and floor covering, 40 tons of veneer were recovered.
- Temple of Zeus and Hera in Greece, 100 columns and wall.

== See also ==
- List of types of marble
