= Topographic Relations of Philip II =

Statistical work containing information on demography of Spain

Topographic Relations of the towns from Spain, made under the command of Philip II (Spanish: Relaciones topográficas de los pueblos de España, hechas de orden de Felipe II) is the name by which is commonly known a statistical work supported and encouraged by Philip II of Spain. The data has been translated from Old Spanish to modern Spanish, published in 2022 and made available for researchers.

The result was a broad survey of aspects of the ecology of Spain as of the 1570s. The original aim of the project was to offer a detailed description of all the settlements of the kingdoms under his command. By royal order, an extensive questionnaire was sent out, but only a limited number of settlements were actually described in the completed work.
