= İscehisar District =

- District
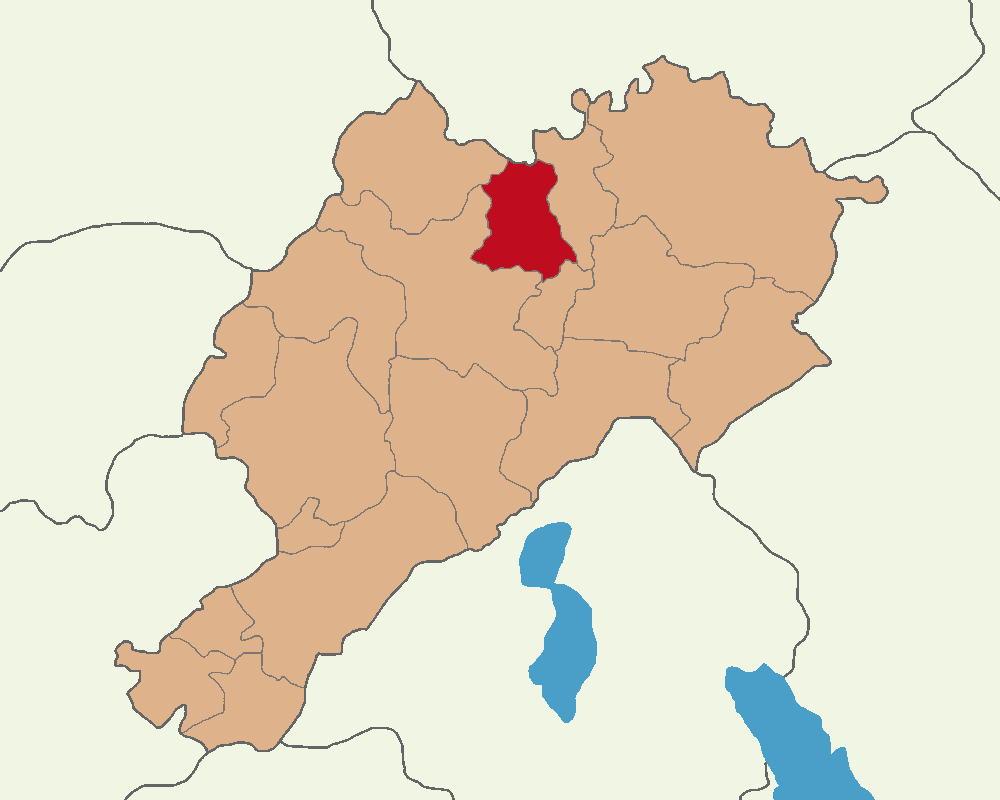
- Map showing İscehisar District in Afyonkarahisar Province

- Location in Turkey İscehisar District (Turkey Aegean)
- Coordinates: 38°52′N 30°45′E
- Country: Turkey
- Province: Afyonkarahisar
- Seat: İscehisar
- Area: 489 km^{2} (189 sq mi)
- Population (2021): 24,999
  - Density: 51.1/km^{2} (132/sq mi)
- Time zone: UTC+3 (TRT)

İscehisar District is a district of Afyonkarahisar Province of Turkey. Its seat is the town İscehisar. Its area is 489 km^{2}, and its population is 24,999 (2021).

== Composition ==
There are two municipalities in İscehisar District:

- İscehisar
- Seydiler

There are 11 villages in İscehisar District:

- Alanyurt
- Bahçecik
- Çalışlar
- Çatağıl
- Cevizli
- Doğanlar
- Doğlat
- Karaağaç
- Karakaya
- Konarı
- Olukpınar

== Economy ==
The province of Afyonkarahisar is famed for the quality of its marble, most of which is quarried in the district of İscehisar.
