= Dioclea (Phrygia) =

Town of ancient Phrygia

Coordinates: 38°39′50″N 29°53′17″E

Dioclea (also Dioclia, Diocleia or Diokleia; Ancient Greek: Διοκλεία, romanized: Diokleía) was a town of ancient Phrygia, inhabited during Roman and Byzantine times.

== History ==
In ancient times it had a mint, under its king Elagabalus.

It was the see of a Christian bishop. Lequien, names only two known bishops of the town. Constantius (fl 431 – 451) and Evander Another bishop, Gregorios, is attested in the first half of the 11th century. Diokleia was included in diocese lists until the 12th century. No longer the seat of a residential bishop, it remains a titular see of the Roman Catholic Church as well as the Eastern Orthodox Church (for which it is now a metropolitan titular see, with Kallistos Ware as its metropolitan until his death in August 2022).

Its site is located near Yeşilhisar in Asiatic Turkey. This site is located on the southwest flank of the Ahır Dağ, 84 km south of Kütahya. The only remains of the ancient settlement are a few old inscriptions and a capital dated to the early Byzantine period. The old name "Diokleia" is preserved in the nearby place called Dolay, or Doğla, a short distance to the south.
