= İscehisar =

- Municipality
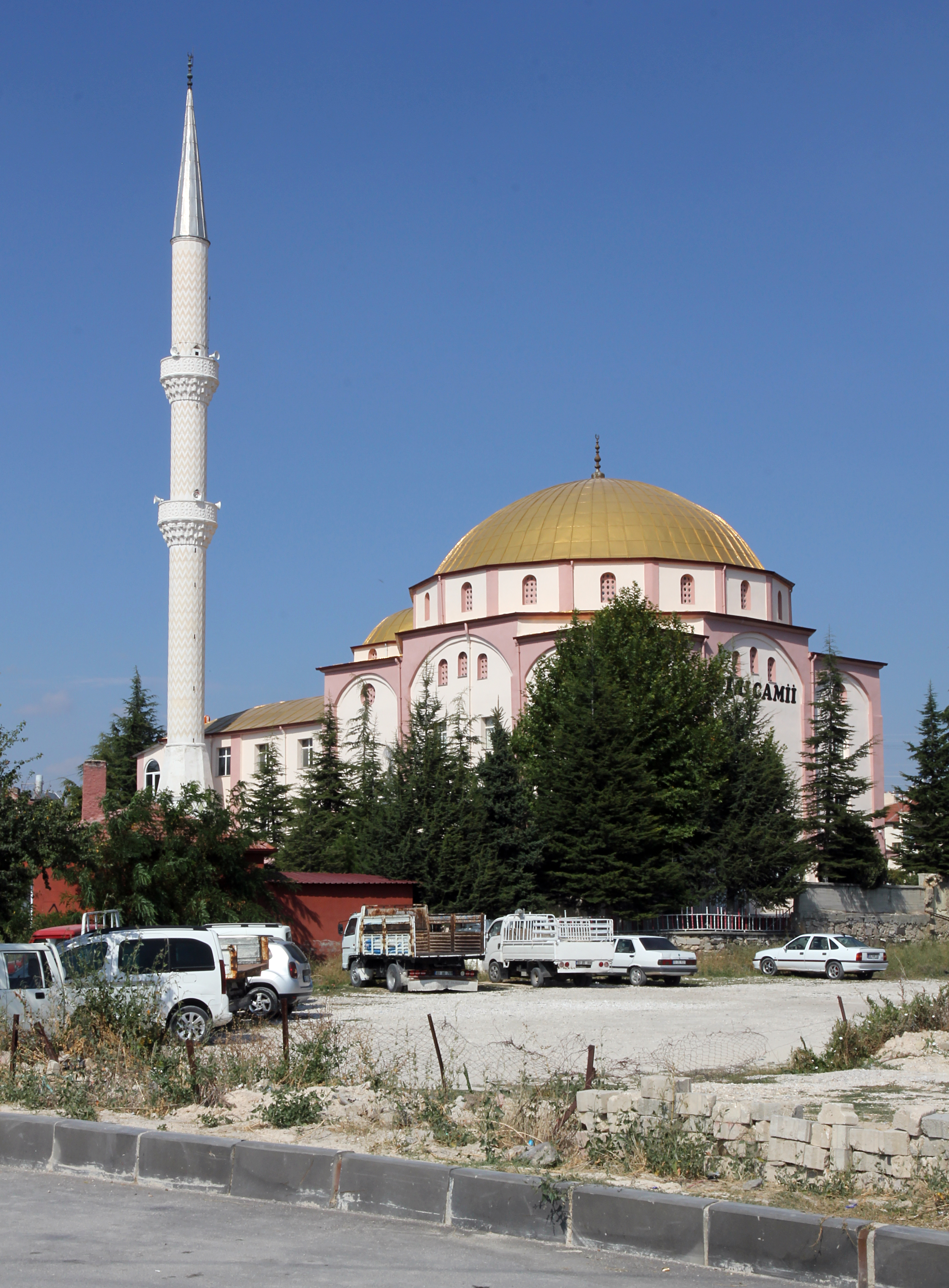

- Location within Turkey Location within Turkey Aegean
- Coordinates: 38°52′N 30°45′E
- Country: Turkey
- Province: Afyonkarahisar
- District: İscehisar

Government
  - Mayor: Seyhan Kılınçarslan (AKP)
- Population (2024): 25,084
- Time zone: UTC+3 (TRT)
- Climate: Csb
- Website: www.iscehisar.bel.tr

İscehisar is a town of Afyonkarahisar Province in the Aegean region of Turkey, on the road between the city of Afyon and Ankara. It is the seat of İscehisar District. İscehisar district has a total population of 25,084 according to the 2024 census. The mayor is Seyhan Kılınçarslan (AKP).

İscehisar has been identified as the ancient town of Docimium where the famous Docimaean marble was quarried which was used throughout the Roman Empire.
