= Kocagöl, Hocalar =

Kocagöl
- Village
- Location within Turkey Location within Turkey Aegean
- Coordinates: 38.5086°N 29.8903°E
- Country: Turkey
- Province: Afyonkarahisar
- District: Hocalar
- Population (2021): 241
- Time zone: UTC+3 (TRT)

Kocagöl is a village in the Hocalar District, Afyonkarahisar Province, Turkey. Its population is 241 (2021).
