= Varsak (tribe) =

Turkmen tribe from Turkey

Regions with significant populations
- Turkey: Adana, Aksaray, Antalya, Aydın, Kayseri, Kırşehir, Mersin, Osmaniye

Varsak is a Turkmen tribe mainly inhabiting Turkey. They were originally a tribe divided among the Karamanids and the Ramadanids. The Ottoman state struggled to bring the tribe under their authority as the main region they inhabited (known as Varsak ili) was situated high in the Bolkar Mountains, constituting the rugged border between the region of Karaman and Cilicia.

== History ==
Varsak was listed among the Turkmen tribes who established themselves in southern Anatolia by 14th-century sources from the Mamluk Sultanate, such as Ṣubḥ al-aʿshā of al-Qalqashandi and Zubdat Kashf al-Mamalik of Ibn Shahin al-Zahiri. The Varsaks were among the most powerful Turkmen tribes who joined the Karamanid princes Pir Ahmed and Kasim in their struggle against the Ottoman state. With tribal support, Pir Ahmed and Kasim took over various Anatolian towns including Aksaray, Develi, Ereğli, Larende, and Niğde, although they failed to capture Konya. Kasim took advantage of the Ottomans' investment in Euboia on the European side of the Aegean Sea and advanced as north as Ankara. Mehmed II (r. 1444–46, 1451–81) assigned Rum Mehmed Pasha to subdue the Karamanids in the summer of 1470. Chief of the Varsaks, Uyuz Beg, and his men flanked Rum Mehmed Pasha in the Taurus Mountains, disrupting the Ottoman hopes to extinguish the Karamanids. Later, Ishak Pasha was also tasked with dealing with the Karamanids. Ishak Pasha successfully defeated the Turghud and Varsak Turkmens. He captured the rebellious fortresses of Varkoy, Uçhisar, and Ortahisar, exiled the residents of Aksaray to Constantinople, and repaired the fortifications of Mut and Niğde.

== Sub-tribes ==
The major sub-tribes of Varsak are Kushtamur, Esenlu, Gokchalu, Elvanlu, Kusun, and Ulash. Other sources also include the tribe of Kara Isa as part of the Varsaks.

== Bibliography ==
- Gökbel, Ahmet (2007). Anadolu'da Varsak Türkmenleri [Varsak Turkmens in Anatolia] (in Turkish). Ankara: Ataturk Cultural Center Press. ISBN 9789751619723. OCLC 850668720. Archived from the original on 15 May 2024.
- Har-El, Shai (1995). Struggle for Domination in the Middle East: The Ottoman-Mamluk War, 1485-91. E.J. Brill. ISBN 9004101802. OCLC 624096003.
